= Pixel Privateers =

2017 video game

- Developer: Quadro Delta
- Publisher: Re-Logic
- Platform: Microsoft Windows
- Release: February 21, 2017
- Genre: Tactical role-playing game
- Modes: Single-player, multiplayer

Pixel Privateers is a 2017 tactical role-playing game developed by Quadro Delta and published by Re-Logic. In the game, the player travels with a squad through outer space with the goal to collect loot, complete missions, and defeat various enemies on different planets. Upon exploration, the player can upgrade their spaceship, items, and stats of squad members. The game also features a multiplayer mode, with up to four people. The game borrowed elements from Quadro Delta's Pixel Piracy and Re-Logic's Terraria. The game received criticism for its monotonous missions, item management system, and controls, but was praised for its game art.

== Gameplay ==
A screenshot from the game, displaying a group of players defeating enemies on a green planet

Pixel Privateers is a roguelike and tactical role-playing game in which the player travels through outer space with a group of adventurers to collect loot and fulfill quests on numerous planets. The game features a character class system, with classes such as ranged, melee, and engineer, which determines what weapons the player can use throughout the game. While exploring the planets, the player discovers buildings and encounters cyborg aliens, humans, and tougher versions of enemies known as bosses. The player can alter the difficulty of each planet, as well as enable the "iron man mode" player difficulty, which enables permadeath for squad members. The player can either choose to control the entire squad at once or command each individual member. Upon exploration, the player can level up and customize their ship. The player can also customize their squad members with armor and other upgrades, all of which boost the team's defensive and offensive stats, and increase the size of the squad up to eight members. Additionally, the player can clone resources and members of the squad. The art style includes retro and sci-fi elements. The game features a tutorial at the beginning of the game. It has two multiplayer modes, the battle mode and the co-op mode for up to four players.

== Development and release ==
Pixel Privateers was developed by the Finnish-Spanish independent developer team Quadro Delta and published by Re-Logic. Quadro Delta previously worked with Re-Logic on Pixel Piracy. The game borrowed elements from Re-Logic's Terraria and Quadro Delta's Pixel Piracy. The game was initially scheduled to be released in the first quarter of 2016, but was ultimately released on February 21, 2017, on Steam for the Windows platform.

== Reception ==
Reception

Review score
Publication	Score
Gamereactor	6/10

Reviewers have criticized the game's missions for being monotonous or lacking diversity. Alec Meers of Rock Paper Shotgun also noted that "mission structures can be tiresome too", due to having a looping structure for collecting loot and leveling up. Kotaku's Nathan Grayson has, however, lauded the game's variety of enemy factions and story. Meers disliked the combat system since it was "mostly a matter of frantic right-clicking", while Softonic similarly criticized the game's controls, stating that it "[takes] some learning". Its style of gameplay has been compared to Borderlands and Diablo.

The item management system has also been criticized; Softonic and Kotaku noted that the game offers "too much loot". Meers and Softonic praised the looks of the game art, particularly noting that the environments are more detailed than the characters. A. R. Teschner of Gamereactor called the music "pleasant".
