= Scott Arpajian =

American technology executive (b.1970)

Scott Loewen Arpajian is an American technology executive, entrepreneur and author, best known for being a co-founder of the software download website Download.com. He was the former CEO of Softonic.

== Career ==
In 1993, Arpajian got his first job in tech as associate editor for ZDNet, an online service published by Ziff Davis, where he remained until 1996.

=== CNET Networks and Download.com ===
In April 1996, Arpajian joined CNET Networks as Executive Producer, Software Services. In his first few weeks on the job, he had the idea of taking one of the domains owned by CNET, Download.com, and using it to launch a software download website. Download.com launched in October, 1996 and gained significant popularity. It was the recipient of the People's Voice Webby Award for IT/Hardware in 2005 and won the judges award for the same category in 2007.

=== Rocket, Paper, Scissors and Dizzywood ===
In 2006 Arpajian became an entrepreneur, co-founding startup Rocket Paper Scissors in Tiburon, California, alongside Sean Kelly and Ken Marden. Rocket Paper Scissors launched its first project, the massively multiplayer game Dizzywood in November, 2007. Dizzywood was an online world for kids where they could play free games, explore unique and imaginative areas and meet new friends in a safe environment.

Popular among children ages 8 to 12, Dizzywood's online community grew rapidly, reaching over 400,000 monthly global visitors and was covered in multiple press outlets, among them The New York Times. Over three years, Dizzywood's collaborative world amassed over 1.5 million users.

In 2010, Dizzywood was consolidated when San Mateo, California-based SecretBuilders bought Dizzywood's assets.

The game world closed down 2010, but the website, with most of the content, remains online.

=== The Walt Disney Company ===
In June 2012, Arpajian became vice president, Strategy and International of Disney Social Games, part of Disney Interactive, where he led business development, international operations and franchise strategy until July 2014.

=== Softonic ===
In February 2015, leading software download website Softonic announced that it had appointed Arpajian to the role of CEO, making him the first American senior executive for the Spanish company.

Immediately upon joining the company, Arpajian made the crucial decision to discontinue the company's controversial Softonic Downloader product in order to regain user trust. Arpajian later launched Clean and Safe, an initiative to clean up the website's software catalog and ensure users a safe and secure user experience.

Under Arpajian's leadership, Softonic was able to return to profitability in just 7 months.

== Writing ==
Arpajian is the author of three books about technology: How to Use HTML3; How to Use HTML 3.2 (with Robert Mullen) and How to Use the World Wide Web (with Wayne Ause).
