= Ghacks =

Technology blog

- Company type: Subsidiary
- Website type: blog
- Founded: October 2005
- Headquarters: Essen, {{{location_country}}}
- Owner: Unknown
- Founder: Martin Brinkmann
- Key people: Martin Brinkmann, former Editor-in-chief
- Services: Reviews / Recommendations
- Employees: 5
- Website: www.ghacks.net

Ghacks Technology News is a technology blog created by Martin Brinkmann in October 2005. Its primary focus is on web browser and Windows tips, software, guides and reviews.

== Coverage ==
The editor-in-chief and founder is Martin Brinkmann. All authors that contribute articles for the site are listed in the footer area on the website.

An average of five posts are published each day of the week with topics ranging from Windows and Linux operating system news to web browser tips (focusing on Firefox, Google Chrome and Opera, online services like Gmail and Outlook.com, and general tech news and tips.

Popular posts include login related troubleshooting guides like Gmail or Facebook.

Ghacks Technology News articles have been republished by sites such as Lifehacker, Gizmodo, DonationCoder.com, and other sites due to its coverage of cyber security, troubleshooting and FOSS.

== History ==
Ghacks was created in 2005 as a development blog for a software called Google Hacks. Trademark issues made the founder of the site pick ghacks as the domain name. The software was soon thereafter discontinued and Ghacks turned from a development type blog to a software and online news oriented blog.

In April 5, 2008, Grand Effect blog advertising network, co-founded by Sarah Perez and David Peralty, included eXtra for Every Publisher, gHacks, ParisLemon, SheGeeks, Sarah in Tampa, and The Last Podcast!.

From 2008 to 2011, the site held an annual Christmas Giveaway, with commercial software given away to readers.

The website received more than 400,000 visitors per day as of January 2017, and as of June 2019 has an Alexa traffic rank of 9,537 worldwide and 4,269 in the United States.

In October 2019, Ghacks was acquired by Softonic.

In December 2025, Ghacks was acquired from Softonic by a third party. Neither Brinkmann nor co-writer Ashwin Karthik remained at the site following the ownership change.

== Reception ==
Ghacks Technology News has received recommendations by DL.TV, Diggnation, and KNLS Radio's Eye on the Web with Mary Westheimer.

Technorati listed Ghacks as a top 100 blog in both the general technology and info technology category; in September 2013, it occupied position 21 in the Info technology category and 68 in the overall technology category on Technorati.
