= Pixel Piracy =

2014 video game with Roguelike Elements

- Developer: Quadro Delta (Note: Ported to PlayStation 4 and Xbox One by Abstraction Games)
- Publisher: Re-Logic (Note: Published to PlayStation 4 and Xbox One by 505 Games)
- Producer: Alexander Poysky
- Composer: Kole Hiks
- Engine: Unity
- Platforms: Microsoft Windows; OS X; Linux; PlayStation 4; Xbox One
- Release: Windows, OS X, Linux; July 31, 2014; PlayStation 4, Xbox One; February 16, 2016
- Genre: Action-adventure
- Mode: Single-player

Pixel Piracy is a 2014 side-scrolling action-adventure game with roguelike elements, developed by indie game studio Quadro Delta and published by Re-Logic. In the game, players construct a pirate ship, hire and train a crew, and guide their crew toward notoriety by defeating the four pirate captains in a procedurally-generated world full of islands. The player can select destinations on the map, participate in ship battles, defeat foes, collect valuables, and improve their crew with various abilities.

The developers began working on the game in 2013. It went through several development stages, including being released in early access. The game was fully released on Steam on July 31, 2014, and later on PlayStation 4 and Xbox One. It received one major update before development stopped in 2016. After resuming development in 2023, downloadable content was published and an online version of the game was announced. The game received mixed reviews, with praise going to its sandbox elements, graphics, and soundtrack, specifically due to the addition of sea shanties in the game. However, reviewers criticized the mechanics, user interface, and described the gameplay as repetitive.

== Gameplay ==
Pixel Piracy takes place on procedurally-generated islands.

Pixel Piracy is an open world and side-scrolling action-adventure game that uses 16-bit-styled sprites and 2D graphics. The single-player game combines elements of role-playing, particularly the roguelike subgenre, platformer, simulation, and strategy genres. The goal of the game is to defeat four notorious pirate captains, but players are allowed to explore the game's world. The game includes a tutorial that teaches players the game's core mechanics.

After customizing the player character and difficulty settings of the procedurally-generated world, the player takes control of a pirate captain who spawns on an island, where players are given a set of blocks to build their own ship and coins to hire a crew. The pirate captain has nearly complete control over the size of the ship and crew and can upgrade their ship with cannons. The captain can also die by starvation, enemy pirates, or wild animals; the game also has permadeath, which means that the captain does not respawn after death.

Gameplay consists of sailing the ship between islands, fighting foes, and interacting with the inhabitants of islands. While traveling, the player must manage the crew's hunger and deal with equipment requirements. The game has a day-night cycle. To embark, the player can select a destination on the world map. Locations range in population and danger. The game controls the actual sailing, but the ship will stop for a battle if its route crosses an occupied map node. Ship battles are determined by acquired stats, such as health, morale, and supply level, and by choices the player can make. Winning battles earns the player points and equipment, which they can use to improve the crew's size and abilities, such as swimming, cleaning, cooking, and fishing. In addition, once foes are defeated, the player can choose to take over or destroy their ships. Upon reaching a destination, the inhabitants may be friendly or hostile toward the crew; the islands can also contain animals, valuables, and taverns that can be adopted as the crew's headquarters. The crew can also catch wild animals in cages and domesticate them as part of the crew. Other types of encounters include towns with four different types of stores. The game features "squirrel-ish" voice acting between the pirates and shop owners.

Crew stats affect the success of pillaging at a destination. Taverns provide an infinite supply of food and beverages, like ale, to aid the crew in healing their wounds, as well as armed pirates for crew expansion. The captain can use books, either found or purchased, to teach the crew new abilities. Additionally, crew members may defecate aboard the ship. Pirates can equip melee, ranged, or rock weaponry.

The game has been updated over time, introducing a variety of difficulty modes. In addition to the standard gameplay, Pixel Piracy previously offered an "arena mode" in which the pirate captain would defend an island that was being invaded by a wave of pirates who progressively increased in difficulty and speed.

== Development and release ==
Pixel Piracy was developed by Finnish and Spanish independent developers Vitali Kirpu and Alexander Poysky, collectively known as Quadro Delta, and published by Re-Logic. The game was developed using the Unity game engine. Poysky said that Re-Logic and their 2011 indie sandbox game Terraria inspired him to pursue a career in video game development. Re-Logic actively contributed to the development of Pixel Piracy, assisting with quality assurance and design. Kirpu initially worked entirely alone on the game, but Mikko Arvala later joined as a maintenance developer. Poysky worked as a producer on the game; Pixel Piracy also had its own testing team.

Development of the game began in mid-2013. The alpha version was released in November 2013, and it was accepted through the Steam Greenlight system. The game was launched in early access on Steam in December 2013, and its developers also released a free torrent of the game "in an attempt to compromise with users who will pirate the game regardless". Poysky said that the early access system on Steam allowed the team to grow in momentum and fund the game. Pixel Piracy remained in early access until it was fully released on Steam on July 31, 2014, for Microsoft Windows, OS X, and Linux. The game features a custom soundtrack composed by Kole Hiks, including sea shanties inspired by Assassin's Creed IV: Black Flag. Pixel Piracy has references to the Monkey Island video game series and the Pirates of the Caribbean film series.

Following its full release, Quadro Delta released the Enhanced Edition for free to all Pixel Piracy owners on April 23, 2015. Poysky said that the team "felt it wasn't up to snuff with our standards" when the game was first launched. The developers issued a formal apology, acknowledging their failures and assuring players that much work had been and would continue to be done to meet all development promises and fix all the game's issues. The Enhanced Edition supported more languages and improved items, abilities, and artificial intelligence (AI). Abstraction Games and 505 Games published the games for PlayStation 4 and Xbox One, where it was later released on February 16, 2016. The game was available on PlayStation Plus until May 2023. Simultaneously with the console release, Pixel Piracy received crossover content from Terraria.

After February 2016, Pixel Piracy entered a seven-year development hiatus. Quadro Delta went bankrupt in late 2017, after which the duo split up. Development resumed with the next patch in January 2023. Since then, the game has received regular updates. The game's first piece of downloadable content, Pixel Piracy – Shrimp Legacy, was released a month later.

== Reception ==
Reception

Aggregate score
| Aggregator | Score |
|---|---|
| Metacritic | (PS4) 50/100 (Xbox One) 53/100 |

Review scores
| Publication | Score |
|---|---|
| Eurogamer | 5/10 |
| Gamekult | 5/10 |
| IGN | 6.8/10 |
| The Games Machine (Italy) | 6.8/10 |
| Pure Xbox | 5/10 |
| Svet kompjutera | 70/100 |

Pixel Piracy received "mixed or average" reviews according to review aggregator Metacritic. Initially, during its early access phase, reviewers complimented the game for its potential. Craig Pearson of PC Gamer described it as a "fine example of a cute Early Access title". Jose Rodríguez of IGN praised the overall game, saying that it has innovative and enjoyable elements. The game received the Indie DB Indie of the Year award in the Editors Choice category.

Reviewers criticised the gameplay and its mechanics, describing the controls as complicated, and the combat system as perplexing. Writing for Gamekult, Thomas Mangot mentioned that it had bugs upon full release and that the game's artificial intelligence was "chaotic". Pearson characterized the map as vague and said that combat could have been improved. Josephine Lawton of Pure Xbox stated that the ability to control both the pirate captain and the crew "often doesn't work as expected", explaining that the crew often refused to jump on the enemy ship or walk, and that even after the enemy ship was defeated, the crew would not move. Upon its full release in 2014, the game lacked tutorials that explained its mechanisms. Lawton observed that upon its addition, the tutorial did not introduce the player to the majority of the game's elements. The game was nonetheless lauded for its sandbox elements. The game's concepts of building were compared to Sid Meier's Pirates!. The game also garnered criticism for its repetitive gameplay mechanisms. (Note: Attributed to following reviews:) Scott Craft of Player.One said that the gameplay was initially entertaining but that the game quickly became dull.

The game was criticised for its graphics and textures. (Note: Attributed to following reviews:) Pearson observed that its graphics and soundtrack contrasted with the difficulty of the gameplay, whilst Craft said that "Pixel Piracy's rather vibrant aesthetic lends itself well to the subject". Lawton, on the other hand, disliked that the sprites did not integrate with the backgrounds that she saw as dry, while Roberto Turrini of The Games Machine found the pixel graphics confusing at times. Emmanuel González of IGN described the design of the islands as "repetitive" but graphically pleasant. According to Rodríguez, the PC version is more detailed than the Xbox One version. The user interface was criticized as confusing. Furthermore, reviewers of the console versions of the game criticized the interface's point-and-click nature as unfriendly.

Reviewers praised the game's soundtrack, especially the use of sea shanties. (Note: Attributed to following reviews:) González said that the game's "sound effects are simple but effective", while Lawton, however, claimed that the overall soundtrack is repetitious and annoying. The voice acting also gained acclaim by Player.One. Ramón Varela of Vandal likened the game's voice acting to the Worms video game series.

== Legacy ==
Quadro Delta also worked with Re-Logic on a tactical role-playing game named Pixel Privateers, which was released in 2017. The game adopted elements of Pixel Piracy and Terraria while also featuring an online cooperative mode. It was compared to the Borderlands and Diablo games.

In September 2023, Kirpu announced that an online version of the game, Pixel Piracy Online, was in development. The game has an unknown release date.
