= Video games in the United States =

Video game industry in the United States

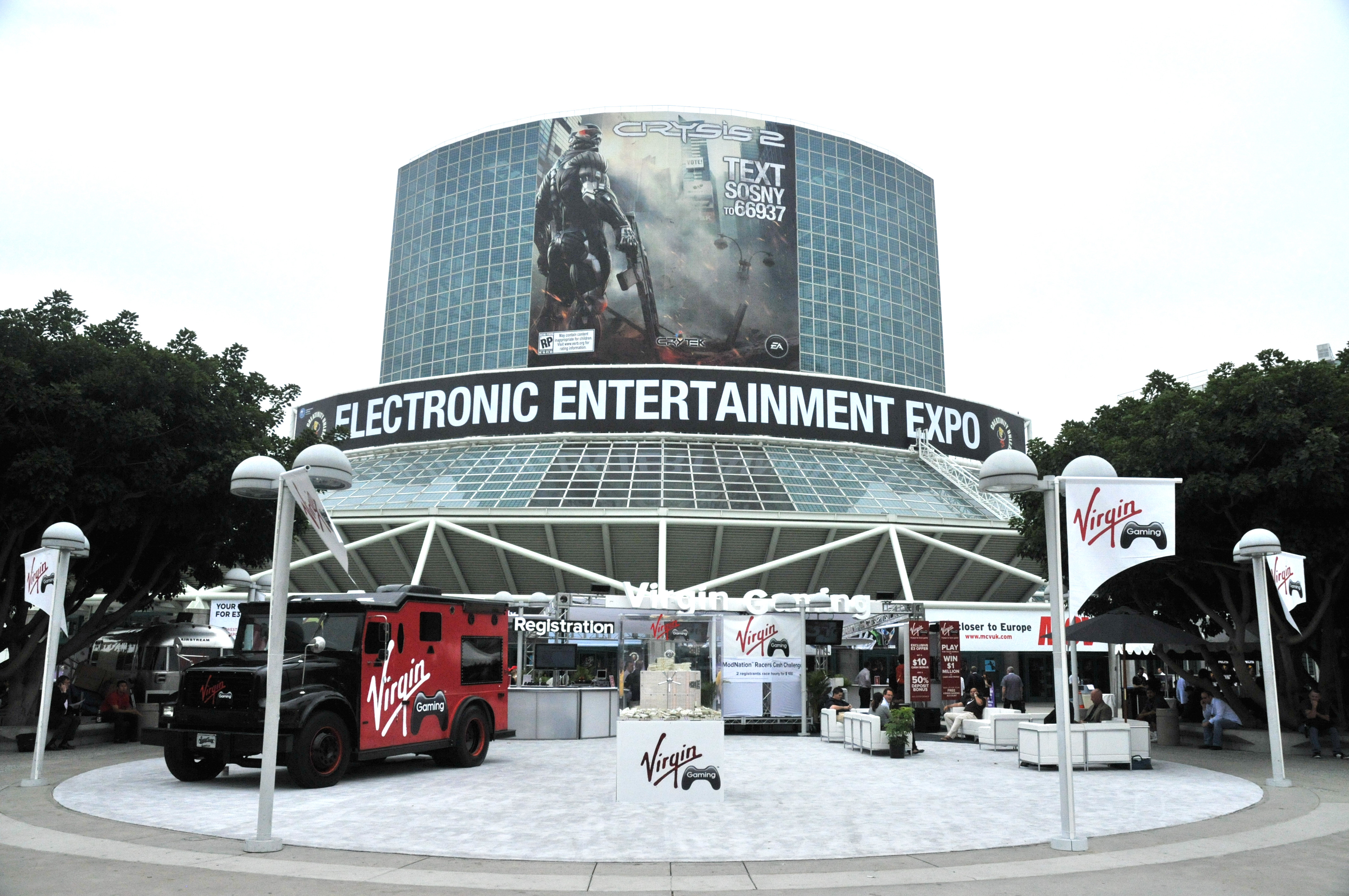
E3 2010 at the Los Angeles Convention Center

The video game industry in the United States is one of the fastest-growing entertainment industries in the country. The American video game industry is the largest video game industry in the world. According to a 2020 study released by the Entertainment Software Association (ESA), the yearly economic output of the American video game industry in 2019 was $90.3 billion, supporting over 429,000 American jobs. With an average yearly salary of about $121,000, the latter figure includes over 143,000 individuals who are directly employed by the video game business. Additionally, activities connected to the video game business generate $12.6 billion in federal, state, and local taxes each year. The World Economic Forum estimates that, by 2025, the American gaming industry will reach $42.3 billion while the worldwide gaming industry will possibly reach US$270 billion. The United States is one of the nations with the largest influence in the video game industry, with video games representing a significant part of its economy.

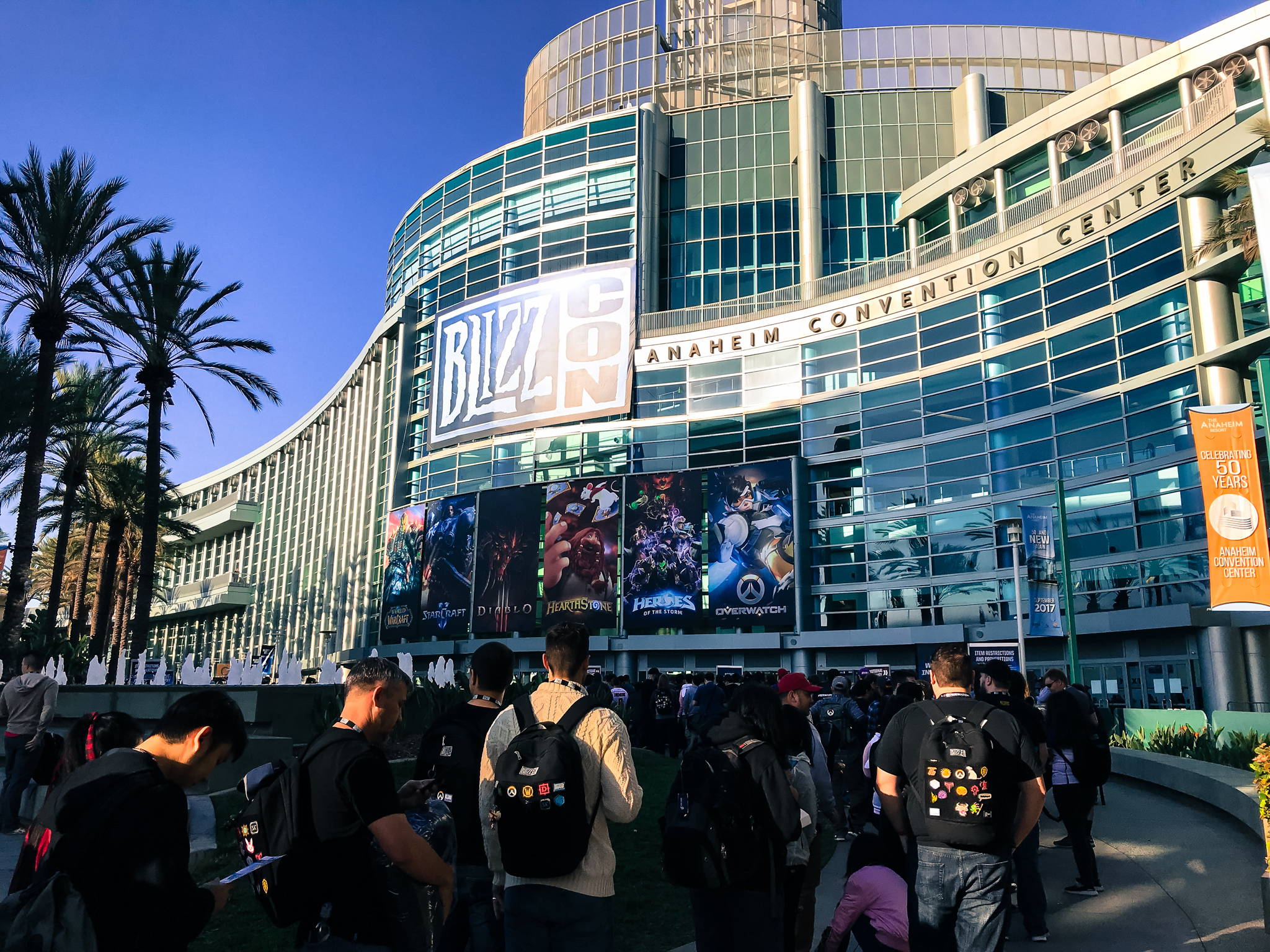
BlizzCon in 2017

Major publishers headquartered in the United States are: Sony Interactive Entertainment, Xbox (consist of Xbox Game Studios, Bethesda Softworks and Activision Blizzard), Electronic Arts, Take-Two Interactive, Epic Games, Valve, Warner Bros. Games, Riot Games, and others. Major video game events such as BlizzCon, QuakeCon, Summer Game Fest, and PAX are held every year in the US. For many years, E3, held annually in the US, was considered the biggest gaming expo of the year in terms of its importance and impact. The Game Awards, The New York Game Awards, and D.I.C.E. Awards are some of the most respected video game awards events in the video game industry. 103 million people watched The Game Awards 2022 event alone. The Game Developers Conference (GDC) is still the largest and one of the most important video game conferences for video game developers.

In statistics collected by the ESA for the year 2013, a reported 58% of Americans play video games and the average American household now owns at least one dedicated video game console, PC or smartphone. According to estimates from Nielsen Media Research, approximately 45.7 million U.S. households in 2006 (or approximately 40 percent of approximately 114.4 million) owned a dedicated home video game console, and by 2015, 51 percent of U.S. households owned a dedicated home video game console according to an Entertainment Software Association annual industry report. The households that own these items play games most commonly on their console or PC. 36% of U.S. gamers play on their smartphones. 43% of video game consumers believe games give them the most value for their money compared to other common forms of entertainment such as movies or music. In 2011, the average American gamer spent an average of 13 hours per week playing video games. In 2013, almost half of Americans who were gaming more than they did in 2010 spent less time playing board games, watching TV, going to the movies, and watching movies at home. When Americans game, 62% do so with others online or in person, yet the other person is more likely to be a friend than a significant other or family member. The most common reason parents play video games with their children is as a fun family activity, or because they are asked to. 52% of parents believe video games are a positive part of their child's life, and 71% of parents with children under 18 see gaming as beneficial to mental stimulation or education.

== Demographics ==
1. <18 (20.0%)
2. 18-34 (38.0%)
3. 35-44 (14.0%)
4. 45-54 (12.0%)
5. 55-64 (9.00%)
6. 65+ (7.00%)

The number of mobile game players in the US is higher than it has ever been at more than 191 million people, or 57.3% of the population.

The average age of a U.S. gamer is 35, the average number of years a U.S. gamer has been playing games is 13. In 2021, it was reported that the age distribution of U.S. gamers were 20% under the 18 years old, 38% were in between 18 and 34 years old, 14% were in between 35 and 44 years old, 12% were in between 45 and 54 years old, 9% were in between 55 and 64 years old, and 7% were 65 years old or over. The American gamer population is 54% male and 46% female. Of those females, women 18 and older account for a greater portion of the population than males younger than 18. The average female video game player is 44 years old, while the average male video game player is 35.

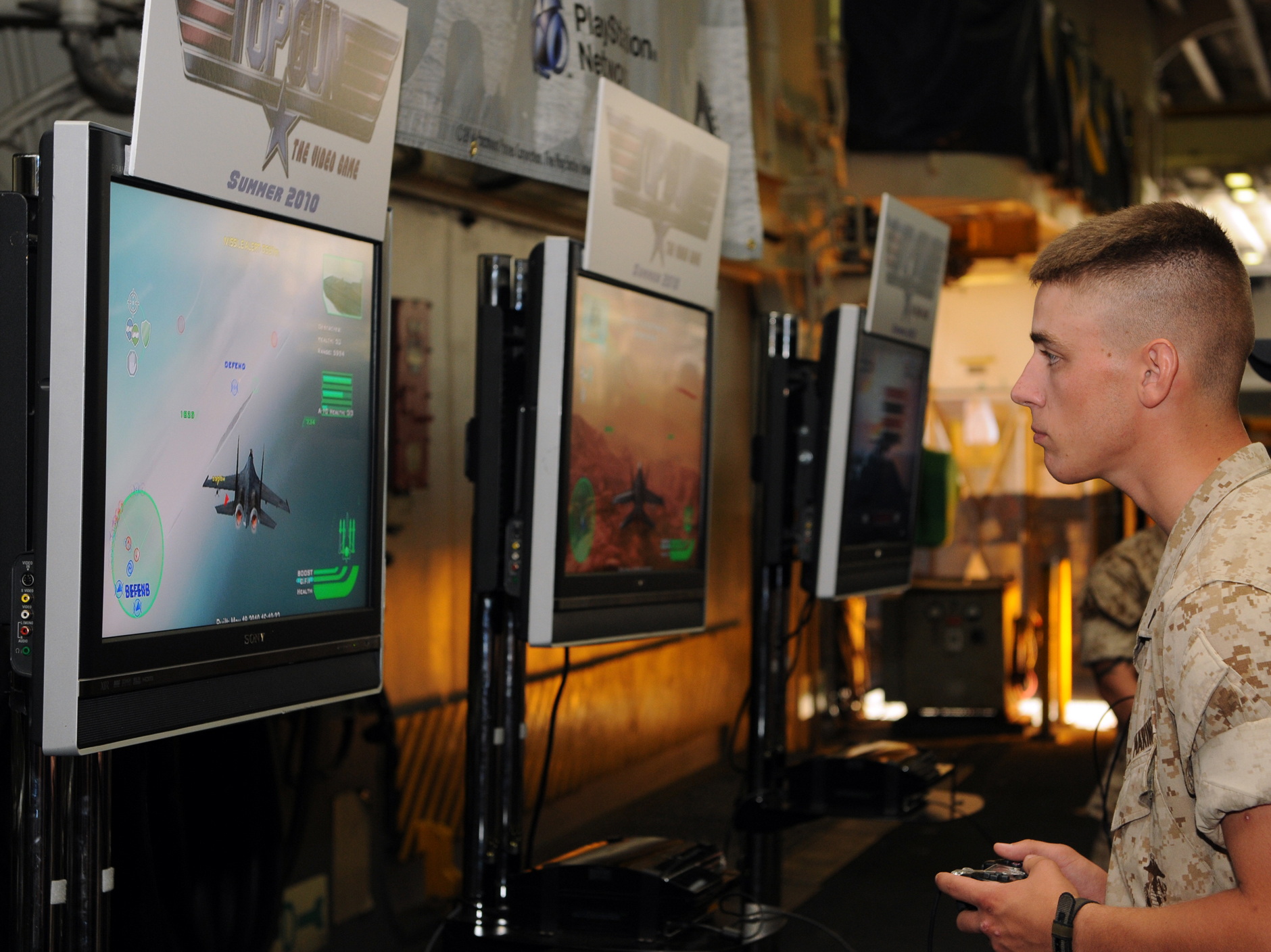
US Marine playing Top Gun in 2010

== Market statistics ==
The best-selling console video game genres of 2022 were action, shooters, and sports. The PC gaming market's best-selling genres were role-playing, strategy, and casual. For online games, the most popular genres are puzzle/trivia, action/strategy, and casual/social games. While there are many American video game developers that have been producing games for years, Japanese video games and companies have regularly been listed in the annual lists of best sellers. In December 2022, American consumers spent $7.6 billion on video gaming content, hardware, and accessories, up 2% from the previous month and bringing total expenditure for the year to $56.6 billion. The unit sales growth featured a similar drop with the report of 188 million units sold from 245.9 in 2021. U.S. gaming consumers spent a total of $20.77 billion on the game industry alone and currently hard copies of video games are still dominating in sales compared to digital copies. 2022 saw inexorable expansion in the gaming sector, particularly in online and mobile gaming. A fundamental shift in mentality is also occurring, with games now being viewed as venues for creativity, self-expression, and socialization. While major IT firms are developing their own meta-universes, new gaming technologies such as AR, VR, and MR are changing the industry.

=== Best-selling video games by year ===
The following titles are the top-selling video game titles in the United States annually since 1980, with sales figures from The NPD Group since 1994. Among the 41 reported annual top-sellers between 1980 and 2022, thirteen were published by Nintendo, twelve by Activision Blizzard, four each by Atari and Take-Two Interactive, three by Electronic Arts, and two each by Sega and Acclaim Entertainment.

| Year | Top-selling title | Developer | Publisher (Note: Only the parent company/publisher appears on the NPD/Circana list.) | Platform(s) | Ref |
|---|---|---|---|---|---|
| 1980 | Space Invaders | Taito | Atari | Atari VCS | |
| 1981 | Space Invaders | Taito | Atari | Atari VCS | |
| 1982 | Pac-Man | Namco, Atari | Atari | Atari VCS | |
| 1983 | Ms. Pac-Man | GCC, Midway | Atari | Atari VCS | |
| 1986 | Super Mario Bros. | Nintendo R&D4 | Nintendo | NES | |
| 1987 | The Legend of Zelda | Nintendo R&D4 | Nintendo | NES | |
| 1988 | Super Mario Bros./Duck Hunt | Nintendo | Nintendo | NES | |
| 1989 | Super Mario Bros./Duck Hunt | Nintendo | Nintendo | NES | |
| 1990 | Super Mario Bros. 3 | Nintendo R&D4 | Nintendo | NES | |
| 1991 | Sonic the Hedgehog | Sonic Team | Sega | Genesis | |
| 1992 | Sonic the Hedgehog 2 | Sega | Sega | Genesis | |
| 1993 | Mortal Kombat | Midway | Acclaim | Genesis | |
| 1994 | Donkey Kong Country | Rare | Nintendo | SNES | |
| 1995 | Donkey Kong Country | Rare | Nintendo | SNES | |
| 1996 | Super Mario 64 | Nintendo EAD | Nintendo | N64 | |
| 1997 | Mario Kart 64 | Nintendo EAD | Nintendo | N64 | |
| 1998 | The Legend of Zelda: Ocarina of Time | Nintendo EAD | Nintendo | N64 | |
| 1999 | Pokémon Red / Blue / Yellow | Game Freak | Nintendo | Game Boy | |
| 2000 | Pokémon Gold / Silver | Game Freak | Nintendo | GBC | |
| 2001 | Pokémon Gold / Silver / Crystal | Game Freak | Nintendo | GBC | |
| 2002 | Grand Theft Auto: Vice City | Rockstar North | Take-Two Interactive | PS2 | |
| 2003 | Madden NFL 2004 | EA Tiburon | Electronic Arts | PS2 | |
| 2004 | Grand Theft Auto: San Andreas | Rockstar North | Take-Two Interactive | PS2 | |
| 2005 | Madden NFL 06 | EA Tiburon | Electronic Arts | PS2 | |
| 2006 | Madden NFL 07 | EA Tiburon | Electronic Arts | PS2 | |
| 2007 | Halo 3 | Bungie | Microsoft Game Studios | Xbox 360 | |
| 2008 | Wii Play | Nintendo EAD | Nintendo | Wii | |
| 2009 | Call of Duty: Modern Warfare 2 | Infinity Ward | Activision Blizzard | Multi-platform | |
| 2010 | Call of Duty: Black Ops | Treyarch | Activision Blizzard | Multi-platform | |
| 2011 | Call of Duty: Modern Warfare 3 | Infinity Ward, Sledgehammer Games | Activision Blizzard | Multi-platform | |
| 2012 | Call of Duty: Black Ops II | Treyarch | Activision Blizzard | Multi-platform | |
| 2013 | Grand Theft Auto V | Rockstar North | Take-Two Interactive | Multi-platform | |
| 2014 | Call of Duty: Advanced Warfare | Sledgehammer Games | Activision Blizzard | Multi-platform | |
| 2015 | Call of Duty: Black Ops III | Treyarch | Activision Blizzard | Multi-platform | |
| 2016 | Call of Duty: Infinite Warfare | Infinity Ward | Activision Blizzard | Multi-platform | |
| 2017 | Call of Duty: WWII | Sledgehammer Games | Activision Blizzard | Multi-platform | |
| 2018 | Red Dead Redemption 2 | Rockstar Studios | Take-Two Interactive | Multi-platform | |
| 2019 | Call of Duty: Modern Warfare | Infinity Ward | Activision Blizzard | Multi-platform | |
| 2020 | Call of Duty: Black Ops Cold War | Treyarch, Raven Software | Activision Blizzard | Multi-platform | |
| 2021 | Call of Duty: Vanguard | Sledgehammer Games | Activision Blizzard | Multi-platform | |
| 2022 | Call of Duty: Modern Warfare II | Infinity Ward | Activision Blizzard | Multi-platform | |
| 2023 | Hogwarts Legacy | Avalanche Software | Warner Bros. Games | Multi-platform | |
| 2024 | Call of Duty: Black Ops 6 | Treyarch, Raven Software | Microsoft Gaming | Multi-platform | |
| 2025 | Battlefield 6 | Battlefield Studios | Electronic Arts | Multi-platform | |

=== Best-selling PlayStation games ===
The following titles are the best-selling games of all time on PlayStation consoles, according to Circana as of 2025.

Gross revenue
| Rank | Title | Year | Developer | Publisher |
|---|---|---|---|---|
| 1 | Grand Theft Auto V | 2013 | Rockstar North | Take-Two Interactive |
| 2 | Call of Duty: Modern Warfare | 2019 | Infinity Ward | Activision Blizzard |
| 3 | Red Dead Redemption 2 | 2018 | Rockstar Studios | Take-Two Interactive |
| 4 | Call of Duty: Modern Warfare II | 2022 | Infinity Ward | Activision Blizzard |
| 5 | Call of Duty: Black Ops 6 | 2024 | Treyarch, Raven Software | Microsoft Gaming |
| 6 | Call of Duty: Black Ops Cold War | 2020 | Treyarch, Raven Software | Activision Blizzard |
| 7 | Minecraft | 2011 | Mojang Studios | Microsoft Gaming |
| 8 | Call of Duty: Black Ops II | 2012 | Treyarch | Activision Blizzard |
| 9 | Grand Theft Auto: San Andreas | 2004 | Rockstar North | Take-Two Interactive |
| 10 | Guitar Hero III: Legends of Rock | 2007 | Neversoft | Activision |

Unit sales
| Rank | Title | Year | Developer | Publisher |
|---|---|---|---|---|
| 1 | Grand Theft Auto V | 2013 | Rockstar North | Take-Two Interactive |
| 2 | Minecraft | 2011 | Mojang Studios | Microsoft Gaming |
| 3 | Red Dead Redemption 2 | 2018 | Rockstar Studios | Take-Two Interactive |
| 4 | Grand Theft Auto: San Andreas | 2004 | Rockstar North | Take-Two Interactive |
| 5 | Call of Duty: Modern Warfare | 2019 | Infinity Ward | Activision Blizzard |
| 6 | Marvel's Spider-Man | 2018 | Insomniac Games | Sony Interactive Entertainment |
| 7 | Call of Duty: Black Ops III | 2015 | Treyarch | Activision Blizzard |
| 8 | Call of Duty: Black Ops Cold War | 2020 | Treyarch, Raven Software | Activision Blizzard |
| 9 | Grand Theft Auto: Vice City | 2002 | Rockstar North | Take-Two Interactive |
| 10 | Call of Duty: Modern Warfare II | 2022 | Infinity Ward | Activision Blizzard |

== History ==
=== 1940s ===
The beginning of video games can be traced to the year 1940, when American nuclear physicist Edward Condon designed a computer capable of playing the traditional game Nim. This device would have tens of thousands of people play it even though the computer won 90% of the time. Seven years later an American television pioneer, Thomas T. Goldsmith, Jr., patented an oscilloscope displayed device that challenged players to fire a gun at a target.

=== 1950s ===
At the start of the 1950s another American, Claude Shannon, wrote basic guidelines on programming a computer. Although OXO was created in England by the year 1952, the findings and inventions of the Americans described helped make it possible. The U.S. military dove into the computer age with the creation of a game titled Hutspiel. Considered a war game, Hutspiel depicted NATO and Soviet commanders waging war. The IBM 701 computer received programs such as Blackjack and Checkers. A later IBM model featured a chess program that was capable of evaluating four ply ahead. The 1950s also included the largely forgotten tennis game created by Willy Higinbotham that anticipated the famous game Pong.

=== 1960s ===
The military continued to take part in video gaming in the 1960s when, shortly after the Cuban Missile Crisis, the Defense Department created a war game known as STAGE (Simulation of Total Atomic Global Exchange). STAGE was created to be political propaganda that showcased how the U.S. would be victorious in a Thermonuclear war with the Soviet Union. The idea of video games that were usable on televisions was conceived by the engineer Ralph Baer and with the help of a team, Baer completed two successful TV games in this decade. The first interactive media computer game, Spacewar, eventually had the future founders of Atari create an arcade game of it titled Computer Space that became the first video arcade game ever released.

=== 1970s ===
The 1970s included the birth of the video game console. The first console released was titled Magnavox Odyssey and the foundation of Atari occurred around the same time, marking the start of Pong's development. Upon Pong's completion it became the hottest selling Christmas product of 1975. The evolution of the console was incredibly rapid. A few years after their invention, consoles received microprocessors and programmable ROM cartridge based games, allowing users the ability to change games by simply switching cartridges. Important consoles released at this time were the Telstar, Fairchild Channel F, and Atari 2600. Arcade games also received advances with the game Space Invaders, which allowed high scores to be tracked and displayed. A year later the game Asteroids built on the idea and gave high scorers the ability to enter initials by their scores.

=== 1980s ===
The technological advances of the late 1970s led to the introduction of the Intellivision in 1980, which featured better video game graphics but a higher price tag. In two years, the Commodore 64 changed the market by not only being the most powerful console of the time but also the cheapest. With the lowered prices, popularity of the video game industry continued to grow and the first video game magazine, Electronic Games, was printed. However, attempts to copycat on the success of the Atari 2600 saturated the market, and the video game crash of 1983 decimated the industry in the United States. With the American-produced games on the downswing, Nintendo successfully launched the Nintendo Entertainment System in America in 1985, revitalizing the market with the introduction of the third and fourth generation of home consoles such as the Master System, Game Boy, Sega Genesis, Atari 7800, and the TurboGrafx-16, with systems transitioning to support 3D graphics and support for optical media rather than cartridges.

=== 1990s ===
The 1990s saw the introduction of the Super NES, PlayStation, Nintendo 64, Tamagotchi, and Dreamcast, whose sales brought the damaged video game industry back to life. During this decade, the PlayStation was considered the most popular console when its 20 millionth unit sold. In 1993, the video game industries' first debate began and its focus was on violence found in video games. This debate fueled Senator Joseph Lieberman's desire to ban all violent games; from this investigation the Entertainment Software Rating Board was created in 1994, giving all games a printed suggested age rating on their packaging.

=== 2000s ===
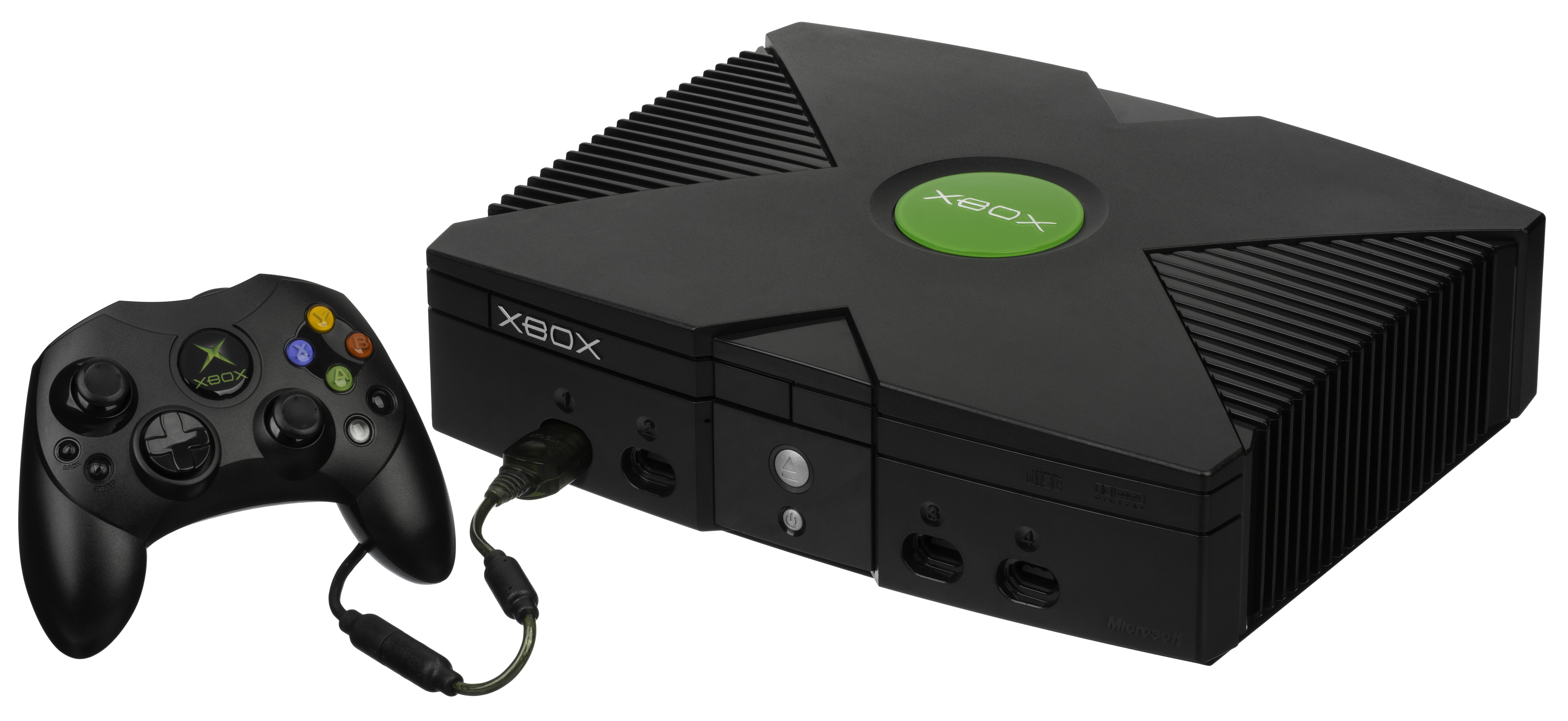
Xbox (2001 console)

The 2000s further increased Sony's popularity when its PlayStation 2 video game console had such a high American consumer demand that it actually affected the console's availability to be purchased during the first few shipments; the PlayStation 2 remains the best-selling console of all time in the United States and worldwide. Microsoft and Nintendo also saw this popularity with the release of their own sixth and seventh generation of consoles, the Xbox and GameCube, respectively. Mass availability of the Internet introduced online connectivity on consoles for multiplayer games as well as digital storefronts to sell games. Digital storefronts also enabled the growth of the indie game market, expanding from computers onto consoles over this decade. Motion control-enabled games, popularized by the Wii console, grew in popularity. According to estimates from Nielsen Media Research, approximately 45.7 million U.S. households in 2006 (or approximately 40 percent of approximately 114.4 million) owned a dedicated home video game console.

=== 2010s ===
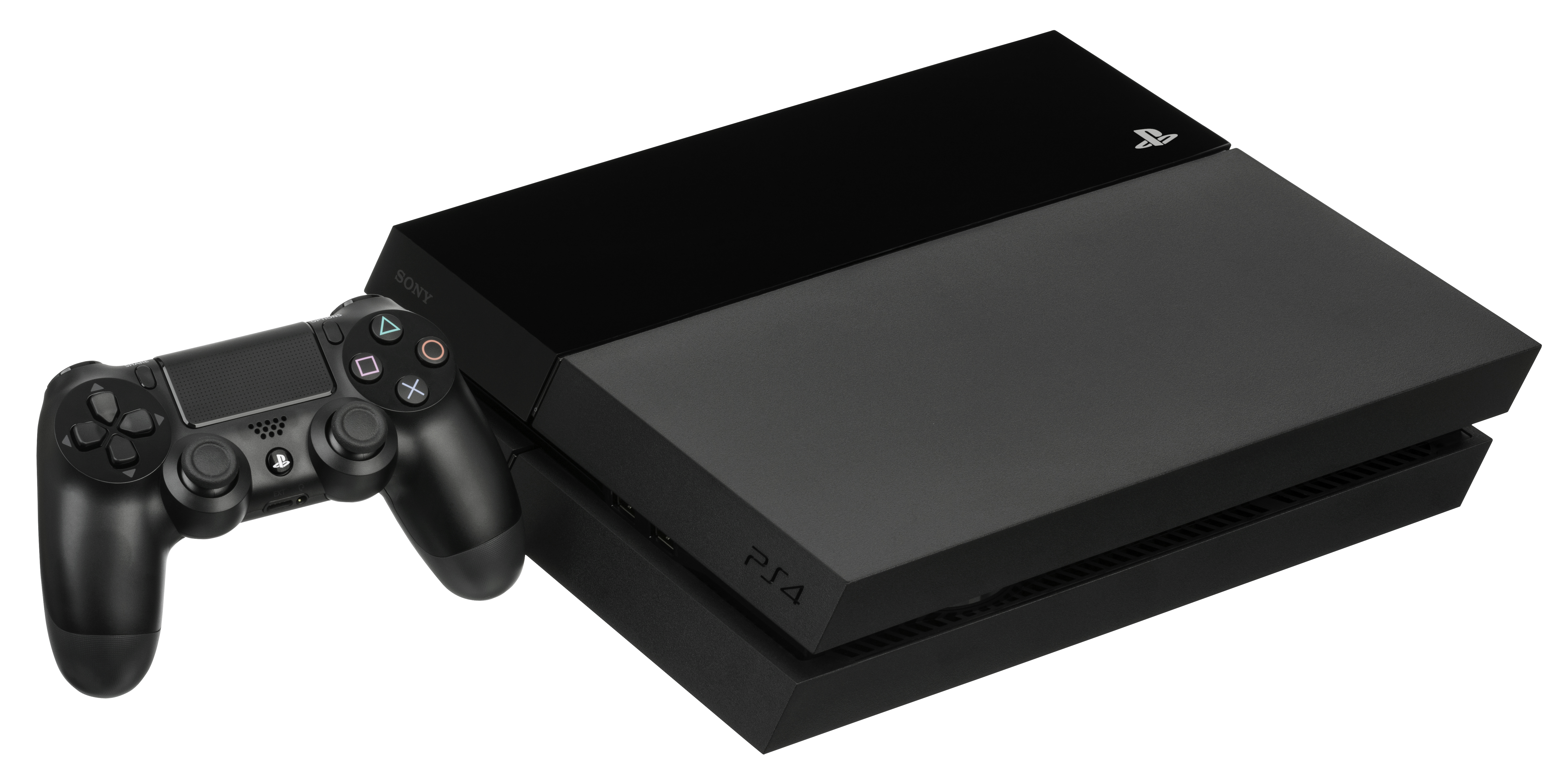
PlayStation 4 designed by American video game designer Mark Cerny

Within the 2010s, a larger shift towards casual and mobile gaming on smartphones and tablets became significant, in part due to a wider demographic of video game players drawing in more female and older players. The concept of games as a service, emerged as a trend for developers and publishers to have long-tail monetization of a game well after release. Continuing from the previous decade, a large number of independently developed video games emerged as games on par with those from major publishers, made easier to promote and distribute through digital storefronts on personal computers, consoles, and mobile store markets. All three major console manufacturers released next generation consoles: Xbox One, PlayStation 4, Wii U, and Nintendo Switch. Major developments in mixed reality games - both augmented reality and virtual reality - grew in popularity during the 2010s as the cost of required hardware dropped. Esports became a significant market in the United States after its initial popularity in Eastern Asia countries. In 2015, 51 percent of U.S. households owned a home video game console according to an Entertainment Software Association annual industry report.

=== 2020s ===
Microsoft and Sony have released their successors to their eighth generation consoles in November 2020, the Xbox Series X/S and PlayStation 5. Both systems support high-definition graphics, real-time ray-tracing, game streaming and cloud-based gaming. Nintendo has continued with their Nintendo Switch at the beginning of this decade.

With the COVID-19 pandemic and lockdown causing people to stay in their homes, people picked up video games which caused a big boom in sales throughout 2019 all the way into 2021. The NPD Group reported that video game sales in North America in March 2020 were up 34% from those in March 2019, video game hardware up by 63%. Game companies also saw this as an opportunity to expand what they could do to entertain, so Epic Games hosted the first and second ever live in-game concert through Fortnite, first with Marshmello and second with "an in-game Travis Scott concert saw over 12 million concurrent views from players".

The American video game industry experienced significant resurgence in mergers and acquisitions between 2020 and 2024. Video game companies anticipated that the substantial growth observed during the pandemic would persist afterward, prompting many firms to explore mergers and acquisitions. Between 2020 and 2024, 8 out of the 20 most expensive video game acquisitions in history were made by American publishers, with major American publishers such as Microsoft Gaming, Sony Interactive Entertainment, Take-Two Interactive, and Electronic Arts each making at least one acquisition.

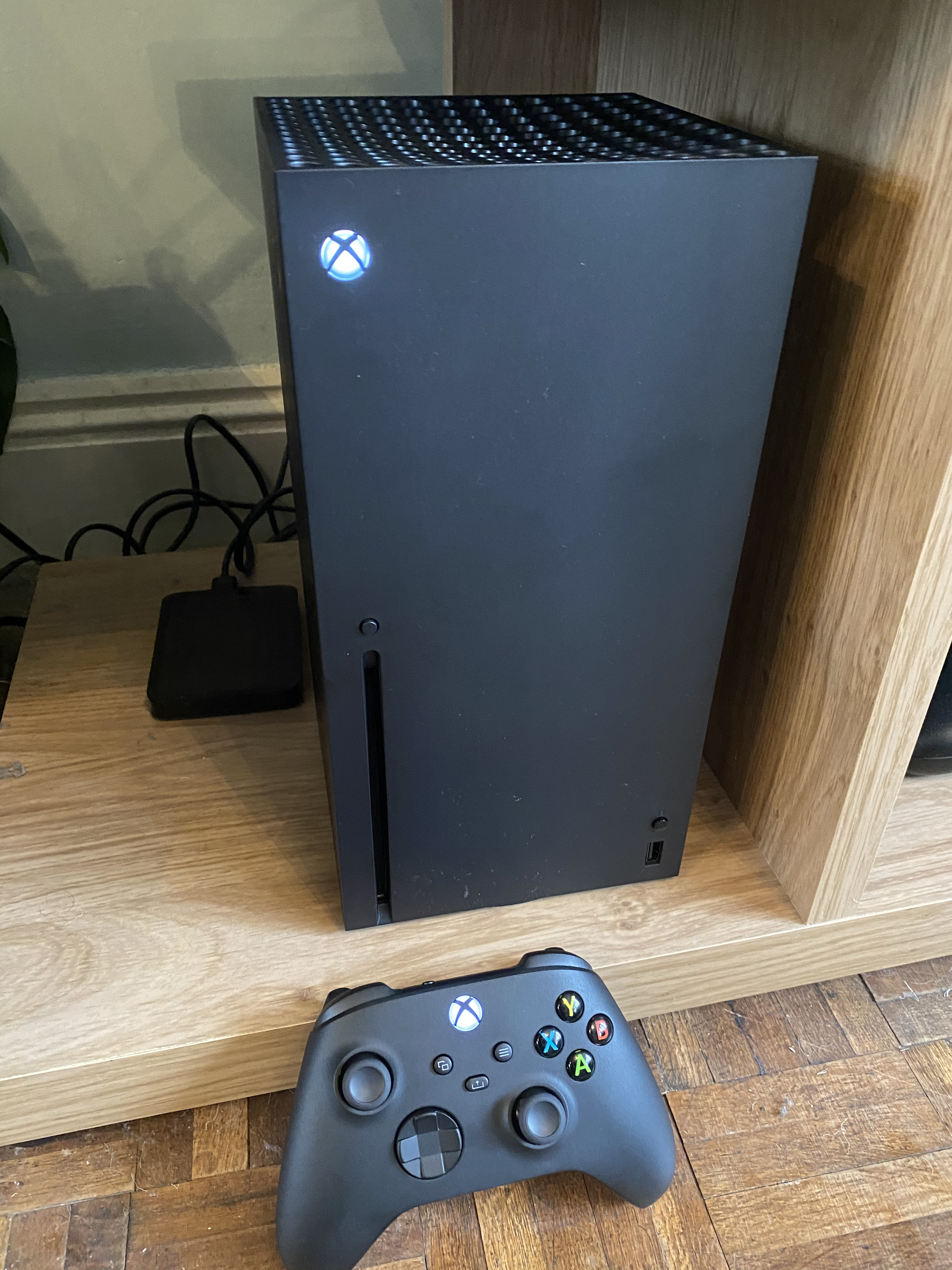
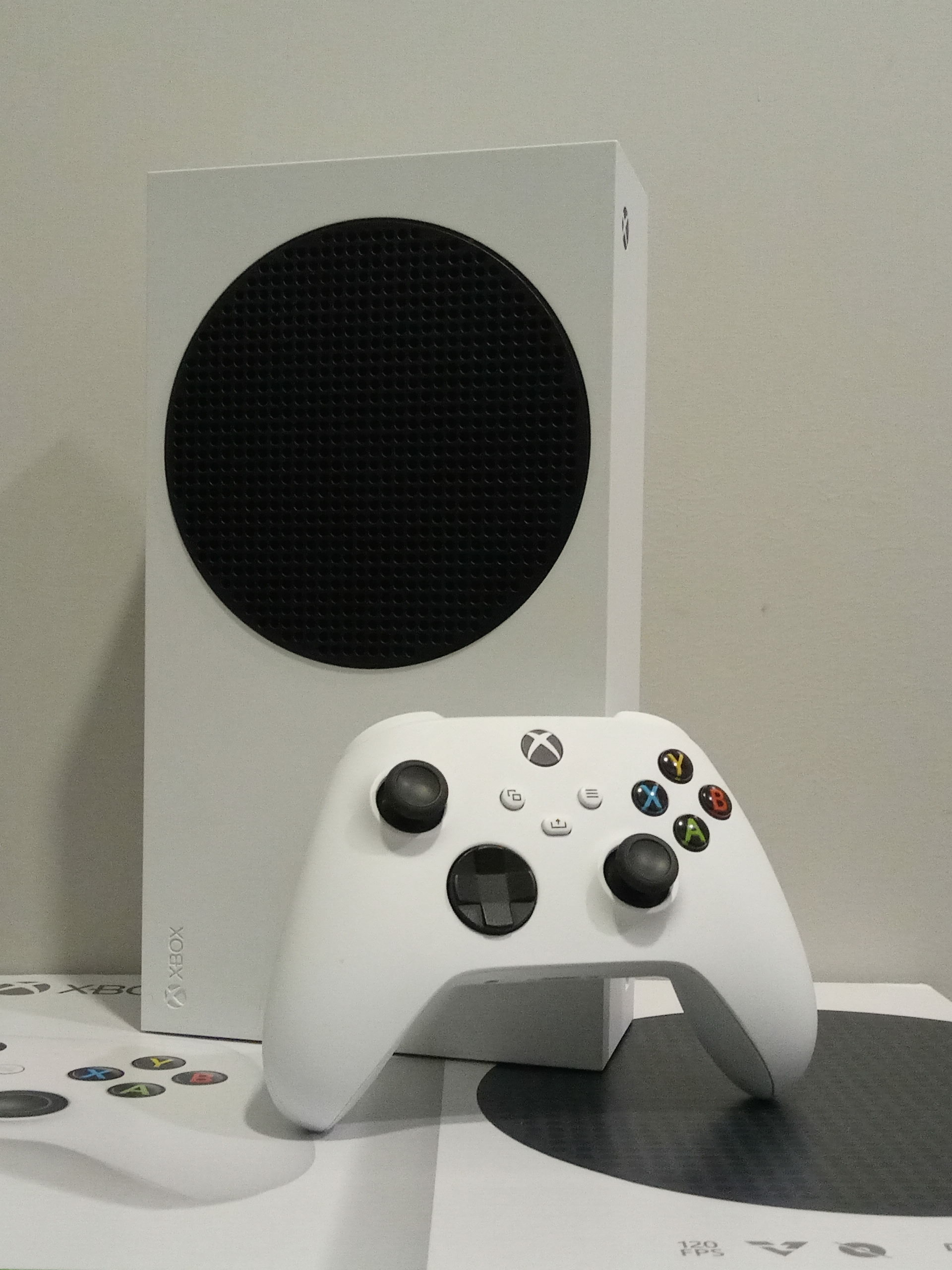
Xbox Series X/S

There have been widespread layoffs in the US video game business starting in 2023 and going into 2024. The layoffs were the result of multiple causes coming together, rather than occurring all at once. The COVID-19 epidemic drove up demand for video games. In anticipation of continued growth, this prompted businesses to make large investments in staff expansion, mergers, and acquisitions. But when the market recovered and the world opened up, the quick development proved unsustainable, and businesses were forced to make cuts as their operating costs ballooned. According to Mat Piscatella, executive director of Circana (The NPD Group), the most optimistic forecast for the American video game industry in 2024 forecasts a possible decline of roughly 2%. On the other hand, a more negative outlook would predict a 10% decrease, with an even bigger drop possible if things become much worse. DDM Games reported that the industry is presently going through a "reset phase." Businesses are using layoffs, divestitures, and closures as a means of reorganizing their operations. Since the growth surge brought on by the epidemic has receded, recalibration is now necessary.

Similar to the voice actor strike in 2016-2017, SAG-AFTRA initiated a labor strike in July 2024 against all video game companies which were signed on the Internative Media Agreement due to concerns over lack of protections for video game performers, as well as the images and voices of other actors, from AI. The strike lasted nearly a year, with the union and video game company reaching an agreement by June 2025 and union members voting in favor of the new agreement by July 2025.

As a result of the tariff policy in the second Trump administration and the global memory supply shortage, all three console hardware manufacturers, Microsoft, Sony, and Nintendo, raised the price of their consoles in the U.S., generally citing "market conditions".

== Cultural impact on the global gaming industry ==
With RPG video game series such as Dungeons & Dragons, The Elder Scrolls, and Fallout, and first-person shooters series such as Doom, Halo, Half-Life, and BioShock, the American video game industry has heavily influenced the global gaming industry. Some of the best-selling and most popular video games ever made such as Call of Duty, Fortnite, World of Warcraft, Overwatch, League of Legends, Valorant, CSGO, Dota 2, Apex Legends and Roblox were made in the United States. Some of the most revolutionary video games such as Skyrim, Half-Life, and BioShock, were also made in the United States. Alongside video games, American companies such as Epic Games have also contributed to the video game industry with high-technology. Unreal Engine and Unity are considered to be one of the best and most popular video game engines of all time. With the rise of Steam in the mid-2010s and easy access to video game making tools and engines, it sparked the rise of Indie games. The United States has some of the largest and most respected and popular video game news cites and journalists in the world. Some of them are Game Informer, Metacritic, IGN, GameSpot, GamesRadar+, The Verge, Kotaku, Polygon, and Giantbomb. Some of the most respected video game journalists, such as Jason Schreier, are also from the United States.

=== American video game personalities ===
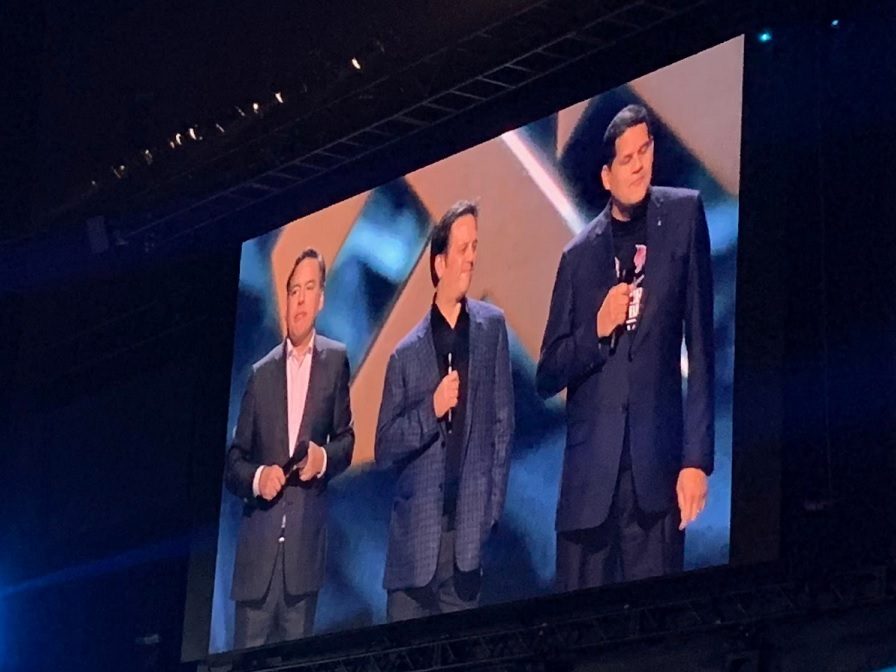
Sony Interactive Entertainment America president Shawn Layden, Xbox head Phil Spencer, and Nintendo of America president Reggie Fils-Aimé at The Game Awards 2018

Some of the most influential video directors, designers, developers, journalists and business people are American. Notable American video game personalities include: Civilization creator Sid Meier; Valve and Steam founder Gabe Newell; The Elder Scrolls producer Todd Howard; Half-Life: Alyx, Firewatch, and The Walking Dead writer Sean Vanaman; The Last of Us creators Neil Druckmann and Bruce Straley; video game designer Chris Avellon; Microsoft Gaming CEO Phil Spencer; Uncharted creator Amy Hennig; Activision Blizzard former CEO Bobby Kotick; God of War and Twisted Metal co-creator David Jaffe; Double Fine founder Tim Schafer; Mortal Kombat creator Ed Boon; God of War (2018) director Cory Barlog; Crash Bandicoot co-creator Jason Rubin; God of War III and Star Wars Jedi director Stig Asmussen; video game journalist Jason Schreier; Fallout: New Vegas director Josh Sawyer; inXile Entertainment CEO Brian Fargo; Doom and Quake creators John Romero and John Carmack; BioShock creator Ken Levine; co-founder of Bungie and Halo and Destiny co-creator, Jason Jones; Gears of War creator Cliff Bleszinski; former Nintendo of America president Reggie Fils-Aimé; former Blizzard Entertainment president Mike Ybarra; and game and console designer Mark Cerny.

=== Criticisms ===
While the rise of American multiplayer games has grown the global video game industry, many video game journalists and gamers have heavily criticized some of the decisions and changes made by American companies, such as the addition of micro-transactions in video games. After the release and huge success of The Legend of Zelda: Breath of the Wild in 2017, Elden Ring in 2022 and Baldur's Gate 3 in 2023, complaints started pouring in that the American gaming industry was lacking far behind and not investing enough in innovation such as Japanese and European gaming companies.

=== Best-selling American games worldwide ===
This is the list of best selling video games worldwide developed or co-developed by American developers, based on the best selling video games article.

| Title | Sales | Developer | Publisher | Ref. |
|---|---|---|---|---|
| Tetris (EA) | 100,000,000 | EA Mobile | Electronic Arts | |
| Red Dead Redemption 2 | 70,000,000 | Rockstar Games | Rockstar Games | |
| Terraria | 60,700,000 | Re-Logic | Re-Logic | |
| The Elder Scrolls V: Skyrim | 60,000,000 | Bethesda Game Studios | Bethesda Softworks | |
| Overwatch | 50,000,000 | Blizzard Entertainment | Activision Blizzard | |
| Call of Duty: Black Ops III | 43,000,000 | Treyarch | Activision Blizzard | |
| Call of Duty: Modern Warfare | 41,000,000 | Infinity Ward | Activision Blizzard | |
| Stardew Valley | 41,000,000 | ConcernedApe | ConcernedApe | |
| World of Warcraft | 40,600,000 | Blizzard Entertainment | Activision Blizzard | |
| Counter-Strike: Global Offensive | 40,000,000 | Valve, Hidden Path Entertainment | Valve | |
| Hogwarts Legacy | 40,000,000 | Avalanche Software | Warner Bros. Games | |
| The Sims 4 | 36,000,000 | Maxis | Electronic Arts | |
| Call of Duty: Black Ops Cold War | 30,000,000 | Treyarch / Raven Software | Activision Blizzard | |
| Borderlands 2 | 30,000,000 | Gearbox Software | Take-Two Interactive | |
| Call of Duty: Vanguard | 30,000,000 | Sledgehammer Games | Activision Blizzard | |
| Diablo III | 30,000,000 | Blizzard Entertainment | Activision Blizzard | |
| The Walking Dead | 28,000,000 | Telltale Games | Telltale Games | |
| Call of Duty: Modern Warfare 3 | 26,500,000 | Infinity Ward / Sledgehammer | Activision Blizzard | |
| Call of Duty: Black Ops | 26,200,000 | Treyarch | Activision Blizzard | |
| Fallout 4 | 25,000,000 | Bethesda Game Studios | Bethesda Softworks | |
| Call of Duty: Black Ops II | 24,200,000 | Treyarch | Activision Blizzard | |
| Kinect Adventures! | 24,000,000 | Good Science Studio | Xbox Game Studios | |
| God of War | 23,000,000 | Santa Monica Studio | Sony Interactive Entertainment | |
| Red Dead Redemption | 23,000,000 | Rockstar San Diego | Take-Two Interactive | |
| Call of Duty: Modern Warfare 2 | 22,700,000 | Infinity Ward | Activision Blizzard | |
| Marvel’s Spider-Man | 22,100,000 | Insomniac Games | Sony Interactive Entertainment | |
| Borderlands 3 | 22,000,000 | Gearbox Software | Take-Two Interactive | |
| The Last of Us | 20,000,000 | Naughty Dog | Sony Interactive Entertainment | |

== Video game publishers ==
Logos of the top 10 biggest video game publishers in the US

Some of the largest video game companies in the world are based in the United States. There are 444 publishers, developers, and hardware companies in California alone.

=== Sony Interactive Entertainment ===
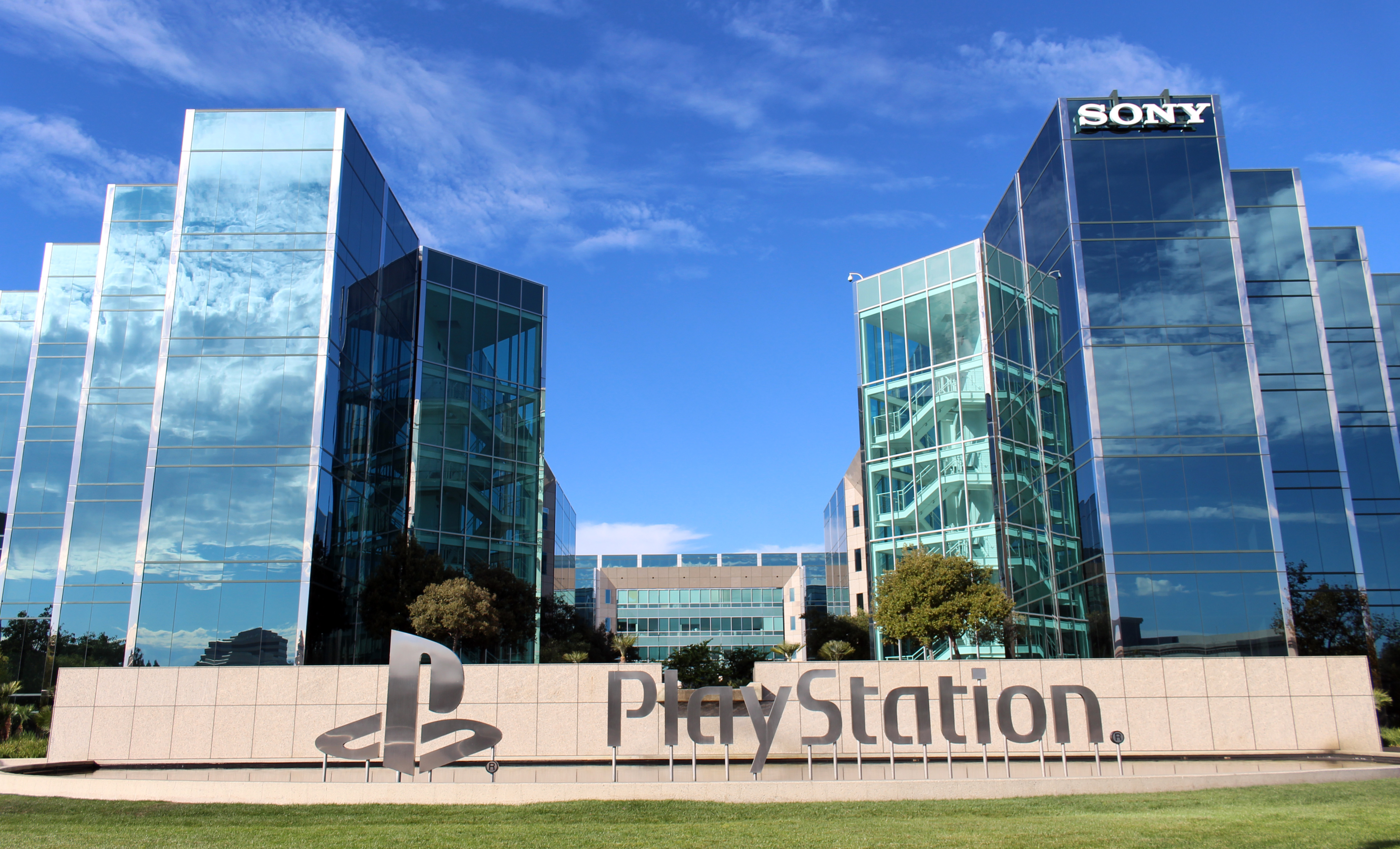
Sony Interactive Entertainment's San Mateo, California headquarters

Sony Interactive Entertainment is gaming company operating as an independent subsidiary and video game publishing arm of multinational conglomerate Sony Group Corporation. It has its global headquarters in San Mateo and is incorporated in Delaware. It has its own executive leadership team. In 2016, Sony Group moved Sony Interactive Entertainment's headquarters from Tokyo to California. With over 4,000 developers and 19 studios, Sony Interactive Entertainment is one of the biggest video game companies in the word. 10 out of 19 studios are American studios. In 2022, Sony Interactive Entertainment made a major investment in America and acquired Bungie for $3.7 billion. Sony Interactive Entertainment owns popular American video game studios such as Naughty Dog, Santa Monica Studio, Insomniac Games, Sucker Punch and franchises such as God of War, The Last of Us, and Uncharted. God of War Ragnarok has sold over 5.1 million units in 1 week and 11 million units in 2 months, making it the fastest selling first-party game in PlayStation history. In 2023 Marvel's Spider-Man 2 became the fastest-selling PlayStation first-party game of all time, selling 2.5 million units in 24 hours.

=== Take-Two Interactive ===
In September 1993, Ryan Brant established the American video game holding firm Take-Two Interactive Software, Inc. in New York City. Rockstar Games and 2K, two significant publishing labels owned by Take-Two Interactive, both have internal game production teams. Take-Two established the Private Division label to assist independent developer publication, and more recently revealed Intercept Games as a new inside company for the label. The business also established Ghost Story Games, rebranding Irrational Games, a former 2K firm. To establish itself in the market for mobile games, the company bought Socialpoint, Playdots, and Nordeus. Additionally, the company controls 50% of the professional esports league NBA 2K League. In 2013, Grand Theft Auto V was the most popular game. Within 24 hours of its release, Take-Two Interactive sold 11.21 million copies of Grand Theft Auto V, earning a total of more than US$815 million. Three days after its debut, when sales of the game surpassed $1 billion, it set a record for fastest-selling entertainment product in history. Take-Two's combined portfolio includes franchises such as BioShock, Borderlands, Grand Theft Auto, NBA 2K, Max Payne and Red Dead among others. In 2022, Take-Two Interactive acquired mobile video game company Zynga for $12.7 billion.

=== Electronic Arts (EA) ===
Electronic Arts (EA) is the world's largest independent video game publisher by revenue and market value. American video game developer Electronic Arts is based in Redwood City, California. Trip Hawkins, an Apple employee, founded the business in May 1982. It was a pioneer in the early home computer gaming market and referred to the designers and programmers behind its games as "software artists". With 12,900 video game developers, Electronic Arts is one of the biggest video game publishers in the world. Respawn Entertainment, BioWare, Dice, PopCap, are some of the studies under Electronic Arts. With the success of EA Sports and game series such as FIFA, NHL, NBA Live, Madden NFL, Dragon Age, Mass Effect, Dead Space, and Star Wars Jedi, Electronic Arts became one of the biggest video game companies in the world.

=== Microsoft Gaming ===
Microsoft Corporation's gaming division led by Phil Spencer, CEO of Microsoft Gaming. Microsoft Gaming consists of Activision Blizzard, Xbox Game Studios, and Bethesda Softworks. It is the third-largest gaming company worldwide by revenue and the largest video game employer in the United States.

==== Xbox Game Studios ====
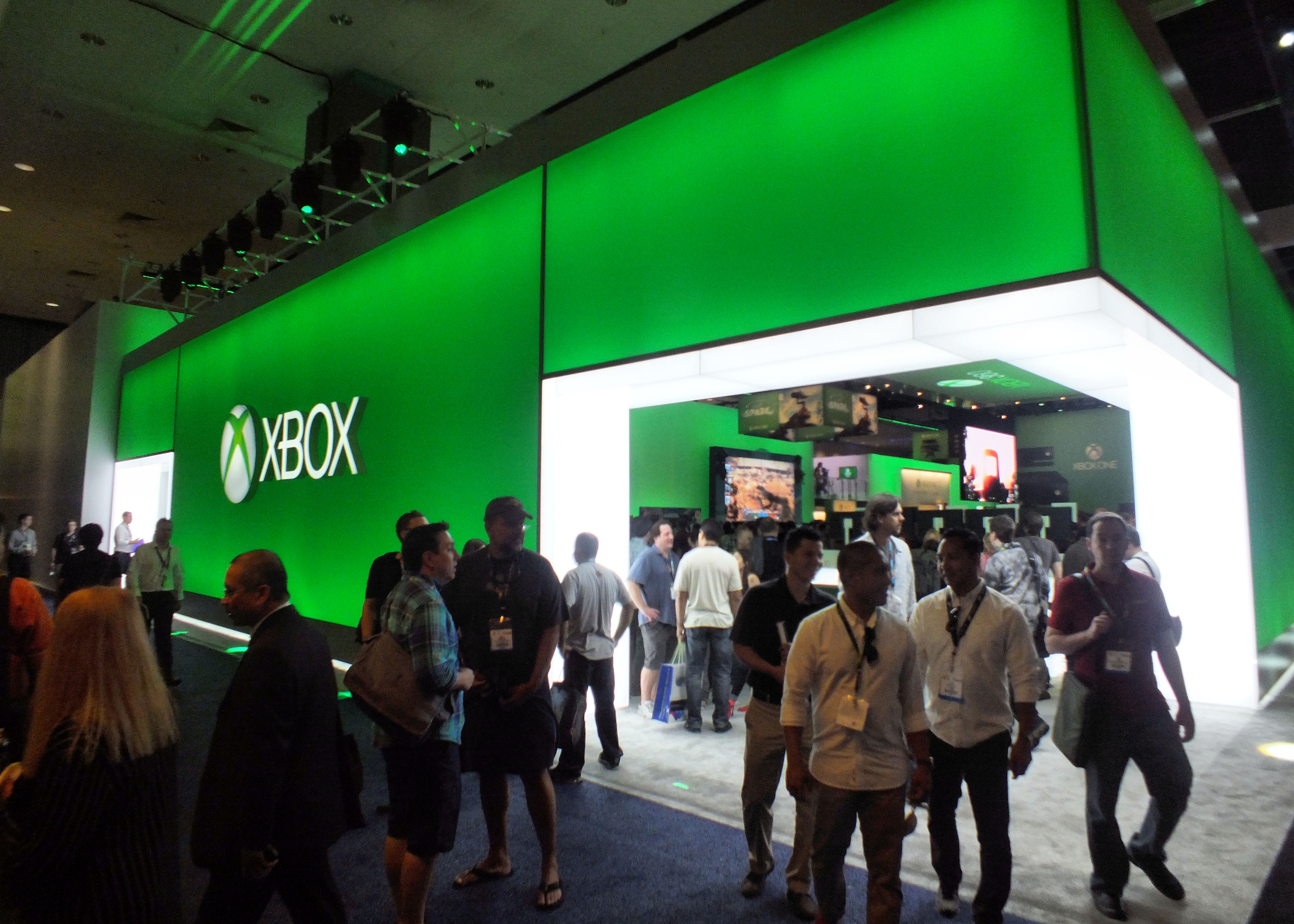
Xbox stand at E3 2013

Xbox Game Studios is the gaming subsidiary and video game publishing arm of American software company Microsoft. In 2001 Microsoft released its first Xbox console. The most successful console released by Microsoft was the Xbox 360, which sold over 84 million units in 2005. In 2014, Microsoft acquired Mojang, the developers of Minecraft, and currently the best-selling video game of all time for $2.5 billion. In 2021, Microsoft acquired Bethesda Softworks, video game publisher and owner of major video game franchises such as The Elder Scrolls, Fallout, and Doom, for $8.1 billion. In 2022, Microsoft announced that it would be acquiring American video game giant Activision Blizzard for $68.7 billion in an all-cash deal. Microsoft owns 23 studios worldwide with some of the most popular video game studios including Bethesda Game Studios, Id Software, Playground Games, Ninja Theory, Rare, and Arkane Studios. In 2023, Starfield became the most played Xbox next-gen game ever. After Microsoft's acquisition of Activision Blizzard, it became the third-largest gaming company worldwide and the largest video game employer in the United States. Microsoft has acquired a wide range of IPs and studios, including franchises like Call of Duty, Diablo, Warcraft, Overwatch, Starcraft, Crash Bandicoot, Spyro, Guitar Hero, Tony Hawk's, Infinity Ward, Treyarch, Sledgehammer Games, Raven Software, Toys for Bob, Activision, Blizzard Entertainment, King, and many more.

==== Bethesda Softworks ====
Bethesda Softworks is a video game publisher headquartered in Rockville, Maryland. In 1986, Christopher Weaver established the business. Only the publishing role of Bethesda Softworks remained after the company broke off its internal development team into Bethesda Game Studios. ZeniMax was acquired by Microsoft in 2021, and Microsoft insisted that ZeniMax would continue to run as a distinct firm. Bethesda Softworks has published some of the most popular and best-selling games, including The Elder Scrolls V: Skyrim, Fallout 4 and Doom Eternal. On June 15, 2023, Bethesda announced that Skyrim had sold over 60 million copies, making it the best-selling American video game ever made and 7th best-selling game of all time. Bethesda announced that Starfield has reached over 6 million players, making it Bethesda's biggest video game launch ever.

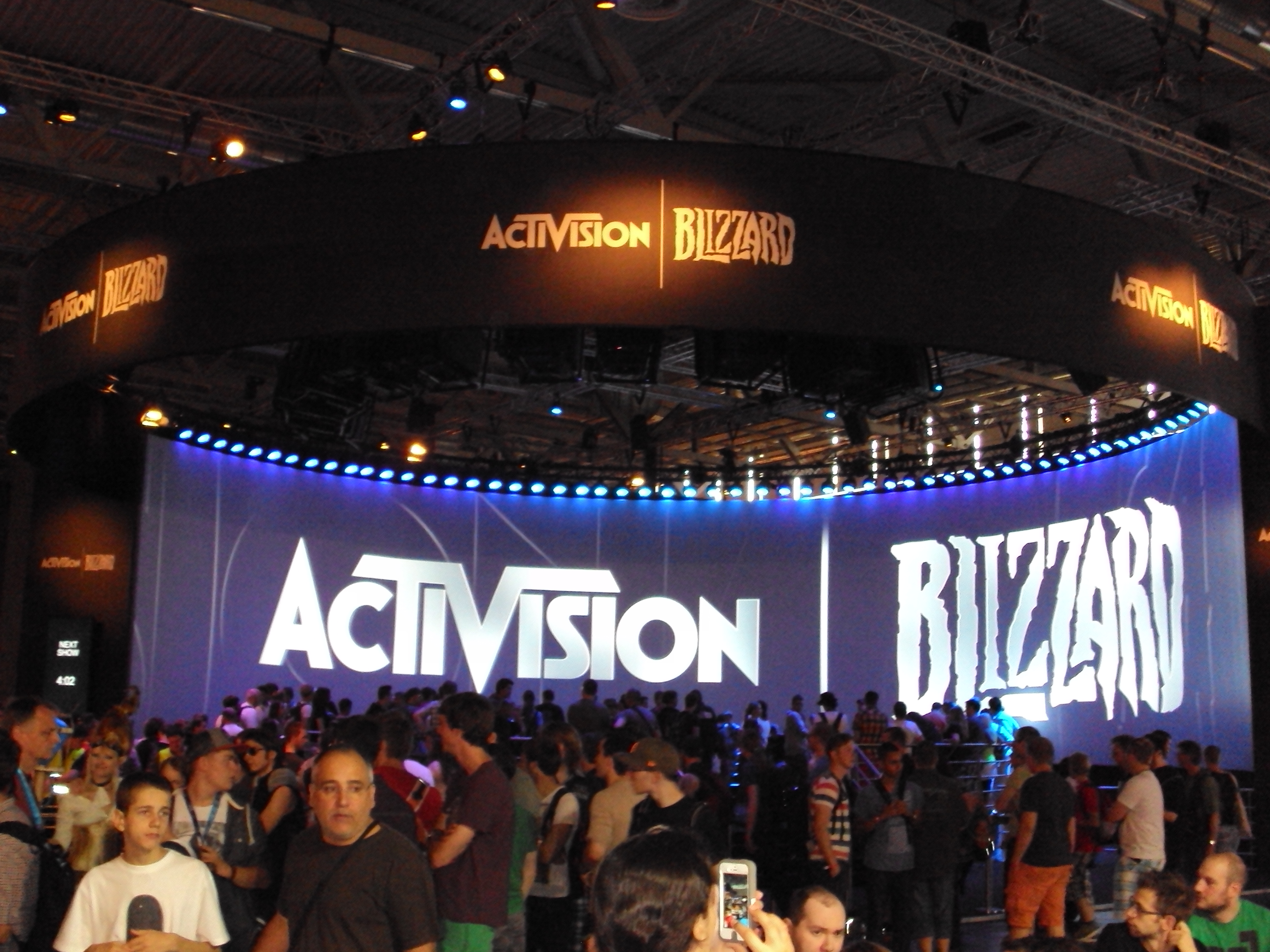
Activision Blizzard at Gamescom 2013

==== Activision Blizzard ====
Activision Blizzard was founded in July 2008 through the merger of two video game publishers, Activision and Blizzard Entertainment. Activision Blizzard is the company that makes and owns some of the most popular video games in the industry, including Call of Duty, Overwatch, World of Warcraft, Crash Bandicoot, Hearthstone, Candy Crush, and Diablo. Microsoft announced its intent to acquire Activision Blizzard for $68.7 billion on January 18, 2022. If approved, Activision Blizzard would become a division of Xbox Game Studios. Call of Duty is the 4th best-selling video game franchise of all time, with over 430 million sales. Call of Duty series directly generated over $800 million on PlayStation in the United States alone in 2021. Call of Duty: Modern Warfare II became the fastest selling and most profitable Call of Duty game of all time, grossing over $1 billion in just 10 days. Diablo IV became the fastest-selling game in Blizzard Entertainment's history. Diablo IV has generated $666 million in revenue within the first 5 days of launch. Microsoft completed its acquisition of Activision Blizzard on October 13, 2023, and Activision Blizzard became a subsidiary of Microsoft Gaming.

=== Epic Games ===
Epic Games is an American video game and software developer and publisher. Epic Games develops Unreal Engine, a commercially available game engine which also powers their internally developed video games. In 2014, Unreal Engine was named the "most successful video game engine" by Guinness World Records. More than 7.5 million developers are using Unreal Engine according to Epic CEO Tim Sweeney. Epic Games owns video game developers such as Psyonix, Mediatonic and Harmonix and popular video games such as Fortnite, Rocket League and Fall Guys.

=== Valve ===
The American firm Valve Corporation creates, publishes, and distributes digital video games. It is the company behind Half-Life, Counter-Strike, Portal, Team Fortress 2, Left 4 Dead, and Dota, as well as the software distribution platform Steam. Steam is the largest digital distribution platform for PC gaming worldwide. There are over 30,000 titles on Steam, everything from AAA to indie. In 2022, Steam broke a worldwide record with more than 30 million people actively using Steam at the same time. Valve released the Steam Deck, a handheld console, in 2022. The Steam Deck has sold over 1 million units that same year. In 2026, Valve released multiple hardware products including the Steam Controller (2026), Steam Machine, and Steam Frame.

=== Warner Bros. Games ===
Warner Bros. Interactive Entertainment is part of the newly formed global streaming and interactive entertainment unit of Warner Bros. Discovery. Warner Bros Games owns video game development studios such as TT Games, Rocksteady Studios, NetherRealm Studios, Monolith Productions, Avalanche Software, and WB Games Montréal, among others. Warner Bros Games is also the publisher of the Batman: Arkham and Mortal Kombat video game series. Hogwarts Legacy, which was published by Warner Bros., became the best-selling and most profitable video game in Warner Bros. Games history, selling over 12 million units in 2 weeks and grossing over $850 million.

=== Riot Games ===
Based in Los Angeles, California, Riot Games is an American company that creates video games and organizes esports competitions. In February 2011, Chinese video game and tech company Tencent bought 93% of Riot Games for $400 million. Tencent bought the remaining 7 percent on December 16, 2015. In addition to developing various spin-off games and the unrelated popular first-person shooter game Valorant, it was created in September 2006 by Brandon Beck and Marc Merrill with the intention of creating League of Legends. Riot Games was purchased by Tencent, a Chinese corporation, in 2011. Riot Games is one of the fastest growing American video game companies with over 5,500 developers. The company had 24 offices worldwide as of 2018. League of Legends produced $1.75 billion in revenue in 2020 alone.

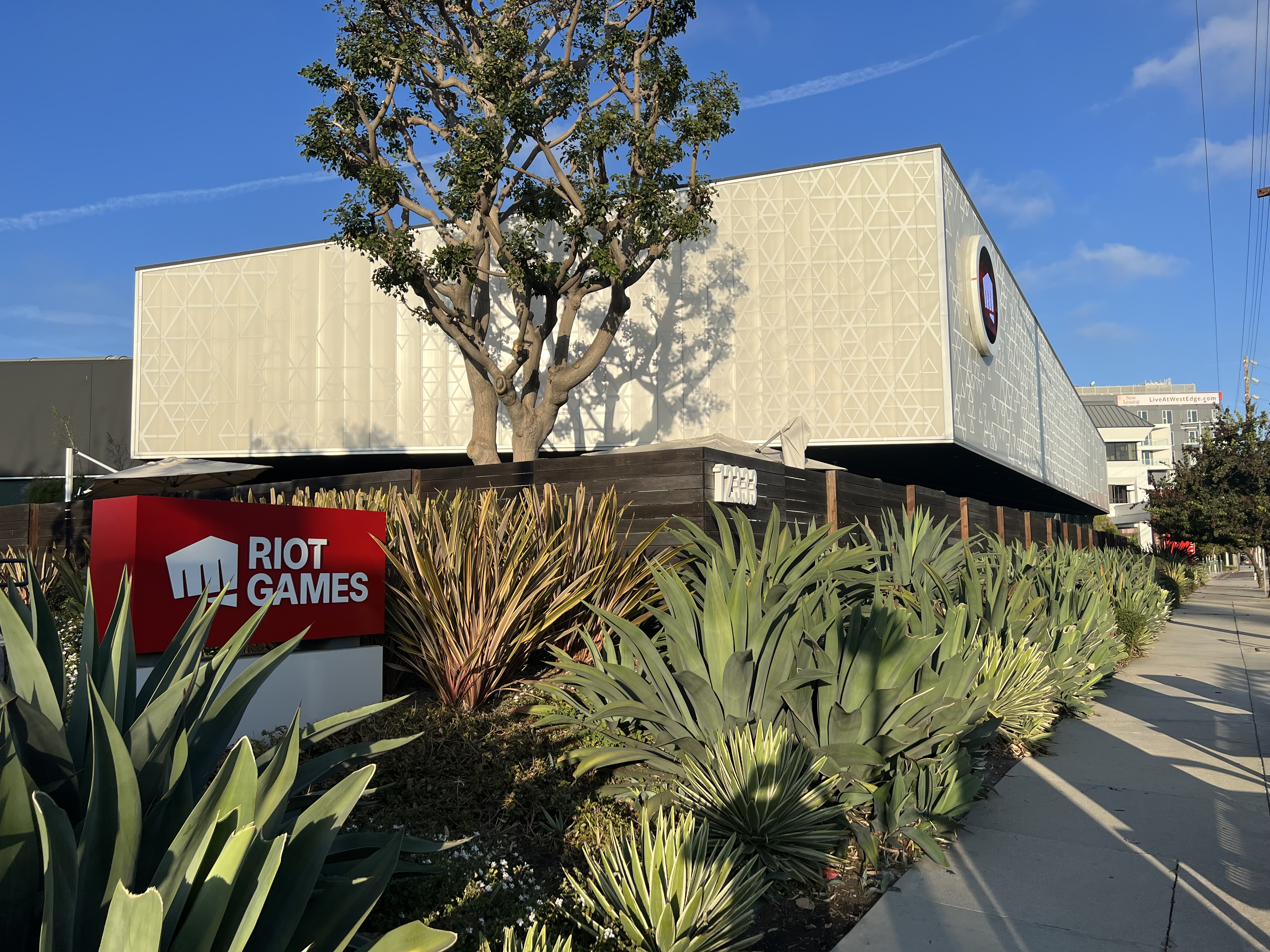
Riot Games headquarters

=== Small and mid-size publishers ===
- Amazon Games
- Wizards of the Coast
- Oculus Studios
- Devolver Digital
- Netflix Games
- Saber Interactive
- Annapurna Interactive
- Roblox Corporation
- Scopely
- tinyBuild
- Finji
- Nicalis
- Re-Logic
- Supergiant Games
- Hi-Rez Studios
- Innersloth
- Telltale Games
- Athlon Games
- Jam City
- Gun Interactive
- Atari, Inc. (formerly GT Interactive)

== Video game mergers/acquisitions ==
The history of American video game company acquisitions is a long and complex one, spanning several decades and involving many different companies. Over the years, the video game industry has undergone numerous mergers, acquisitions, and consolidations, as companies seek to gain a competitive edge, expand their offerings, and diversify their portfolios.

One of the earliest major acquisitions in the video game industry took place in 1988, when Japanese electronics giant Sony acquired Columbia Pictures, a major Hollywood studio with a burgeoning video game division. The acquisition marked the first time that a major electronics manufacturer had acquired a major film studio, and it paved the way for Sony's eventual entry into the video game console market with the launch of the original PlayStation in 1994.

In the years that followed, the video game industry saw a flurry of mergers and acquisitions as companies sought to capitalize on the growing popularity of video games. In 1995, Japanese video game giant Nintendo acquired a majority stake in the British/American software company Rare, which had developed several hit games for Nintendo's consoles. In 1999, French video game publisher Atari SA acquired the U.S. company GT Interactive, which was best known for publishing the popular first-person shooter game Doom.

The early 2000s saw a wave of consolidation in the video game industry, as companies sought to cut costs and increase efficiency. In 2001, Microsoft entered the video game console market with the launch of the Xbox, and it quickly began acquiring a number of studios and developers to bolster its offerings. In 2002, Microsoft acquired Rare from Nintendo, and in 2004 it acquired the video game developer Bungie, which had created the hugely popular Halo series.

Meanwhile, other companies continued to make strategic acquisitions in the video game industry. In 2003, Electronic Arts, one of the largest video game publishers in the world, acquired the sports video game developer Tiburon, which had developed the popular Madden NFL franchise. In 2004, EA acquired the racing game developer Criterion Games, which had created the popular Burnout series.

The trend of consolidation in the video game industry continued through the 2010s, as companies sought to build out their portfolios and expand their reach. In 2011, Sony acquired the cloud-based gaming service Gaikai, which it later used to launch its PlayStation Now subscription service. In 2012, Disney acquired the video game developer and publisher LucasArts, as part of its acquisition of Lucasfilm.

The 2020s saw a massive acceleration in video game company acquisitions. ZeniMax Media (Bethesda) was acquired by Microsoft in March 2021. In January 2022, Sony Interactive Entertainment announced its Bungie acquisition. Take Two Interactive's acquisition of mobile video game maker Zynga is the second most expensive video game acquisition of all time. The biggest video game acquisition of all time was Microsoft's Activision Blizzard merger, announced in February 2022.

The video game industry is dominated by a handful of major players, including Microsoft, Sony, Nintendo, Electronic Arts, and Activision Blizzard. These companies have grown through a combination of organic growth and strategic acquisitions, and they continue to invest heavily in the development of new games and technologies.

=== List of most expensive American video game acquisitions ===
| Acquirer | Target | Year | Deal Value | Ref. |
|---|---|---|---|---|
| Microsoft | Activision Blizzard | 2023 | $75.4 billion | |
| PIF, Silver Lake, Affinity Partners | Electronic Arts | 2026 | $55.0 billion | |
| Take-Two Interactive | Zynga | 2022 | $12.7 billion | |
| Microsoft | ZeniMax Media | 2020 | $8.1 billion | |
| Activision Blizzard | King | 2016 | $5.9 billion | |
| Savvy Games Group | Scopely | 2023 | $4.9 billion | |
| Sony Interactive Entertainment | Bungie | 2022 | $3.7 billion | |
| Microsoft | Mojang | 2014 | $2.5 billion | |
| Electronic Arts | Glu Mobile | 2021 | $2.4 billion | |
| Meta Platforms | Oculus VR | 2014 | $2.0 billion | |
| Zynga | Peak | 2020 | $1.8 billion | |

== Employment ==
=== Education training ===
Video game designers must possess a diverse skill set, requiring extensive training in computer graphics, animation, and software design. In addition to these proficiencies, designers must have a thorough understanding of various console operating systems. Because modern games are highly sophisticated software applications, a foundational knowledge of programming and hardware essentials is required. To enter the industry, prospective designers often pursue courses, certificates, or degrees in computer programming, computer engineering, software development, computer animation, and computer graphics. Furthermore, professionals within the United States can operate on a freelance basis or design games independently using widely available software. While independent game development carries financial and operational risks, the final product functions as a portfolio that demonstrates a designer's capabilities to potential employers.

=== Job market ===
The U.S. video game industry continues to function as a vital source of employment. Currently, video game companies directly and indirectly employ more than 120,000 people in 34 states. The average compensation for direct employees is $90,000, resulting in total national compensation of $2.9 billion.

The current job market for game design in the US is competitive, however, it is expected to have a 32% increase in software publishing jobs, according to the U.S. Department of Labor. An American game designer's salary depends on where the designer works, who they work for, and what kind of designer they are. According to International Game Developers Association's entry level salary report, a new developer could make $50,000 to $80,000 annually; averaging $57,600. Alternatively, Learn Direct reported a starting salary of $37,000 annually.

=== Leading US states with direct in-state video games industry output ===
List of the ten highest U.S. States by video games industry economic output in 2019.

| State | Output | Employment |
|---|---|---|
| California | $44.9 billion | 44,205 |
| Washington | $11.4 billion | 10,870 |
| Texas | $5.1 billion | 9,437 |
| New York | $4.0 billion | 5,730 |
| Florida | $2.2 billion | 4,306 |
| North Carolina | $1.7 billion | 2,849 |
| Illinois | $1.2 billion | 2,169 |
| Massachusetts | $1.2 billion | 1,731 |
| Georgia | $0.9 billion | 1,802 |
| Oregon | $0.9 billion | 1,560 |

List of the ten highest U.S. States with the highest in-state video game industry employment impact in 2023.

| State | Interstate Total Impacts |
|---|---|
| California | 172,150 |
| Washington | 38,249 |
| Texas | 29,517 |
| New York | 17,360 |
| Florida | 13,669 |
| North Carolina | 9,023 |
| Illinois | 6,540 |
| Georgia | 5,632 |
| Massachusetts | 5,408 |
| Pennsylvania | 4,741 |

== Game ratings and government oversight ==
Prior to 1993, there was no standardized content rating body in the United States, but with games becoming more violent and with capabilities to show more realistic graphics, parents, politicians, and other concerned citizens called for government regulation of the industry. The 1993 congressional hearings on video games, putting the recently released Mortal Kombat and Night Trap in the spotlight, drew attention to the industry's lack of a standardized rating system. While individual publishers such as Sega and Nintendo had their own methods of rating games, they were not standardized and allowed discrepancies between different console systems including sales of violent games to minors. Members of Congress threatened to pass legislation that would mandate government oversight of video games if the industry did not create its own solution. The industry responded in 1994 by the formation of the trade group the Interactive Digital Software Association (IDSA), today known as the Entertainment Software Association (ESA), and the creation of the voluntary Entertainment Software Ratings Board (ESRB) ratings system, a system that met the governmental concerns of the time. The ESRB focused mostly on console games at its founding. Computer video game software used the Recreational Software Advisory Council (RSAC) through 1999, but transitioned to use ESRB in 1999 while the RSAC became more focused on rating online content from the Internet.

Since 1993, several incidents of gun violence in the United States, such as the Columbine School shooting of 1999, put more blame on video games for inciting these crimes, thought there is no conclusive proof that violent video games lead to violent behavior. Under demands of parents and concerned citizens, federal and state governments have attempted to pass legislation that would enforce the ESRB rating systems for retail that would pose fines to retailers that sold mature-rated games to minors. This came to a head in the Supreme Court of the United States case Brown v. Entertainment Merchants Association, which concluded in 2010 that video games were considered a form of protected speech, and regulation of their sales could only be mandated if the material passed the Miller test for obscene material.

The ESRB remains a voluntary system for rating video games in the United States, though nearly all major retail outlets will refuse to sell unrated games and will typically avoid selling those listed as "AO" for adults only. Retailers are voluntarily bound by the age ratings, though the Federal Trade Commission, in 2013, found that the ESRB system had the best compliance of preventing sales of mature games to minors compared to the other American entertainment industries. In addition to age ratings, the ESRB rating includes content descriptors (such as "Nudity", "Use of Drugs", and "Blood and Gore") to better describe the type of questionable material that may be in the game. The ESRB not only rates games after reviewing material submitted by the publisher, but also spot-checks games after release to make sure no additional content had been added after review, applying fines and penalties to publishers that do so. Notably, the ESRB was heavily involved over the Hot Coffee mod, a user mod of Grand Theft Auto: San Andreas that unlocked a sex scene that had been on the retail disc but otherwise inaccessible without the mod. Currently 85% of American parents are aware of the ESRB rating system and many are finding parental controls on video game consoles useful.

In the digital storefront space, including digital-only games and downloadable content for retail games, the ESRB does not require ratings though encourages developers and publishers to utilize the self-assessment ratings tools provided by the International Age Rating Coalition to assign their game a rating which can propagate to other national and regional ratings systems, such as the Pan European Game Information (PEGI) system.

Arcade games in the United States are rated separated under a "Parental Advisory System" devised by the American Amusement Machine Association, the Amusement & Music Operators Association, and the International Association for the Leisure and Entertainment Industry, along with guidelines for where more mature games should be located in arcades and other code of conduct principles for arcade operators.

== See also ==
- Best-selling video games in the United States by year
- List of video games markets by country
- 2023–2024 video game industry layoffs
