= Gaming in the United States =

Index of articles associated with the same name

Gaming in the United States could refer to:

- Gambling in the United States
- Video games in the United States
