= Network Inventory Advisor =

Third-party network management tool for Windows

- Developer: ClearApps LLC
- Stable release: Network Inventory Advisor 4.0 / December 15, 2012; 12 years ago
- Operating system: Windows
- License: Proprietary
- Website: www.clearapps.com

Network Inventory Advisor (NIA) is a third-party network management tool for Windows that collects data on network devices in order to generate statistical reports on software and hardware usage. The application was created by ClearApps LLC, a software development company headquartered in Elk Grove, California. The first release of Network Inventory Advisor (under the name of PC Inventory Advisor) is dated March 29, 2008.

== Functionality ==
Network Inventory Advisor is able to collect information about computers on a network, audit installed software and hardware and keep track of the related changes. The program is able to scan Windows, Linux and Mac PCs. Network Inventory Advisor has a report-building wizard for a custom report creation and a pre-defined report templates.

== Critical reception ==
Network Inventory Advisor was reviewed by Windows IT Pro, Techworld, 4Sysops, Softonic, and Techmixer

== Release history ==
Version	Platform	Release date	Notes and significant changes
3.0.	Windows	March 2008	Initial public release of Network Inventory Advisor (formerly PC Inventory Advisor).
3.1.	Windows	June 2008	Macs inventory; New SQL export format; Logon script scanning
3.2.	Windows	November 2008	Licenses compliance audit feature; New tabular reports
3.5	Windows	June 2009	SNMP devices inventory support; User-defined fields; Command-line interface; Customizable alerts; Remote desktop connection
3.6	Windows	August 2009	Batch editing and management of network nodes; Automatic hardware changes tracking and reporting; Enhanced network summary report
3.9	Windows	September 2010	Native scanning of Linux OS support; Software changes report; Data on antiviruses in tabular reports
4.0	Windows	December 2012	Completely reworked user interface; Free 10-nodes plan introduced
