= Calamity Mod =

Terraria mod

Calamity
- Stable release: v2.2.4 / 9 August, 2026
- Engine: Microsoft XNA
- Available in: English
- License: Code & Art: Proprietary with source-available public releases and reusage stipulations Music: Property of original creators, CC BY-NC 3.0
- Website: calamitymod.com
- Repository: GitHub

The Calamity Mod, also known simply as Calamity, is a mod for Terraria, known for its numerous additions to the game such as new items, biomes, enemies and bosses as well as adding many new difficulties to the game. The mod received significant attention for its breadth of content as well as its soundtrack. Development of the mod ceased after allegations of online child abuse were made against the lead developer, resulting in an exodus of the rest of the team.

== Gameplay ==
The Calamity Mod expands Terraria's gameplay and progression by introducing new weapons, materials, and the Rogue class, which specializes in stealth. Numerous bosses are added throughout different stages of progression. They can be encountered by meeting certain conditions or summoned manually, and defeating them grants powerful items, unlocks new areas, and advances the game. Some bosses are available only after Moon Lord, the final boss of Terraria, extending the original progression.

The biomes that Calamity adds house unique enemies and bosses. Certain biomes are largely inaccessible until a specific condition is met, such as the Abyss, which requires special gear to traverse, and the Astral Infection, which only spawns after the Wall of Flesh has been defeated. Existing biomes receive new structures and enemies, as well as new materials that can be used to craft various new items.

Alongside the base Classic, Expert and Master modes, there are additional optional difficulty modifiers named "Revengeance" and "Death" that change enemy and boss AI and add new game mechanics. The mod adds new NPCs as well as quality of life features.

The mod completely changes the lore of Terraria, with its narrative centering around the player growing strong enough to confront the Godseeker Yharim, a central figure in its lore. Players can obtain lore items that provide background information about the world and its characters.

== Development ==
After its initial release in 2016, Calamity has continued receiving updates that add content, tweak balance and make the mod compatible with newer versions of Terraria.

On June 23, 2022, the mod was published on the Steam Workshop page of tModLoader.

In 2025, the lead developer of the mod, Fabsol, was accused of online child abuse, and was replaced as project lead by the developer Ozzatron, who later faced similar allegations the following year, leading to the cancellation of development. Development under Ozzatron occurred under a business entity, Azafure LLC, a company he owned which also held ownership of the mod's IP.

=== Music ===
Calamity Mod features an original soundtrack principally composed by DM Dokuro, with collaborations and later tracks from other indie composers. DM Dokuro's soundtrack received a 37-track album release titled The Tale of a Cruel World on February 19, 2019. On September 25, 2020, the album got a 45-track re-release by the video game music record label Materia Collective. Before cancellation, the mod's soundtrack was being composed by CDMusic, Heart Plus Up!, and others. Heart Plus Up!'s contributions to the soundtrack got a 45-track album titled The Resurrection of a Cruel World in 2024.

=== Cessation of development ===
On August 10, 2026, the developers of the Calamity Mod announced they would be ceasing development. This came in response to accusations against the lead developer Ozzatron made via Reddit alleging online child abuse, including endangerment and grooming. The evidence for the allegations came from a Discord server owned by Ozzatron. A Proton Drive folder containing the evidence was also circulated. Other developers alleged that Ozzatron had "gone AWOL" following the allegations and was not paying out money owed to members of the team. The rest of the team requested patrons to withdraw their donations to the mod, resulting in Patreon donations going from $2,600 to $480 by August 11. They also stated they were working to have ownership of the mod on Steam Workshop transferred to a new owner, but were encountering difficulties due to Ozzatron's control over the mod through Azafure LLC. Outlets drew comparisons to the ousting of the mod's previous lead developer Fabsol, noting that this had been a recurring issue.

The developers stated they did not wish to continue development of the mod as they believed its reputation had become "irrecoverably tainted." Several developers and artists had made requests to have their assets removed from the mod, which would have rendered further development untenable. Streamer xQc made an offer to buy the mod to continue its development, but was rejected. While the mod wouldn't receive any further content updates, it would still be available for download and maintained in its current state to work on future versions of tModLoader.

== Reception ==
Calamity received acclaim, with various sources noting the amount of content the mod adds to Terraria. Prima Games stated that playing the mod is "like experiencing a completely different game." GamesRadar+ described the mod as "arguably the biggest [Terraria] mod that currently exists." Dot Esports stated that the mod provides "weeks of extra fun" and is "challenging, even for Terraria veterans." Game Rant stated that the mod "offers much more than standard Terraria mods," describing it as a "total overhaul." The mod was acknowledged by the creator of Terraria, Andrew "Redigit" Spinks, who made an open offer to hire mod's developers and composers to work on the base Terraria.

The soundtrack for Calamity was also widely praised, with Opera GX ranking it as the ninth best game soundtrack of all time, higher than that of the base Terraria.

At the time the project ceased development, the mod had over 9 million subscribers on Steam Workshop, making it one of the most popular Terraria mods.

=== Legacy ===
The Calamity Mod has inspired various add-on mods — one of the most popular being Calamity Mod Infernum Mode, which adds a brand new difficulty level that primarily reworks boss fights and vastly increases their difficulty.

Several pieces from The Tale of a Cruel World have been performed by live orchestras — including Raw, Unfiltered Calamity, The Leviathan Trilogy, Scourge of the Universe and Roar of the Jungle Dragon.

In 2025, Calamity Fables was published as a standalone, ground-up reimagining of the Calamity Mod, created by some of its former developers. It serves as an alternate vision for the original mod, with a particular focus on high content standards and immersive storytelling.
