= FileHippo =

Software downloading website

- FileHippo Homepage as of July 2019
- Website type: Software directory
- Available in: English, German, Spanish, French, Italian, Polish, Japanese, Chinese
- Owner: Softonic
- Website: filehippo.com
- Commercial: No
- Registration: None
- Launched: 2004; 22 years ago
- Current status: Online

FileHippo is a software downloading website that offers computer software for Windows. The website has sections listing most recently updated programs and most popular downloads, organised by category, with program information and link. Registration is not required in this website, and FileHippo does not accept software submissions from publishers.

== History ==
FileHippo was established in 2004 by the technology company, Well Known Media, of Ramsey, Isle of Man. The site added a news section in 2014. FileHippo was estimated to be worth over US$13,000,000 in November 2015.

Before Softonic acquired the FileHippo.com website, it was funded by user donations and third-party advertising, had an Update Checker, later renamed App Manager, a free program that scanned a computer for outdated software and offered links to more recent versions, later redirecting to IObit Software Updater.

Softonic acquired FileHippo. On 17 June 2020 the FileHippo home page formerly stated "© FileHippo s.r.o." and since 3 July 2020, it states "Softonic International, S.A. holds the license to use the name and logo of Filehippo".
