= Crozdesk =

Crozdesk is a web service launched in 2015, which connects buyers and sellers of business software and offers an algorithm to rate platforms and assign a score. Its founder is Nicholas Hopper, a London-based German entrepreneur.

Hopper revealed Crozdesk attracted a six-figure seeding round from a Swiss investor.

In July 2016, Crozdesk announced a partnership with app and software discovery platform Softonic.
