= Re-Logic =

Independent game developer and publisher

- Type: Private
- Industry: Video games
- Founded: October 29, 2010; 16 years ago
- Founder: Andrew Spinks
- Headquarters: Floyds Knobs, Indiana
- Key people: Andrew Spinks (president)
- Products: Terraria; Pixel Piracy; Pixel Privateers
- Number of employees: 11 (2025)
- Website: re-logic.com

Re-Logic is an American independent video game developer and publisher based in Floyds Knobs, Indiana. Founded by Andrew "Redigit" Spinks in 2011, the company is best known for developing and publishing the 2D action-adventure sandbox video game Terraria. Re-Logic also published Pixel Piracy and Pixel Privateers, both developed by Quadro Delta, in 2014 and 2017, respectively. Between 2015 and 2018, Re-Logic also worked on a Terraria spinoff titled Terraria: Otherworld; the game was canceled because Re-Logic was not satisfied with its development progress. Re-Logic voiced its opposition to its titles becoming Epic Games Store exclusive in 2019 and to the royalty fee that was announced by the Unity game engine in 2023.

== History ==
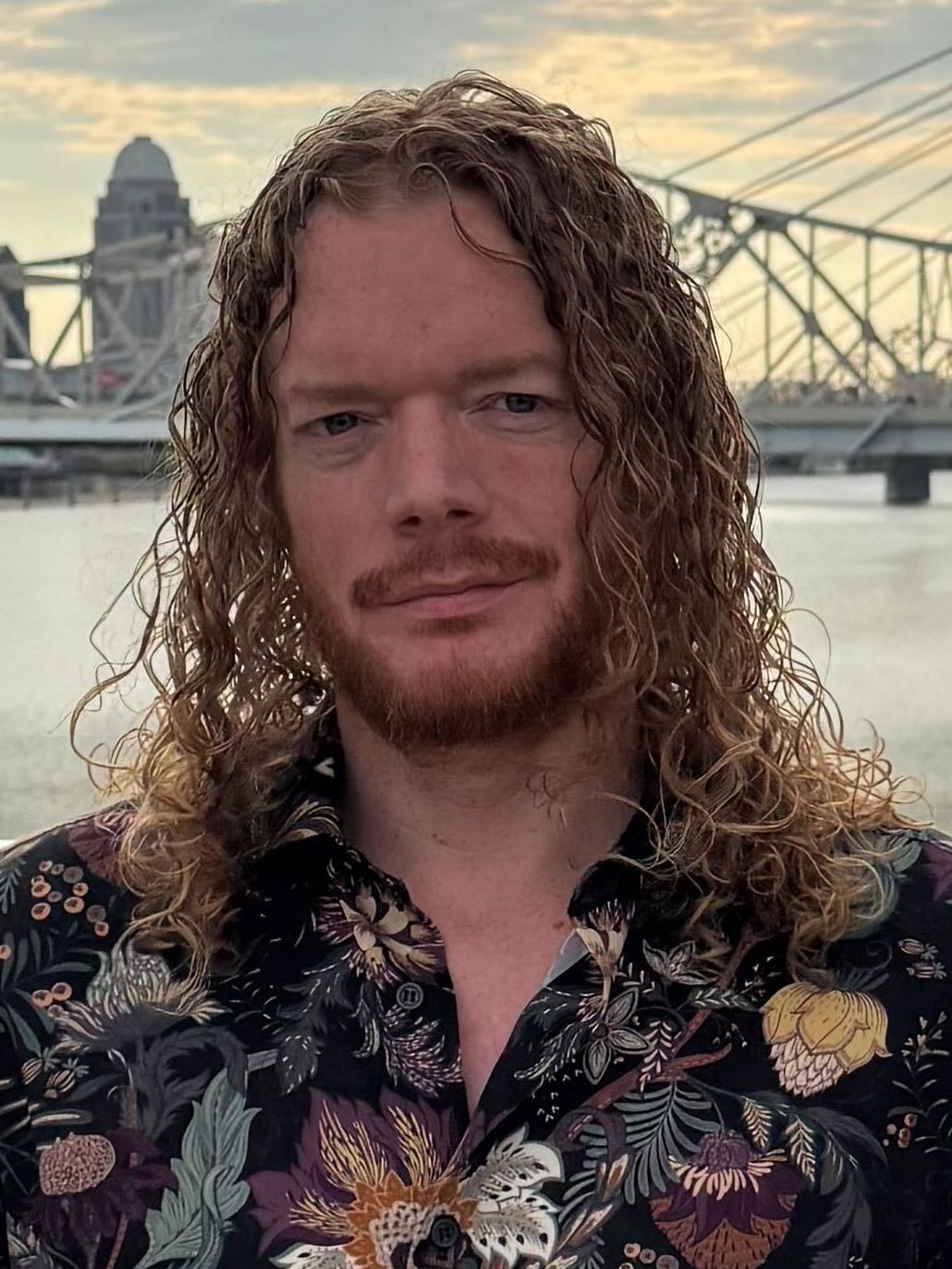
Founder Andrew Spinks in 2025

Based in Floyds Knobs, Indiana, Re-Logic was founded during the early development cycle of Terraria, which began development in January 2011 by Andrew Spinks. With the help of a team of game testers, he built the game using the Microsoft XNA framework. Re-Logic released Terraria on May 16, 2011; the game was released earlier than planned, as a beta version was leaked to the public. The developer continued to supply the game with content updates, although in February 2012, Spinks announced that Terraria's development would not continue further. However, in 2013, development resumed, with the second major update being released in October 2013. In the same month of the release, Spinks hinted at creating a sequel, Terraria 2.

Beginning in September 2012, Re-Logic worked with Engine Software and 505 Games on porting Terraria to Xbox 360 and PlayStation 3. The game was later ported to PlayStation Vita by 505 Games, and to mobile devices by Codeglue. In 2014, Terraria was released for PlayStation 4 and Xbox One. The Nintendo 3DS version was released in 2015, followed by the Wii U version in 2016.

Re-Logic became involved with the development of Pixel Piracy in 2014, a game developed by Quadro Delta. It was released on the Steam digital distribution service on July 31, 2014. Re-Logic ended up publishing the game. In February 2016, the game was released for PlayStation 4 and Xbox One. Beginning in 2016, Re-Logic worked with Quadro Delta on another game called Pixel Privateers. Released in 2017, it was compared to Borderlands and Diablo.

In February 2015, Re-Logic began working on a spinoff of Terraria titled Terraria: Otherworld. The game included strategy and role-playing elements, such as tower defense gameplay. Re-Logic worked with Engine Software on the game until April 2017, when the latter was replaced by Pipeworks Studios. A year later, however, Re-Logic announced that Otherworld had been canceled due to it not being satisfied with its development.

In response to an increasing number of games becoming exclusive to the Epic Games Store, Re-Logic's then vice-president Whitney Spinks said that no Re-Logic titles would ever become Epic Games Store exclusives, stating that the company would never "sell [its] souls" for any amount of money. In February 2021, Spinks and Re-Logic had a public falling out with Google over the suspension of Re-Logic's Google account without a given reason. As a result, Re-Logic canceled the Google Stadia version of Terraria. Later that February, Google reached out to Re-Logic about the account shutdown, provided transparency around the situation and restored its accounts; subsequently, Re-Logic reaffirmed that it would release the game for Stadia, which it did on March 18, 2021.

In September 2023, Unity Engine announced a royalty policy called the Unity Runtime Fee, which imposed charges per installation once a product met specific revenue and lifetime installation thresholds. This change was negatively received by the video game developer community. Although Re-Logic does not use the engine, it condemned the policy and announced donations of $100,000 to the open-source Godot and FNA engines, and a $1,000 monthly donation from that point onward.

== Games ==
=== Developed ===
- Terraria (2011)

=== Published ===
- Pixel Piracy (2014)
- Pixel Privateers (2017)

=== Canceled ===
- Terraria: Otherworld
