= Dizzywood =

2007 video game

- Developer: Rocket Paper Scissors, LLC
- Publishers: Rocket Paper Scissors, LLC
- Engine: Adobe Flash
- Platform: Online
- Release: November 2007
- Genre: Online Game
- Mode: Multiplayer

Dizzywood was an online game and virtual world developed in San Francisco, California by the entertainment company Rocket Paper Scissors, LLC. It is designed for children between the ages of 8 and 14 years old and has a focus on teamwork, cooperation and collaborative play. The company received funding from well-known investors including Shelby Bonnie (co-founder and former CEO of CNET Networks) and Charles River Ventures. Dizzywood was launched into public beta in November, 2007 and has grown rapidly, reaching over 400,000 monthly global visitors. Most visitors come from the United States and other English-speaking countries. The game is a visual chat and social game application similar to Club Penguin or Habbo Hotel, with adventure and quest components similar to RuneScape and other MMO games. It was free to play until the introduction of bonuses and extras that required paying to be a "Gold" or "Silver Explorer". The game officially closed December 31, 2010.

== The Avatars ==
Players can select and customize an avatar upon registration and are immediately placed in-world. The avatars appear as stylized cartoon depictions of human children while many of the non-player characters in Dizzywood appear as anthropomorphic animals. The exploration theme of Dizzywood is immediately apparent as new avatars are equipped with hiking clothes and a backpack. A distinguishing feature of Dizzywood is that players can completely alter their appearance at any time using a feature called Change Your Look.

Players can communicate via online chat or visually through the use of emotes (happy, angry, etc.) that can be sent to other players. Players can also write a message below your name after you become a paying member. Gold Explorers can do many things such as "gold only" missions. They also get to buy certain clothes and get a mansion with 6 rooms (8 including the main room and the grounds) to decorate any way they choose.

== Environment ==
Dizzywood's environment ranged from forest to jungle to beaches. There was even a town in the sky and an underground hideout. Each place had a host that updated players on the latest things happening around town.

== Activities and Events ==
There are many activities and events in Dizzywood. Most activity takes place in the form of mini-games and group events such as growing a plant or tree or finding a treasure in a rock pile. The site also produces several daily events, called Dizzy Activities, that follow short story-arcs and typically unfold over a four-day period each week. Most of the story-driven activities involve players attempting to defeat the game's arch-villain, Emperor Withering. For example, a recent story-line encouraged players to clean up pollution and fix broken machines that were destroyed by Withering's henchmen. From finishing a mission you can receive a special item, coins, or it can unlock other related missions.

== Closing ==
Dizzywood was said to close on December 31, 2010, but it remained in the US until January 12, 2011.

== App ==
On September 20, 2012, Dizzywood posted an app at the iTunes store. This app was later updated on October 10, 2012 with new levels. This app is a game in the style of Dizzwood, where the player moves around the 'diamonds' to get three or over in a row. If you get a certain kind and number of one of the coloured diamonds, you earn enough points to destroy the swamp creatures. The objective of this game is to 'save the swamp' and there are many levels to do so. This was designed by the creators of Dizzywood, Rocket Paper Scissors. This has been thought to be the new update Dizzywood wrote about in their last blog article, however this is speculation, as there has been no official word on the matter yet.
