= DonationCoder.com =

DonationCoder
- Available in: English
- Owner: Jesse Reichler
- Creator: Jesse Reichler
- Revenue: Private Donations
- Website: www.donationcoder.com
- Commercial: no
- Registration: None to browse, Required to post
- Launched: March 2005
- Current status: Active

DonationCoder.com is a website hosting a community of programmers and software fans. It supports a donation-based model to organize and finance software development, and is one example of Donationware.

The community develops and finances its own free software, software reviews, podcasts, and a diverse programming school. Funding is accomplished using a grant-like system of micro-donations. All donors to the site receive their donation back as DonationCredits which they can then trade amongst themselves to support different projects and reward activities contributing to the community. All members are considered equal and simply donate an amount they feel comfortable with.

The community also fosters collaboration on free services, programming contests, and academic projects.

Most of the software developed and discussed on the site are for Microsoft Windows, even though the developments in other platforms are followed.

== See also ==
- Gift economy
- Participatory organization
- Donationware
