= Softonic =

Spanish software hosting website founded in 1997

- Website type: Software hosting service
- Owner: Softonic Internacional S.A.
- Creator: Tomás Diago Esteve
- CEO: Fiona Garvey
- Revenue: €32.4 million (2025)
- Employees: 87 (2025)
- Subsidiaries: FileHippo; Appvizer
- Website: en.softonic.com
- Commercial: Yes
- Launched: 1997; 29 years ago
- Current status: Online

Softonic is a Spanish software download platform that distributes, categorizes, and evaluates programs for Windows, Android, and Mac, and is available in 18 languages. The platform was founded in Barcelona, Catalonia, Spain, in June 1997. The company is headquartered in Barcelona and led by CEO Fiona Garvey.

In the past, Softonic was accused of questionable business practices and spreading malware, including through its "Softonic Downloader". Softonic has stated that it applies a "multi-layer security system" to all files in its catalog, scanning each one with multiple antivirus engines prior to publication.

== History ==
Softonic started in 1997 as a file-oriented download service called Shareware Intercom, at Intercom Online (Grupo Intercom), a provider of Internet services in Cerdanyola del Vallès, near Barcelona (Catalonia, Spain). Files came from the "Files Library Intercom BBS" at Intercom Online, using a "5-step semi-automated process". The company also offered monthly CDs of its software library. In 1999, the service was described by El Tiempo as having a "generosity of games, antiviruses, education and the long, seductive et cetera". In 2000, the company became independent under the name Softonic.

In 2004, Softonic was made available in German, and in 2005, English. Initially, the service was for downloads of MS-DOS and Windows software. Mac and mobile platforms were later added.

In 2013, Partners Group acquired 30% of the shares, paying more than 82 million euros. At the end of 2014, Softonic announced that a headcount reduction procedure would be carried out as a cost-cutting measure, allegedly due to financial and organizational reasons. In December, the company formalized the dismissal of 156 employees.

In February 2015, Scott Arpajian, co-founder of Download.com, became the CEO, succeeding founder Tomás Diago.

Softonic's "Softonic Downloader" was described by their CEO Scott Arpajian as having "facilitated bad behaviour amongst third party vendors which ended up harming the user", with malicious links impersonating the downloader itself. He said that the Downloader "grew revenue but was under the microscope as far as the industry was concerned". In February 2015, Softonic permanently discontinued the Softonic Downloader and transitioned to a direct-download-only model, with the aim of improving transparency and rebuilding trust of users and advertisers, in particular Google, who withdrew its advertising from the site in 2014. Arpajian said that shutting down the Softonic Downloader was one of the first things he had done when he took over the company in February 2015, and that his intention was to regain the trust of the site's users.

In July 2016, Softonic announced a partnership with business software platform Crozdesk.

In May 2017, the company announced that it had hired international executive Sophie Bernard as Vice President of Strategy.

In October 2019, Softonic acquired Ghacks. The site's founder and editor, Martin Brinkmann, along with the writing team, retained editorial control over the content. Softonic assumed responsibility for administrative tasks, including domain management, hosting, advertisements, and partner communications.

In 2020, Softonic launched Revamp, a technology to increase publishers' advertising revenue.

In 2021, Fiona Garvey was appointed as CEO.

In 2022, the company grew 34%, amounting to over €26 million.

In 2024, Softonic acquired Appvizer, a business-to-business software recommendation platform. Appvizer is known for its recommendation algorithms and clients like Factorial, Monday.com, and Salesforce.

In 2025, Softonic launched its "Security and Trust Center", a new section providing users with security reports for each software listing in its catalogue, expanding the company's existing file-scanning system.

In 2025, Softonic launched the "Publishing Center", a self-service platform intended to allow software developers and publishers to manage their listings in the Softonic directory, submit new versions for editorial review, and access download and usage analytics.

In February 2026, Softonic reported revenues of €32.4 million for fiscal year 2025, a 14.1% year-on-year increase. The same month, investor Michael Levitt increased his stake from a minority position to 60% of total shares, becoming the company's majority shareholder. The remaining shares are held by several minority partners.

== Overview ==
=== Products ===
The company has several main products:

- Softonic.com: A software distribution platform that provides options and guidance for various software needs.
- Appvizer: A platform that recommends B2B software.

=== White labels ===
Softonic collaborates with other platforms to manage their ecosystems:

- FileHippo: A computer software for Windows downloading website
- Download.com: Software download platform owned by CNET and launched in 1996.

== Global reach and traffic ==
Softonic operates internationally, with its platform available in 18 languages. According to the company's Global Download & Trends Report 2025, produced with consultancy firm Forvis Mazars, the platform recorded over 1.5 billion visits in 2025, with an average of 127.7 million monthly sessions. By region, Asia accounted for 51.25% of traffic and the Americas for 22.25%. In Spain, the company's domestic market, Softonic registered more than 24 million sessions during the same year.
