= Terraria =

2011 video game

- Developer: Re-Logic (Note: Ported to mobile and console platforms by DR Studios. The mobile version was formerly developed by Codeglue. The console version was formerly developed by Pipeworks Studios and Engine Software.)
- Publisher: Re-Logic (Note: The PC versions are self-published by Re-Logic; a retail Windows version was published by Headup Games in Europe. Console versions published by 505 Games. Japanese version published by Spike Chunsoft.)
- Producer: Whitney Spinks
- Designers: Andrew "Redigit" Spinks; Whitney Spinks; Yorai Omer
- Programmers: Yorai Omer; Andrew "Redigit" Spinks; Chris Bednarz
- Artists: Victor Moura; James Hayes; Jim Kjexrud
- Composer: Scott Lloyd Shelly
- Platforms: Windows: PlayStation 3; Xbox 360; iOS; Android; PlayStation Vita; Windows Phone; PlayStation 4; Xbox One; macOS; Linux; Nintendo 3DS; Wii U; Nintendo Switch; Google Stadia
- Release: May 16, 2011: Windows; WW: May 16, 2011; PlayStation 3; NA: March 26, 2013; PAL: May 15, 2013; Xbox 360; WW: March 27, 2013; iOS; WW: August 29, 2013; Android; WW: September 13, 2013; PlayStation Vita; PAL: December 11, 2013; NA: December 17, 2013; Windows Phone; WW: September 12, 2014; PlayStation 4; WW: November 11, 2014; Xbox One; WW: November 14, 2014; macOS, Linux; WW: August 12, 2015; Nintendo 3DS; WW: December 10, 2015; Wii U; PAL: June 24, 2016; NA: June 28, 2016; Nintendo Switch; WW: June 27, 2019; Google Stadia; WW: March 18, 2021
- Genres: Action-adventure, sandbox
- Modes: Single-player, multiplayer

Terraria (/təˈrɛəriə/ tə-RAIR-ee-ə) is a 2011 action-adventure video game developed and published by Re-Logic. As a sandbox game, Terraria has no set goals. After creating the player character and choosing the game's difficulty, the player is placed in a two-dimensional, procedurally generated world where they explore, fight enemies, gather resources, and craft equipment. Players beat bosses, a tougher variety of enemies, to gain access to more items, resources, and equipment. By completing select goals, players receive access to non-player characters (NPCs) who sell items and offer services, such as healing and fishing quests. Terraria can be played alone or with others, and features support for modding.

Andrew Spinks commenced development in January 2011; he was assisted by a team of game testers and designers. As of 2025, Terraria is developed by eleven members of Re-Logic. Initially released in May 2011 on the Steam digital store, Terraria has received continuous content updates that have considerably changed it from its first version. The game was originally set to end development in 2012, but it resumed in 2013.

Terraria has since seen the addition of new items, NPCs, enemies, and world difficulties, as well as quality-of-life improvements and crossovers with different games. It has also been ported to other platforms, including home video game consoles, handheld consoles, mobile phones, and operating systems. Despite announcing in 2020 that the game's fourth major update would be its last, Re-Logic has continued developing Terraria.

Terraria has received generally favorable reviews from critics. Gameplay aspects such as exploration, replayability, and amount of content have been praised, and the crafting has been viewed as complex. The lack of a tutorial for PC has been criticized, but the tutorial worlds of Xbox 360, PlayStation 3, and PS Vita were commended. The combat system, as well as the controls for Xbox 360 and PlayStation 3, and the pixelated sprites, were also positively received. As of 2026, Terraria has sold over 70 million copies, making it one of the best-selling video games of all time. Re-Logic developed Terraria: Otherworld from 2015 until it was canceled in 2018.

== Gameplay ==
A screenshot of a procedurally generated Terraria world

Terraria is a sandbox, action-adventure, role-playing, and platformer video game. It offers gameplay that revolves around exploration, building, crafting, combat, survival, and mining, without having any set goals. It is playable in both single-player and multiplayer modes. The game's two-dimensional graphical style is reminiscent of the 16-bit sprites found on the Super Nintendo Entertainment System game console. Terraria is noted for its classic exploration-adventure style of gameplay, similar to games such as Minecraft.

When creating a procedurally generated world, the player is able to choose the size of the world from three options. Players start in a world with basic tools and a non-player character (NPC) guide that introduces aspects of the game and provides information on other NPCs and item recipes. Scholar Ji Soo Lim said in his study that the participants had to rely on a wiki to learn more about the game.

The world is divided into biomes, with each having unique enemies and resources. Evil biomes, such as Corruption and Crimson, are populated with tougher enemies and can spread and infect other biomes. A vast array of resources, such as ores, can be found while exploring caves. Some resources may only be found in specific areas of the world, stored in containers or dropped by enemies. Players can use found resources to craft equipment and items, such as weapons, armor, and potions, at crafting stations. The player can also fish, golf, and decorate their homes. Players also begin with low health and mana, which can be increased by finding and crafting specific equipment or items. Terraria has several difficulty modes: the "Classic" mode, and "Expert" and "Master" modes, both of which increase the difficulty in exchange for exclusive items. There is also the "Journey" mode, which allows the player to duplicate items, adjust the world's difficulty, and control weather and time while playing.

The game features a character class system, primarily divided into melee, ranged, magic, and summoner classes. The equipment a player uses defines their class (e.g., melee players use close-range weapons, ranged players use bows and guns), therefore a player's class can change throughout the game if a player changes their equipment. Players can encounter a variety of enemies who appear depending on factors such as time, location, and special events. A more difficult version of enemies, called bosses, attack the player differently than regular enemies and can drop valuable items. They can be summoned either by players using special items or when certain criteria are met.

The defeat of some bosses is directly tied to in-game progression, such as the Wall of Flesh, who advances the game into "hardmode", a stage that introduces tougher enemies, as well as new NPCs, resources, and items. Like bosses, players can also battle enemies and mini-bosses during special events they trigger, such as goblins, pirates, or aliens, in which enemies appear constantly, and they must either be defeated or a certain amount of time must pass before the event ends. There are also seasonal special events, such as a Halloween-themed one, which introduces special paintings, gear, and goodie bags.

By completing specific goals, such as defeating a boss or obtaining a certain item, players can attract NPCs, such as a merchant, nurse, or demolitionist, to occupy houses they have built. Some NPCs can also be acquired by finding them throughout the world. After acquiring NPCs, players may buy or sell items from them or obtain services from them (e.g., a nurse heals a player; an angler offers fishing-related rewards). The happiness status of NPCs is controlled by two factors: the biome they reside in, and the NPCs they are neighbors with. Depending on their happiness, NPCs will lower their prices and sell special items.

Players also have the option to customize their character's appearance when creating a new character, and in-game through equipping various items. Along with this, players can obtain vanity items, which are armor pieces and accessories with only a cosmetic effect, and dyes, which change the color of equipped accessory and armor items. Players can obtain accessories that provide boosts to the player's statistics, such as wings that enable the player to fly or a shield that provides knockback immunity.

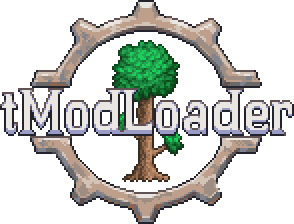
The logo of the tModLoader modification of Terraria

Terraria has support for modifications, which is facilitated by the third-party tModLoader, an open source modification of Terraria that allows players to use other custom-made modifications. It received official support when it was released as a free downloadable content (DLC) on the Steam digital distribution service in 2020. Mods for Terraria vary widely in their scope, content, and purpose. Some, such as Thorium and Calamity, add new content, including bosses, weapons, and biomes. Others, such as Terraria Overhaul, add new game and combat mechanics, including seasons, fire spread, and modify the player's movement. Additions, such as Recipe Browser, Veinminer, Magic Storage, and Fargo's Mutant Mod, aim to improve quality of life by streamlining parts of the game. The Terraria community has also developed "modpacks", a type of a modification that bundles several different mods together, such as The Bereft Souls.

== Development ==
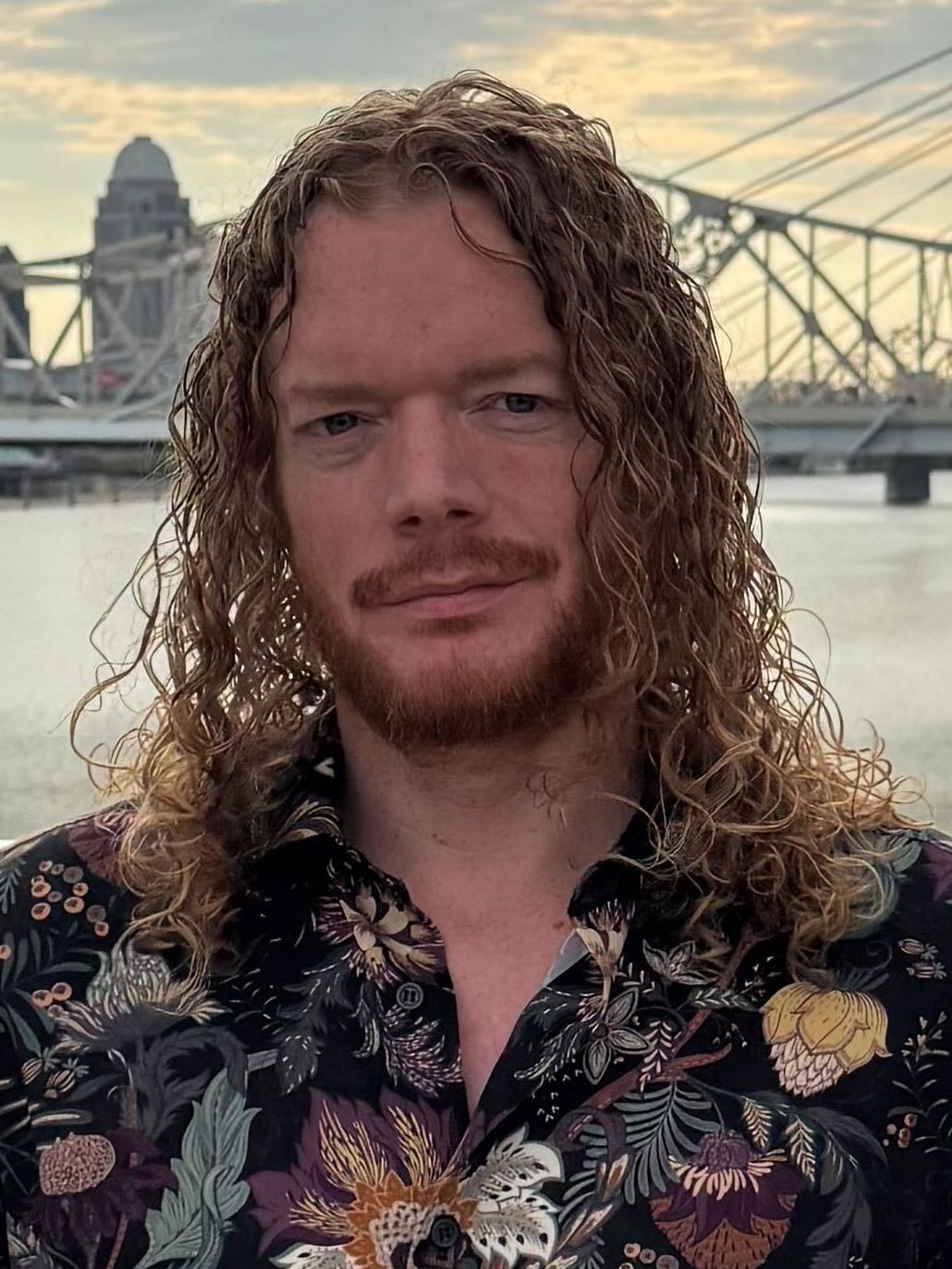
Andrew Spinks (pictured in 2025), the creator of Terraria

Terraria was developed by the independent video game studio Re-Logic and published by 505 Games. Andrew Spinks started developing Terraria in 2011 with support from a team of game testers and designers, including some volunteers. Spinks previously worked as a developer on a Super Mario fan game titled Super Mario Bros X. He built Terraria on the Microsoft XNA framework. (Note: IndieWire's Tyler Hersko describes XNA as "an archaic tool" abandoned by Microsoft in 2013.) Spinks worked out of his living room, the small team collaborating remotely. Scott Lloyd Shelly composed the music. The game received attention early in development following a tweet from Minecraft creator Markus Persson.

Spinks announced that Terraria would not have further content updates in February 2012, so that he could focus on his family; the company instead released a final bug-fix patch. Some fans were unhappy with the announcement. Development resumed in 2013, with Spinks soliciting ideas from the community for future content updates; the developer frequently engages with fans using official forums and social media. (Note: The game's head of business strategy, Ted "Loki" Murphy, said Re-Logic had engaged in "fun banter and speculation" with players since launch.)

The game's success enabled Spinks to hire a team. As of 2025, Re-Logic comprises eleven people, with most of their staff having been hired from the community.

== Release ==
Terraria was released on Steam for Windows on May 16, 2011. This was earlier than planned, since a beta version from a closed playtest had been leaked to the public. A collector's edition of Terraria was released on March 16, 2012. On August 12, 2015, macOS and Linux versions were released.

In September 2012, Spinks announced that Engine Software and 505 Games would port (convert the game to a different platform) Terraria to Xbox 360 and PlayStation 3. The game was released for Xbox 360 on the Xbox Live Arcade on March 27, 2013; the PlayStation 3 version had been released on the PlayStation Network in North America on March 26, 2013, and in Europe and Australia on May 15. The console versions introduced a local cooperative multiplayer mode. A downloadable version of Terraria was released for PlayStation 4 on November 11, 2014, and for Xbox One three days later; Its retail release was on December 2, 2014. The console version of 1.3, developed by Pipeworks Studios, was released in February 2018; its mobile version was released in August 2019.

Shortly after the initial console releases, 505 Games announced Terraria's release for PlayStation Vita; it was released in Europe on December 11, 2013, and in North America on December 17 the same year. The Vita version included a tutorial world and an online Wi-Fi multiplayer mode.

Spike Chunsoft localized the PlayStation 3 and Vita versions for the release in Japan, including a costume based on Monokuma of the company's Danganronpa series. Spike Chunsoft promoted Terraria with broadcasts and by sharing video footage of the game on Niconico. According to the company, most players who downloaded a demo version of Terraria for PlayStation 3 bought the full game. The Nintendo 3DS version was first released on the Nintendo eShop on December 10, 2015; a Wii U version was released on the eShop in Europe on June 24, 2016, and in North America four days later. A Nintendo Switch version was released on June 27, 2019.

505 Games announced a mobile version of Terraria in May 2013, ported by the Dutch studio Codeglue for Android, iOS, and Windows Phone. The studio optimized it for touch screens and integrated the game with Facebook. Terraria was released for iOS on August 29, 2013, for Android on September 13, and for Windows Phone on September 12, 2014. The console and mobile versions received the 1.2 update in 2014.

In February 2021, Spinks announced the cancellation of Terraria's Google Stadia version due to the unexplained suspension of Re-Logic's Google account, which had been ongoing for over three weeks. He later clarified that existing Android and Google Play versions would not be affected. Google restored the company's accounts later that month, and Re-Logic released Terraria for Stadia on March 18. Google announced the shutdown of Stadia in September 2022, and the platform was terminated the following January.

=== Post-release updates ===
Terraria has received many updates since the official release. These updates were released for free, Spinks describing it as "the right thing to do". Terraria is an outlier among the wider industry by not incorporating microtransactions to raise revenue. These updates have contributed to the game's longevity.

One of Terraria's first updates, 1.0.5, was released in June 2011, and it introduced potions. Its first major update, 1.1, was released on December 1, 2011. The update added enemies and bosses, including the Wall of Flesh, items, accessories, and improved the game's lighting system and world generation. With the update, new NPCs, such as the wizard, mechanic, and goblin tinkerer were also introduced, and weapons and accessories got bonus effects. In a Christmas update to 1.1, Re-Logic added snowmen enemies and a Santa Claus NPC.

The game's second major update, 1.2, was released in October 2013. The update had new mechanics, gameplay changes and graphics adjustments, adding new items, NPCs, bosses, and enemies. Re-Logic continued releasing minor content updates, introducing a Halloween-themed special event and a Christmas-themed seasonal event. The 1.2.3 update, released in February 2014 introduced new items, improved game mechanics, and introduced the stylist and traveling merchant NPCs.

Re-Logic released the third major update, 1.3, on June 30, 2015. The update introduced new biomes, events, NPCs, items, enemies and an "expert" difficulty mode, and improved sound effects and graphics; it also introduced the ability to invite Steam players in multiplayer mode. The update also introduced the "Moon Lord", the last boss to be defeated in the game. In September 2016, Re-Logic added sandstorms and expanded the desert biome. In November 2016, Re-Logic also introduced crossover content from Dungeon Defenders 2.

The fourth major update, 1.4 (or Journey's End), was released by Re-Logic on May 16, 2020. With the update, tModLoader received official support from Re-Logic after its addition to Steam as free downloadable content. The 1.4 update introduced new items, enemies, biomes and gameplay elements, including "master" and "journey" difficulty modes. The update became available on Switch in January 2022. Despite announcing that the 1.4 update would be the final update for the game, Re-Logic has continued developing it. Spinks said that "there is so much demand it makes it hard to move on".

Since then, the "final update" announcement has become a meme in the Terraria community. A March 2021 update added direct support for resource packs, worlds, and character sharing through the Steam Workshop. In November 2021, a crossover update added content from the survival game Don't Starve Together (which received Terraria-themed content in return). The 1.4.4 "Labor of Love" update, released on September 28, 2022, added several quality-of-life features to the game. Palworld announced a collaboration with Terraria in November 2024.

On the April Fools' Day of 2024, an early version of Terraria became available on Steam in a separate branch titled Terraria Undeluxe Edition, with another branch coming in May that contained the 1.1 update, dubbed the "First Final Update". Announced in late 2022, the 1.4.5 update was released on January 27, 2026, featuring crossover content from Palworld and Dead Cells. On May 17, 2026, Re-Logic confirmed the upcoming 1.4.6 update and stated that development will continue beyond the update, dropping the previous notions of a "final update".

== Reception ==
Reception

Aggregate score
Aggregator	Score
Metacritic	(PC) 83/100 (PS3) 81/100 (PS4) 83/100 (Xbox 360) 81/100 (Xbox One) 84/100 (PS Vita) 85/100 (Nintendo 3DS) 71/100 (Nintendo Switch) 82/100 (iOS) 82/100

Review scores
Publication	Score
Eurogamer	(PC) 8/10 (Xbox 360/PS3) 9/10
Famitsu	(PS3) 8, 7, 7, 6 (PS4) 8, 7, 7, 7
Game Informer	8/10
GameRevolution	8/10
GameSpot	(PC) 8/10 (Xbox 360/PS3) 8/10 (PS Vita) 9/10
GamesRadar+	3.5/5
IGN	(PC) 9/10 (Xbox 360/PS3) 9/10 (PS Vita) 9.2/10
Nintendo Life	(Nintendo 3DS) 7/10 (Nintendo Switch) 7/10 (Wii U) 8/10
PC Gamer (US)	79/100 (2011); 83/100 (2018)
Pocket Gamer	3.5/5
TouchArcade	5/5

Terraria received "generally favorable" reviews, according to the review aggregator website Metacritic. Gamasutra listed it as one of the best indie games of 2011. It had over a million reviews on Steam in 2022, maintaining its status as an "overwhelmingly positive" game. Terraria was nominated as the "best independently published game" for The Daily Telegraph video game awards in 2011. Famitsu reviewers commended the game's versions for PlayStation 3 and PlayStation 4.

Reviewers have praised Terraria's gameplay. Its exploration has been positively received, and Nathan Meunier of IGN said that "the drive to explore every nook and cranny of the landscape kicks in right away". Writing for GameSpot, Britton Peele also praised its large world, and Tom Mc Shea commended its boss battles. Kevin Schaller of GameRevolution praised the smooth transition between day and night.

Terraria's replayability was praised by Jeffrey deMelo of TouchArcade and Ben Reeves of Game Informer; Christian Donlan saw the game as "an extremely enjoyable one" for Eurogamer, praising its inclusion of an in-game map. Its large amount of content has been praised by Mc Shea and Peele. Meunier and Mc Shea enjoyed the game's crafting options, but Phill Cameron of Eurogamer disliked its intricacy.

Critics criticized the lack of a tutorial in PC, while the separate tutorial world in Xbox 360 and PlayStation 3 releases was appreciated. Meunier also praised the PS Vita's tutorial. Reeves, however, said that the game does not explain its mechanics well and that he found it to be "tiring and frustrating". Winkie liked its progression system, and Meunier praised the game's NPC village development. Meunier and Philip Kollar of Polygon enjoyed the multiplayer mode, and Peele praised the Xbox 360 and PlayStation 3's multiplayer invitation system.

Marcel van Duyn of Nintendo Life disliked its lack of online multiplayer at the launch of the 3DS version, and saw the Wii U version as an improvement in multiplayer mode. Reviewers have compared the game to Minecraft due to having similar gameplay aspects; Peele called the comparison "somewhat unfair", and Donlan saw Terraria as a mix of gameplay elements from Minecraft and Spelunky. Kollar wrote that although in some parts of the game Terraria is not flexible, it "has more structure, more goals", while Matt Kamen of The Guardian said that Terraria puts more emphasis on combat than Minecraft. Responding to the claims, Spinks said that "people need to understand that Minecraft isn't a game anymore, it's a genre".

The game's technical elements (including its combat system) have been praised. Mc Shea commended the PS Vita's movement controls, and Van Duyn enjoyed its 3DS touchscreen abilities. Critics also liked the controls of the Xbox 360 and PlayStation 3 versions, but Mitch Vogel of Nintendo Life criticized the controls of the Nintendo Switch version. Mark Brown of Pocket Gamer enjoyed the iOS version's mining mechanics, but criticized its movement. Meunier criticized the user interface of the Xbox 360 and PlayStation 3 versions, praising that of the PS Vita. Reviewers liked its retro-styled graphics. Terraria has become a "global [success]" in the pixel art genre of video games.

=== Reassessment ===
Since its release in 2011, PC Gamer has reviewed the game again, shifting its review score from 79 to 83. They noted that although PC Gamer does not re-review games, they have done it for Terraria and other games, such as League of Legends, due to being considerably different than it was in its initial state. In the 2018 review, Luke Winkie disliked the game's intricacy, but praised its technical elements and physics engine.

GameStar also reviewed Terraria in 2020, giving it a score 85 out of 100. Sascha Penzhorn praised the fourth major update, describing the game as "both more accessible and more challenging than even before". (Note: German: sowohl zugänglicher als auch fordernder als je zuvor) He also commended the game's retro graphics and abilities to have pets and customize a player character's clothes with color dyes, but noted that the German translation still included English-language text.

Since tModLoader received official support from Re-Logic in 2020, modding has become an important part of the Terraria fan base. IndieWire wrote that modifications have "added hundreds of hours of new content" and that they effectively serve as "free advertising for Re-Logic and Terraria". In 2022, Re-Logic hired a Minecraft modder to work on tModLoader. When the Opera GX browser ranked the 100 best video game soundtracks of all time in 2024, the soundtrack of the Calamity mod was ranked ninth; Terraria's soundtrack was not included in the list. Spinks congratulated the developers of the Calamity mod and added "how's a mod for my game gonna beat out my game".

=== Sales ===
Terraria sold over 50,000 copies on its first day, and 432,000 in its first month after release. The game sold over 70 million copies by May 2026, making it one of the best-selling video games of all time.

== Legacy ==
=== Potential sequel ===
Terraria 2 was announced in October 2013, but has not been released and, as of a 2022 update, was only one option the studio was considering. In a 2013 interview with Rock Paper Shotgun, Spinks said that the game would be significantly different from the original, saying that it would have "infinite worlds" instead of one world. Later, in 2022, Spinks published concept art for Terraria 2 that was created in its early development. When asked about Terraria 2 upon one team member changing the location in their Twitter bio to "Terraria 2 – A New Age", the studio said it was considering options for future games, but had not yet made a decision.

=== Terraria: Otherworld ===
In February 2015, a separate game, titled Terraria: Otherworld, was announced by Re-Logic as an offshoot of Terraria. The game tasked the player with trying to purify the world of the Corruption, which was to be achieved mainly by finding and activating "purifying towers" that push back the spread of the Corruption. Otherworld would have included more strategy and role-playing elements, such as a tower defense gameplay element, skill trees, and a plot. In an interview with Famitsu, Ruud van de Moosdijk, the head of development of Terraria: Otherworld said that unlike Terraria, Otherworld would have a story.

In July 2016, Re-Logic's partner on the project, Engine Software, hired a new designer and head of art. In April 2017, Re-Logic announced that their previous partner on the project, Engine Software, would be dropped in favor of Pipeworks due to the game being behind schedule. A year later, Re-Logic announced that Otherworld had been canceled due to them not being satisfied with its development.

=== Other media ===
Since its release, Re-Logic has released physical merchandise of the game, such as books, toys, and clothes. In July 2022, Re-Logic announced the release of a Terraria graphic novel in a collaboration with 50 Amp Productions. A year later, Re-Logic announced cooperation with Paper Fort Games on creating a Terraria board game. To fund the game, they launched a Kickstarter campaign.
