= Fightback (video game) =

2013 video game

- App icon
- Developer: Ninja Theory
- Publisher: Chillingo
- Engine: Unity
- Platforms: iOS, Android
- Release: iOS; CAN: July 2, 2013; WW: December 19, 2013; Android; July 8, 2014
- Genre: Beat 'em up
- Mode: Single-player

Fightback is a 2013 beat 'em up game developed by Ninja Theory and published by Chillingo. In it, the player progresses through towers by defeating enemies. The game released for iOS in 2013 and for Android in July 2014. The game garnered a mixed reception.

== Gameplay ==
In Fightback, the player defeats enemies in various buildings.

In the game, the player controls an unnamed man who must rescue his kidnapped sister from a series of towers. Towers contain a set of levels, each of which must be completed by a set amount of time. While in a level, the player must defeat enemies by kicking, punching, or using a weapon. The player may use their collected in-game currency to purchase one-time power-ups such as invincibility.

== Development and release ==
Fightback was developed by English studio Ninja Theory, a video game studio in Cambridge that previously created games such as Enslaved: Odyssey to the West and DmC: Devil May Cry. Fightback was developed in Unity.

Fightback was showcased at E3 2013. After a soft launch in Canada on July 2, 2013, the game was released globally for iOS on December 19, 2013.

== Reception ==
Reception

Aggregate score
Aggregator	Score
Metacritic	57/100

Review scores
Publication	Score
Destructoid	5/10
Gamezebo	3/5
MacLife	2.5/5
MeriStation	6/10
Pocket Gamer	2.5/5
TouchArcade	2.5/5
Digital Spy	3/5

On Metacritic, the game received a "mixed or average" score of 57 based on 15 critics.

Multiple critics reviewed the game with mixed opinions.
