= Bleeding Edge (video game) =

2020 video game developed by Ninja Theory

- Developer: Ninja Theory
- Publisher: Xbox Game Studios
- Director: Rahni Tucker
- Producer: Dominic Mathews
- Artist: Aaron McElligot
- Engine: Unreal Engine 4
- Platforms: Windows; Xbox One
- Release: 24 March 2020
- Genre: Multiplayer online battle arena
- Mode: Multiplayer

Bleeding Edge is a 2020 multiplayer online battle arena game developed by Ninja Theory and published by Xbox Game Studios. The game was released for Windows and Xbox One on 24 March 2020. It received mixed reviews from critics.

On 28 January 2021, Ninja Theory ended development on Bleeding Edge.

== Gameplay ==
Bleeding Edge has 13 characters to choose from, most of whom have melee attacks, though some of them do have ranged attacks. All characters are one of three classes: Damage, support, or tank. There are three bars for different abilities that go down when the player uses an ability connected to it. Each ability has its own cooldown period as well.

== Development and Release ==
The development of Bleeding Edge began as a passion project and was built out of inspiration from the original Ninja Theory game Kung Fu Chaos. Creative director Rahni Tucker stated the reasoning behind this game existing was "At home, I play a lot of team multiplayer games, all the way from MOBAs to team shooters. And then I was like: where is this game? A third-person action competitive team multiplayer. It doesn't really exist, and it sounds like my dream project". Tucker said they came to that shortly after the development of DmC: Devil May Cry concluded. Tucker pitched the game and at the time nothing came of it but she stated that around halfway for Hellblade, Ninja Theory approached her on the idea and development went into production. The game began with a development team of ten people and by launch had expanded to 25 developers which were a contrast to the average first party Xbox Game Studios large teams with hundreds of developers. Lead artist Aaron McElligo stated that the game began with realistic visuals that Ninja Theory had been known for but quickly realized in a game like this that would not work out.

Bleeding Edge was leaked ahead of reveal at E3 2019. A technical alpha test was announced to begin on 27 June 2019, for those who have signed up via the Bleeding Edge website. The game was released for Xbox One and Windows on 24 March 2020. On 28 January 2021, Ninja Theory ended development on Bleeding Edge.

== Reception ==
Reception

Aggregate score
Aggregator	Score
Metacritic	PC: 62/100; XONE: 66/100

Review scores
Publication	Score
Destructoid	6.5/10
Game Informer	6.75/10
GameSpot	6/10
PC Gamer (US)	58/100

Bleeding Edge received "mixed or average" reviews from critics, according to review aggregator website Metacritic.

PC Gamer criticized the design of the map they played and the controller layout, but praised the feel and look of the melee attacks and abilities.
