= Asha Sharma =

American business executive

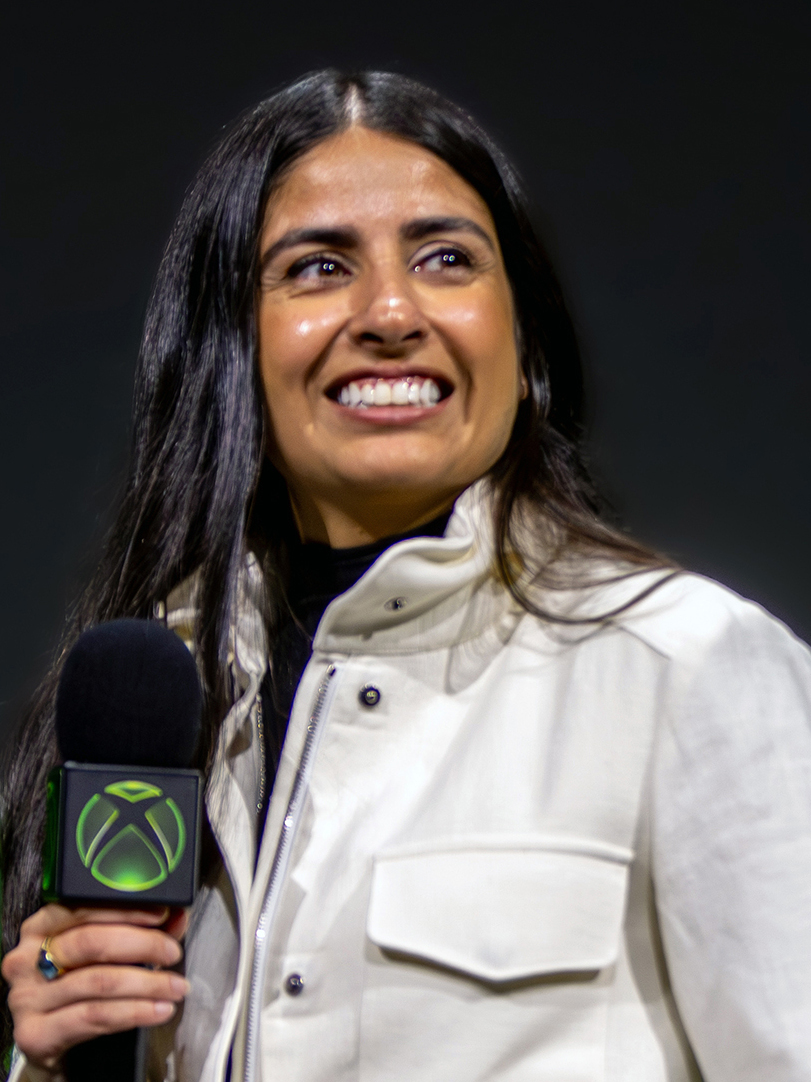
- Sharma in 2026
- Born: Racine, Wisconsin, U.S.
- Education: University of Minnesota (BS)
- Occupation: Business executive
- Title: EVP & CEO of Xbox
- Term: February 20, 2026 – present
- Predecessor: Phil Spencer
- Board member of: Coupang (2024–present); Home Depot (2025–present)
- Children: 3
- Website: Official website

Asha Sharma is an American business executive who serves as executive vice president (EVP) and chief executive officer (CEO) of Xbox. She succeeded Phil Spencer on February 20, 2026. Previously, Sharma served as Microsoft's corporate vice president and head of product for its AI platform from 2024 to 2025. She also worked as president of its CoreAI product organization from 2025 to 2026.

== Early life ==
Sharma was born in Racine, Wisconsin. She is of Indian descent. Her parents had immigrated to the United States from New Zealand and settled in Racine near relatives. Her parents were divorced, and her mother worked at a department store. As a teenager, Sharma worked on a golf course. Her father worked for a family-owned metal fabrication business while completing an engineering degree, and Sharma has credited his approach to work with influencing her own attitude toward school, employment, and extracurricular activities.

During her teenage years, Sharma considered pursuing medicine and envisioned combining it with her interest in sports by working as a physician for the Green Bay Packers. She subsequently attended the University of Minnesota, where she studied business. While in college, she completed several internships, participated in academic research projects in Hungary and Poland, and helped establish a nonprofit organization that raised around $500,000.

She earned a Bachelor of Science degree in business from the Carlson School of Management at the University of Minnesota, graduating in 2011. While she was a student, Sharma launched and led a center for at-risk teenagers called the A-list in Brooklyn Park, which closed soon after her departure.

== Career ==
=== Microsoft and Porch ===
Sharma began her career at S.C. Johnson at the age of 17. After graduating from the University of Minnesota, she joined Microsoft’s marketing department in 2011. In 2013, she joined Porch, a home services technology company, where she eventually became chief operating officer.

=== Facebook ===
In 2017, Sharma joined Facebook, where she held senior product leadership roles, including vice president of product for Messenger and other private communications products across Facebook and Instagram.

=== Instacart (2021–2024) ===
Sharma joined Instacart as chief operating officer (COO) in June 2021. She remained in the position until March 2024. While Sharma was COO, Instacart went public in September 2023 at $42 per share, with Sharma's shares valued at $19 million.

=== Return to Microsoft ===
Sharma returned to Microsoft in March 2024 as corporate vice president and head of product for its AI platform. In September 2025, she became president of Microsoft’s CoreAI product organization.

On February 20, 2026, Sharma was announced as executive vice president and CEO of Microsoft Gaming following the retirement of Phil Spencer. Her selection came as a surprise, passing over Spencer's second-in-command Sarah Bond. Sharma received scrutiny for having no professional experience in the video game industry prior to her appointment to lead Xbox. Sharma's history in user acquisition was a primary motivator for her selection, as Xbox has seen declining console sales over recent years. In a statement following her appointment, Sharma promised to "recommit to our core Xbox fans and players" and "not chase short-term efficiency or flood our ecosystem with soulless AI slop.” On April 23, 2026, Microsoft Gaming became known as Xbox, and Sharma’s title became CEO of Xbox.

Under Sharma, Xbox lowered the price of Xbox Game Pass Ultimate and wound down the development of Copilot on Xbox consoles and on the Xbox app. IGN described the Game Pass price reduction as "a great first step" toward fixing Xbox's problems. During this time, Sharma also retired the "This is an Xbox" marketing campaign.

In July 2026, Sharma announced what she described as "the most significant restructure in Xbox history", involving approximately 3,200 job cuts during fiscal year 2027, including 1,600 immediate role eliminations. In an email to employees, she said the business was "not healthy", was operating at margins "3–10x lower than comparable platform and publishing businesses", and that Microsoft "must reset Xbox". The restructuring also included Compulsion Games and Double Fine Productions becoming independent, Ninja Theory and Undead Labs entering agreements to move to new ownership, and Arkane entering consultation over a potential sale or spin-off.

=== Federal Reserve Productivity and Jobs Task Force ===
Sharma was appointed to the United States Federal Reserve's Productivity and Jobs Task Force in June 2026 to advise on the economic impact of artificial intelligence and other emerging technologies on employment and productivity.

=== Board memberships ===
As of 2026, Sharma was serving as a board member at Coupang, Home Depot and Paley Center for Media. She previously served as a board member at Porch, Seattle Foundation, and Virginia Mason Medical Center.

== Personal life ==
Sharma is married and has a blended family. She has three children. She became a stepmother before she and her husband had two children of their own. She has spoken about the challenge of balancing the demands of an executive career with raising a family and has said that her personal life has taught her to become more comfortable with uncertainty. She has cited Indian-American businesswoman Indra Nooyi as an inspiration.

Sharma is a second-degree black belt in taekwondo. She posted in 2026 that she had recently begun playing video games under the gamertag AMRAHSAHSA to "learn and understand" the games industry.

== See also ==
- Matt Booty
