= Heavenly Sword (film) =

- Theatrical release poster
- Directed by: Gun Ho Jung
- Screenplay by: Todd Farmer
- Based on: Heavenly Sword by Ninja Theory
- Produced by: Brad Foxhoven; David Wohl
- Starring: Anna Torv; Alfred Molina; Thomas Jane; Ashleigh Ball
- Edited by: Nicholas D. Johnson; Alex McDonnell
- Music by: Justin Micheal La Vallee
- Production companies: Blockade Entertainment; PlayStation Originals; Film Financial Services; Sansoo Ventures, Inc.
- Distributed by: TriCoast Worldwide
- Release date: September 2, 2014
- Country: United States
- Language: English
- Budget: $1.8 million

Heavenly Sword is a 2014 American adult animated action-adventure fantasy film based on the 2007 video game of the same name, developed by companies Sony and Ninja Theory. It was released digitally, and theatrically in selected regions.

== Plot ==
It is foretold that a human savior will wield the Heavenly Sword. In the past, the Raven Lord would go to war with anyone just to gain power. But when humanity was at its wits end, a warrior descended from the Heavens. He challenged and defeated the Raven Lord with the Heavenly Sword. When the fight ended, the warrior disappeared, leaving behind his sword. Men would fight anyone tooth and nail just to wield the Heavenly Sword's unearthly power. Eventually, the Heavenly Sword was entrusted to the ancient clan of nomadic warriors to ensure that man does not use it for evil purposes.

From here, the film's plot follows that of the game quite loosely. The film begins with Nariko, who is a part of that very same clan that were entrusted with the Heavenly Sword. She is known as the failure of the clan, including her father. She is skilled in fighting but her father, Shen, does not recognize her skills since she is a female.

When King Bohan's assassins invade the clan's fortress, Nariko demonstrates her skills by killing many assassins and rescuing Kyo. Bohan knows the clan guards the Heavenly Sword and came to get it since it is the only sword that can kill him. Shen sees her skills and gives her the Heavenly Sword to protect. She is to travel west, while her father and the remaining clan members travel east.

While escaping some of Bohan's soldiers, the bridge fell. Waiting on the other side is Bohan. He wants her to hand the sword over or be killed like her father and Kai, her sister. Nariko never knew that Kai was her sister. Apparently, on the night of Nariko's birth, Shen left the fortress to impregnate many women to correct his mistake: having Nariko. Months later, Kai was born, another failure.

But there is another surprise. Two days before Christmas, one of the women Shen impregnated gave birth to a son, unbeknownst to him. The woman faked her own death and escaped to a fishing village in the north. The son is the chosen one. Bohan spent twenty long years searching for him.

When Nariko was about to give the sword to Bohan, she changed her mind. Since she has nothing to live for, she grabbed the sword and jumped down the ravine.

As the year of the Firehorse began years ago, Nariko was born. No one knew that firstborn child would be a daughter instead of a son. Disappointed in having a daughter, Shen sent Nariko to live far away, in the forest. Prophet Takashi took this opportunity to train her to become a warrior in secrecy.

As Nariko wakes up, she finds that she is in front of a campfire. The person who fished her out is Kai. Kai knew that Nariko is her sister but didn't say anything because Shen didn't want to be Kai's father. They decide to travel north to find their brother.

As they traveled, Nariko learned about Kai's mother. Her mother was strong and funny. When Shen visited, he would bring gold – “to help”. One day, Flying Fox came. When her mother saw him, she hid Kai in a cave. He had come to get Kai. Fox and his men killed her people and mother.

Before they reached the fishing village in the dead marsh, General Whiptail's soldiers killed many villagers. With the help of Nariko and the Heavenly Sword and Kai and her crossbow, they helped some of the villagers and got directions to their brother. But when they reached the hut that their brother, Loki, should have lived in, they learned that he left a year ago for the northeast. He wanted to become a blacksmith for a foreign king.

Whiptail overhears this and orders her soldiers to kill them. When Nariko and Kai kill her, they are informed that Whiptail already told the villagers that whoever tells Bohan of Loki's whereabouts will be rewarded beyond their wildest dreams.

But when Nariko and Kai reached the fortress in the northeast, Bohan's soldiers were already coming. The effects of the Heavenly Sword start to show in Nariko. It is slowly draining her soul, trying to kill its bearer. From deduction, they find out that the king Loki is trying to work for is none other than Bohan and the fortress in the northeast is Bohan's as well. They see Shen getting dragged to a cage and that Bohan lied to them about Shen and their people.

In the fortress, they find and rescue Takashi and the other clan members. They learn that Kyo, the person who bullies the sisters, rode to Bohan's army after the sisters left but dies fighting them. They told Shen about their brother and that he is the chosen one. Shen said that he was doing the right thing when he impregnated many women. He learned the errors of his ways and his daughters forgave him. As Shen was about to die, Nariko used the Heavenly Sword's power to bring him back but the effects start to get worse.

Nariko and Kai arrive to Bohan's blacksmith forge but are too late. The couple they helped earlier when they arrived at Loki's village sold him out. There were others after them but since they were the first, they get the gold. Nariko and Kai rescue Loki and killed Bohan's son.

After Nariko gives the Heavenly Sword to Loki, he is killed by Flying Fox. He does the same to Kai. During a difficult battle, Kai, who was just unconscious and badly wounded, killed the real Flying Fox. Kai stops Nariko before she could use the sword's healing power.

The sisters spend three days traveling back to their homeland, all while Bohan's army follows on their trail. Nariko fainted when they arrive home. She tells Shen that his son is dead and Bohan is coming. She isn't going to fight for her people but for Kai, her only real family.

When Bohan's army arrives, Nariko learns that Kyo, who is supposed to be dead, is alive. He was the one who told Bohan where the Heavenly Sword was. He did it because he knows that Bohan was always coming and once the sword is given to him, the clan will be free. She refuses so Bohan commands his army to rain arrows on them. She uses the sword's power to shield her against them but Kyo isn't so lucky – he dies.

Nariko is one woman against Bohan's entire army. She uses the Heavenly Sword power as seen in the beginning of the film. After using its power, she is transported into the sword. It hates her. She tells it that Bohan will melt the sword and that it needs her. The sword gave her its power which she uses to defeat Bohan's army.

Bohan, having seen the sword's power, sacrifices his soul to the Raven King. She defeats him. The Raven King abandons Bohan's body and plucks out his eyes. Roach, Bohan's son, was alive and tells her to leave or else he will kill her.

Nariko returns to her home and tells her father that the sword didn't choose her, she chose it. She uses the sword's healing power to resurrect a dying Kai. Nariko entrusts the sword to Kai, as deities cannot stay. Upon her dying breath, she tells Shen to love Kai as he never did to Nariko.

In Nariko's narration, she knows Kai will master the Heavenly Sword and that they will meet again in a better world. The sword might be forgotten but Kai will still be remembered.

During the end credits, Kai is seen picking up the sword and grins at the audience implying she will carry on Nariko's legacy as the new owner of the sword.

== Voice cast ==
- Anna Torv as Nariko
- Alfred Molina as King Bohan
- Thomas Jane as Loki
- Ashleigh Ball as Kai
- Barry Dennen as Prophet Takashi, Flying Fox
- Nolan North as Master Shen, Kyo, Roach
- Renae Geerlings as Whiptail / Old Woman

== Production ==
Development of the movie started as an experimental project between Blockade Entertainment and Sony. Due to advances in CGI technology, Blockade was able to begin creating a movie that could look like bigger-budget Hollywood movies. In making the film, Blockade used extensive assets from the original game, which included a large amount of material archived by Andy Serkis.

After initial cuts were positively received, the film was taken to the Cannes Film Festival, where multiple buyers opted to release the film theatrically in their respective markets. Actress Anna Torv, who played Nariko in the original game, returned to voice the character again, while Alfred Molina was brought in to voice Bohan when the original voice actor, Andy Serkis, was unavailable. Among the actors brought in were Thomas Jane, who played the new character Loki, Nolan North, and Barry Dennen.

== See also ==
- List of films based on video games
