= Senua (video game) =

Upcoming video game

- Developer: Ninja Theory
- Publisher: Xbox Game Studios
- Series: Hellblade
- Engine: Unreal Engine 5
- Platforms: PlayStation 5; Windows; Xbox Series X/S
- Release: 2027
- Genre: Action-adventure
- Mode: Single-player

Senua is an upcoming action-adventure video game developed by Ninja Theory and published by Xbox Game Studios. It is the third installment in the Hellblade series, and is set to be released for PlayStation 5, Windows and Xbox Series X/S in 2027.

== Gameplay ==
Senua is an action-adventure game played from a third-person perspective. Players control Senua as she traverses larger and more open environments than those featured in previous Hellblade games. The game places a greater emphasis on player agency, exploration and puzzle-solving while retaining the narrative focus and psychological themes of earlier entries in the series. Unlike previous Hellblade titles, Senua was designed as a larger-scale action-adventure game. Combat allows Senua to engage multiple enemies simultaneously, dual-wield weapons, employ special abilities, and battle a variety of mythological creatures and large-scale bosses. Players can use a variety of ways to approach encounters, including the ability to avoid direct confrontation through stealth. Senua can also use Focus Abilities during traversal, puzzle-solving and combat, including powers that alter her perception of reality and reveal new paths through the world.

== Premise ==
Set after the events of Senua's Saga: Hellblade II, the game follows Senua as she becomes trapped between life and death in a vision of purgatory based on her childhood homeland. Believing that she can reach the afterlife and reunite with those she has loved and lost, Senua embarks on a quest while confronting forces that threaten everything she believes in. The game's reveal trailer depicts Senua emerging from a mysterious golden substance at the beginning of her journey.

As in previous games in the series, events are presented through Senua's experience of psychosis, manifested by voices that accompany her throughout her journey.

== Development ==
Senua is being developed by Cambridge-based studio Ninja Theory. According to studio head Dom Matthews, the title Senua was chosen because the project represented "something fresh and new and different" for the franchise. While continuing Senua's story, the game was developed as a distinct action-adventure title rather than being marketed as Hellblade III. The team described the game as a "standalone sequel", with Ninja Theory adding that players do not need to play the previous games to understand its narrative. The game's standalone nature allowed the studio to focus on providing "more agency and a lot more gameplay" to players according to Matthews. The game is being developed using Unreal Engine 5.

Senua was announced by Ninja Theory and Xbox Game Studios during the Xbox Games Showcase on 7 June 2026 with a release set for 2027 for PlayStation 5, Windows and Xbox Series X/S. Xbox Game Studios was already considering closing or selling Ninja Theory prior to the announcement of Senua. They used the Senua reveal as an incentive to entice potential buyers for the studio.

With two separate agreements to sell Ninja Theory to private investors having fallen through, Xbox COO Matt Booty raised the possibility of the studio being closed down by Microsoft. Reports of layoffs at Ninja Theory emerged in early October 2026.
