= Kung Fu Chaos =

2003 video game

- PAL version cover art
- Developer: Just Add Monsters
- Publisher: Microsoft Game Studios
- Designers: Tameem Antoniades; Nina Kristensen; Mike Ball
- Artist: Antonio Paliman
- Writers: Kami Back; James Richardson
- Composers: Andrew Barnabas; Paul Arnold
- Platform: Xbox
- Release: NA: 25 February 2003; EU: 11 April 2003; JP: 29 May 2003
- Genres: Fighting, party
- Modes: Single-player, multiplayer

Kung Fu Chaos is a 2003 3D fighting party game developed by Just Add Monsters and published by Microsoft Game Studios for the Xbox. Described as a "multiplayer brawler", the game is a comedic beat 'em up title with a stylistic presentation inspired by kung fu films. Kung Fu Chaos was the first title developed by Ninja Theory, a Cambridge studio formed by former staff of Millennium Interactive to pursue an independent project. Initial development was self-funded, with a prototype developed by a team of four to eight to pitch to publishers. The final version of the game was financed under an acquisition of the studio by Argonaut Games and a publishing deal with Microsoft Game Studios.

Upon release, Kung Fu Chaos received mixed reviews, with the game receiving praise for its unique tone, humor, and level design, whilst also receiving criticism for its limited depth of gameplay and fighting mechanics. The game also received criticism from some publications for its stereotypical racial representation of Asians, particularly the character Shao Ting.

Kung Fu Chaos was a commercial disappointment upon release, with the developer attributing poor sales performance to a lack of marketing on the part of the publisher. Development on a cancelled sequel to the game, Kung Fu Story, influenced the direction by the studio to develop an action title with a more serious tone, Heavenly Sword, for the PlayStation 3 in 2007.

== Gameplay ==
A screenshot of gameplay in Kung Fu Chaos

Kung Fu Chaos is a fighting game that takes place within the shooting of a fictional film of the same name, with director Shao Ting acting as narrator and guide to the gameplay. In line with this theme, the game's stages reflect various scenes of the film being produced. Gameplay features several modes, including 'Ninja Challenge', a campaign mode with a progression of unlockable scenes consisting of 'Main Feature' levels and various minigames. 'Main Feature' scenes require players to fight and survive levels within a time limit. Players progress and unlock further scenes if the players beat bosses in the time allotted and receive sufficient stars on the 'Star Meter', which gradually increases as the player defeats enemies in the level. Other modes in the game include 'Battle Game', allowing for local multiplayer play of an unlocked level selected by the player, 'Championship' and 'Miniseries', a series of random levels chosen by the computer, 'Freestyle', an arena-style fight in a single area, and 'Rehearsal', a practice mode.

The game features a roster of six playable characters and three unlockable characters. Each character features similar controls and attacks, with different taunts and special attacks. Similar to other fighting games, combat mechanics in Kung Fu Chaos require the player to use a mixture of combos on the controller to perform different attacks, including fast and heavy attacks, tripping opponents, picking up and throwing items, jumping and jump kicking, and spin attacks. Players can also use blocks and counters to defend against enemy attacks. The game features a taunt system in which players gain power-ups when taunting after defeating an enemy. During a taunt, a player is momentarily vulnerable, allowing enemies or other players to interrupt them, or steal a taunt on the other player's taunt meter. Once three taunts have been successfully performed, the player can perform a Super Attack that cannot be defended against by enemies.

== Development and release ==
Kung Fu Chaos was the debut game of Just Add Monsters, an independent Cambridge-based games studio founded in 2000. The studio was founded by three former members of Cambridge studio Millennium Interactive, Tameem Antoniades, Nina Kristensen, and Mike Ball, who departed the studio following its acquisition by Sony Computer Entertainment in 1997. Antoniades made the decision to leave Millennium Interactive and form an independent studio after Sony rejected his pitch for a proposed title named Moon Warrior, a kung-fu fighting game inspired by Once Upon a Time in China. The concept of Kung Fu Chaos expanded upon the ideas presented under the Moon Warrior concept, with several influences taken from kung fu movies. Antoniades described the concept of the game as "a kung fu game based around Jackie Chan movies", stating "at the time those Hong Kong movies were copying western movies but adding kung fu to it, and I thought right, there's an idea – make a story about a crazy director with a 'safety last' approach trying to emulate American Hollywood movies using kung fu actors and make it a chaotic four-player multiplayer game.” Similarly, Kristensen stated that the "flavour of (the) game" was rooted in the "accidental humor" of "old school kung fu movies that had questionable dubbing, hilarious mistranslation and ridiculous plot lines...merging with disco, funk and blaxploitation as evidenced in Enter the Dragon, Shaft (and) Charlie's Angels."

Initial development of Kung Fu Chaos was completed over three months in a team of "four to eight people", with a prototype developed on a highly restricted budget from a bedroom. The three developers pitched the game to studios based upon a "full design spec covering everything from level designs to combat mechanics." The studio was acquired in October 2000 by Argonaut Games for £410,000 in cash and loans, and secured a publishing deal with Microsoft Game Studios, allowing the development team to finance production of the game and expand to a team of 20. The soundtrack of Kung Fu Chaos was composed by duo Paul Arnold and Andrew Barnabas. The duo stated the soundtrack was inspired by Lalo Schiffrin's music on Enter the Dragon and was "a fusion of funk and authentic Chinese instrumentalists". Antioniades stated that the game had a troubled release, citing the decision of Microsoft Game Studios marketing staff to distribute an "early" and "untextured" build of the game with "placeholder sound" and "no effects" to review magazines and websites without the knowledge of the studio. Just Add Monsters reported that the game was released "on time (and) on budget". In Japan, the game was ported for release under the name Kung Fu Panic (カンフーパニック, Kan Fū Panikku) on 29 May 2003.

=== Sales ===
Kung Fu Chaos was a commercial disappointment upon release. In European sales charts, the title peaked at 6 for Xbox titles, and 36 for combined full price games. Writing for Games Industry, Rob Fahey stated that the title "didn't shift any units" and the game was a "retail failure." Antoniades stated that the game "tanked at retail" as it had a limited marketing budget with "no ads (and) no support", a position shared by outlets including Kristan Reed for Eurogamer, who speculated that Kung Fu Chaos experienced low sales "given the fact it has devoted a slim marketing budget to the title."

== Reception ==
Reception

Aggregate score
Aggregator	Score
Metacritic	68/100

Review scores
Publication	Score
AllGame	2.5/5
Edge	7/10
Electronic Gaming Monthly	5/10
Eurogamer	8/10
Famitsu	30/40
Game Informer	6.5/10
GamePro	4/5
GameRevolution	B
GameSpot	6.5/10
GameSpy	3/5
GameZone	6.6/10
IGN	6.3/10
Official Xbox Magazine (US)	6.9/10
Play	4.5/5
GMR	6/10
Xbox Nation	5/10

Kung Fu Chaos received "mixed or average" reviews according to the review aggregation website Metacritic, with an average review score of 68% across 41 reviews. Several critics praised the design of the game's stages. Writing for GMR, Greg Orlando stated the stages for their "chaotic fun" and "rapid-fire changes in scenery". Christian Nutt of GameSpy praised the "spot-on, clever and attractive" design of the game, stating "the developers have crafted some really imaginative and clever levels that give the game the depth and flavor of an old-school Final Fight-style brawler." Evan Shamoon of Xbox Nation praised the levels as "notable achievements, offering an impressive degree of dynamic interaction and a constant stream of eye candy". Dave Rees of Official Xbox Magazine praised the game's "wild atmosphere", stating "there's a lot of added depth in how you can interact with objects and use the environment to your advantage."

Many critics remarked that the fighting game mechanics of Kung Fu Chaos were simplistic. Writing for GameSpot, Greg Kasavin noted that whilst "there's a decent variety of moves and combos in all", "all the characters basically play the same way...it can be difficult to tell which character is yours and what exactly is going on, so you'll likely resort to mashing on buttons and hoping for the best." Hilary Goldstein of IGN observed that "the fighting engine is so incredibly basic" and "too easy", remarking that "there are so few moves that combos become an unconscious act." Electronic Gaming Monthly stated the game was "not as robust as a real fighter. Once you figure out how to taunt and bust out super attacks, it's a cinch", critiquing the "dearth of enemy types".

=== Controversy ===
Kung Fu Chaos received negative reception for the use of stereotypes in its representation of Asian characters and culture, particularly the voice acting for the character Shao Ting. Writing for GameSpy, Christian Nutt critiqued the "questionable sense of humor" in the game, dismissing the character Shao Ting as a "completely racist and utterly despicable caricature of an Asian man." Similarly, Electronic Gaming Monthly critiqued the "inappropriate humor" and "stereotypical character designs", flagging that some players may "take offense at the chop-sockey accents and stereotypes." Evan Shamoon of Xbox Nation described the theme of the game as "ill-conceived", stating "not that it's an inherently racist game, rather, it simply wields its satire with such a lack of grace and humor that it's difficult to rally behind", critiquing the "poor impressions" of Shao Ting's voice actor. In a retrospective of "insensitive" games, Levi Buchanan of IGN stated "the game vainly attempts to wrap itself in the mantle of satire, but its caricatures of Asians are downright unpleasant", citing the "purposefully butchered" dialog.

Just Add Monsters defended the game upon release. Antoniades stated that the studio was "surprised" by the accusations as the game was a homage to kung fu films, and the negative reviews "hurt (the studio) on a personal level because that was not the intention". Antoniades stated that the game had been supported by Microsoft, who ran the game past "various ethnic groups to make sure that they wouldn't find it offensive", and had gone to great effort to imitate the visual style of the kung fu genre. However, Antoniades stated that the management of the controversy by the publisher's marketing department had worsened the situation as they had turned away "gaming magazines, newspapers and radio stations (sending) us mails to offer support and defend the game" on the basis that "no one talks about this", expressing frustration that the decision led to "only those who think the game is racist (being) given a voice". Antoniades suggested that the controversy adversely affected marketing and PR support for the game.

=== Retrospective reception ===
Several publications praised Kung Fu Chaos after release, with many describing the game as an overlooked and cult title on the Xbox. Writing for Play, Dave Halverson described the game as a "sleeper" title for the Xbox, stating the game "was the ultimate melding of action and combat, and stands as one of the most beautiful SD-style games ever built. Too bad America didn't get it." Tom Bramwell of Eurogamer described Kung Fu Chaos as a "cult classic", praising the game's "feel good gameplay, superb technical grace, hilarious voiceovers and general madcap melee combat", noting the game largely "went ignored" upon release. In a more neutral review, Douglass Perry and David Clayman for IGN stated "although it wasn't a great game by any standard, it offered the variety and pick-up-and-play ease that every great party game needs," praising the accessibility of its "simple controls".

== Legacy ==
Following the release of Kung Fu Chaos in February 2003, Just Add Monsters began development of an unreleased sequel titled Kung Fu Story. In response to player feedback, the developers planned to abandon the cartoon presentation of the original and pursue a "slightly more mature style for the game", citing the "expectation from publishers that audiences wanted more realism in their games". By March 2003, Just Add Monsters completed concept work for Kung Fu Story, including prototype videos to demonstrate the desired art style for the game. However, by May 2003, due to the poor commercial performance of Kung Fu Chaos, Microsoft made the decision not to commission a sequel for the Xbox. Development on Kung Fu Story was discontinued due to the ownership of the intellectual property by Microsoft Game Studios.

Following the cancelled development of Kung Fu Story, Just Add Monsters began development of a new game to market to publishers, with the game designed to capitalise on the launch of the next generation of consoles. Development of the title had been underway from November 2003. Following the collapse of its parent company Argonaut Games in 2004, former CEO Jez San acquired Just Add Monsters and rebranded the company to the title Ninja Theory. In September 2004, the title was announced as Heavenly Sword, a "next-generation" fighting game with a more serious and realistic design. Antoniades stated that Kung Fu Story concept "evolved into" Heavenly Sword, with the game heavily influenced by the development of Kung Fu Chaos, stating the game "would never have been possible without the experience we gained from making (it)", citing the lessons of learning "how to make combat work in a third-person game with multiple enemies" and develop fighting games with "object interaction". Heavenly Sword was released by Ninja Theory in September 2007. Ninja Theory would later be bought out by Microsoft in 2018.
