= Sarah Bond (executive) =

American business executive (born 1978)

- Born: October 27, 1978 (age 48); Morristown, New Jersey, U.S.
- Education: Yale University (BA); Harvard Business School (MBA)
- Employer: Microsoft Gaming (2017–2026)
- Title: President of Xbox (until 2026)
- Awards: VentureBeat Visionary Award (2022)

Sarah Bond (born October 27, 1978) is an American business executive and former president of Xbox at Microsoft, where she oversaw the brand's operations as a platform and ecosystem, including hardware and devices, player and creator experiences, platform engineering, strategy, business planning, data and analytics, and business development and partnerships.

== Early life ==
Bond was born in Morristown, New Jersey on October 27, 1978, and is one of seven siblings. Her father Bruce Bond was a telecom CEO, and her mother worked in technology at AT&T, before moving to philanthropy. Bond spent part of her childhood overseas, living in the United Kingdom for ten years for her education before returning to the United States. She is an Economics graduate from Yale University and holds an MBA from Harvard Business School.

== Career ==
Bond began her career as an associate partner at McKinsey & Company. Transitioning to T-Mobile, she held key roles, including chief of staff to CEO John Legere and later senior vice president of corporate strategy and development.

In 2017, Bond joined Microsoft, starting as a corporate vice president overseeing gaming business development and partnerships at Xbox. She later assumed the position of corporate vice president of game creator experience and ecosystem. Bond played a pivotal role representing Microsoft during the scrutinized bid to acquire Activision Blizzard, including testifying at the 2022 FTC v. Microsoft trial.

In 2022, she received the Visionary Award from GamesBeat for her contributions to the industry. On October 26, 2023, Bond was promoted to president of Xbox, reporting directly to Microsoft Gaming CEO Phil Spencer. On February 20, 2026, Microsoft CEO Satya Nadella announced that Bond would leave Microsoft alongside Spencer, following the appointment of Asha Sharma as the next Executive Vice President of Xbox. In June 2026, Bond's name appeared in a leaked document as an attendee of the Peter Thiel-backed invite-only society Dialog, alongside the names of high-ranking politicians, tech figures and members of the media.

Bond served on the boards of organizations such as Zuora, Chegg, and the Entertainment Software Association (ESA).
