= Matt Booty =

American business executive

- Education: Purdue University (MFA)
- Occupation: Business executive
- Years active: 1991–present
- Employer(s): Midway Games (1991–2010); Microsoft (2010–present)
- Title: President & CEO of Midway Games (2008–2010); EVP & CCO of Xbox (2026–present)
- Term: February 20, 2026–present
- Children: 1

Matt Booty is an American business executive who serves as the Executive Vice President (EVP) and Chief Content Officer (CCO) of Xbox. In his current role, Booty oversees the company's first-party game content strategy, product development, and business operations across Xbox Game Studios, Bethesda Softworks, Activision, Blizzard Entertainment, and King.

== Career ==
Matt Booty studied engineering and liberal arts at Purdue University.

=== Midway Games ===
Matt Booty began his video game career at Midway Games in 1991. He co-designed the Digital Compression System with Ed Keenan used as the sound system on 1990's pinball and arcade machines. He recorded some of the voices on the 1992 pinball machine, Creature from the Black Lagoon.

After becoming general manager of Midway's Chicago studio in 2002, he was promoted to vice president of worldwide studios the following year, overseeing the company's game development operations.

In 2008, Booty became President and Chief Executive Officer of Midway Games during a period of financial difficulty. Matt Booty led restructuring efforts and refocused the company on its core franchises, particularly Mortal Kombat, before Midway filed for Chapter 11 bankruptcy in 2009. Following the sale of the company's assets to Warner Bros. Interactive Entertainment, Booty departed in 2010 after nearly two decades with Midway.

=== Xbox ===
Matt Booty joined Microsoft Studios in 2010. Booty became Corporate Vice President overseeing Minecraft following Microsoft's acquisition of Mojang Studios in 2014. In January 2018, Booty was promoted to Corporate Vice President and Head of Microsoft Studios. During his tenure, Microsoft significantly expanded its internal development organization by creating new studios and acquiring established developers, including Ninja Theory, Obsidian Entertainment, inXile Entertainment, Double Fine Productions, and Compulsion Games. Microsoft Studios was later renamed Xbox Game Studios. In 2021, Matt Booty's responsibilities expanded following Microsoft's acquisition of ZeniMax Media, which brought Bethesda Softworks and its development studios into Xbox's portfolio. Booty also led Xbox's strategy of launching first-party titles on Xbox Game Pass on release day while expanding development across console, PC, and cloud gaming.

Internal Microsoft emails released during the acquisition of Activision Blizzard trial showed that Booty advocated for an aggressive acquisition strategy, writing that Microsoft was in a position to "spend Sony out of business." The emails also discussed pursuing acquisitions such as Sega, Bungie, and Niantic. In October 2023, Microsoft promoted Booty to President of Game Content and Studios following the completion of its acquisition of Activision Blizzard. His responsibilities expanded to include oversight of Xbox Game Studios and ZeniMax Media, while Activision, Blizzard Entertainment, and King were integrated into Microsoft's gaming organization.

Following Phil Spencer's retirement and the appointment of Asha Sharma as CEO of Xbox in February 2026, Booty was promoted to Executive Vice President and Chief Content Officer. In this role, Booty leads Xbox's global content strategy, product development, and business operations for first-party gaming content across the company's studios.
