= DmC: Devil May Cry =

2013 video game

- Developer: Ninja Theory
- Publisher: Capcom
- Director: Tameem Antoniades
- Producers: Motohide Eshiro; Yohei Uchida; Alex Jones
- Artists: Stuart Adcock; Alessandro Taini
- Writer: Tameem Antoniades
- Composers: Noisia; Combichrist (Note: The music for the Vergil's Downfall DLC was composed by Jason Graves.)
- Series: Devil May Cry
- Engine: Unreal Engine 3
- Platforms: PlayStation 3; Xbox 360; Windows; PlayStation 4; Xbox One
- Release: 15 January 2013: PlayStation 3, Xbox 360; WW: 15 January 2013 Windows; AU: 24 January 2013; WW: 25 January 2013 PlayStation 4, Xbox One; WW: 10 March 2015
- Genres: Action-adventure, hack and slash
- Mode: Single-player

DmC: Devil May Cry is a 2013 action-adventure game developed by Ninja Theory and published by Capcom. The game's story takes place in a separate continuity from previous Devil May Cry games. The story takes place in Limbo City, a modern-day city secretly controlled by all-powerful demons who manipulate humanity by bestowing the comforts of life. It follows Dante, a young demon hunter whose twin brother Vergil recruits to help defeat the demon king Mundus. The hack-and-slash gameplay is similar to previous Devil May Cry games; as Dante, the player uses a variety of melee weapons and firearms to defeat enemies. The game introduces modifiers, known as Angel Mode and Devil Mode, to Dante's moveset; the modifiers aid in both combat and traversal.

DmC was conceived as a reboot of the Devil May Cry series to increase its commercial appeal following Devil May Cry 4 (2008). Capcom recruited Ninja Theory after being impressed by their work on Heavenly Sword (2007). The development team included over ninety members with nearly ten of them being from Capcom, which assisted the development of the game's combat system and gave Ninja Theory freedom in creating the game's world and characters. Tameem Antoniades directed the game, Alex Garland served as its narrative consultant, and Hideaki Itsuno supervised the project. At Capcom's request, Dante received a drastic redesign inspired by Hollywood movies. The tone of the game was more mature than that of its predecessors; its setting of Limbo City was designed to be more grounded and lived-in, and was inspired by European cities such as Genoa and Barcelona. The electronic music band Noisia and industrial metal band Combichrist contributed to the game's soundtracks.

Following its reveal at the Tokyo Game Show in September 2010, DmC received a negative response from Devil May Cry fans, who criticized the reboot and Dante's redesign. However, after it was released for PlayStation 3, Xbox 360, and Windows in January 2013, it received positive reviews, with praise for the gameplay, art style, and story. The game had sold 4.4 million copies by March 2024, but did not meet Capcom's initial expectations. It was supported with a paid downloadable content (DLC) pack, which follows Vergil after the game's ending. A Definitive Edition remaster including all DLC, new costumes, and additional gameplay features was released for PlayStation 4 and Xbox One in March 2015. The next game in the franchise, Devil May Cry 5 (2019) returned to the original Devil May Cry continuity and gameplay formula, while incorporating a more realistic art-style similar to that of DmC.

== Gameplay ==
Dante battling demons in Limbo using his semi-automatic pistols. The player combat performance is indicated by the rank shown at the top right corner.

DmC: Devil May Cry is a hack and slash action-adventure video game played from a third-person perspective. In the game, the player assumes control of Dante, who must use his powers and weaponry to fight against enemies and navigate treacherous Limbo City. Dante's primary weapon of choice is his sword named Rebellion, and his dual pistols named Ebony and Ivory. As a hack-and-slash game, DmC allows players to string together consecutive attacks to form combos or perform special moves. Dante can also launch enemies into the air with his sword, parry incoming attacks, and quickly dodge. Occasionally, players will be able to activate "Devil Trigger" mode, which makes Dante faster and more powerful, regenerates his health, and launches weaker enemies into the air. Unlike previous games in the series, DmC forgoes a manual lock-on system and instead tracks enemies automatically with its game camera. A player's performance is scored and rated according to different ranks. Players can obtain higher ranks by fighting enemies with style, varying their own combos, and avoiding being hit by enemies, which will reset the score. Higher ratings grant Dante increased attack power. The enemies' artificial intelligence adapts to player performance, becoming more aggressive at higher scores and less aggressive at lower ones. Scores can be shared online through a leaderboard.

New to the series are modifiers to Dante's moveset, known as Angel Mode and Devil Mode. In Angel Mode, Dante wields a scythe which allows him to launch fast, long-ranged attacks that get increasingly powerful, while in Devil Mode, he wields a slower, more powerful axe that deals significant damage to a single enemy. Eventually, he will unlock more weapons, including a flaming gauntlet, a pair of throwing blades, and a sawed-off shotgun. Some enemies are only vulnerable to certain weapon types, requiring players to adjust their playstyle. Angel weapons allows Dante to grapple onto distant or flying enemies and pull him towards them, while Devil weapons pull lighter enemies towards him. These abilities will also aid Dante's traversal during the game's platforming sections, allowing him to reach distant areas. As players defeat enemies, earn high scores, and interact with the environment, they can purchase new moves and upgrade existing ones. Players can also gain red orbs, which can be used to purchase upgrades to increase Dante's overall health, boost the effectiveness of Devil's Trigger; and golden orbs, which resurrect Dante if he is killed.

While the game's 20 missions are linear, levels in the game feature optional areas, some of which can only be unlocked when the player replays the game with the full arsenal unlocked. There are also challenge rooms, which task players to complete missions under certain requirements. The game features three difficulty levels. Once the player completes the game in any of the three levels, four additional levels are unlocked, increasing the gameplay challenge through changing enemy placement, adding new enemy behaviors, and modifying the health of both Dante and enemies. The Definitive Edition of the game introduces "Turbo Mode", which further boosts the overall gameplay speed by 20%.

== Plot ==
The game is set in a parallel universe of the series. It takes place in Limbo City, a modern-day city secretly controlled by all-powerful demons, manipulating humanity through bestowing on humanity the comforts of life, with the demons themselves residing in a parallel plane called "Limbo". Living on the fringes of society is Dante, a young man aware of the existence of demons, devoting himself to fighting them in secret, but otherwise wasting his life by indulging in junk food and sex.

One day, Dante is warned by a young woman named Kat that he is in danger, just as a Hunter demon drags him into Limbo. Dante slays the Hunter with Kat's help, as she can see into Limbo with her psychic powers. Dante returns to the human world and accepts Kat's offer to meet with her boss, Vergil. Along the way, Kat explains that Vergil leads "The Order", an organization intent on exposing the demons and releasing the world from their control. Vergil explains that he wants Dante to join the Order and reveals that he and Dante are not only long-lost twin brothers but also Nephilim, the children of an angel and a demon and the only beings capable of killing the demon king Mundus. Their father, Sparda, was Mundus's chief lieutenant in the war against the angels until he betrayed Mundus by fathering twins with the angel Eva. Mundus, afraid of the Nephilim and seeing them as abominations, killed Eva and condemned Sparda to eternal torture while vowing to hunt down Dante, unaware of Vergil's existence. After learning of his past by visiting his family's decrepit mansion, Dante resolves to help Vergil bring down Mundus and his regime.

Dante, with help from Kat, gradually destroys Mundus's operations and slays the demons who manage them on his behalf. During the final stages of his campaign, Dante witnesses a SWAT team raid the Order's headquarters, killing all of Vergil's followers. Dante rescues Vergil from Limbo, but is helpless to protect Kat from being beaten and taken to Mundus. Dante then kidnaps Lilith, Mundus's demon concubine who carries Mundus's unborn child, and offers to trade her for Kat. During the exchange, Vergil shoots Lilith, killing her and the child she carried. He, Dante, and Kat escape as Mundus tears much of the city apart in an outburst that weakens the "Hellgate", a portal to the demon world within his stronghold in Silver Sacks Tower. Kat, recovering from her injuries, leads the brothers through a plan to infiltrate the Tower and defeat Mundus. Dante draws Mundus out of his lair and Vergil seals the Hellgate, rendering Mundus mortal. Mundus forms a massive body for himself from the city's rubble and confronts the brothers, but Dante reaches his physical body and destroys him. Limbo collapses into the human world, making demons visible to humans and creating chaos worldwide.

With Mundus dead, Vergil reveals his true intentions: he intends to rule humanity in the demon king's place alongside his brother. Vergil argues that as Nephilim, he and Dante must protect humans "from themselves" and states that they would "rule with respect". Vergil also abandons Kat, regarding her as worthless because she is human. Dante is appalled by his brother's true nature and the two fight, with Dante emerging victorious. Kat stops Dante from killing his brother and Vergil leaves in disgrace. Faced with a world now infested with demons and abandoned by the only family he has left, Dante questions his own identity and purpose. With his hair now completely white after using the full extent of his power, Dante devotes himself to protecting humans by hunting demons.

=== Vergil's Downfall ===
After losing to his brother, Vergil finds himself in an unknown dimension where he is guided by the voice of his mother to "head toward the lights". Vergil follows the lights, only to be confronted by illusions of Kat and Dante, the latter of whom stabs him again. Vergil is saved by an illusion of himself and is forced to fight hordes of demons while he recovers from his wounds. Vergil "kills" the illusions of his brother and Kat, and his mother disappears after expressing horror at seeing what Vergil has become. Vergil completes his ordeal by killing his own illusion in combat, absorbing its power, and is returned to the real world. Demons approach him and accepts him as their new king. Confident of his future, Vergil departs to lead his new army to places unknown.

== Development ==
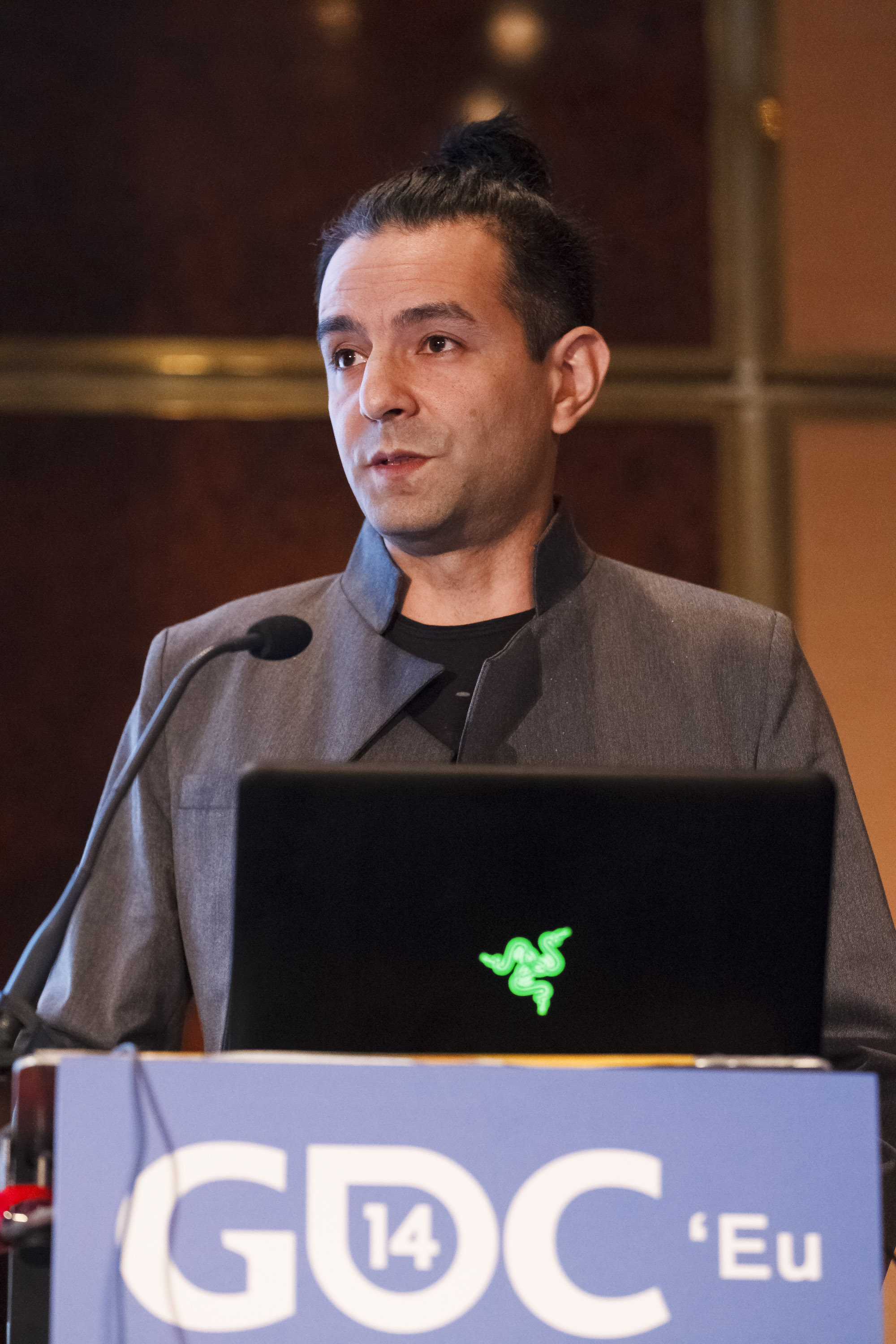
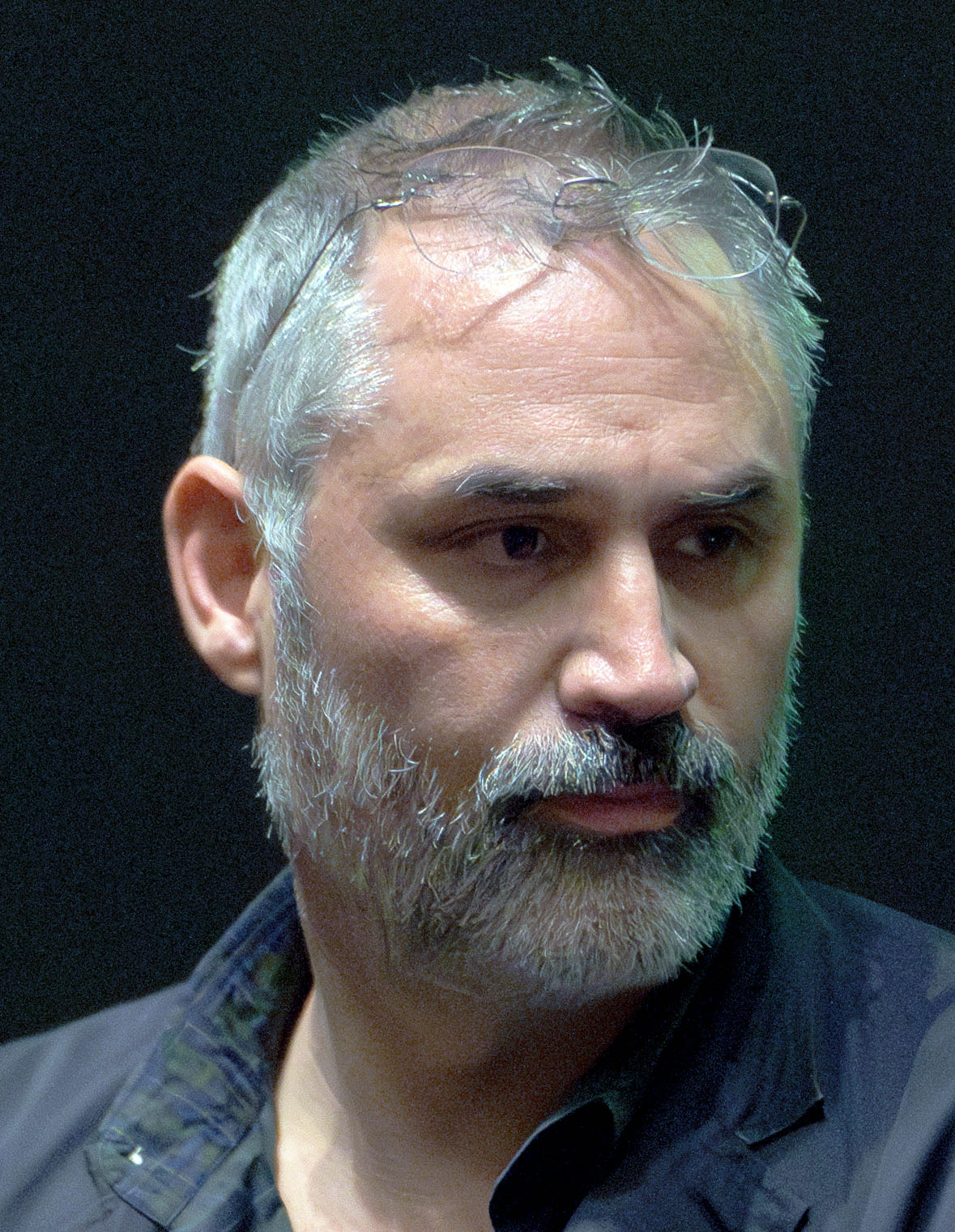
Tameem Antoniades (left) served as the game's director while Alex Garland (right) served as its story supervisor

Under the leadership of Global Head of Production Keiji Inafune, publisher Capcom greenlit several projects to westernize its portfolio of video games. Capcom Japan approached its division in America to find a new direction for the Devil May Cry franchise in an attempt to boost sales and introduce the game to a broader audience. UK-based studio Ninja Theory was chosen to develop a new project, as Capcom was impressed by their work on Heavenly Sword and felt that they were capable of creating games with a good story and immersive atmosphere. They were also impressed by Ninja Theory's technology and fast pace of game development. Pre-production of the game started when Enslaved: Odyssey to the West was approaching release. The development team included over ninety members, with nearly ten of them being from Capcom. Capcom producer Motohide Eshiro remarked that the collaboration was a stimulating experience for the team, though he added that development was challenged by the language differences between the two studios. Capcom also had to tone down the game's overall violence level, removing gameplay mechanics such as dismemberment to avoid having the game rated Z (Ages 18 and up only) by CERO. The game was directed by Tameem Antoniades, and its music was composed by Noisia and Combichrist. As Ninja Theory was not allowed to use Capcom's internal MT Framework engine, they had to build all assets from scratch using Unreal Engine 3.

The game was positioned as a reboot of the franchise, as the team wanted to re-examine who Dante is as a character. The team felt the need to revitalize the character with influences from popular culture such as "new music", "new ways of cinematography", and "new fashion". While the earliest version of the character was closer to his appearance in the first game, this was rejected by Capcom, which felt that they were too similar to fan art and wanted a drastic reinvention of Dante. The goal for Capcom was for Ninja Theory to reimagine Dante as a character from Hollywood movies. As a result, the team took inspiration from movies such as Fight Club and Jason Bourne, as well as "rebellious influences" such as The Sex Pistols, The Clash, James Dean, and Jack Kerouac. The team decided to explore the character's backstory, which was inspired by the TV show Dexter, chronicling how he copes with a traumatic childhood event. Art director Alessandro Taini described him as a "kid with a very strong look", and added that Capcom "really wanted to see from the eyes that he's a bad guy". Antoniades added that the team wanted to inject a sense of "youthful energy" into the character, while producer Alex Jones described him as a "rougher version" of the original Dante. Despite being an angry and dissatisfied outcast who has no respect for authority, Antoniades added that the character maintained the dark humor and wit found in previous games. Dante's hair was also black in colour, with the story focusing on his formative years. His costume was also designed to be less outlandish, so that he would fit into a contemporary setting. According to the team, Dante’s personality was written to mature as he learns to take responsibility and care for the people around him.

One of the core goals was to make combat more accessible. Director Hideaki Itsuno oversaw the project, aiding Ninja Theory in creating its combat system and making sure that it retained the essence of previous Devil May Cry games. While most of Dante's moveset was carried over from the older games, Ninja Theory made it easier for players to launch enemies into the air by mapping that option to one button, and added additional prompts to show players the timing of combos. The checkpoint system in the game was more generous. Capcom made bimonthly visits to Ninja Theory, and shared with them "theoretical explanations" in creating boss fights, such as promoting better player agility during these encounters. The game also overhauls the style ranking system by informing players what score each combo does in an effort to make it easier for new players to understand. The two studios occasionally clashed on enemy design, as Ninja Theory prioritized visual design over gameplay. According to Itsuno, the bar to entry for new users of DmC "is very low", but the game remained challenging, with Antoniades adding that the enemy AI will try to disrupt the player's fighting pattern if that pattern became too consistent. Limbo was designed to be oppressive. Its environment will actively distort itself to hinder Dante's progress, creating combat arenas that look more organic.

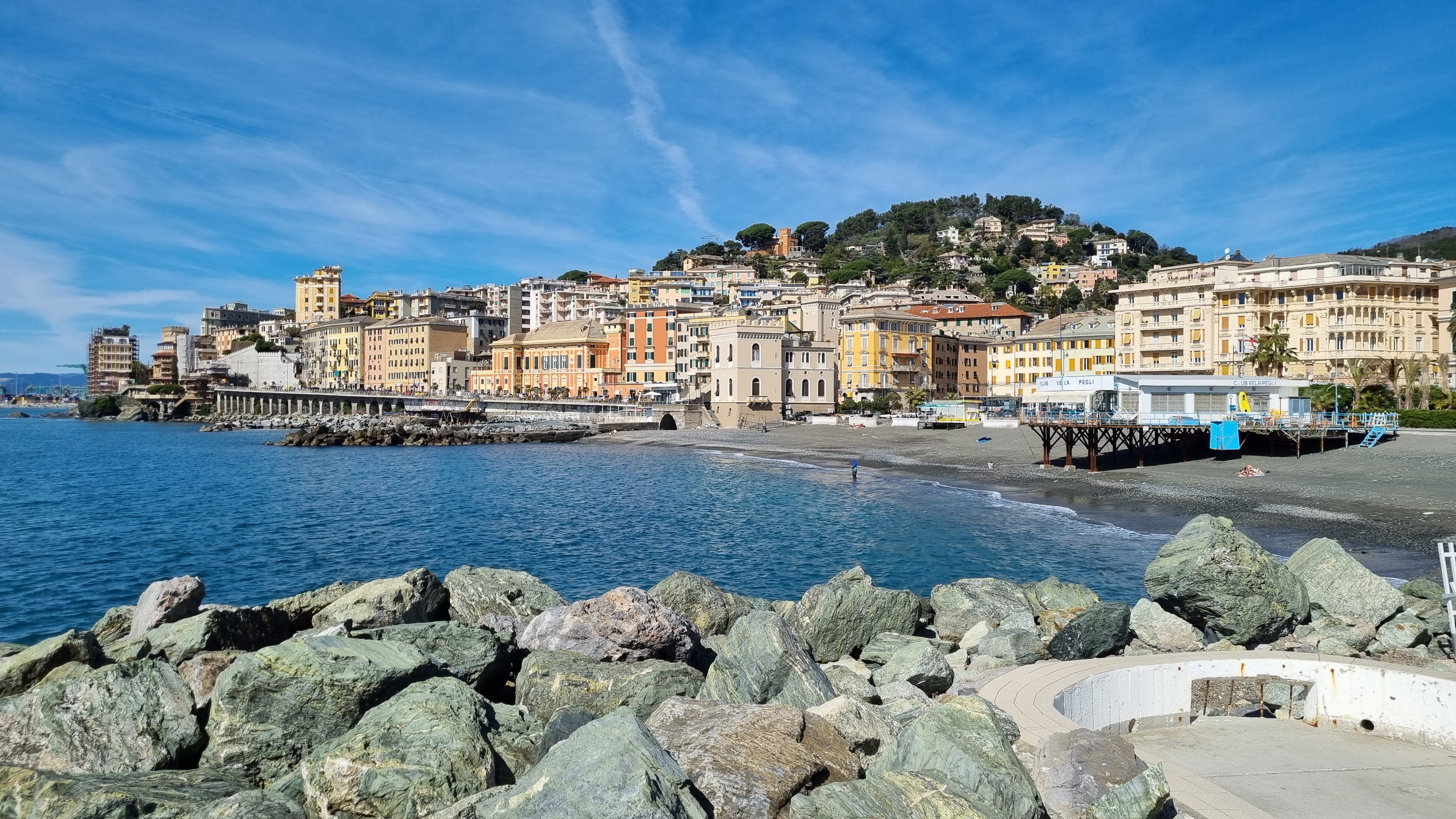
The design of Limbo City was inspired by Genoa, Italy.

Jones wrote that DmC had a more mature tone than its predecessors and compared it to Christopher Nolan's Batman movies. The main location of the game, Limbo City, was also a deviation from the franchise's traditional Gothic-styled settings. The city was inspired by Genoa, Italy, and it was designed to be a less fantastical and more grounded location. Its Romanesque architecture was inspired by that of Barcelona, Spain, the opening level was based on the Santa Monica Pier, while the nightclub was based on Berghain in Berlin. To give the city an urban feel, Ninja Theory recruited street artists to create artwork for the game. Setting the game in a metaphysical plane known as Limbo allowed Dante to fight demons in a closed-off arena while giving him opportunities to interact with characters in the real world. The antagonistic forces in the game were inspired by They Live, where the main characters can see the ideology behind advertisements. The story was positioned as a satire of modern society in which the populace is controlled by sinister institutions and fed with propaganda. Ninja Theory added that while the story commented on "the universal theme" of "the need to rebel as a means to achieve freedom", it was not reflective of the company's political stance, adding that the satire "shouldn’t be taken too seriously but it is a reflection of our times". Alex Garland served as the game's story consultant. Motion capture for characters in cutscenes was done at Giant Studios, while Ninja Theory handcrafted all of the game's fighting animations.

== Release ==
Dante's redesign from the original 2010 announcement from Tokyo Game Show 2010

In May 2010, early rumors suggested that Ninja Theory would be developing a new installment in the Devil May Cry franchise. The game was officially announced in September 2010 during the Tokyo Game Show. Early reception to the new design of Dante and the change in direction of the series was negative. The series' original creator, Hideki Kamiya, was also negative about the game's direction. The team had received numerous death threats in the form of comic books and metal songs due to the controversial decision to reboot the series. Capcom and Ninja Theory expected negativity from the fan base but did not anticipate its scale. As a result, while the core character design remained unchanged, Capcom released more gameplay videos of the game to change public opinion. The game was released for PlayStation 3 and Xbox 360 on 15 January 2013. The Windows version, developed by QLOC, was released on 25 January 2013.

A few days after the release of the game on Windows, the first "Costume Pack" downloadable content (DLC) was released for all consoles. The pack contains several outfits for Dante to use in the main game, which includes a Devil May Cry 3: Dante's Awakening outfit, a "Dark Dante" outfit, and a "Neo Dante" outfit. On 20 February 2013, the second DLC for the game, called Bloody Palace, was released. The free DLC is a survival mode, pitting players against 101 waves of enemies and bosses. Along with Bloody Palace, there is also a "Weapons Bundle" DLC, which includes three sets of skins (Bone, Gold, and Samurai) for the game's weapons and additional character perks. On 5 March 2013, the fourth DLC, Vergil's Downfall, was released. The DLC adds a new section in the main game, giving players a new single-player campaign featuring Vergil as the main character. It has its own leaderboard, stats, and set of achievements and trophies, and is available for free for those who have pre-ordered the game on PlayStation 3 and Xbox 360. American composer Jason Graves contributed "an hour's worth" of music for Vergil's Downfall.

On 17 March 2015, Capcom released DmC: Devil May Cry: Definitive Edition for PlayStation 4 and Xbox One. The remaster contains numerous new improvements and features such as a 1080p resolution and 60 FPS frame rate, rebalanced gameplay, all downloadable content available from the previous generation versions, and a new Bloody Palace mode for Vergil. It also introduces a Turbo Mode that gives a 20 percent boost to game speed, a Hardcore mode which increases the game's difficulty, a new difficulty level named "Gods Must Die" wherein enemies immediately use Devil Trigger and deal 2.5 times the normal damage, and a "Must Style" mode wherein enemies can only be damaged when the style rank is S and above. In addition, it also adds new costumes unavailable to the previous versions, updated trophies and achievements, new leaderboards for Hardcore mode, and an optional, manual lock-on system.

A two-issue comic series titled The Vergil Chronicles was released in 2013. Written by Guillaume Dorison, illustrated by Robin Recht and Patrick Pion, and published by Titan Comics, it serves as a prequel story to both Vergil and Kat. In June 2011, Screen Gems announced that it has purchased the rights to develop movies based on the game.

== Reception ==
=== Critical reception ===
Reception

Aggregate score
Aggregator	Score
Metacritic	PS3: 85/100; X360: 86/100; PC: 85/100; PS4: 83/100; XONE: 86/100

Review scores
Publication	Score
Eurogamer	8/10
Game Informer	9/10
GameSpot	8/10
GamesRadar+	4/5
IGN	PC/X360: 8.9/10; PS3: 8.5/10
Joystiq	4/5
PC Gamer (US)	83/100
Polygon	4/5

DmC: Devil May Cry received "generally favorable" reviews, according to review aggregator website Metacritic. It was nominated for "Action Game of the Year" at the 17th Annual D.I.C.E. Awards, and "British Game" at the 10th British Academy Games Awards, losing to BioShock Infinite and Grand Theft Auto V, respectively.

Nathan Brown from PC Gamer felt that the combat was stylish, applauding the game for combining the various fighting styles of Devil May Cry 3. Mark Walton from GameSpot enjoyed the fluidity of the combat system and described it as "rewarding". He also liked the varied enemies, which encourage players to adapt on the fly and fight tactically. The game's sense of progression was praised by reviewers, with Brown applauding the game patiently communicating its gameplay systems. Rich Stanton from Eurogamer liked the introduction of Angel and Devil weapons, noticing how they change the pace of combat without disrupting the overall flow. However, several reviewers disliked that some enemies are immune to certain weapons, which broke the flow of combat. Writing for Game Informer, Joe Juba was impressed with the ease of control despite the complexity of its combat. The platforming sections and boss fights were frequently criticized as one of the game's low points, for being mechanically uninteresting. Critics generally praised the added difficulty levels for presenting additional challenges. Ryan Taljonick, writing for GamesRadar+, concluded that the combat in the game, despite being slower and more generous than past installments, remained "challenging, accessible, and experimental in all the right ways". Both Walton and Jose Otero from IGN praised the remaster's transition from 30 to 60 frames per second for improving the combat, and liked the new gameplay additions for making the game a more challenging experience.

Walton deemed the story a significant improvement over its predecessors due to its mature tone, adding that it had "real moments of drama and excitement". He further described the characters in the game as "well-realized" and praised the performance of the game's cast. He also liked the game's pacing, noting that despite the story's linear nature, players were frequently presented with varied scenarios. However, he felt that the ending was predictable. Stanton strongly praised Dante's new design, characterization, and animation, adding that "with attitude in spades and a clutch of killer lines, there have been few better reinventions of a classic character than this". In contrast, Philip Kollar from Polygon described Dante as unlikeable, and wrote that the tone of the game was "deadpan and dopey", adding that its social commentary did not meaningfully evolve. Ryan Clements from IGN wrote that the story was "great" and praised its pacing, though he noted its overall runtime was short. Taljonick felt that the story was only serviceable, criticizing its predictable plot. The setting was also praised for being imaginative and visually stunning, and Ninja Theory was applauded for constantly introducing novel locations. Taljonick wrote that each area was "full of surprises" and that players would be impressed by how its static environments warped into deadly traps.

At launch, the game had been review bombed by players over its narrative and difficulty. After the game's release, Kamiya was more supportive of the title, adding that "DmC is a very unique title, and I honestly hope that people enjoy it". Mike Williams, writing for USgamer, wrote that despite the game's strengths, its narrative, art direction, and gameplay were too drastically different from what people traditionally associated with the franchise. Stanton wrote in 2015 that Dante was more interesting in DmC than in his previous appearances, praising the game's narrative for pushing Dante to be someone more than a stylish-looking player avatar. Writing in 2020, Elijah Beahm from The Escapist noted that the game's social commentary was unexpectedly relevant even seven years after its initial release. With the announcement of Devil May Cry 5, producer Matt Walker reiterated that while Capcom is returning to the original series, DmC remained as important as any of the other titles in the series.

=== Sales ===
Capcom initially hoped to ship 2 million copies by the end of its fiscal year; later, it revised its predictions to 1.2 million copies shipped. The game sold 116,000 units in its first week in Japan, becoming the best-selling game of the week. The game also reached the top spot in the UK's sales charts, though only mading a third of the sales of Devil May Cry 4. In the US, it debuted as the sixth best-selling video game. Capcom stated that the sales of the original game were "solid" but noted that the game did not catch Eastern gamers' attention and made less than its previous iteration, Devil May Cry 4. In September 2015, Capcom reported that the company was "very happy" with the sales of the Definitive Edition. As of September 2026, 3.6 million copies of the original version have been sold worldwide, while the Definitive Edition sold an additional 1.5 million copies, bringing the total of all versions sold to 5.1 million copies.

== Future ==
Capcom has stated that a sequel to DmC: Devil May Cry remains possible, though only if developed in partnership with Ninja Theory. Capcom representatives have also stated that the company has "no intention of erasing DmC from its history", though Ninja Theory's acquisition by Microsoft in 2018 has complicated prospects for a future sequel.

Although DmC: Devil May Cry exists as a reboot distinct from the original continuity of the series, members of Capcom's development team have acknowledged that the game influenced design choices in Devil May Cry 5, the next mainline game in the series. While the core combat system of Devil May Cry 5 remains grounded in the design philosophy of earlier titles, the game's adoption of more modern animation techniques, responsive control schemes, and a heightened cinematic aesthetic has been attributed in part to lessons learned during the development of DmC.
