= Enslaved: Odyssey to the West =

2010 video game

- Developer: Ninja Theory
- Publisher: Namco Bandai Games
- Director: Tameem Antoniades
- Producer: Mat Hart
- Designer: Mark Davies
- Artists: Stuart Adcock; Alessandro Taini
- Writers: Alex Garland; Tameem Antoniades
- Composer: Nitin Sawhney
- Engine: Unreal Engine 3
- Platforms: PlayStation 3; Xbox 360; Windows
- Release: PlayStation 3 & Xbox 360: NA: 5 October 2010; AU: 7 October 2010; EU: 8 October 2010; Windows; 25 October 2013
- Genre: Action-adventure
- Mode: Single-player

Enslaved: Odyssey to the West is a 2010 action-adventure game developed by Ninja Theory and published by Namco Bandai Games. As a loose adaptation of the Chinese novel Journey to the West, the game is set 150 years in a future post-apocalyptic world following a global war. Only remnants of humanity survive, along with the still active war machines left over from the conflict. The game's story follows Monkey who is forced to escort a girl named Trip home safely after they survive a ship crash. Players play as Monkey, who must combat enemies using his staff from a third-person perspective, engage in different platforming challenges and solve puzzles.

Initially pitched as a CGI film, Enslaved's development began after the teams had halted the development of a sequel to Heavenly Sword. TV series Life After People influenced world settings, while the video game Ico inspired the dynamics between the two protagonists. The team decided to shift away from the wuxia theme of the novel to science fiction as it was a genre many staff on the development team wanted to explore. Alex Garland was invited to write the game's story, eventually becoming involved in the game's design to ensure it was consistent throughout. Andy Serkis and Lindsey Shaw provided performance capture for the game, and Nitin Sawhney composed the soundtrack. The team used the Unreal Engine 3 game engine to power Enslaved.

Announced in 2009 as Enslaved, it was released on PlayStation 3 and Xbox 360 in October 2010. Enslaved: Odyssey to the West received generally positive reviews from critics, who praised its graphics, world design, Serkis' performance and Garland's script, while the game drew criticisms for its gameplay and technical shortcomings. The game was a commercial failure and sales failed to meet Namco Bandai's expectations. A single-player downloadable content, titled Pigsy's Perfect 10, was released in November 2010. A complete version, featuring all downloadable content, was released for PlayStation 3 and Windows on 25 October 2013. A sequel was planned but cancelled due to the game's financial underperformance.

== Gameplay ==
Monkey climbing the ruins while the status of Trip, waiting off-screen since she cannot scale such buildings, is displayed in the lower left corner

The player takes the role of "Monkey" in a third-person perspective, using a variety of combat moves and platforming skills to overcome obstacles. In combat, Monkey uses a staff that doubles as a close-combat and long-range projectile weapon. The staff has two types of long-range ammunition: orange power cylinders used for blast damage and blue cylinders for stunning foes. Monkey can also remain stationary and charge his staff to use the same stun attack. In the game, players encounter numerous mechs as enemies. Certain mechs can be used as weapons. Monkey can perform a finishing move on them when they are low on health, such as tearing the gun off a turret or throwing an explosive foe at other combat mechs. Monkey's other abilities include a force shield that can block a certain amount of damage before requiring a recharge, and the "Cloud" device that manifests as a hover board for gliding across water and land at great speeds. When enemies are defeated, they drop tech orbs used to upgrade Monkey's abilities. They allow the player to learn new moves and abilities for combat and devices, increase overall health and shields, and the damage that can be inflicted on enemies. Orbs can be found littered across levels, sometimes hidden out of sight, requiring extra exploration. Another type of collectible players can amass is masks, which are also scattered across different levels.

During the game Tripitaka ("Trip") who must be escorted and protected as they travel, accompanies Monkey. He has a device attached to his head linked to Trip. This device, called a slave headband in the game, requires Monkey to keep Trip alive. Should she die he will as well. In some instances just going too far away from her can result in the same fate. Trip can help Monkey overcome obstacles at times by performing technical skills like hacking into a computer. Players can command Trip to use her different skills like scanning the surrounding area revealing land mines or mechs on standby, and project a temporary hologram as a decoy to draw the enemy's attention. Players can also order Trip to hide behind covers or regroup with Monkey. Having no combat ability of her own, Trip is vulnerable to attacking enemies. Her only defense is an EMP blast, which she can use to temporarily stun enemies threatening her.

Other than combat, the gameplay focuses heavily on platforming where Monkey scales and leaps across the ruins throughout the world. Some areas and platforms will collapse shortly after use, requiring faster scaling before Monkey potentially falls to his death. Trip plays a part in the platforming sections of the gameplay, making them akin to puzzle-styled events. In other instances where Monkey makes jumps/climbs, Trip needs to be thrown to the other side or ride on his back. At times, Monkey and Trip are separated so the player cannot use her abilities.

== Plot ==
Enslaved is set 150 years in the future after a global war has ravaged the Earth, destroying most of the human race and leaving the world plagued by robots, known as "mechs", left over from the war. Mechs still follow their programming and seek to eradicate hostiles, now surviving humans.

The game opens with the main character, Monkey (Andy Serkis), awakening in a containment cell aboard a slave ship. He escapes and accidentally causes the vessel to crash. He reaches Trip (Lindsey Shaw) leaving the ship using an escape pod, but she ejects the pod without allowing him to enter. When Monkey regains consciousness after landing, he discovers Trip has placed a slave headband on him, which forces him to follow her orders; a Termination Trigger will kill him if she dies. Trip explains she wants to return to her village, and she needs his help to get there. Monkey is angry but has no other choice. As they travel across New York City, glitches in the headband expose Monkey to visions of what appears to be life before the war. When they reach Trip's village, however, they discover it was attacked and is now overrun with mechs. After clearing the village of them, Monkey and Trip discover Trip's father is dead, along with a large amount of other villagers. Assuming there are no survivors, Trip refuses to remove Monkey's headband, explaining her intent to find and kill the person responsible.

Trip takes Monkey to meet a friend of her father's named Pigsy (Richard Ridings), who she believes can help them. Pigsy explains that a nearby mech base is building a 'Leviathan', an enormous and incredibly powerful giant mech. The three infiltrate the base, commandeer Leviathan, and steer it to the mysterious Pyramid, where the slaves are being held. Along the way, Trip apologises to Monkey for breaking their deal and deactivates the headband, but Monkey tells her to turn it back on, hinting they have developed a romantic relationship.

When the Leviathan reaches Pyramid, they are confronted with several mechs. The Leviathan's main cannon fends them off for a while, but one eventually climbs aboard and tears the cannon off, forcing Monkey to destroy the mech himself. With the Leviathan now defenseless and surrounded, Pigsy announces that the only way for them to destroy the opposing mechs is for him to overload the engines. This would blow up the Leviathan and kill Pigsy in the process. Trip frantically tries to convince him not to, but Pigsy demands that Monkey take her away from the blast radius. Monkey and Trip get away just in time to watch the Leviathan explode, destroying all of Pyramid's mechs with it.

In the epilogue, Monkey and Trip enter Pyramid and discover the slaves are under the control of a single individual. The man introduces himself as Pyramid (Serkis) and explains that he lived before the war, and that he offers the slaves solace from the cruel world by sharing with them his memories of a happier era. He believes he is saving them and pleads with Monkey and Trip not to take away what he has given them. Monkey recognises the memories as the visions he has been seeing with the headband on. Pyramid shows Monkey what he has been giving the slaves through a mask. Monkey becomes enthralled with the images, but Trip violently disconnects and kills Pyramid, shutting down the system and freeing the slaves. The scene ends with Trip asking Monkey if she did the right thing, leaving those in the pyramid and their future unknown.

=== Pigsy's Perfect 10 ===
Set prior to the events of Enslaved, Pigsy lives a solitary life in the scrap yard with his only companion, a small flying robot named "Truffles" who helps him scout scraps and provides advice in combat. Because of his loneliness, Pigsy decides to build himself a friend. This will require three key components that he and Truffles must find in the scrap yard populated by mechs. While Truffles helps throughout his search, Pigsy seems unappreciative and prioritises his new creation. As Pigsy retrieves the last component, Truffles is damaged and shuts down in the process. With his new friend nearly complete, Pigsy learns what his creation actually needs is a "heart" and inserts Truffles inside. When activated, however, his creation runs amok before being gathered up by a salvaging mech. Pigsy gives chase and fights his way into the main scrap collector. When he finally retrieves Truffles and escapes, Pigsy realises Truffles was his real friend the entire time. Being greatly damaged, however, Truffles shuts down permanently. Pigsy realises too late he took his only friend for granted and vows not to make the same mistake again.

== Development ==
In August 2009, Namco Bandai announced they would be collaborating with Ninja Theory on a new video game project. The game, initially titled Enslaved, was announced in September 2010 for release on the Xbox 360 and PlayStation 3. Their previous project was the PlayStation 3 exclusive game Heavenly Sword. Tameem Antoniades acted as the game's director, actor Andy Serkis provided motion capture for the title, film director and producer Alex Garland served as the game's writer and designer, and Nitin Sawhney composed the game's score. Using only two-thirds of the budget of Heavenly Sword, the game's development was completed on 3 September 2010, and the game's publisher confirmed it had been declared gold, indicating it was being prepared for duplication and release.

=== Origin ===
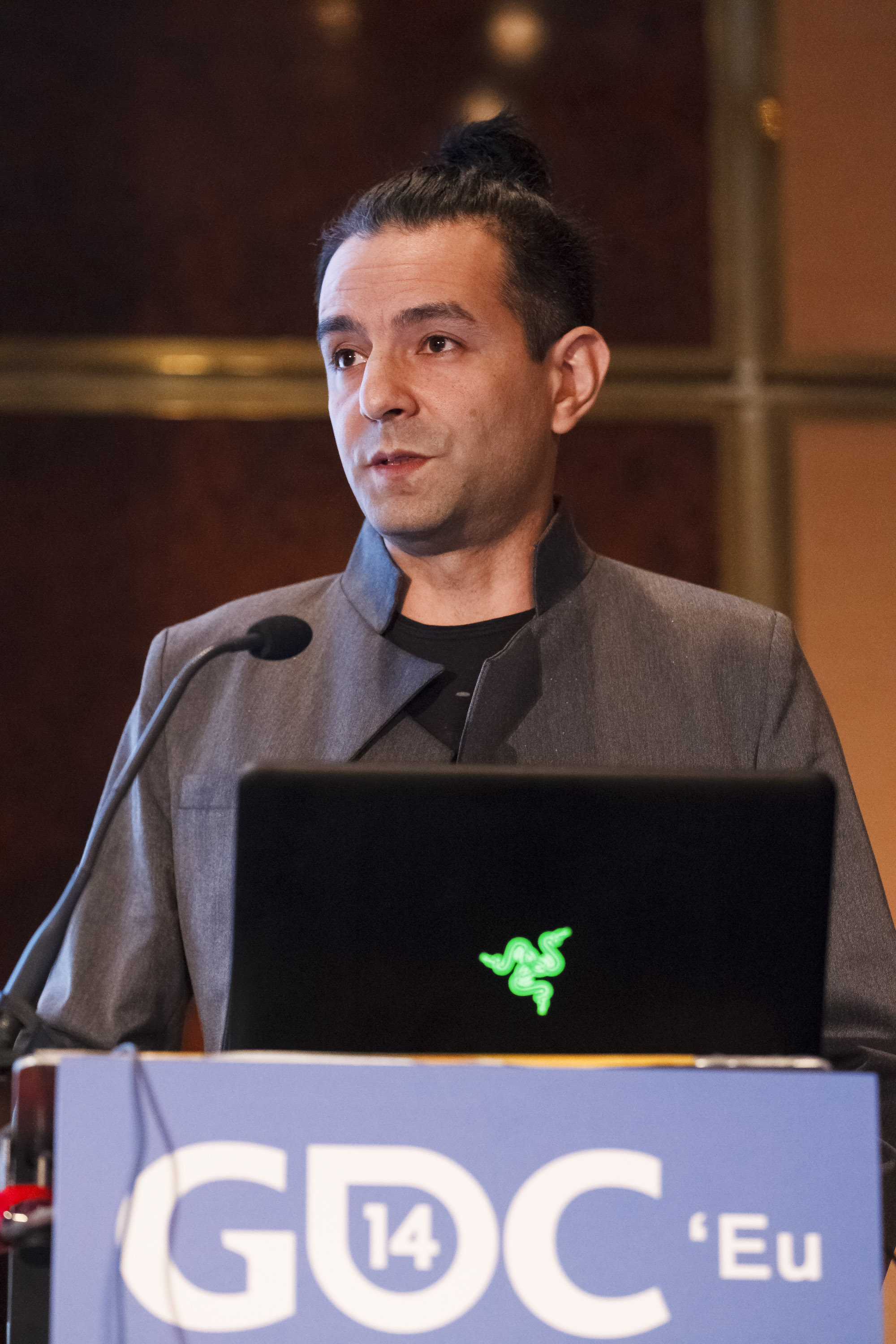
Tameem Antoniades served as the game's creative director.

After completing Heavenly Sword, Ninja Theory intended to develop a sequel but contractual terms with Sony Computer Entertainment forced them to halt the game's production. The studio decided to leave the title and all the technologies built for it to Sony and seek external funding from another publisher for their next project. This would eventually become Enslaved: Odyssey to the West, powered by Epic Games' Unreal Engine. Initially, Ninja Theory pitched the game to several Hollywood studios as a CGI film, but they were not interested in backing the project. The company dedicated three months to creating promotional materials to convince publishers to sign the game. A number of publishers were shown a detailed design document and a two-minute CGI trailer and the team received enthusiastic responses from them. Initially, they signed a deal with Green Screen, but the firm dissolved a month later. Namco Bandai Games later agreed to publish the game.

Mike Ball, CTO of Ninja Theory, revealed that the initial idea for the game came from Heavenly Sword, in particular, the relationship between the protagonist Nariko and her companion Kai. This relationship resonated with players, and the team wanted to repeat their success with a set of easily recognisable characters. During Heavenly Sword's development, Antoniades researched the wuxia genre and read the novel Journey to the West. He found the novel "epic" and compared it favourably to The Lord of the Rings. However, Enslaved is only a loose adaptation of the novel, with its characters loosely based on the novel's characters. The team decided to shift away from the wuxia theme to science fiction as it was a genre many staff on the development team wanted to explore. As a result, mechs replaced demons, and technology replaced magic. Initially, the game was set in a foreign world. The animations created by Hayao Miyazaki, whose works often integrate nature with steampunk, inspired the team. However, after watching Life After People, the team decided to set the game on Earth, one that was peaceful as nature reclaimed it after humanity's disappearance. A lot of colour, in particular red, was injected into the game's world to reflect this.

=== Writing ===
Antoniades wrote the game's early drafts. Andy Serkis was involved in the development of Enslaved from the beginning; Garland became involved six months later. Garland wrote the game's script and designed the cutscenes to ensure the transition between cutscene and gameplay was smooth. Garland agreed to collaborate with Ninja Theory as he was actively looking for a way to become involved in a video game production. The script itself was initially developed separately for a time, and then the gameplay developers joined to "mesh" both the story and gameplay. To achieve this a cinematologist was employed to teach editing, camera and film language techniques. These techniques and the use of music were used to make coherent transitions between cutscenes and gameplay.

One of the more important aspects of the script was the characterisation and interaction. The 2001 PlayStation 2 game Ico inspired the characters' relationships. Chief of development Nina Kristensen described protagonists Monkey and Trip as opposites at first whose relationship evolves as they learn to rely on each other in the hostile setting. Serkis helped create the game's characters. Trip's design went through several iterations. She was designed initially to look like a queen and have a pale appearance, so she would look "gothic". Tank Girl and Kai from Heavenly Sword inspired the second iteration of her character. She wore a costume that features the face of a character and had tattoos, which the team felt gave the character more personality and attitude. They tried to apply blue paint to Trip's hair, but found it unsuitable as it made her "too science fiction and punk". The initial design was deemed too "aggressive", so the team modified her design to make her look more delicate and fragile. Monkey has several design features. He wears a face paint, a reference to his counterpart in the Journey to the West novel, and a reflection of the character's tribal nature. Scars were added to his face to increase his sex appeal, while a cloth sash was used to replace Monkey's tail. According to Serkis, Monkey behaved like a "gruff hobo" in the game as opposed to being mischievous like he is in the novel. Monkey's hair was once designed as white, inspired by a picture of an albino gorilla.

According to Antoniades, Garland's initial script was very simple, and the dialogue was "reductive". This was part of Garland's intention to reduce the use of story exposition in favour of creating more drama in the script. The actors' body language and vocal cues delivered more of the game's information and plot than the direct use of cutscenes. Initial scripts featured two hours of the cutscene, but it was drastically cut and reduced to only one hour and 10 minutes. To facilitate this style of storytelling, Garland suggested that camera control be taken away from players during certain moments of the game, so they will be introduced to and become aware of the game's environments, which further help to clarify the game's story. This led to an internal debate within the company, with other gameplay designers fearing it would break the gameplay flow. This feature was kept in the game. Antoniades said in hindsight that such techniques "helped keep things exciting".

=== Design ===
Ninja Theory developed the gameplay to include more variety than their last projects, with the introduction of platforming sessions and puzzles. Players use different approaches to combat, such as stealth, to avoid combat altogether and use Trip's abilities to their advantage. According to Antoniades, the design choice behind this was to make portions of the gameplay more tactical, being at times "a puzzle game in disguise" outside the actual puzzle portions of gameplay. The combat itself had fewer combination-style attacks than most combat-heavy action games. It was more accessible and stream-lined while including the different abilities, equipment, enemy types, and scenarios requiring thought so as not to become too easy. Trip's involvement could not make her a "dead-weight" to the gameplay. Instead, her unique abilities are helpful, making her the "brains" while Monkey is the "brute". Some gameplay features were cut from the final game. For instance, a mechanic which allows players to break the circuitry of a mech in first-person by pressing buttons like a music game was cut because it was not well-implemented.

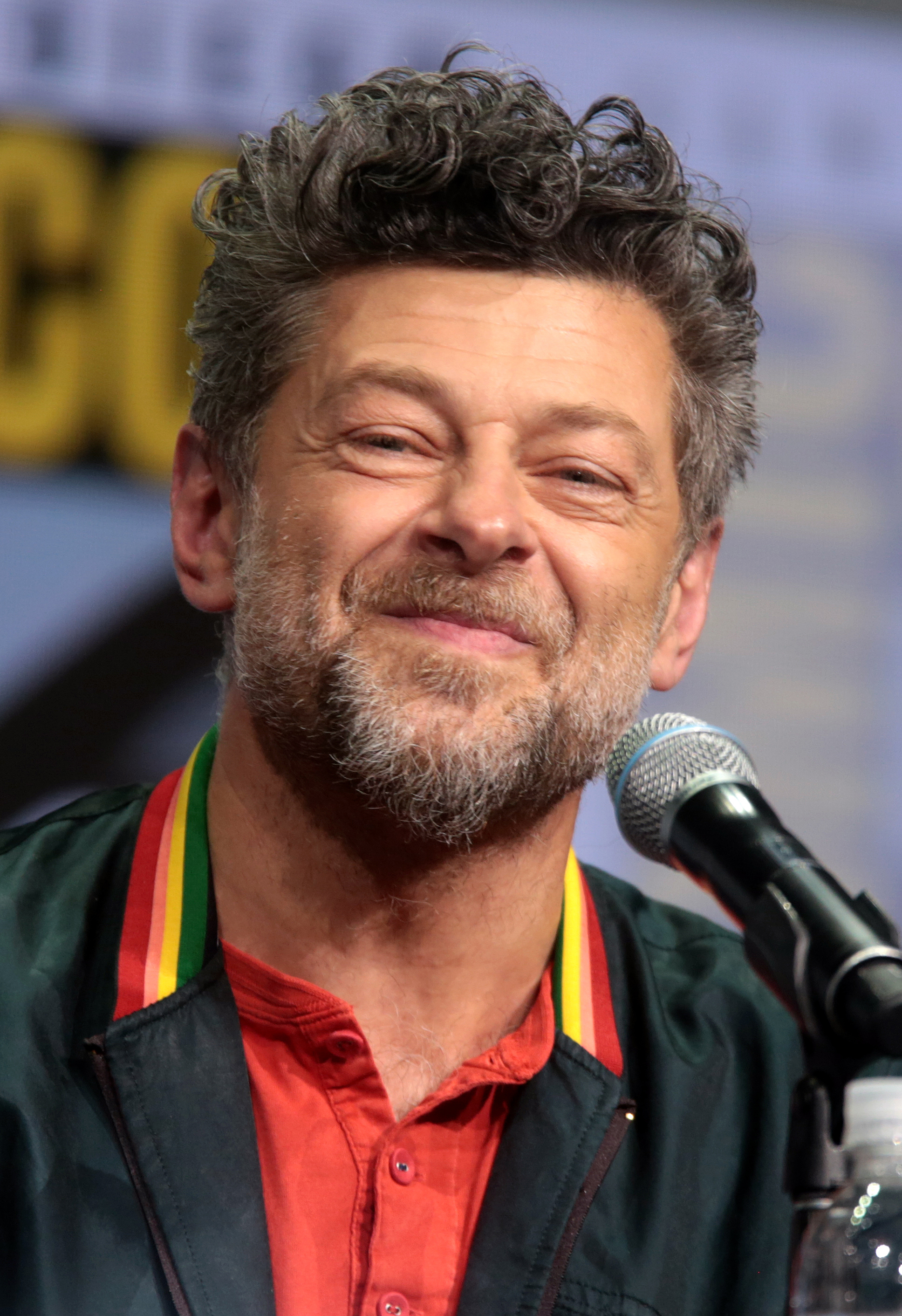
Andy Serkis portrayed Monkey in Enslaved: Odyssey of the West.

Serkis considered the use of motion capture to be akin to that in a film where it helps craft the story in a virtual world. The studio utilised motion capture in an effort to capture realistic human emotions. The technology itself was said to be advanced, even requiring a mathematician for the more complex portions of coding. Beyond facial animation, most of the motion capture was utilised prominently during the cutscenes as many of the actions within the gameplay itself were considered "physically impossible". Serkis felt that the motion capture also allowed for better dialogue performances since it allows the actors to immerse themselves in the story, become emotionally engaged, thus delivering better performances. Serkis and the performance capture team also used a physical theatre to deliver believable performances. Lindsey Shaw was selected from some 60 actresses to provide performance capture for Trip at a casting session held in Los Angeles.

Garland was also involved in the game's designs. He offered advice on the positioning of the game's camera to ensure that each battle scenes was more "impactful". The team modified Trip's idle pose in accordance with Garland's advice. Garland often challenged the game's design team. He demanded every object and environment detail featured in the game make sense within its world to ensure the title is consistent throughout. Garland questioned the placement of random items like forest paths and powered doors for their relevance. When the team chose to include random encounters with enemies, Garland insisted on adding story elements to ensure they flowed well with the game's narrative and that the combat encounter would be "a payoff". Antoniades described Garland as "intimidating" and found his approach to storytelling eye-opening. His high expectations caused the game's producers to fear the title would not ship on time. Because of Garland's extensive involvement in the game's design, he was credited as one of its co-designers.

Nitin Sawhney, who had collaborated with Ninja Theory on Heavenly Sword, served as the game's composer. According to Sawhney, the soundtrack's main theme was primarily based on "journey, transition and resolution", which also reflects the two protagonists' dynamic relationship. Sawhney's said his second collaboration with Ninja Theory was more fluid and smooth as he had more materials like an early script and animation to use as references, while he composed the score.

== Release ==
Before the game's release, Namco Bandai made a playable demo available over the Xbox Live and PlayStation Network on 21 September 2010. The demo features the first playable chapter of the game where Monkey escapes the crashing slave ship. Along with the standard edition of the game, various video game and general retailers offered exclusive extra content to those who pre-ordered it. In North America alone, there were five different versions from different retailers. EB Games Canada and GameStop offered a downloadable extra costume for Monkey called Ninja Monkey that came with "rare stun and plasma blast staff ammo". Walmart offered a "Classic Monkey" costume based on the original tale's protagonist and Best Buy offered a robot skin for Trip. Amazon offered the official soundtrack to the game while Target Corporation offered a miniature paperback comic.

In the UK, other retailers and websites like Game and Play.com offered similar bonuses. HMV released the Talent Pack, which came in exclusive presentation packaging and included the official soundtrack and a copy of Garland's novel The Tesseract. Across Europe, a Collector's Edition was also released that featured both the game's original soundtrack and a hardback art book. The game was released on PlayStation 3 and Xbox 360 on 5 and 8 October 2010 in North America and Europe. Namco Bandai released the game's Windows version on 25 October 2013. This version, also known as the Premium Edition, bundles the base game with the Pigsy's Perfect 10 downloadable content (DLC) and several character skins. It was also available for purchase via PlayStation Network.

=== Downloadable content ===
Pigsy's Perfect 10 is a downloadable expansion to Enslaved. It is a prequel to the main story where players take control of the character Pigsy. It is a side-story rather than being directly linked so as to not interfere with events in Enslaved. As well as the new chapters, the DLC also provides the option to display and play both the main game and the add-on in stereoscopic 3D. It uses the TriOviz for Games Technology which allows the game to display in three dimensions on 3D-HDTV set (via HDMI 1.3 or HDMI 1.4 connection) as well as on traditional 2D-HDTV sets with the Inficolor 3D glasses. The DLC was first released on both platforms on 23 November 2010. Several download codes for Pigsy's Perfect 10 malfunctioned, prompting Namco Bandai to issue an apology and code replacements.

Since the player takes the role of Pigsy, the gameplay has also changed because he is a different character and build than Monkey. While Pigsy can still climb over terrain, he cannot scale buildings as fast or athletically. Instead, he utilises a mechanical grappling hand attached to his own to reach higher places and swing over obstacles and large gaps. In combat, without the same fighting skills as Monkey, Pigsy wields a long-ranged rifle and grenades instead. Stealth is also a preferable approach to gameplay, sometimes requiring avoiding combat altogether.

== Reception ==
=== Critical reception ===
Reception

Aggregate score
Aggregator	Score
Metacritic	PS3: 80/100; X360: 82/100; PC: 70/100

Review scores
Publication	Score
Destructoid	9/10
Eurogamer	8/10
Game Informer	7.0/10
GameSpot	8/10
GamesRadar+	8/10
IGN	8.0/10
Joystiq	4.5/5

Enslaved: Odyssey to the West received "generally favorable" reviews from critics for the console versions, while the PC version received "mixed or average" reviews, according to review aggregator website Metacritic. It was also nominated at the Ivor Novello Award in the Best Original Video Game Score category. Garland and Antoniades won Best Game at the UK Writers Guild Award. During the 14th Annual Interactive Achievement Awards, Enslaved: Odyssey to the West received nominations for "Adventure Game of the Year", "Outstanding Character Performance" for Andy Serkis' portrayal of Monkey, and outstanding achievement in "Game Direction", "Animation", "Art Direction", and "Story".

James Stephanie Sterling of Destructoid praised the "stunning" graphics, and found the game's colorful environments refreshing to look at. They liked the performance artists' work, which they described as "wonderful", singling out Serkis' acting as the best of the entire cast. GameSpot's Tom McShea strongly commended the game's cutscenes, calling them "superbly made", and praised the game's reliance on character movements to tell a story rather than using dialogue. Matthew Keast of GamesRadar applauded the game's world for being original and imaginative, though he thought the title needed more time before release for further polishing. Eurogamer's Ellie Gibson praised the game's soundtrack, describing it as "impressive" and praising it for further elevating the gameplay experiences. Justin McElroy of Joystiq however, noted that the game had several technical issues, such as a low frame rate and occasionally clunky controls. IGN's Arthur Gies called the game's graphics "beautiful" with unique and distinct character designs. However, he shared McElroy's concern, saying there were several graphical glitches that slightly undermine the experience. Andrew Reiner of Game Informer also criticized the game's lack of polish, citing texture hiccups and camera issues as key problems.

Sterling called the relationship between Trip and Monkey believable and complex, and called the game's cast one of the best of the year. They also applauded the game's writing and dialogue and the story for smoothly integrating different elements from comedy to tragedy to action. McElroy praised Garland's writing, and compared it favorably to Uncharted 2: Among Thieves. He also liked the game's cast of characters and wanted to see more of them. McShea noted that the unlikely pairing of Trip and Monkey provided a great driving force for the story and enabled players to relate and connect to them. Reiner also praised the characters for being relatable, and commented on the protagonists' evolving relationship positively. Gibson called the game's opening hour clichéd and subpar, but he strongly praised Garland's script for avoiding needless exposition. Keast agreed, describing its approach to storytelling as "mature". Gies strongly praised the story for being believable and moving, noting that it was one of the best stories in any video game.

The game's combat was viewed positively by Sterling. They felt it is simple and satisfying, though they found the dodge mechanic for Monkey useless and that it created minor annoyances. They singled out the "Cloud" device as one of their favorite gameplay systems, though they lamented that there are not many opportunities to use it. McShea found the combat basic, requiring players to be constantly mashing buttons, though he enjoyed it for being "brutal" and "satisfying". He commended the developers for adding platforming sessions, boss fights and puzzles into the game to break up its pacing. Keast commented that the combat is more "tactical" and "methodical", though he noted that it was not as complex as other titles like God of War or Castlevania: Lords of Shadow. Gibson called the gameplay "solid", but she was disappointed by its lack of innovation and depth. Gies commented on the noticeable delay between players' input and in-game action. He felt the combat was not interesting and varied enough. Reiner agreed, writing that while the combat was visceral, it was neither deep nor interesting. Sterling, Reiner, Keast and Gibson were disappointed by the platforming sections' lack of challenges. Both Gibson and Keast criticised the game for handholding players excessively with different guides.

The PC port drew criticism by not updating the texture quality, barebones graphics options, stuttering, and the quality of mouse and keyboard controls.

=== Sales ===
Namco Bandai hoped they would sell over 1 million units of Enslaved: Odyssey to the West. The publisher revealed in November 2010 that the game only sold 800,000 units worldwide, but the figure was corrected to 460,000 in February 2011. By September 2011 sales of 730,000 had been achieved, but this was not considered substantial enough to warrant continuation of the franchise so a planned sequel was cancelled. Namco blamed the game's release in a crowded window as the key factor it is a commercial failure. In 2014, Tameem Antoniades stated, speaking of the game's poor sales, "I'm not sure if the fantasy elements were a turn-off, the gameplay mix, or the lack of visibility. It was probably a mix of all three".

=== Potential sequel ===
Tameem Antoniades was asked in April 2017 in a Game Informer interview about what he would like to do with potential sequels for DmC: Devil May Cry, Heavenly Sword, and Enslaved, with a mutual understanding between him and the interviewer that Ninja Theory no longer owns the IPs for those games and such a sequel would be decided by the publishers. In regards to Enslaved, he said the game was too similar to Guerrilla Games's 2017 video game Horizon Zero Dawn and that an Enslaved sequel would have to go in a different direction.
