= Phil Spencer (business executive) =

American business executive (born 1968)

- Spencer in 2015
- Born: January 12, 1968 (age 58); Ridgefield, Washington, U.S.
- Other name: P3 (gamertag)
- Education: University of Washington
- Occupation: Business executive
- Employer: Microsoft (1988–2026)
- Title: CEO of Microsoft Gaming (now Xbox) (2022–2026)
- Term: January 18, 2022 – February 23, 2026
- Predecessor: Don Mattrick
- Successor: Asha Sharma
- Children: 2
- Awards: D.I.C.E. Lifetime Achievement Award (2022)

Phil Spencer (born January 12, 1968) is an American business executive who was the CEO of Microsoft Gaming (now Xbox) from 2022 to 2026. Starting his career at Microsoft as an intern in 1988, Spencer has worked in various sectors within the company, including developing Microsoft's first CD-ROM-based titles. He joined the Xbox team in 2001, and in February 2026, Spencer announced his retirement from Microsoft, with Asha Sharma replacing him.

== Career ==
Spencer joined Microsoft in 1988 as an intern and has worked in a number of technical roles, leading the development of Microsoft's first CD-ROM-based titles (such as Encarta), development manager for Microsoft Money, and general manager of Microsoft's online and offline consumer productivity products including Microsoft Works and Microsoft Picture It! During his early time at Microsoft, he was known by other employees to be an avid gamer, playing games such as Ultima Online in the office.

With the launch of the Xbox in 2001, Spencer joined the Xbox team and served as general manager of Microsoft Game Studios EMEA, working with Microsoft's European developers and studios such as Lionhead Studios and Rare until 2008, when he became the general manager of Microsoft Studios, eventually becoming the studio's corporate vice president a year later. He has participated in Microsoft's E3 conferences since 2010, until E3's final iteration in 2021.

In late March 2014, Satya Nadella announced in a corporate e-mail that Spencer was to "lead the Xbox, Xbox Live, Groove Music and Movies & TV teams, and Microsoft Studios" as part of the Windows and Devices division.

In September 2017, Spencer was promoted to the Senior Leadership Team, gaining the title of Executive Vice President of Gaming and reporting directly to CEO Satya Nadella.

In 2018, Spencer delivered the keynote address at the 2018 DICE Summit and spoke at the 2018 Game Awards.

In January 2022, along with the announcement of Microsoft's intent to acquire Activision Blizzard, Spencer was promoted to the role of CEO of Microsoft Gaming.

After taking over both Xbox and the Gaming division, Spencer advocated for cross-platform play and has indicated his goals are no longer to move gamers from other platforms to Xbox. Spencer admitted that "We lost the worst generation to lose in the Xbox One generation, where everybody built their digital library of games", making it harder to win gamers over from other platforms. He launched key initiatives, such as reintroducing backward compatibility to the Xbox platform, the purchase of Mojang and Bethesda, the further development and support of Minecraft, the introduction of Xbox Game Pass, launching the Xbox Adaptive Controller, an increased focus on PC gaming, porting some Microsoft-published games to other platforms including the Nintendo Switch, the launch of xCloud, and increasing the number of first-party development studios.

Spencer received the Lifetime Achievement award at the 25th Annual D.I.C.E. Awards on February 24, 2022, and the Andrew Yoon Legend award at the New York Game Awards on January 17, 2023.

On February 20, 2026, Spencer's retirement from Microsoft was announced after 38 years at the company. His career at Microsoft was celebrated by leaders in the gaming industry following his announced retirement including Doug Bowser, Peter Moore and Reggie Fils-Aimé. The announcement of Spencer's retirement also prompted Sarah Bond's resignation as President of Xbox. In an email to Microsoft employees on his retirement, Spencer wrote that "Last fall, I shared with Satya that I was thinking about stepping back and starting the next chapter of my life". However, it was claimed by Greg Miller based on a source that Spencer's seemingly sudden departure was not planned. Spencer was replaced by Asha Sharma, an AI executive at Microsoft, as Executive Vice President and CEO of Microsoft Gaming.

=== Legacy ===
Phil Spencer's legacy is closely linked to a consistent reorientation of the Xbox brand toward a player- and service-oriented platform. A central pillar of his strategy was the introduction of Xbox Backward Compatibility in 2015. This initiative allowed users to play hundreds of titles from older console generations on new hardware, earning Spencer widespread praise across the industry for preserving video game history.

Furthermore, Spencer positioned Xbox as a driving force behind cross-platform play. Under his leadership, the Xbox ecosystem opened up to shared networks with PC, Nintendo, and eventually PlayStation, breaking down long-standing barriers in the gaming industry. These customer-friendly measures, along with his approachable demeanor, contributed significantly to rehabilitating the brand's damaged image after the launch of the Xbox One and permanently regaining the community's trust.

He also introduced Xbox Game Pass - now an industry standard for subscription gaming - and acquired major studios to boost Xbox's game output.

== Personal life ==
Spencer attended Ridgefield High School in Ridgefield, Washington, and then earned a bachelor's degree in technical and scientific communication from the University of Washington. Spencer lives in the Seattle area with his wife and two daughters.

As of 2016, Spencer was serving on the boards of the First Tee of Greater Seattle and the Entertainment Software Association.
