= Ninja Theory =

British video game developer

Ninja Theory Limited
- Formerly: Just Add Monsters Limited (2000–2004)
- Type: Subsidiary
- Industry: Video games
- Founded: March 2000; 26 years ago
- Founders: Tameem Antoniades; Nina Kristensen; Mike Ball
- Headquarters: Cambridge, England
- Key people: Dom Matthews (studio head)
- Products: Heavenly Sword; Enslaved: Odyssey to the West; Hellblade series
- Number of employees: 120 (2020)
- Parent: Argonaut Games; (2000–2004); Xbox Game Studios; (2018–present) (Note: Pending sale to an undisclosed buyer)
- Divisions: Senua Studio
- Website: ninjatheory.com

Ninja Theory Limited is a British video game developer based in Cambridge, England. Notable games it has developed include Kung Fu Chaos, Heavenly Sword, Enslaved: Odyssey to the West, DmC: Devil May Cry, and the Hellblade series.

Founded by Tameem Antoniades, Nina Kristensen and Mike Ball in March 2000, the company operated under the name Just Add Monsters. It was acquired by Argonaut Games soon after its founding and released Kung Fu Chaos for the original Xbox console. The company purchased itself from administrators after Argonaut Games was liquidated, but suffered from financial troubles. Sony Computer Entertainment saved the team from bankruptcy by funding the development of Heavenly Sword, which was an expensive project. The game's poor sales resulted in Ninja Theory losing all its in-house technologies because of contractual agreements with Sony. The team then moved on to develop Enslaved: Odyssey to the West, an underperforming project in collaboration with writer Alex Garland, and DmC: Devil May Cry, a reboot of Capcom's Devil May Cry series which, despite being praised for its gameplay, came under some scrutiny for its story and interpretation of returning characters.

The team began diversifying its portfolio of games and taking on contract work for publishers after finishing the development of DmC. It also entrusted a small team to develop its first self-published title, Hellblade: Senua's Sacrifice. The team developed a business model they called "Independent AAA", where the game would have a small budget while retaining high graphical fidelity. Exploring the theme of psychosis, the game was a commercial and critical success. In 2018, Ninja Theory was acquired by Microsoft and became a first-party developer under their Xbox Game Studios umbrella. In that period, the studio released the multiplayer title Bleeding Edge (2020), as well as a sequel to Senua's Sacrifice, Senua's Saga: Hellblade II (2024).

In June 2026, Xbox announced that it would part ways with Ninja Theory, aiming for the studio to be sold to a new investor while enabling them to finish their current project, a third Hellblade game titled Senua (2027) which would be published by Xbox Game Studios. However by September 2026, Xbox COO Matt Booty announced two attempts to sell Ninja Theory had failed, and that the studio could face closure as part of a wider restructuring of Xbox Game Studios.

== History ==
=== Just Add Monsters (2000–2004) ===
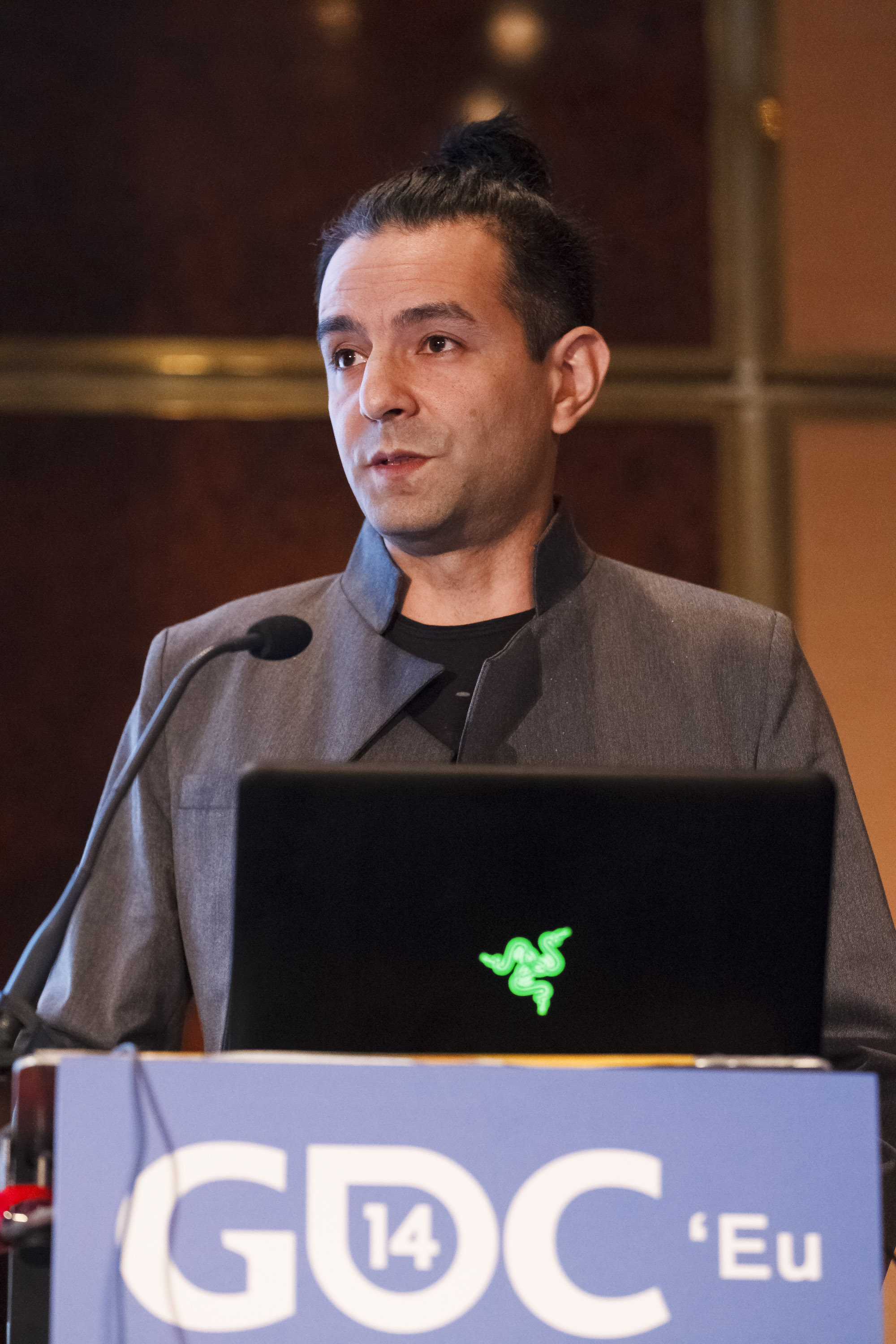
Tameem Antoniades is one of the company's founders.

Tameem Antoniades, Nina Kristensen and Mike Ball founded Just Add Monsters in March 2000 in Cambridge, England, with £3,000. At the time, the company had three staff but no money, equipment, or technology. Antoniades had ideas for a kung fu game and brainstormed them for a hack and slash multiplayer game called Kung Fu Chaos in his bedroom. As the team settled on the idea, they began actively looking for investment from major video game publishers, but none of them showed any interest in funding the game. Instead, they offered to buy the small company. As the team began to run out of money, they agreed to be acquired by Argonaut Games in September 2000.

With Argonaut's support and funding, the team was able to move into a proper office, hire 17 more staff and buy the technologies needed to make a video game. The development team assembled a gameplay demo of Kung Fu Chaos and presented it to Microsoft Games Studios. They were willing to provide funding for the development in order to have a strong line-up for their then-upcoming console, the Xbox. The publishing team at Microsoft was described as "helpful", aiding the team in refining the game during its production. However, Microsoft failed to market the game properly. For example, no advertisements were prepared for the launch. While the game was critically praised, Kung Fu Chaos' sales were hugely disappointing, and the game was a financial failure for the firm. At the time, Antoniades was disappointed and shocked that Microsoft would "send [the game] out to die", but understood Microsoft's decision to put their resources into other more profitable projects.

Before the release of Kung Fu Chaos, the team were already actively developing a sequel titled Kung Fu Chaos 2. The team used feedback from Kung Fu Chaos' players to make the sequel a more mature game. While the team expected the publishing relationship with Microsoft would continue, they declined to fund the sequel since the first game was not warmly welcomed by its audience. As Microsoft retained the intellectual property (IP) rights to Kung Fu Chaos, and the team did not have sufficient resources to start from scratch, and could not use the Xbox code they had programmed, the company ceased development of Kung Fu Chaos 2. Instead, they began working on a new IP, Kung Fu Story, which was also themed around kung fu and Chinese martial arts.

While developing Kung Fu Story, the team closely monitored the games market and realised that both the audience and publishers wanted games based on realism with high production values rather than those which have highly stylised visuals. Recognizing that Kung Fu Story would not fare well with the audience, the team decided to greatly expand the game's scope to satisfy players' demands. The team renamed the game Heavenly Sword, and assembled a demo using personal computers in an effort to estimate the possible capabilities of the unannounced seventh generation of video game consoles. Publishers were interested in funding the game, but they were reluctant to do so due to Argonaut's financial troubles, of which the team at Just Add Monsters was unaware. In October 2004, Argonaut entered administration. The team remortgaged their apartments and Argonaut's CEO, Jez San, provided investment to help the team to buy Just Add Monsters from the administrators. In November 2004, the team reestablished themselves as Ninja Theory, and the development of Heavenly Sword continued. Kristensen became the head of development, Antoniades led the design department, while Ball took charge of the technology team. San joined as a member of the firm's board of directors.

=== Heavenly Sword, Enslaved and DmC (2004–2013) ===
After the company was reestablished, it had very limited capital and could only sustain its operations for three months. At the time, the company employed more than 50 people. The team continued to present Heavenly Sword to various publishers, but their responses were unenthusiastic. Publishers questioned the team's ability to make a technology-intensive game because of its relatively small size. With few options remaining, the team signed a deal with Sony Computer Entertainment in May 2005. This saved the company from bankruptcy at the cost of IP and technology rights. The title would now become a PlayStation 3 exclusive. According to Antoniades, negotiating the deal with Sony was "soul-destroyingly difficult".

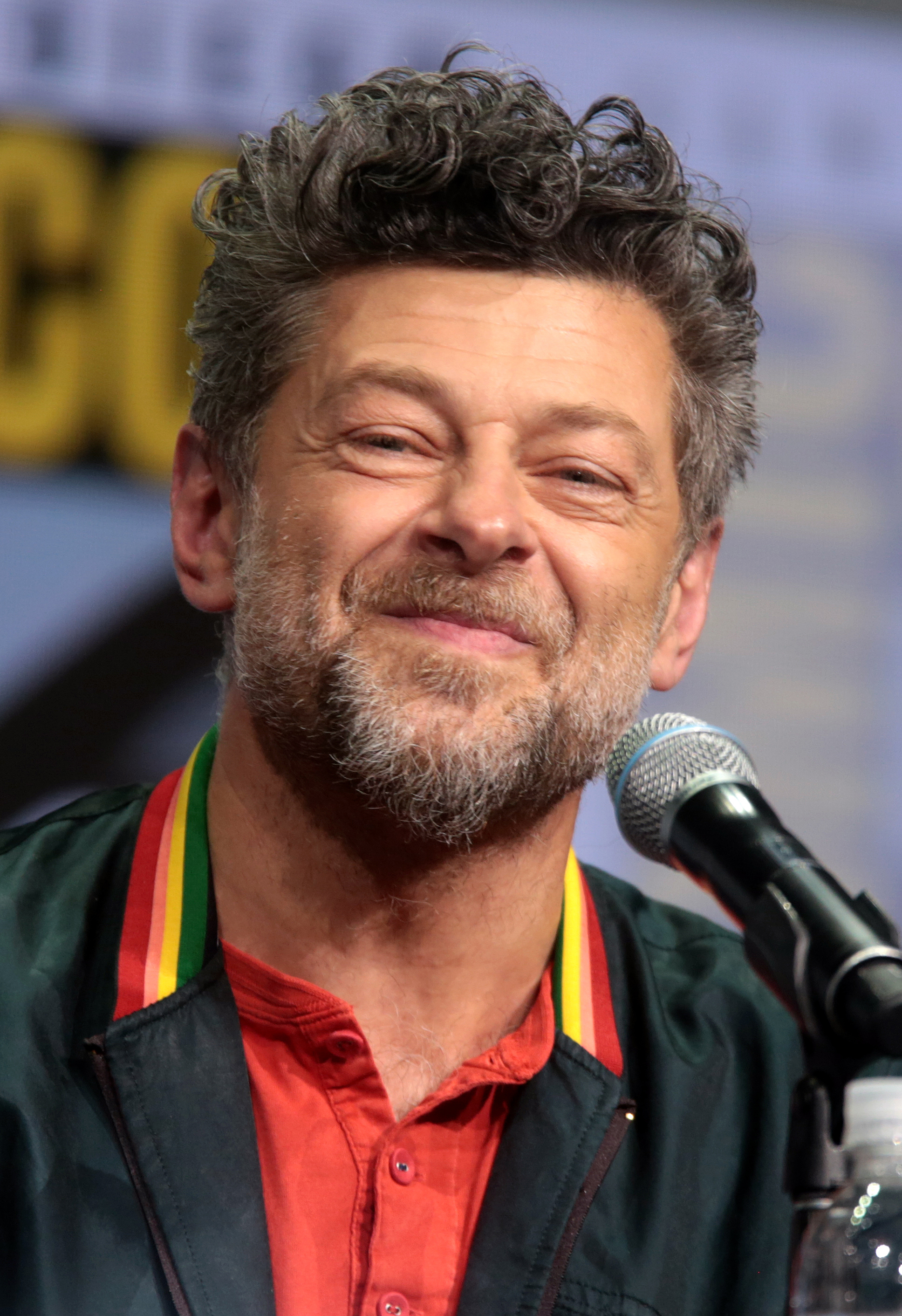
Andy Serkis served as the "dramatic director" for Heavenly Sword, and provided motion capture for both the game and Enslaved: Odyssey to the West.

Fueled by the ambition to be "a top studio in the world", Ninja Theory had noble goals for Heavenly Sword. With an estimated budget of $10 million to $20 million, Ninja Theory had a plan to develop the title into a multimedia franchise, ranging from a PlayStation Portable version to a film based on the story. The team also invested in performance capture, working with Weta Digital and Andy Serkis, who became the title's "dramatic director". The company employed more than 100 people to work on the game, which took four-and-a-half years to develop. Sony actively interfered with the development, diminishing the team's creative freedom. Sony pressured the team to produce a game that "fit in more with what a standard action-adventure video game should be". Many features were removed from the game during the final production stages to meet project deadlines. The game received generally positive reviews from critics when it was released in September 2007, and subsequently gained a cult following. However, sales did not meet expectations, and the title did not break even.

Ninja Theory then began making a sequel, but it had employed so many people to work on the title it did not fit with the "cost-analysis model of AAA production". Once the team engaged in the development of the sequel, it would become its only project; the company could not seek other opportunities. Not wanting to dissolve the entire team to work on the sequel, Ninja Theory decided to leave Heavenly Sword and all the technologies built for it to Sony and seek external funding from another publisher for its next project. According to Antoniades, it was a "heart-breaking moment".

While researching Heavenly Sword's wuxia theme, Antoniades read Journey to the West, which inspired the company's next game, Enslaved: Odyssey to the West. However, the team wanted to try something new, thus many of the fantasy and wuxia elements were shifted to sci-fi. Without its own technology, the team used Epic Games' Unreal Engine. Since Heavenly Sword had been unprofitable, Ninja Theory needed to present the new game to publishers as fast as possible because it did not have much reserve cash. It initially signed a deal with Green Screen, which dissolved a month later. Namco Bandai Games agreed to publish the game. Using only two-thirds of the budget of Heavenly Sword, the team hired Alex Garland to write the story. Antoniades found Garland "intimidating" to work with, though Garland considered the team "friendly". Garland often argued with Antoniades over the inclusion of boss fights, and became involved with the game's design. Andy Serkis returned to do motion capture, and Nitin Sawhney, composer for Heavenly Sword, returned to write Enslaved's music.

Enslaved was positively reviewed by critics when it was released in October 2010. However, like previous Ninja Theory projects, the market responded unenthusiastically, and it was a commercial failure. While Ninja Theory developed a piece of single-player downloadable content (DLC), titled Pigsy's Perfect 10, the multiplayer DLC that was in development was cancelled after the indifferent reception. Immediately after the completion of Enslaved: Odyssey to the West, publisher Capcom chose Ninja Theory to develop the next entry in the Devil May Cry series, as it was impressed by the company's past work, especially on Heavenly Sword. Capcom intentionally selected a western developer so that they could "add western flair to a traditionally Japanese-styled game", and granted the company plenty of creative freedom. Hideaki Itsuno supervised the entire project. The team came up with a new design for series' protagonist Dante, which generated backlash and criticism. Fans sent Ninja Theory death threats, of which some came in the form of comics and death metal songs. Antoniades responded to fan displeasure over the redesign by saying "The essence of Devil May Cry is all about 'cool'" and the design from the PS2 era "isn't cool anymore". Despite being a controversial project, DmC: Devil May Cry received critical acclaim when it was originally released in January 2013. It was a commercial success for Ninja Theory. The title reached the top of the United Kingdom, United States, European and Japanese retail software sales charts. For the first time, the team received royalties from a project. Heavenly Sword, Enslaved: Odyssey to the West and DmC: Devil May Cry collectively sold approximately 4.5 million units.

=== Independent AAA (2013–2018) ===
With the introduction of the eighth generation of video game consoles, Ninja Theory predicted there would be a rise in development costs, and publishers would become even more conservative when funding projects. As a result, the team decided to diversify its portfolio of games and split into smaller teams, working on various projects. The company collaborated with Chillingo to release a free-to-play mobile game named Fightback. According to Antoniades, Fightback was a learning experience for the studio as it explored the "games as a service" models, mobile technology, touch screen controls and realised the competitive nature of the mobile games market.

"We also pitched with Alex, a co-op story based game set in the real world with real characters only to be told that super heroes and space marines would sell better so 'why don't you set it on Mars?'. That was the end of that game."

— Tameem Antoniades, founder of Ninja Theory on a failed pitch

The company began experimenting with smaller titles, unsuccessfully pitching them to publishers. They pitched a horror game to Garland. Publishers asked for the addition of melee combat and then informed the team that neither horror nor melee combat was popular in the games market. Ninja Theory and Garland pitched another four-player cooperative gameplay experience set in the real world featuring real characters, but publishers insisted that sci-fi or fantasy elements be added to it so the game would sell. The company also experimented with a multiplayer-based melee-combat game. Publishers were reluctant to fund it as the project did not have a single-player component, the team was inexperienced and an action melee game was unlikely to be profitable.

In early 2013, the company tried to develop a game that suited publishers' requirements, while also remaining creative. The project, known as Razor, is a multiplayer game that mixes gunplay and melee combat. It features an extensive story and a boss that would have thousands of players fighting for months. It also has mobile control integration and missions that are procedurally generated. Publishers were initially keen on signing the project, but a game of a similar nature, Destiny from Bungie was announced, and most publishers opted not to compete with it directly. The team then partnered with a publisher to develop a project based on the Razor assets, but both sides terminated their agreement as the publisher interfered with Ninja Theory's creative freedom. The company partnered with Disney Interactive from 2014 to 2015, providing additional development and combat elements for Disney Infinity: Marvel Super Heroes and Disney Infinity 3.0. This helped sustain the company's operations.

The failure of Razor, and questions from Garland about why the gaming development scene did not have many independent projects similar to the independent film industry prompted the team to begin evaluating the idea of "independent AAA", where the team would own the intellectual property and publish the game themselves without mainstream game publishers. The game would still have high production values, but would be sold at a lower price. The team believed that there was "a middle ground between the low budget pure indie development and AAA [projects]". The team opted not to use Kickstarter having decided to fund it themselves. This led to the creation of Hellblade: Senua's Sacrifice, which had a team of only 15 people working on it. Since the game had a small budget, the studio did not promote the game heavily with advertisements instead creating numerous developer diaries for players who were interested in it. The team collaborated with several technology companies like 3Lateral, Cubic Motion and Xsens to help with motion capture, which allowed the actors to preview their performance while acting. In September 2016, Ninja Theory announced its Senua Studio division, which would work on real-time virtual character technology. As the game explored mental illness and psychosis, the company consulted professional neuroscientists and obtained financial backing from the Wellcome Trust. After a three-year development cycle Hellblade was a critical success when it launched in August 2017, with praise for its depiction of mental illnesses. The game was also a commercial success, becoming profitable within three months of its release, generating more than $13 million with sales exceeding 500,000 units. The game was nominated for nine awards and won five at the 14th British Academy Games Awards. Antoniades considered the critical acclaim validation that the independent AAA business model worked.

The company has several titles in development, both traditional and virtual reality projects. As for the future, Antoniades shared: "We've got other projects on the go, led by different team members who have their own personal slant on what they want to do, and they're not serious subjects, they are much more fun, traditional games if you like."

=== Acquisition by Microsoft (2018–2026) ===
On 10 June 2018, during E3 2018, Microsoft announced that they had entered into an agreement to acquire Ninja Theory alongside three other studios as part of Microsoft Studios. Studio creative director Tameem Antoniades said that it opted for the acquisition as "We want to be free from the AAA machine and make games focused on the experience, not around monetization", and would allow it to continue building smaller, risky games with creative independence. For Microsoft, Ninja Theory was seen as a studio that would produce good content which fits with the Xbox Game Pass subscription service, according to head of Microsoft Studios Matt Booty.

In October 2019, Ninja Theory announced the establishment of a research and development effort dealing with mental health, dubbed The Insight Project. The Insight Project builds upon and continues the co-operation between Ninja Theory and Paul Fletcher, a University of Cambridge psychiatrist and professor of health neuroscience who had consulted the studio on Hellblade. With The Insight Project, Ninja Theory plans to build smaller games to "help people identify and control negative emotions". At The Game Awards 2019, Ninja Theory announced Senua's Saga: Hellblade II for Xbox Series X.

The studio teased a new experimental game, Project: Mara in January 2020. Antoniades said that it "will be a real-world and grounded representation of true mental terror" and "will be based heavily on research, interviews, and firsthand accounts to recreate the horrors of the mind as accurately and believably as possible." In January 2026, Project: Mara was reported to have been canceled.

In April 2024, Polygon reported that co-founder and chief creative director Tameem Antoniades left Ninja Theory. He subsequently confirmed his departure on social media, expressing his desire to leave the company after the first Hellblade, but decided to stay for two more years to help with the transition.

In June 2026, Jason Schreier of Bloomberg News reported that multiple studios at Xbox Game Studios, including Ninja Theory, were in negotiations for independent buyouts and separation from the division to avoid being shuttered. The studio's third Hellblade game, Senua, was revealed that month at Microsoft's Xbox Games Showcase with a gameplay trailer, scheduled for a 2027 release. Stephen Totilo from Game File later wrote that since the Xbox division already planned to either part with or sunset the developer by the time of Senua's announcement, the trailer was intentionally placed in the Showcase as a means of attracting potential investors towards the title and Ninja Theory themselves so they may avoid closure. Later that month, it was confirmed that Ninja Theory was intended to be divested from Xbox Game Studios and sold to an unnamed investor, which would provide sufficient capital for completing Senua's development and initiating their next project.

On 22 September 2026, Microsoft announced a major restructuring of Xbox's first-party studios, with Ninja Theory one of the studios impacted. Xbox COO Matt Booty announced that two separate agreements to sell Ninja Theory to private investors had fallen through. While Microsoft is exploring other ways to keep Ninja Theory open, Booty raised the possibility of Ninja Theory being closed down by Microsoft. Reports of layoffs at the studio emerged in early October 2026.

== Philosophy ==
Ninja Theory's initial goal was to create a blockbuster title for major publishers, so it could gain a place in the triple-A gaming scene. However, the team slowly realised that the publisher model was restraining developers' creative vision, making the games more conservative and risk-averse. As a result, the team put forward the notion of the "independent AAA proposition" where the title would have a smaller budget and lower price point while retaining AAA production values. The developer would communicate directly with the player base without any publisher's help to get people to play early versions of the game and provide feedback. With the success of Hellblade, the company urged other small independent companies wanting to increase the production value of its games to adopt this new business model. Ninja Theory reiterated the company did not "hate" publishers, and that they would still be doing "work-for-hire, publisher work and original work" in the future.

Antoniades described creativity and narrative as "core" to the studio. The team emphasised story over gameplay, believing that if the story was well-written and intriguing, the quality of the gameplay would also improve since it would encourage people to continue playing. Antoniades added the team would only implement mechanics into a game that helped enhance the experience. Hellblade's permadeath system and its lack of heads up display were cited as examples.

== Games developed ==
Year	Title	Platform(s)
2003	Kung Fu Chaos	Xbox
2007	Heavenly Sword	PlayStation 3
2010	Enslaved: Odyssey to the West	Microsoft Windows, PlayStation 3, Xbox 360
2013	DmC: Devil May Cry	Microsoft Windows, PlayStation 3, Xbox 360
2013	Fightback	iOS, Android
2014	Disney Infinity: Marvel Super Heroes (Note: Additional work)	iOS, Microsoft Windows, PlayStation 3, PlayStation 4, PlayStation Vita, Wii U, Xbox 360, Xbox One
2015	DmC: Devil May Cry Definitive Edition	PlayStation 4, Xbox One
2015	Disney Infinity 3.0	Android, iOS, Microsoft Windows, PlayStation 3, PlayStation 4, Wii U, Xbox 360, Xbox One
2017	Dexed	Microsoft Windows, PlayStation 4
2017	Hellblade: Senua's Sacrifice	Microsoft Windows, PlayStation 4, Xbox One, Nintendo Switch, Xbox Series X/S, PlayStation 5
2018	Nicodemus: Demon of Evanishment	Location-based VR experience
2018	Hellblade: Senua's Sacrifice VR	Microsoft Windows
2019	A Star Wars VR Series: Vader Immortal – Episode I	Oculus Quest, Oculus Rift
2020	Bleeding Edge	Microsoft Windows, Xbox One
2024	Senua's Saga: Hellblade II	Microsoft Windows, Xbox Series X/S, PlayStation 5
2027	Senua	Microsoft Windows, Xbox Series X/S, PlayStation 5

=== Cancelled games ===
Year	Title	Platform(s)
2014	Razer	Microsoft Windows, PlayStation 4, Xbox One
2016	Disney Infinity 3.0 - Star Wars: Seeds of Rebellion expansion content	Android, iOS, Microsoft Windows, PlayStation 3, PlayStation 4, Wii U, Xbox 360, Xbox One
2026	Project Mara	—N/a
