= Xbox (division) =

Division of Microsoft focused on video games

- Logo used since 2026

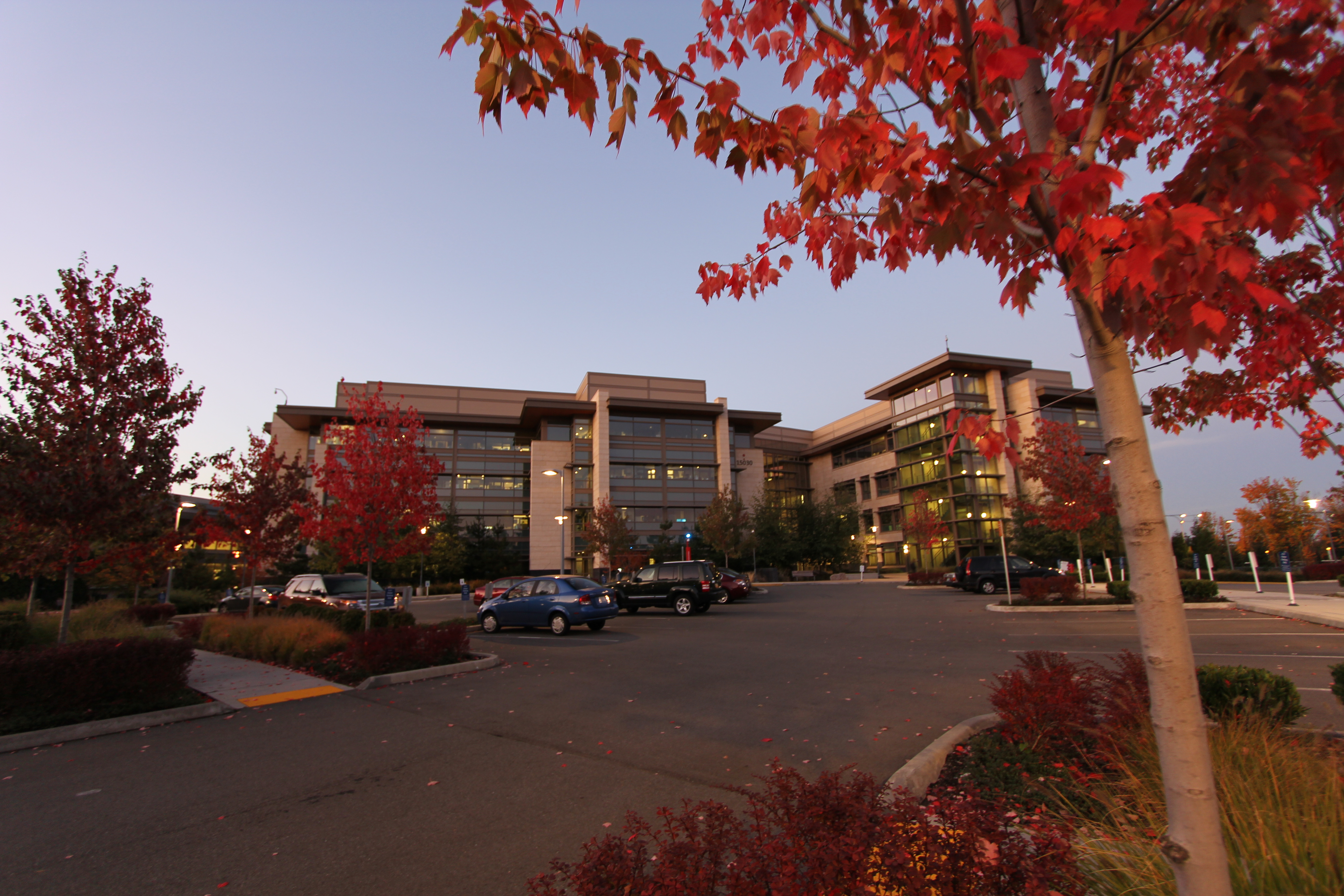
- Headquarters on the Microsoft campus in Redmond, Washington
- Formerly: Microsoft Gaming (2022–2026)
- Type: Division
- Industry: Video games
- Founded: January 18, 2022; 4 years ago
- Headquarters: One Microsoft Way, Redmond, Washington, US
- Area served: Worldwide
- Key people: Asha Sharma (EVP & CEO); Matt Booty (EVP & CCO)
- Products: See § Products
- Brands: Xbox
- Services: Xbox (app); Game Pass; Xbox Cloud Gaming; Xbox network; Battle.net; Microsoft Store
- Revenue: ▼US$21.8 billion (2026)
- Number of employees: 14,000 (2026)
- Parent: Microsoft
- Divisions: Xbox Game Studios; XP
- Subsidiaries: Activision Blizzard; King; Mojang Studios; ZeniMax Media
- Website: xbox.com

Xbox (formerly Microsoft Gaming) is the video game and digital entertainment division of Microsoft, an American multinational technology company based in Redmond, Washington. Established in 2022, it produces the namesake video game consoles and services, in addition to overseeing production and sales. Asha Sharma has served as the division's CEO since February 2026.

Its game development and publishing operations include Xbox Game Studios, Activision, Bethesda Softworks, Blizzard Entertainment, King, and Mojang Studios. Activision and Blizzard Entertainment are publishing labels of Activision Blizzard, while Bethesda Softworks is the publishing label of ZeniMax Media.

Prior to 2022, Microsoft had several different video game-related product lines, including Xbox hardware, Xbox operations, and game development studios. Microsoft Gaming was created with the announcement of Microsoft's plans to acquire Activision Blizzard to unify all of Microsoft's gaming groups within a single division.

With the completion of the Activision Blizzard acquisition in 2023, Microsoft became one of the largest gaming companies, the third-by revenue. The company employs approximately 14,000 people worldwide, making it one of the largest employers in the video game industry. The company has 100 million daily active players across all gaming platforms.

The division owns intellectual property for some of the most popular, best-selling, and highest-grossing media franchises of all time, including Call of Duty, Candy Crush, Warcraft, Halo, Minecraft, and The Elder Scrolls.

== History ==
=== Pre–Microsoft Gaming (2001–2021) ===
Xbox's logo and symbol used since 2005

Up through 2000, Microsoft had only a limited number of video game publishing efforts. With the announcement of the first Xbox in 2000 and its release in 2001, Microsoft established a division for internal development of video games for the Xbox and Windows, then known as Microsoft Game Studios (MGS). The Xbox hardware remained a separate division within Microsoft. After Steve Ballmer's departure as Microsoft's CEO, Microsoft investors attempted to exert pressure on the company to either sell or shut down its gaming business. However, these efforts did not gain significant traction. Microsoft's gaming division, including products such as the Xbox console, has remained a strategic focus for the company. Under the leadership of Satya Nadella, who assumed the role of CEO in 2014, Microsoft has continued to invest in and expand its presence in the gaming market. Since 2009, Microsoft's games operations, including Xbox division, are located at Microsoft West Campus.

MGS made some acquisitions of studios to help build out the Xbox software library over its first decade, including Bungie, Lionhead Studios, and Rare while establishing internal studios 343 Industries for Halo development and Turn 10 Studios for Forza games. In 2014, after Satya Nadella was promoted to CEO (combined with the ascension of Phil Spencer to head of Xbox), Microsoft embarked on a new acquisition strategy, starting with the acquisition of Mojang Studios, the developer of Minecraft, for $2.5 billion. Between 2014 and 2019, MGS also acquired several high-profile studios, including Ninja Theory, Playground Games, Obsidian Entertainment and inXile Entertainment. These acquisitions were aimed to help position MGS as the company's premier first-party development house comparable to PlayStation Studios for Sony.

Microsoft launched Xbox Game Pass in 2017, marking a pivotal year in which the company reevaluated its strategy to focus on a service-based business model rather than exclusive titles. This strategic shift allowed Microsoft to distinguish itself from other console manufacturers. By prioritizing a service-oriented business model with the Xbox Game Pass, Microsoft differentiated its approach from traditional console strategies that often relied heavily on exclusive game titles to attract users. Instead of competing solely based on exclusive content, Microsoft aimed to offer a broader value proposition to gamers through a subscription service that provided access to a vast library of games. In 2017, Spencer was named Executive Vice President, Gaming at Microsoft.

In 2019, as part of a larger branding, MGS was renamed to Xbox Game Studios (XGS) as to align with the Xbox hardware branding, and further acquired Double Fine. Microsoft acquired ZeniMax Media for $8.1 billion in 2020, the parent company of id Software, MachineGames, Arkane Studios, publisher Bethesda Softworks and others, to further expanding its portfolio of game development studios. ZeniMax remained a separate entity from XGS from its acquisition though overseen by Spencer.

=== Establishment and acquisition of Activision Blizzard (2022–2023) ===
Microsoft announced its proposed acquisition of Activision Blizzard for $68.7 billion in cash on January 18, 2022. Simultaneously, Microsoft announced that Xbox Game Studios, ZeniMax Media and Activision Blizzard would fall under Microsoft Gaming, Microsoft's newly formed gaming division. Microsoft Gaming CEO Phil Spencer stated that one of the primary reasons for acquiring Activision Blizzard is to enter the mobile gaming market. Meanwhile, Activision Blizzard CEO Bobby Kotick mentioned that they accepted the offer to access more talent, capitalize on the growing demand in the gaming industry, and to compete with rising gaming companies from China and Japan. Microsoft Gaming has entered into several 10-year agreements with gaming companies including Sony, Nintendo, Nvidia, Boosteroid, Ubitus, Nware, and EE, to bring Call of Duty to their respective platforms over the next decade. Additionally, Microsoft Gaming sold Activision Blizzard's cloud gaming rights to Ubisoft for 15 years due to regulatory pressure from the acquisition of Activision Blizzard. After several regulatory challenges, the deal was closed on October 13, 2023. The total cost of the acquisition amounted to $75.4 billion. This made Microsoft the third largest publisher of video games after Tencent and Sony Interactive Entertainment. On the day the acquisition was announced, Phil Spencer formed the Microsoft Gaming business, taking over as CEO, while Matt Booty headed Xbox Game Studios. Spencer's role includes all Microsoft's global interactive entertainment business across all devices and services. In 2022, ZeniMax Media, acquired Nemesys Games, a Hungarian video game development studio. Following the acquisition, Nemesys Games was officially renamed to ZeniMax Online Studios Hungary.

Shortly after completion of the Activision Blizzard acquisition, Microsoft further reorganized Microsoft Gaming. In this move, the Xbox hardware line was brought into Microsoft Gaming led by Sarah Bond. Matt Booty was made president of game content and studios, which includes oversight of Xbox Game Studios and ZeniMax Media, while Activision Blizzard also remained directly under Spencer, with Bobby Kotick remaining as CEO until the start of 2024 to help with the transition. In an email sent to employees, Bobby Kotick announced that he would leave the Activision Blizzard on December 29, 2023.

Following Bobby Kotick's departure, Activision Blizzard has undergone organizational changes to realign with Microsoft Gaming. Vice Chairman of Activision Blizzard, Thomas Tippl; President of Activision, Rob Kostich; President of Blizzard Entertainment, Mike Ybarra; and President of King, Tjodolf Sommestad, have begun reporting to Matt Booty, President of Game Content and Studios. The leadership teams at Activision, Blizzard Entertainment, and King remained unchanged. CCO Lulu Meservey departed Activision Blizzard on January 31, 2024. After assisting with the transition, Thomas Tippl, along with several other top Activision Blizzard executives, departed from the company in March 2024.

Microsoft Gaming laid off 1,900 staff (approximately 8% of its workforce) in January 2024. Additionally, Blizzard's president Mike Ybarra and Blizzard's co-founder and chief design officer Allen Adham left the company. Blizzard Entertainment reportedly is the organization that is most affected by layoffs. Project Odyssey, a game that Blizzard Entertainment has reportedly been working on for six years, has been cancelled. Toys for Bob and Sledgehammer Games reportedly lost over 30% of their staff due to layoffs. Microsoft Gaming also reportedly laid off the entire internal customer support team of Activision Blizzard and the team dedicated to bringing Xbox games to physical retail. Johanna Faries, the former general manager of the Call of Duty franchise, officially took on the role of the new president of Blizzard Entertainment on January 29, 2024, commencing her position on February 5. Simultaneously, Matt Cox assumed the position of the new general manager of the Call of Duty franchise. In February, Toys for Bob's office closed, and employees would work remotely.

=== Multiplatform strategy (2024–2025) ===
Rumors in early February 2024 suggested that Microsoft was looking to bring its first-party exclusives to either PlayStation 5 or Nintendo Switch, and that Microsoft may be leaving the hardware business. A special Official Xbox Podcast was held on February 15, 2024 with Spencer, Bond, and Booty, discussing that Microsoft Gaming was looking to release some of its first-party titles on other consoles. Spencer said that one of the reasons for this decision is to grow the Microsoft Gaming franchises, and he anticipates that in the next 5–10 years, console-exclusive games would be a smaller part of the gaming industry. In the months that followed, Spencer said that the gaming industry was undergoing changes in the methods by which games were developed and distributed, and that Microsoft was prepared to anticipate when considering a more aggressive multiplatform strategy. By the end of 2024, Microsoft Gaming launched a new advertising campaign titled "This is an Xbox", intent on showcasing the various compatible devices that can access Xbox games and services beyond the traditional consoles, such as Windows PCs, Samsung Smart TV sets, and streaming devices like Amazon Fire TV through cloud streaming. Xbox Senior Marketing Director Craig McNary stated that the campaign's message was to illustrate "the evolution of Xbox as a platform that extends across devices," thus being evocative of a future where their games and content are accessible on a variety of hardware and software. Spencer also said that Microsoft Gaming would support the Nintendo Switch 2 following that console's announcement in January 2025.

First-party games that were launched for non-Xbox consoles during 2024 included Pentiment and Grounded for PlayStation 4, PlayStation 5 and Nintendo Switch, as well as Hi-Fi Rush and Sea of Thieves for PlayStation 5. Other games released for additional consoles during 2025 include PlayStation 5 ports of Age of Mythology: Retold, Indiana Jones and the Great Circle, Forza Horizon 5, Age of Empires II: Definitive Edition, Senua's Saga: Hellblade II, Age of Empires IV, and Microsoft Flight Simulator 2024. Microsoft accelerated their strategy as an agnostic publisher throughout this year, as The Elder Scrolls IV: Oblivion Remastered, Doom: The Dark Ages, Tony Hawk's Pro Skater 3 + 4, Gears of War Reloaded, Ninja Gaiden 4, The Outer Worlds 2 and Fallout 4 - Anniversary Edition all launched on PlayStation 5 simultaneously with Xbox and PC, while Pro Skater 3 + 4 launched for both Nintendo Switch and Nintendo Switch 2. Microsoft's publishing strategy across multiple platforms would continue in 2026, including PlayStation 5 ports of Avowed, South of Midnight, Starfield, and Forza Horizon 6 alongside Nintendo Switch 2 ports of South of Midnight, Indiana Jones and the Great Circle, The Elder Scrolls IV: Oblivion Remastered and Fallout 4 - Anniversary Edition as well as PlayStation VR2 support for Microsoft Flight Simulator 2024. In addition, Towerborne, Kiln, Halo: Campaign Evolved, Fable and Minecraft Dungeons II are scheduled to launch day and date on PlayStation 5 with Xbox and PC, while Minecraft Dungeons II would also launch on Nintendo Switch and Nintendo Switch 2. The Great Circle, which was initially planned as a console exclusive for Xbox Series X/S, was amended to include launches for other consoles following its Xbox and PC release in December 2024, which Spencer said resulted from the positive reception to the prior four Xbox titles released on other platforms in the earlier half of 2024, in addition to a need to maintain a strong business and interest in their franchises as they work to grow the Xbox ecosystem.

Other first-party games in Microsoft's portfolio, including Starfield, are not expected to retain platform exclusivity, as Spencer expressed that Microsoft Gaming desired to take games where new players could potentially be accumulated. Despite the shift to agnostic games publishing, Spencer maintained that Xbox hardware remains a key component of Microsoft's gaming business, and that they intended to compete on console features as opposed to exclusive software. Spencer elaborated on the strategy in February 2025, stating that due to player investment in libraries on other platforms, Microsoft was no longer attempting to move prospective users towards Xbox, instead concluding that multiplatform distribution enabled the publisher to build a better games portfolio. In January 2026, head of Xbox Game Studios Craig Duncan explained that multiple factors during development are considered when deciding which first-party games are made available on other consoles from launch, such as the resources available to studios and initial production plans not factoring other platforms, but that day-and-date release cadences for PlayStation and Nintendo versions of their titles would be more consistent going forward. Beginning with the Xbox Developer Direct in January 2025, Microsoft Gaming presentations advertised the availability of their first-party titles on PlayStation and Nintendo consoles.

Activision developer Toys for Bob left Microsoft on agreeable terms in February 2024 to become an independent studio, and signed a publishing agreement for their next title with Microsoft in May 2024.

On April 9, 2024, Microsoft Gaming and NetEase Games announced an agreement to bring Blizzard Entertainment games back to China. Previously, Blizzard terminated a publishing deal with NetEase in 2022. Microsoft Gaming also revealed plans to bolster their collaboration through a strategic partnership focused on expanding the availability of NetEase video games across various Microsoft Gaming platforms.

Microsoft Gaming shut down three development studios on May 7, 2024: Alpha Dog Games in Canada, Arkane Austin in the US, and Tango Gameworks in Japan. Additionally, Roundhouse Studios merged with ZeniMax Online Studios in the US. According to Microsoft Gaming, this move is a part of a larger "reprioritization of titles and resources" that Microsoft's gaming division is carrying out. The intention is to boost investment in their library of games and new intellectual assets while focusing on high-impact titles. Some teams have been reassigned to other projects inside Bethesda and ZeniMax, and production on some games has stopped as a result of these companies closing.

Jerret West, Xbox's chief marketing officer, left Microsoft Gaming at the end of June 2024. West led the marketing efforts for the Xbox Series X/S consoles and his team was responsible for developing marketing plans for games, hardware, and Xbox Game Pass. Following his departure, Microsoft is reorganizing some of its marketing teams. A new, expanded central gaming marketing team is set to be created under Kirsten Ward, VP of Xbox integrated marketing. Consequently, games marketing would become a part of the game content and studios division led by Matt Booty, while Xbox marketing, led by Chris Lee, would move to the Xbox organization and report to Xbox president Sarah Bond.

On August 7, 2024, Krafton reached an agreement with Microsoft Gaming to acquire Tango Gameworks as well as the Hi-Fi Rush IP.

In September 2024, Spencer announced another round of layoffs affecting 650 staffers in "corporate and supporting functions" following the acquisition of Activision Blizzard. In an interview with Bloomberg News in November 2024, Phil Spencer expressed a desire to continue acquiring studios, specifically taking interest in Chinese developers and partnerships with mobile game publishers similar to their relationship with Tencent Games, whom they collaborated with to produce Age of Empires Mobile. Spencer also confirmed that the company was prototyping a possible handheld Xbox console, though stressed that "such a device is a few years out." Spencer commented on Microsoft Gaming's efforts to establish a first-party Xbox storefront for mobile devices amidst ongoing conflicts with platform holders such as Apple Inc. and Alphabet Inc., who respectively control the App Store and Google Play, saying that he envisions an environment where such companies are more open to hosting Xbox's content in co-existence with their marketplaces.

Microsoft Gaming introduced Muse, a world and human action generative AI model trained to generate gameplay snippets and controller actions, developed by the Microsoft Research team in Cambridge, UK, in collaboration with Ninja Theory, in February 2025. Muse generates low-resolution gameplay clips (300x180, 10 frames per second) and responds to real-time interactions, including controller actions and in-game elements like power cells. Microsoft demonstrated the technology using Ninja Theory's 2020 game Bleeding Edge. Nadella said that Microsoft plans to build Muse's engine from their library of games as well as testing games developed with help of Muse.

On May 1, 2025, Microsoft Gaming announced that video game prices would increase to $80 USD by the end of the year, marking the first major price hike since 2020. Later that month, a Windows Central report detailed that Microsoft had internally de-prioritized plans for their first-party Xbox handheld console, originally scheduled for 2027, to focus on improving the gaming performance on Windows 11 and leverage collaborations with third-party partners on Xbox-branded handheld PCs, such as "Project Keenan" developed by Asus. The Verge later reported in June that the first-party Xbox handheld had been canceled behind-the-scenes to allocate more resources towards further developing the Xbox software platform and third-party devices. The Asus project was revealed in the June 2025 Xbox Games Showcase as the ROG Xbox Ally and a higher-end model, the ROG Xbox Ally X, a pair of Xbox-branded variants for the existing Asus ROG Ally and ROG Ally X handheld PCs. Both units run on a custom version of Windows with support for Xbox Game Pass, Xbox Cloud, Remote Play, supported Play Anywhere titles, and access to other PC stores such as Steam, Epic Games Store and Battle.net. During The Outer Worlds 2 Direct segment following the Xbox Games Showcase, Microsoft also announced that the title would be the first game to be priced at $79.99 USD from Xbox Game Studios.

Microsoft Gaming and AMD jointly announced the development of Xbox's next generation of hardware in June 2025, which would entail a "portfolio" of devices aimed at delivering deeper gameplay and visual experiences leveraging the use of artificial intelligence (AI) processes, while also encompassing a first-party platform that would not be tied to a single digital storefront and a ubiquitous experience across consoles, handhelds, PC and cloud. The hardware lineup includes the console successors to Xbox Series X/S, which would support full backwards compatibility with existing Xbox games, as well as custom silicon from AMD which would be applied to a variety of platforms beyond Xbox consoles. That same month, it was reported that Microsoft would perform a fourth round of major layoffs within its Xbox division as part of a company-wide reorganization effort ahead of the new financial year, primarily focusing on Xbox distribution across Central Europe, and the ceasing of adjacent operations in certain regions worldwide.

Microsoft Gaming performed a reorganization of their business on July 2, coinciding with the company's larger culling of roughly 9,000 employees across all their divisions. 2,000 Microsoft Gaming affiliates were let go in this restructuring, which included layoffs at Xbox Game Studios developers Turn 10 Studios, Compulsion Games, Undead Labs and Halo Studios of varying capacities; Turn 10, who created and developed the Forza Motorsport series, was reported to have lost nearly half of its current workforce, and had been anticipated to be reformed as a support studio for Motorsport's sister series Forza Horizon, according to former content coordinator Fred Russell. Layoffs additionally took place across various Activision studios, including Call of Duty support teams Sledgehammer Games and High Moon Studios, as well as Call of Duty: Black Ops 7 developer Raven Software; The developers of the mobile title Warcraft Rumble were collectively let go at Blizzard Entertainment as support for the game ceased, and a further 200 people were reportedly dismissed from King. The restructuring also included the cancelation of Everwild from Rare, and the Perfect Dark reboot, the latter of which also resulted in developer The Initiative's closure. Multiple unannounced game projects, including an untitled MMORPG developed by ZeniMax Online Studios and planned to succeed The Elder Scrolls Online, were also canceled. Microsoft ceased funding for undisclosed second-party titles from external developers they were attached to publish, including a first-person shooter game from Romero Games intended to be released through Bethesda Softworks, and Contraband from Avalanche Studios, the latter of which resulted in the closure of the developer's UK studio. In addition, ZeniMax Online studio director Matt Firor left Microsoft following the shuttering of the studio's project, with Firor being succeeded by Joesph Burba as studio director. The Verge reported that the Xbox User Research & Child Safety team had been "hit hard" by the layoffs, with the division's lead reportedly let go in the process. Rare veteran and game designer Gregg Mayles, the director of the now-cancelled Everwild, would also leave the company by October.

Bloomberg News report in October 2025 revealed that various recent developments for Microsoft Gaming's business strategy, such as their shift towards multiplatform publishing and a series of price increases on Xbox hardware, software and the Game Pass subscription model, were attributed to demands set by Microsoft CFO Amy Hood for the gaming division to satisfy a 30% profit margin following their acquisition of Activision Blizzard. The margins detailed far exceed the expected quota of 17-22% set forth by other publishers in the gaming industry, while the Xbox division was previously operating at a margin of between 10 and 20%. Journalist Jason Schreier of Bloomberg elaborated that these goals correlated with the Xbox division beginning to favor cheaper or higher-profile games over those with more risk after initially cultivating niche titles like Pentiment and Hi-Fi Rush throughout the earlier half of the Xbox Series X/S generation, as well as a potential realignment of the hardware divisions. Microsoft Gaming later told CNBC that, although the company sets ambitious objectives, the previously reported 30% profit margin target was inaccurate.

In December 2025, Microsoft announced leadership changes within Microsoft Gaming. Tim Stuart was named Chief Operating Officer of ZeniMax Media, effective in 2026. At the same time, Xavier Pokorzynski was appointed Chief Financial Officer of Microsoft Gaming, taking over financial oversight of Xbox and Microsoft’s gaming businesses.

=== Restructuring (2026–present) ===
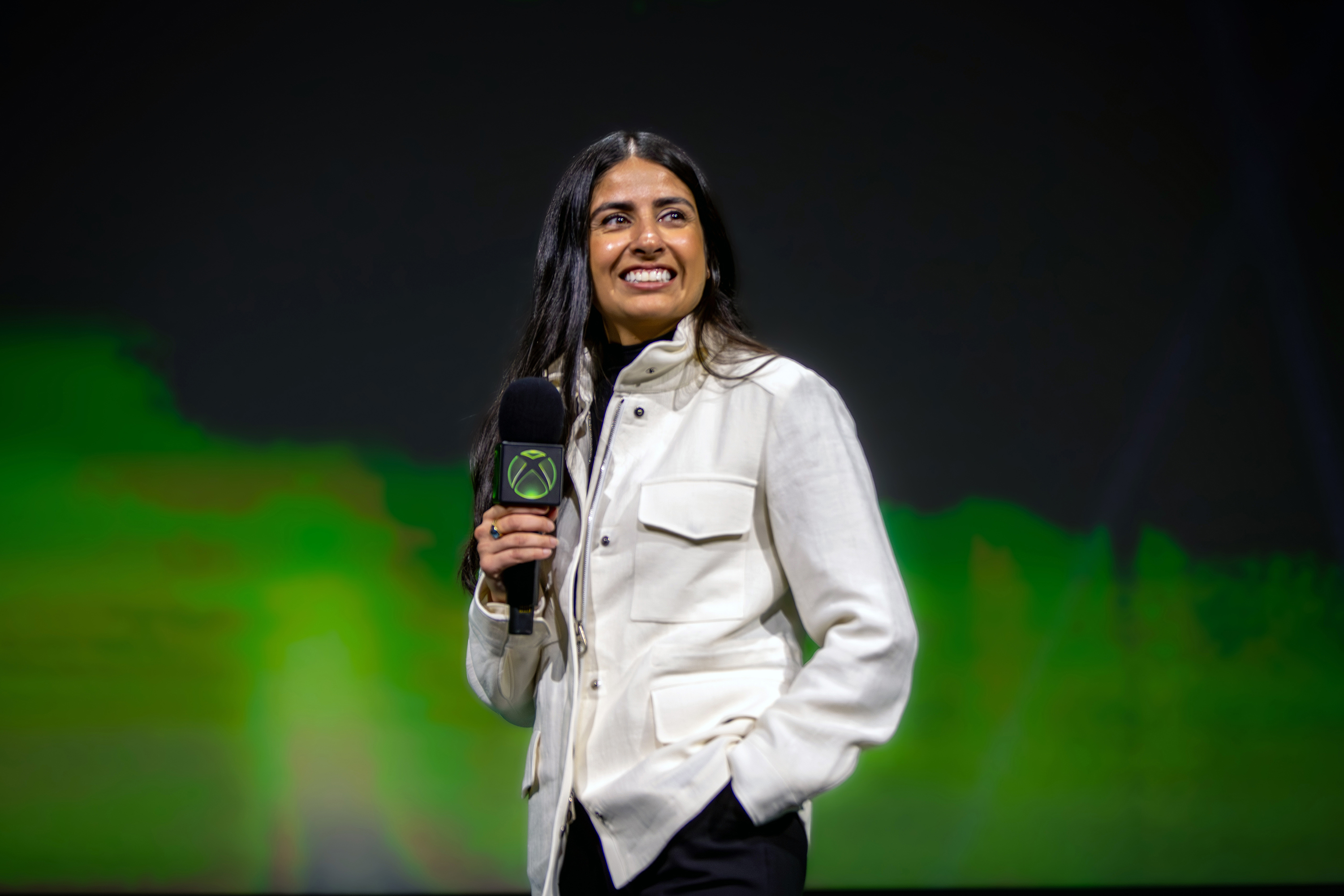
CEO Asha Sharma speaking at an Xbox FanFest event in June 2026

Spencer announced his retirement from Microsoft on February 20, 2026, with Asha Sharma, a senior AI executive for Microsoft, named as his successor of CEO for Microsoft Gaming. Booty was promoted to Executive Vice President and Chief Content Officer of the division. Sarah Bond, who has served as President of Xbox and played a key role in platform strategy, partnerships, and hardware transitions, would depart the company, though no replacement was named at the time. Several other leadership changes followed. In May, Sharma brought added management from the CoreAI division along with another executive she worked with at Instacart to help overhaul Xbox, saying "We need to evolve how we work and how we are organized across our platform." Industry analyst Matthew Ball was appointed as Chief Strategy Officer and former Microsoft AI executive Scott Van Vliet as Chief Technology Officer. Ball will focus on Xbox’s console strategy, while Van Vliet will oversee technology and product development. Xbox also promoted Chris Schnakenberg to Corporate Vice President of Partnerships & Business Development.

Under Sharma's leadership, several large-scale changes were made to the division. She rebranded the division as simply "Xbox" in April 2026 along with new logos, and established a renewed commitment towards Xbox's console userbase, new business and gameplay models with existing IP, and a denouncement of generative artificial intelligence for game development. Sharma intended to re-evaluate the division's approach to exclusivity, release timing, and AI was being reevaluated, with the division's new mantra being "We are Xbox". Sharma also said they would be retiring some features not aligned with their current business approach, specifically saying that development of Copilot for console and mobile would be suspended.

Project Helix, the fifth-generation Xbox console, was announced in March 2026, with the goal for the console to play both Xbox and Windows games. The cost of the Xbox Game Pass was reduced in April 2026, following the October 2025 price increase. Ball said this hike cost Microsoft "millions of subscribers", leading to the price reduction. With this, new Call of Duty games would not launch day one on the service, but would come about a year later.

Sharma's changes in game exclusivity directives came to head during the June 2026 Xbox Games Showcase, where two titles, Gears of War: E-Day and Clockwork Revolution, both which had been expected to be released for PlayStation consoles along Xbox and Windows, were announced to be console exclusives for Xbox. Booty stated that their first-party multiplayer games would be available for multiple consoles, but they would evaluate other titles on a case-by-case basis Ball said this move was to establish a consistent pipeline of exclusive titles to encourage investment in the Xbox platform and strengthen its brand identity, while identifying exclusives as important to the growth and branding of gaming platforms. Ball acknowledged that some Xbox exclusives may sell fewer units than they would if released on multiple platforms, but characterized this as a short-term consideration and indicated that the strategy was intended to support the long-term growth of Xbox's console business.

Sharma and Booty released an internal memo in June 2026, "Next 100 Days: Xbox Reset", outlining plans to improve profitability through annual first-party exclusives, lower hardware costs, streamlined operations, and modernization of the platform, while reaffirming Xbox's commitment to console hardware alongside PC, mobile, and cloud gaming. Sharma said in the memo that they had invested $20 billion into the division over the past five years, but their annual revenue had dropped by half a billion, and that "going forward, this cannot continue." Xbox Game Pass had failed to reach the 77 million subscribers by 2026 from the Activision merger, with estimates of only 30 million subscribers by analysts. Nadella, speaking on the memo that month, said "No one can accuse Microsoft of not having invested for the last 25 years. Now, we have to turn this into a sustainable business that delivers what is fundamentally one of the best sources of entertainment, still." Nadella said "There's more monetization of Xbox games happening on YouTube than at Microsoft" and poised that changes needed to be made to make the division economically stable.

Several sources reported of possible changes that may occur with the Xbox division based on inside sources. Bloomberg News reported that the division would likely undergo additional layoffs in July as part of a restructuring effort. The Information published in June, Microsoft was considering several options for the Xbox division, including a potential spinoff, creating a joint venture with other partners, or restructuring as a wholly owned subsidiary or Microsoft selling Xbox, with the division valued between $100 to $150 billion in talks with private investment firms. The report also stated that Xbox planned to accelerate the release cadence of games from its major franchises, particularly Fallout, Halo, and The Elder Scrolls, and increase investment in its high-budget AAA titles. Another report from Windows Central the same month said some of these changes were due to several factors that included losing money on each Xbox console sold, having failed to secure a supply of components before the global RAM shortage, several titles in 2025 and 2026 failing to meet sales expectations, lack of return on investment from the cancellation of first-party titles like Everwild, lack of products from the Fallout and Halo series to take advantage of their respective television series, and difficulties in recouping costs from Xbox Game Pass, including the loss of sales of Call of Duty, and several Microsoft games failing to meet an "accountability margin" for the service. Because of these, the report suggested Microsoft will reduce the number of tentpole franchise, with more investment into Blizzard Entertainment, and pulling back on the "AA"-tier output.

In addition to changes at the division level, the changes implied by Sharma's memo impacted Xbox Game Studios. Head officer Craig Duncan and his chief of staff Louise O’Connor announced their retirement on June 15, following the memo. Third-party developer IO Interactive confirmed to Bloomberg that Xbox had withdrawn publishing and funding for their online multiplayer title Project Fantasy in June after this memo, and while IO remained committed to the project, it shuttered its Istanbul studio and were making additional layoffs.

Sharma notified the division and its subsidiaries of major changes to its structure and staffing on July 6, 2026, as part of this reset. Sharma said the restructuring would reset Xbox's content portfolio and operating model, simplify reporting lines, and reduce management layers, which had been as deep as 14 layers, to no more than five, or three where possible. Sharma said these changes were to put focus on the Xbox hardware, which made up 80% of the division's revenue, and shift away from smaller studios into a more centralized approach, as the division had spread itself too thin before her tenure. She said "A healthy Xbox could weather the shock of the hardware crisis. With an unhealthy Xbox, it becomes really challenging, and it accelerates a lot of the changes we need to make." Sharma outlined a long-term recovery strategy in an internal memo at the end of July. Sharma set a goal of returning Xbox to player and revenue growth by the end of fiscal year 2027 (June 2027) while restoring profitability to industry-average levels. Asha said the company aims to surpass industry competitors in profitability by 2030, with sustained double-digit growth in players and engagement. The strategy focuses on four priorities: strengthening the Xbox platform, expanding major game franchises, growing Minecraft as a creator platform, and extending Xbox intellectual property across media and partnerships.

A total 3,200 employees would be laid off from within the Xbox division; 1,600 at the time of the July announcement, and another 1,600 over the next twelve months. Initial layoffs included roughly half of id Software, about 25% of Obsidian's staff, and cuts at ZeniMax (particularly Bethesda Game Studios) and Activision. Mojang Studios and King would now report directly to Sharma. Within Xbox Game Studios, Double Fine and Compulsion Games were released from Xbox Game Studios to return to independent studios, (Note: Both Double Fine and Compulsion successfully completed management buyouts to become independent by August 2026, both gaining control over their intellectual property developed while a part of Microsoft.) Undead Labs and Ninja Theory were sold to yet-named buyers, and Arkane Studios had begun negotiations regarding the future of the studio, all which had been rumored following Sharma's earlier reset memo in June. The Communication Workers of America union, which represented several of the studios impacted by the layoffs, filed complaints with the National Labor Relations Board for unfair labor practice, asserting the union was not told of these layoffs ahead of time.

Xbox introduced a new backwards compatibility program for original Xbox console games on Windows via the Xbox app and available via Game Pass, starting in July 2026. These games will include upscaling to 4k resolutions and various filters, and with achievements. The initial batch of games available included Conker: Live and Reloaded, Crimson Skies: High Road to Revenge, Blinx: The Time Sweeper, and Fusion Frenzy. On November 12, 2026, 21 more games were added to the backwards comparability for PC. Dataminers discovered that these games were possible using an Xbox 360 emulator, suggesting that games from that console would also be made available on Windows computers. The Verge confirmed that Xbox had notified developers of Xbox 360 games of being able to bring their titles to play on Project Helix, "Xbox PCs", and handheld devices. Xbox announced a "disc to digital" program starting in August 2026 for most Xbox One and Xbox Series X/S titles that would allow a player to claim digital ownership of a game they own on disc, including through clouding gaming.

As part of its restructuring, Xbox announced the elimination of 268 positions across Halo Studios, other first-party studios, and Xbox Game Studios management and central functions. Activision expanded its scope to include World’s Edge, Rare, and a new team established under Activision to develop the next Halo title. Bethesda expanded its scope to include Obsidian, King took oversight of Microsoft Casual Games, and Playground and Turn 10 were combined into a single studio focused on the Forza and Fable franchises.

The Information reported on October 20 that a group of private equity firms had explored acquiring Xbox at a valuation of $100 billion to $150 billion, but the discussions did not progress to formal negotiations. In an interview with The New York Times, Asha Sharma stated that Xbox was not being considered for sale, while Microsoft continued to evaluate partnerships, its operating model, and other measures to support the division's future. Microsoft executive Judson Althoff told Fortune that Xbox supports Microsoft's broader business by helping test its cloud infrastructure, maintaining retail relationships with companies such as Walmart, and reaching creators through Minecraft.

Helen Chiang, Xbox's first chief operating officer (COO), left the position in October 23, 2026, three months after the role was established in July 2026.

On November 3, 2026, Bloomberg reported that multiple companies, including Ubisoft, were in discussions with Xbox regarding the potential acquisition of Arkane Studios.

== Products ==
=== Video game devices and services ===
Xbox develops and produces the Xbox line of home gaming consoles along with associated peripherals. The company supports the consoles with online services, utilizing the base Xbox network. Since the late 2010s, Microsoft began combining its standard paid subscription service, originally known as Xbox Live Gold, with Xbox Game Pass, which provides subscribers with online multiplayer and matchmaking support, as well as a rotating library of games playable on Xbox consoles, Windows computers, or through Xbox Cloud Gaming.

=== Video games ===
Notable video game franchises in Xbox's portfolio include Age of Empires, Call of Duty, Candy Crush, Crash Bandicoot, Diablo, Doom, Fable, Fallout, Forza, Gears of War, Halo, Minecraft, Microsoft Flight Simulator, Overwatch, Quake, Spyro, StarCraft, The Elder Scrolls, Warcraft, and Wolfenstein.

== Organization ==
=== Executives ===
Xbox leadership (as of July 2026)
Role	Name	Details
Executive Vice President and Chief Executive Officer	Asha Sharma	Responsible for overall leadership, strategy, and execution of Microsoft’s gaming business.
Executive Vice President and Chief Content Officer	Matt Booty	Responsible for first-party studios, game development, and content strategy.
Chief Strategy Officer	Matthew Ball	Responsible for strategy, with an initial focus on console strategy.
Chief Financial Officer	Xavier Pokorzynski	Responsible for financial management and business performance.
Chief Technology Officer	Scott Van Vliet	Responsible for technology leadership and product development.

=== Divisions and subsidiaries ===
Unit	Description
Divisions
Xbox Game Studios	First-party video game development and publishing
XP	Film and television production, consumer products, strategic partnerships, and live experiences
Subsidiaries
Activision Blizzard	Parent company of the Activision and Blizzard Entertainment publishing labels and their development studios
King	Mobile and casual game development and publishing, including Candy Crush and Microsoft Casual Games
Mojang Studios	Development and publishing of the Minecraft franchise
ZeniMax Media	Parent company of the Bethesda Softworks publishing label and its development studios

== Business operations ==
=== Strategy ===
The business isn't how many consoles you sell. The business is how many players are playing the games that they buy, how they play.

— Phil Spencer on Xbox's business

The company aims to reach a wider audience and meet different gaming preferences by publishing games on mobile, PC and Xbox platforms. Xbox Game Pass subscription service is at the center of Xbox's strategy. This service offers a variety of game libraries for a monthly fee, emphasizing a shift towards a content-first platform. Microsoft Gaming's chief financial officer (CFO), Tim Stuart, has asserted that Microsoft ceased disclosing the number of consoles sold in 2016 because their focus shifted towards content, services, and increased customer spending.

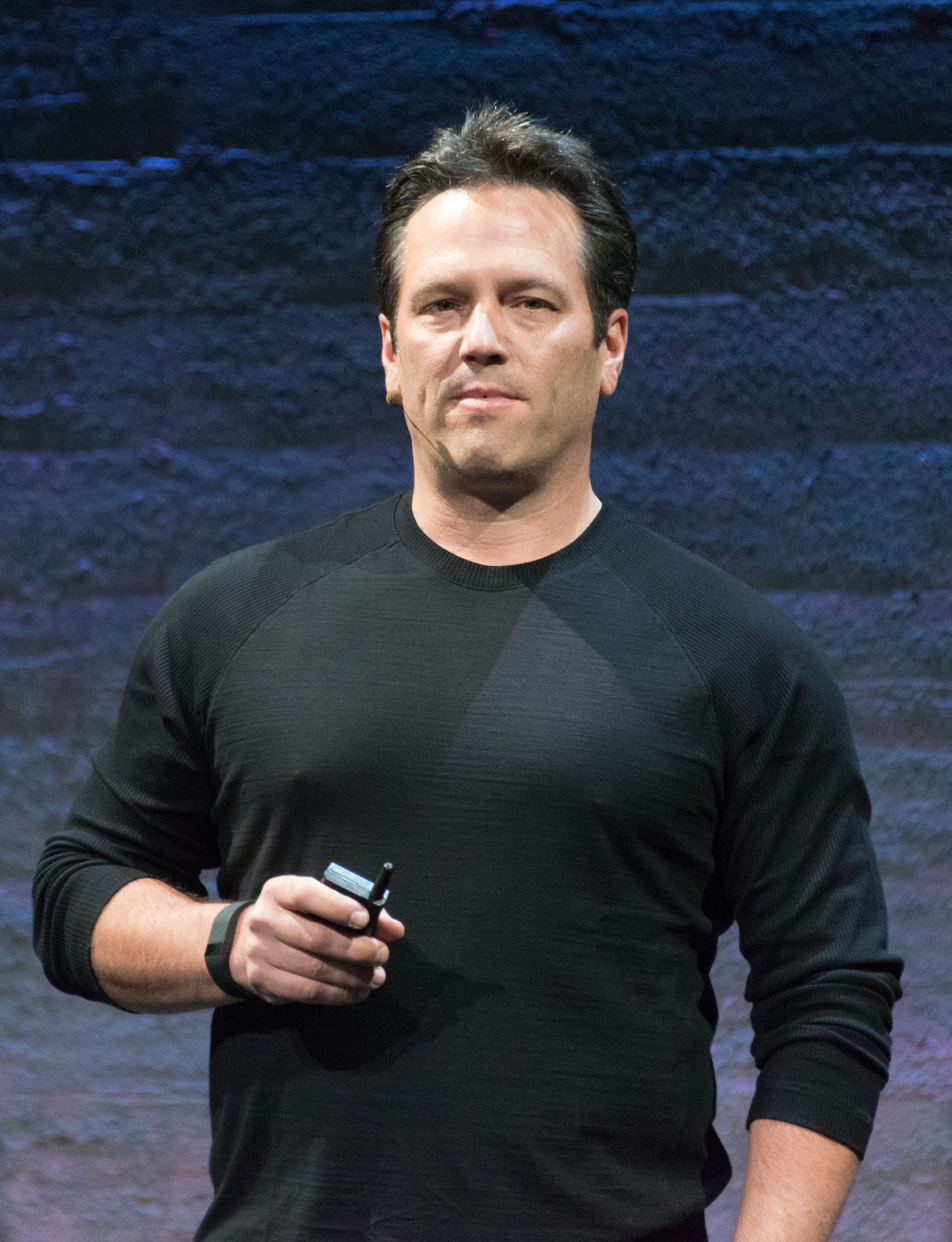
Phil Spencer served as CEO of Microsoft Gaming from 2022 to 2026.

Phil Spencer has expressed that his vision for Xbox has consistently aimed at shifting the brand's focus from being primarily console-centric to becoming a content-first platform, with a strong emphasis on prioritizing player engagement over sheer console sales. Phil Spencer expressed his viewpoint by stating that the essence of the business lies not in the quantity of consoles sold but in the number of players actively participating in and enjoying the games they acquire, as well as the manner in which they choose to engage with them.

By February 2024, Microsoft Gaming began planning to release their games on other platforms as part of a pivot in strategy to grow their franchises and compete with online game platforms like Fortnite and Roblox. Phil Spencer has stated that Xbox will continue to make exclusives and Game Pass will still be at the center of their strategy, but their goal is to expand the games with big communities.

We're the number two publisher in the world and in order to be a great publisher, you must have your games reach large audiences to play. At the same time, we're increasingly becoming a platform, and in order to become a platform, you must have exclusive content and services. And so, we're looking at that very closely. I think that we have to be very thoughtful about each title.

— Asha Sharma on Xbox's business

Under the new leadership of Sharma, the company’s strategy is centered on growing daily active players through four main priorities: hardware, content, experience, and services. The plan focuses on expanding and sustaining a strong portfolio of franchises, strengthening third-party partnerships while building out a five-year content pipeline, and expanding into China, emerging markets, and mobile-first audiences. By June 2026, Xbox had shifted its strategy toward console exclusivity, moving away from its earlier multiplatform approach, beginning with two titles. Sharma stated that, in order to become a successful platform, Xbox needed exclusive content similar to that offered by Sony and Nintendo.

=== Game development and publishing ===
Xbox, as of October 2023, is the third largest video game publisher in the industry following Tencent and Sony. Since Microsoft entered the video game industry in 2001, Sony has consistently been viewed as its main competitor. But, Xbox has stated that their main competitors are big tech companies, specifically Amazon, Google and Apple.

Xbox owns three major video game publishers: Xbox Game Studios, Bethesda Softworks (through ZeniMax Media), and Activision Blizzard (which includes Activision, Blizzard Entertainment, and King). In addition, the company also publishes third-party games with Xbox Game Studios Publishing and helps indie video game studios to self-publish their own games with ID@Xbox.

Among the gaming franchises owned by Microsoft, Minecraft is the best-selling video game of all time, with 400 million units sold, while Call of Duty is the 4th best-selling video game series of all time with 500 million units across multiple installments sold and $40 billion in revenue. Following the acquisition of Activision Blizzard, Xbox doubled the number of video game employees, studios and its revenue with the addition of Activision Blizzard to the company. Microsoft CEO Satya Nadella announced that Xbox now owns 20 franchises that have each generated over $1 billion in lifetime revenues. Candy Crush Saga alone generated $20 billion in lifetime revenue. In 2023, during an interview with Famitsu, Phil Spencer announced that, leveraging Activision Blizzard's capabilities, they are now planning to release a first-party video game every three months. On July 30, 2025, during an earnings call, Microsoft CEO Satya Nadella stated that the company had nearly 40 games in development.

=== Xbox console hardware and software ===
==== Hardware ====
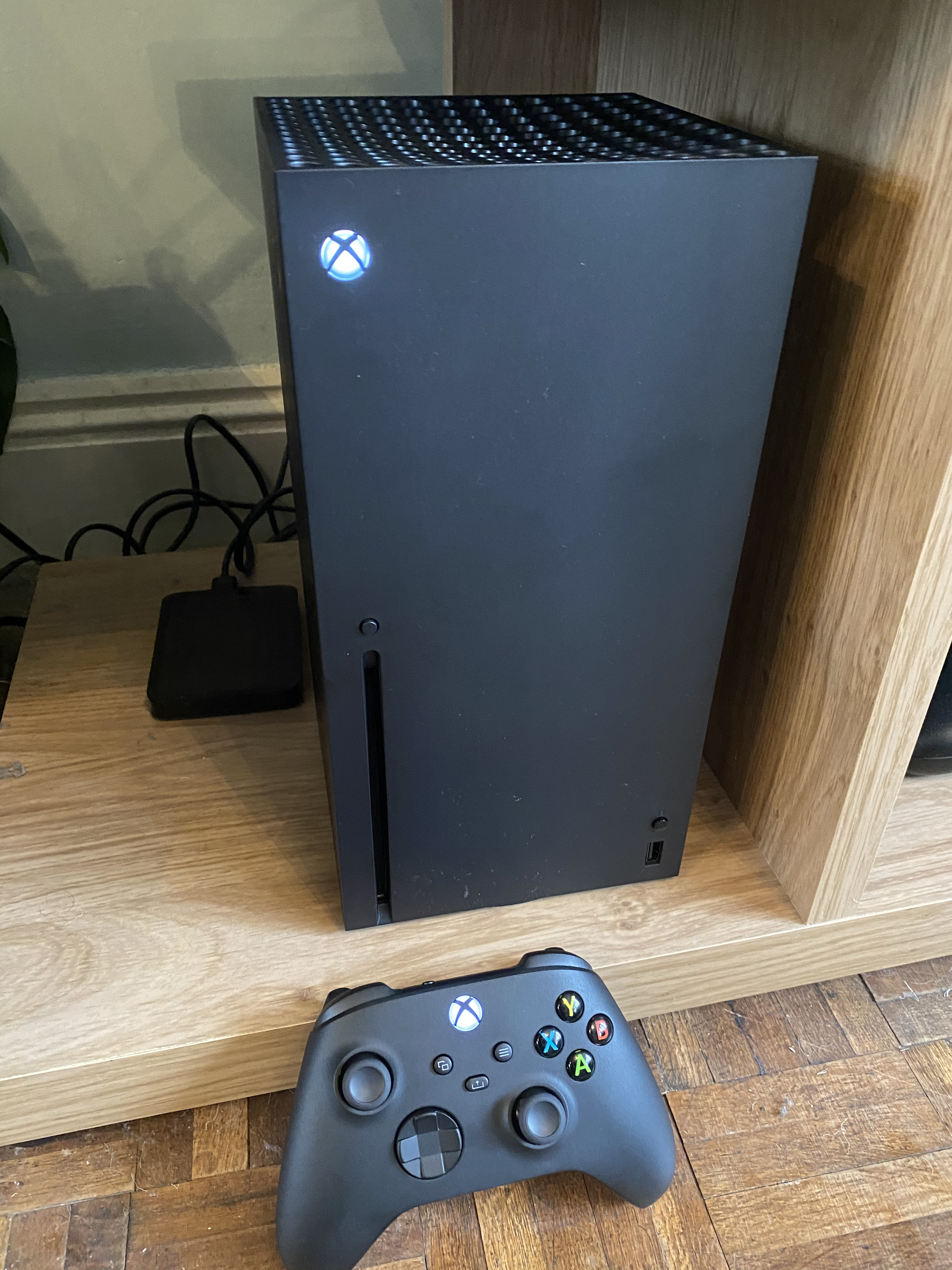
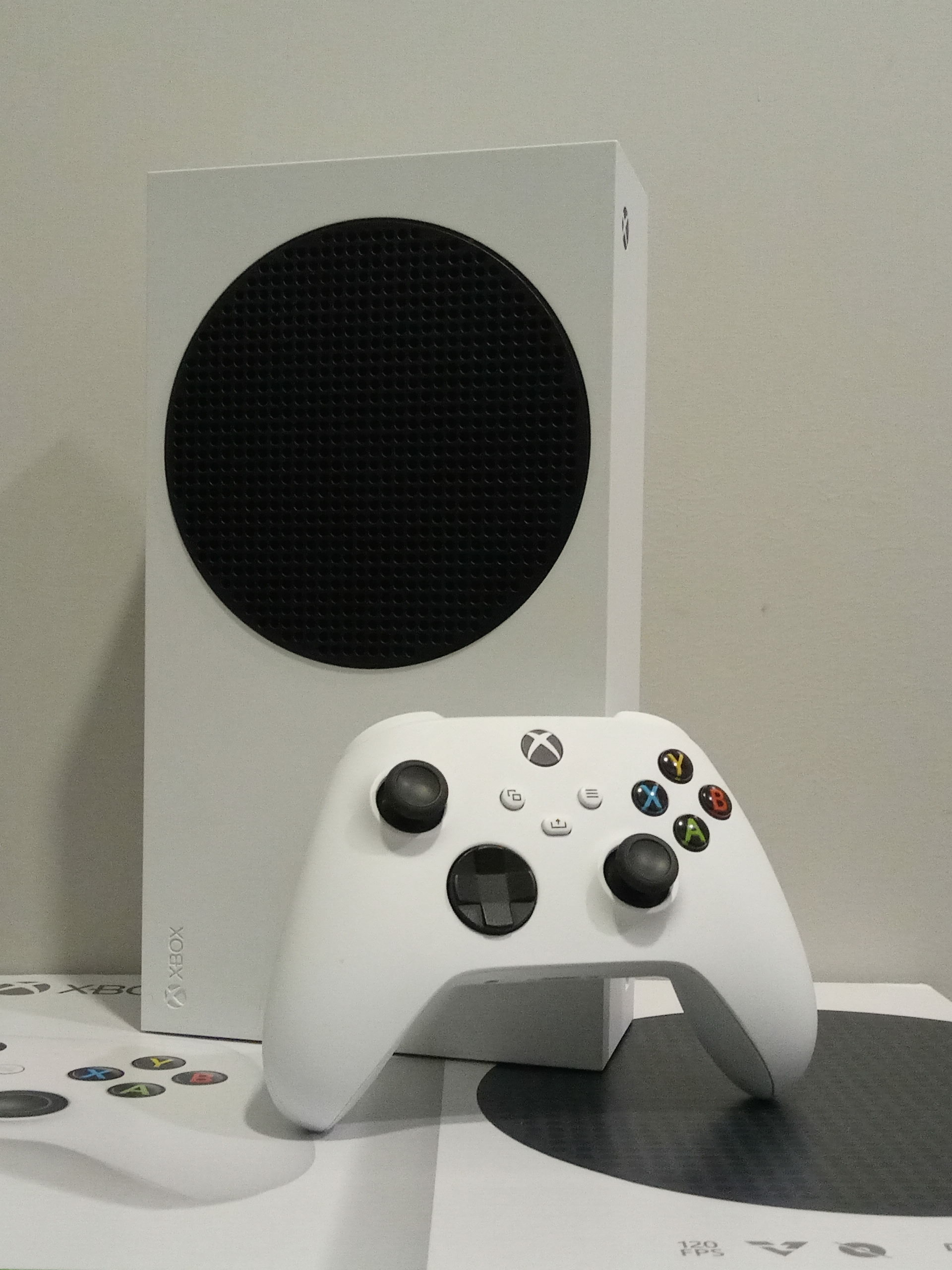
Xbox Series X on the left side and Xbox Series S on the right side – Xbox's latest gaming consoles

Microsoft entered the home video game console market in 2001 with release of the first-generation Xbox. It since has manufactured three successive systems, as of 2023, as part of the Xbox brand. Microsoft's latest gaming hardware, the Xbox Series X and Xbox Series S, were released in November 2020. The Series X is a high-performance console with powerful hardware for native 4K gaming, while the Series S offers a more affordable option with a focus on digital gaming at lower resolutions. Xbox Series X/S consoles sold 21 million units in total by 2023. Phil Spencer emphasized that Xbox is selling consoles at a loss, losing $200 per unit sold. However, Xbox is compensating for this loss by taking a 30% cut from sales of third-party games on its platform.

Microsoft and Sony have been longstanding rivals in the console hardware market since 2001. The competition reached a peak during the seventh console generation, with the Xbox 360 emerging as the primary competitor to Sony's PlayStation 3 (PS3). In the subsequent generation, Sony's PlayStation 4 (PS4) outperformed Microsoft's Xbox One, selling twice as many consoles. During the eighth generation of gaming consoles, the PlayStation 4 sold 117 million units, the Nintendo Switch sold 133 million units, and the Xbox One sold 58 million units. Sony's success is attributed to its exclusive game catalog and marketing techniques. Microsoft initially prioritized multimedia features over gaming capabilities; Sony has managed to exploit the perceptual gap. PlayStation 4 and Nintendo Switch have surpassed Xbox One due to their design and large portfolio of first-party games. In 2017, Xbox began rethinking its tactics and placing more emphasis on exclusive content and gaming-focused methods to better compete in the market. The Xbox Series X/S consoles continued to face challenges in competing against the Nintendo Switch and PlayStation 5 (PS5).

The console gaming market is defined as the combined total of console hardware, console game content, and console subscriptions. As of 2023, with a 45% market share in PlayStation system hardware, games, and services, Sony remains the worldwide industry leader, followed by Nintendo with a 27.7% market share and Microsoft with a 27.3% market share. Sony has a 70% share of the global high-end console market, while Microsoft has a 30% market share as of 2023.

At a bilateral trade discussion between the United States and Japan, United States senator Maria Cantwell from Washington raised concerns regarding what she perceived as a dominant market position held by PlayStation. The senator specifically highlighted the perceived monopoly by PlayStation and expressed support for Xbox as a competitive alternative. During a Senate Finance Committee hearing featuring U.S. Trade Representative Katherine Tai, Senator Cantwell highlighted concerns about high-end game market in Japan, asserting that PlayStation holds a 98% monopoly in this sector in Japan. Cantwell expressed disapproval of what was characterized as Sony's anti-competitive behavior facilitated by exclusive deals and payments to game publishers. The senator further criticized Japan Fair Trade Commission for purportedly neglecting to investigate Sony's conduct, referring to it as "exclusionary". Cantwell sought insights into how Japan aimed to establish a "level playing field" in response to these perceived issues.

Xbox partnered with Asus to launch the ROG Xbox Ally, a handheld gaming console with a hybrid PC design. Two models were released. The standard Xbox Ally offers access to Xbox Game Pass, Xbox Cloud Gaming, and PC game libraries. The higher-end Xbox Ally X provides a more powerful experience for demanding games.

In an interview with Fortune, Sharma stated that rising hardware costs were forcing the company to rethink the traditional console business. Sharma argued that future console generations could become too expensive for mainstream consumers and said Xbox was exploring ways to lower hardware costs through more flexible pricing plans and partnerships. Sharma added that the industry would likely see "radically different business models" emerge in the near future as manufacturers adapted to increasing component costs.

According to Fortune, Xbox's next-generation console is targeting a late 2028 release, with an estimated internal cost-based price range of $1,200 to $1,800. Xbox also plans to release its handheld game console in late 2027.

==== Software ====
Xbox manages numerous software services, including Xbox Game Pass, Xbox Cloud Gaming, Xbox Network, Microsoft Store, and Battle.net. The Xbox Network experienced substantial growth, with 120 million monthly active players as of December 2022, marking a notable increase from 46 million at the beginning of 2016. By July 30, 2024, the number of monthly active players had reached 500 million following the acquisition of Activision Blizzard.

=== Xbox Game Pass and Xbox Cloud Gaming ===
Microsoft launched Xbox Game Pass in 2017. The service is a subscription service that provides subscribers with access to a large library of video games for a monthly fee. Its catalog includes first-party and third-party titles, with games available across Xbox consoles and PC. Xbox Game Pass became an important part of Microsoft's gaming strategy, with the company expanding the service through new releases and third-party partnerships.

Microsoft reported that Xbox Game Pass had surpassed 25 million subscribers in 2022. The company has also invested more than $1 billion annually in acquiring third-party games for the service, helping expand its library. Subscriber numbers continued to increase, reaching 34 million by February 2024. Xbox Game Pass has also become a significant source of revenue for Microsoft's gaming business. Sarah Bond, Head of Xbox, said that the service generated $5 billion in revenue during the previous fiscal year and was profitable.

Xbox launched Xbox Cloud Gaming for Xbox Game Pass Ultimate subscribers on September 15, 2020. Xbox Cloud Gaming is Microsoft's cloud gaming service designed to allow users to play high-quality video games via streaming on a variety of devices. The service uses cloud technology to enable gaming on devices such as smartphones, tablets and PCs without the need for high-end hardware. Xbox Game Pass had reached $5 billion in revenue by July 30, 2025.

Xbox substantially increased the price of Game Pass Ultimate by 50 percent. The increase was met with criticism from subscribers, particularly because lower-priced tiers no longer offered access to first-party games on their release dates. The price increase was followed by slower subscriber growth and increased cancellations. After becoming head of Xbox in February 2026, Asha Sharma acknowledged that the changes had negatively affected Game Pass. Xbox reversed part of the price increase in April 2026.

=== Entertainment and licensing ===
Xbox has expanded its video game franchises beyond gaming through film and television adaptations, merchandise, and other entertainment ventures. The Fallout television series attracted 65 million viewers on Amazon Prime Video during its first 16 days, becoming the platform's most-watched series since The Lord of the Rings: The Rings of Power. A Minecraft Movie (2025) grossed over $960 million worldwide, becoming one of the highest-grossing film adaptations of a video game.

On October 8, 2026, Xbox established XP, an entertainment division bringing together its film and television, consumer products, strategic partnerships, and live experiences businesses. Named after the gaming term "experience points", the division is led by Kayleen Walters, the former president of Mojang Studios and executive producer of A Minecraft Movie. XP encompasses four areas: Xbox Pictures, focused on film and television adaptations; Xbox Products, responsible for licensing and merchandise; Xbox Partnerships, which manages collaborations with creators, brands, and communities; and Xbox Places, which oversees live events, broadcasts, attractions, and location-based experiences.

In August 2026, Puck reported that Xbox was seeking a long-term film and television licensing agreement covering more than a dozen franchises, including Halo, World of Warcraft, The Elder Scrolls, and Diablo. Netflix, Paramount Skydance, and NBCUniversal were reportedly among the companies considering the proposed agreement. In September, Blizzard Entertainment announced that an animated Diablo television series was in development with Netflix. In October, Puck reported that Netflix had offered $500 million for seven years of exclusive film and television adaptation rights, while Xbox countered with $800 million. The proposed agreement did not proceed, with Xbox reportedly shifting toward smaller deals with multiple partners.

== See also ==
- Acquisition of Activision Blizzard by Microsoft
- Games for Windows
- List of mergers and acquisitions by Microsoft
- List of Xbox studios
- Microsoft Casual Games
- Video games in the United States
