= 2022–2026 video game industry layoffs =

The video game industry experienced mass layoffs in a wave which began in 2022 and peaked in January 2024. An estimated 45,000 jobs were lost from 2022 to July 2025. According to the 2026 State of the Game Industry Report published by the Game Developers Conference (GDC), 33% of surveyed American video game industry workers reported being laid off during the previous two years, compared to 28% of respondents globally. The survey, which included more than 2,300 industry professionals, also found that half of respondents said their current or most recent employer had conducted layoffs within the previous 12 months. Layoffs were reported more frequently at AAA game studios, where two-thirds of respondents indicated their companies had reduced staff, compared to one-third of respondents working at independent studios. The report also found that 82% of U.S.-based respondents supported the unionization of video game industry workers.

From 2023, North America and Europe were severely affected, particularly California which accounted for 50% of all layoffs. By 2025, approximately 26% of European game developers had been laid off at least once over the period, and salaries fell in a number of roles due to high competition. Unity programmers in particular saw their salaries fall by an estimated 50%. Over 30 video game development studios laid off their entire staff and shut down. Some of the most notable company closures include: BioWare, Monolith Productions, Bluepoint Games, Arkane Austin, Sanzaru Games, The Initiative, Ready at Dawn, Luminous Productions, Volition, London Studio, Pixelopus, Riot Forge, Armature Studio, Twisted Pixel Games, and others.

Games industry layoffs by year
Year	Number of layoffs
2022	8,500
2023	10,500
2024	15,650
2025	9,200

These layoffs had reverberating effects on both established and emerging games companies, impacting employees, projects, and the overall landscape of the games industry. Major job cuts took place at Embracer Group, Unity Technologies, Microsoft Gaming, Electronic Arts, Sony Interactive Entertainment, Epic Games, Take-Two Interactive, Ubisoft, Sega, and Riot Games. The layoffs caused several video games to be canceled, video game studios to be shut down or divested from their parent company, and thousands of employees to lose their jobs.

The COVID-19 pandemic led to an increase in interest in gaming globally, and was a period of dramatic expansion in the industry, with many mergers and acquisitions conducted. In many cases companies over-expanded, as this rapid COVID-era growth was unsustainable. The industry began to slow in 2022, and amid spiralling costs and a shift in consumer habits, layoffs began. These were primarily limited to China and Russia to begin with, with the Chinese industry adversely affected by a licensing freeze and the Russian industry by the Russian invasion of Ukraine respectively.

According to a report by DDM Games, the industry is currently in a "reset phase." Companies are restructuring their operations through closures, layoffs, and divestitures. The pandemic-induced growth surge has subsided, leading to a need for recalibration. AI is a concern for many developers also, though there is no indication that layoffs have been driven directly by its adoption. It may however have impacted illustrators and other professions particularly exposed to automation. In an interview with Edge magazine, Epic Games CEO Tim Sweeney discussed the current state of the video game industry. He described the downturn as the worst the industry has experienced since the 1983 video game crash. Sweeney also warned that shortages of computer components, driven in part by demand from artificial intelligence and data centers, could increase costs and create further problems for the industry. FunPlus CBO Chris Petrovic expects the industry to return to growth in 2026, with that growth primarily originating in developing regions like China, Turkey and Vietnam.

== Causes ==
The layoffs were not a singular event but rather the culmination of several converging factors. The COVID-19 pandemic unexpectedly fueled a surge in video game demand. This led companies to make ambitious investments in acquisitions, mergers, and staff expansion, anticipating sustained growth. However, as the world reopened and the market returned to pre-pandemic trends, the rapid growth proved unsustainable, and companies found themselves with bloated operational costs, necessitating cutbacks.

=== Rising development costs ===
The cost of developing AAA games has steadily climbed in recent years due to several factors. The increasing complexity of game design, the adoption of advanced technologies to create "visually stunning" experiences, and rising player expectations for expansive and cinematic content all contributed to this cost inflation. This put immense pressure on company budgets. The global economic slowdown in 2024, coupled with rising interest rates, made it more challenging for companies to secure funding. This limited their ability to invest in new projects and maintain existing ones, further contributing to the need for workforce reductions.

According to a report cited by the Competition and Markets Authority (CMA), development budgets for AAA video games have surged in recent years. While AAA releases previously had budgets ranging from $50–150 million, games set for release in 2024 or 2025 are now seeing budgets of $200 million and higher. Some franchises, like Call of Duty and Grand Theft Auto, have budgets exceeding $250 million and $300 million, respectively. Additionally, according to the CMA, one major publisher mentioned that a single AAA game could have development costs between $90–180 million and marketing budgets ranging from $50–150 million. For certain franchises, such as one cited by the CMA, combined development and marketing costs reached $660 million and almost $550 million, respectively. Activision noted the increasing need for multiple studios to meet the demands of annual Call of Duty releases, leading to greater reliance on outsourcing. According to Bloomberg, video game executives anticipate a trend towards big-budget games that take fewer risks and rely on well-established intellectual properties (IP), especially as game development costs continue to rise. Martin Sibille, Vice President at Tencent Games and a former EA executive, highlighted the increasing difficulty in taking risks within the industry.

Rising development costs have prompted video game publishers to either cancel or delay their games and lay off development teams. The Embracer Group notably announced the cancellation of 29 titles. Microsoft Gaming canceled Odyssey, a game Blizzard Entertainment had worked on for over 6 years and laid off some of the same staff who had worked on Odyssey. Sony canceled a live service game from Naughty Dog and London Studio, resulting in layoffs at both studios. Electronic Arts canceled an untitled Star Wars game by Respawn Entertainment, indicating a shift in focus away from licensed titles towards live service games and original IP. Ubisoft canceled three previously unannounced games in January 2023, citing dismal financial results from the previous quarter.

Some of the newly founded AAA game development studios, such as Ridgeline Games and Deviation Games, closed down before even releasing their first video game. Ridgeline Games, founded in 2021, shut down just three years later in 2024. It was previously led by game director Marcus Lehto, who made a decision to leave Ridgeline Games. EA laid off the entire team on February 29, 2024. Deviation Games shut down on March 1, 2024, just four years after its establishment in 2020. The studio co-founder, Jason Blundell, left the company in 2022, and the studio canceled its new AAA live service game in 2023. Less than two years after the studio was opened, Prytania Media closed Crop Circle Games, citing "changing consumer tastes" and "economic conditions changing due to the pandemic." Smilegate Barcelona, the studio established in 2020 to develop an open-world AAA console title, shut down just 4 years after its establishment.

=== Longer production cycles and higher wages ===
Rising development costs and longer production cycles have contributed to layoffs across the video game industry. Large-scale games often require several years of development and larger teams, increasing labor and operating expenses. Industry analysts have noted that developers in North America and Western Europe face higher salary and production costs than studios in regions such as China, South Korea, Eastern Europe, and Southeast Asia. As a result, some publishers have shifted development work to lower-cost regions or increased outsourcing efforts. The longer time required to develop major titles has also delayed revenue generation, leading some companies to reduce staffing levels, cancel projects, or restructure operations to control costs and remain competitive in the global market.

=== Consumer shift ===
The escalating expenses associated with video game development have prompted major gaming companies like Sony and Warner Bros. Games to pivot towards creating mobile and live service games. Layoffs and studio closures have also impacted successful live service game companies, such as Epic Games and Bungie. Several live service games launched in 2023 shut down within months, affecting developers and publishers alike. These games, which employ a substantial portion of the industry workforce and generate significant profits, have faced challenges including rising development costs, user fatigue with monetization, and revenue declines post-COVID-19. Additionally, trends like battle royale games are maturing, and expanding franchises to mobile platforms does not always yield expected returns. Sony's entry into live service gaming has encountered significant challenges and delays, resulting in the postponement of several major live service titles.

Although live service initiatives are becoming more popular, 68% of producers say their pipelines cannot support these kinds of projects. Furthermore, 53% of major studios expect difficulties in handling their technical debt. 88% of developers questioned said they are looking into integrating new tools into their workflows due to the steep rise in game production expenses and complexity. The market is nearing saturation, leading to increased competition for player time and higher user acquisition costs.

=== Post-pandemic response slowdown ===
The first few months of the COVID-19 pandemic brought about a sharp increase in revenue for the gaming sector worldwide as people looked for indoor entertainment. According to IDC, in 2020, revenue from mobile games climbed by 32.8% to $99.9 billion, while expenditure on digital PC and Mac games increased by 7.4% to $35.6 billion. The amount spent on home console games increased significantly as well, reaching $42.9 billion, up 33.9%.

In the ensuing years, this growing pattern abruptly stopped. Revenue growth from mobile gaming fell by 15% in 2021, and then fell even further in 2022 and 2023, to -3.3% and -3.1%, respectively. Sales of PC and Mac games saw a brief rise of 8.7% in 2021, a drop of 1.4% in 2022, and a rebound of 2.1% in 2023. Similarly, after a surge in 2020, console game spending plateaued in 2021 with growth at 0.7%, followed by a decline of 3.4% in 2022, before returning to growth at 5.9% in 2023.

A new fad in the video game industry, metaverse, once led many investors and companies to believe that it was the future of the gaming industry. Companies like Meta and Microsoft have made significant investments in this space. The Metaverse has encountered challenges impacting investor expectations. Meta reported significant operational losses of $13.72 billion in its Metaverse division in 2021, raising concerns among investors. Meta's acknowledgment that full realization of Metaverse products may take another 10 to 15 years tests investor patience with its long-term horizon. Inflation and economic uncertainties have affected consumer behavior, delaying the adoption of Metaverse-related technologies like headsets. Meta revised its monthly active user targets downward from 500,000 by the end of 2022 to 280,000, disappointing investors with lower-than-expected engagement.

=== Mergers and acquisitions ===
One of the primary reasons for layoffs in the video game industry is mergers and acquisitions. Video game companies believed that the significant growth witnessed during the pandemic would continue afterward, leading many firms to explore mergers and acquisitions. Between 2020 and 2024, 16 out of the 22 most expensive video game acquisitions in video game history occurred, with major players such as Microsoft, Sony, Embracer Group, Tencent, Take-Two Interactive, and Electronic Arts each making at least one acquisition.

After several acquisitions, Embracer Group announced that they will undergo a significant restructuring of the company, including the closure of studios, layoffs of employees, and cancellation of dozens of video game projects. Embracer Group faced a setback when a $2 billion deal with an anonymous partner fell through, later revealed to be Savvy Games Group. Savvy, owned by Saudi Arabia's sovereign wealth Public Investment Fund, had already invested $1 billion in Embracer. Following the deal's collapse, Embracer announced a restructuring, including shutting down or selling studios and pausing game development. The reasons behind the deal's collapse remain undisclosed, but it was intended to establish Savvy as a major player in the gaming industry. Embracer CEO Lars Wingefors had previously faced criticism for accepting investment from Savvy due to concerns about human rights violations by the Saudi government. After several restructuring programs, Embracer Group reduced its headcount by 7,761, closed or divested 44 internal and external studios, and decreased the number of game projects by 80.

Several studios and publishers under Embracer Group, Sega and Microsoft Gaming have either opted to spin off from their parent companies or have been compelled to be sold off, resulting in mass layoffs. On February 29, 2024, Microsoft Gaming studio Toys for Bob revealed their decision to spin off from Activision and operate as an independent studio, while expressing openness to collaborating with both Activision and Microsoft on future projects. Embracer Group announced plans to divest Saber Interactive to a private firm for $500 million. On March 28, 2024, Take-Two Interactive announced its intent to acquire Gearbox Software from Embracer Group for $460 million. On the same day, Relic Entertainment was sold by Sega to an unspecified investor, and Thunderful Group sold Headup Games to Microcuts Holding. Headup Games was initially acquired by Thunderful for €11 million in 2021.

=== Russian invasion of Ukraine ===
In February 2022 the Russian invasion of Ukraine caused an exodus of Russian studios and developers, many of which became established in Cyprus. By April, 42% of Russian developers had either already left the country or made plans to leave in the next few months. Russian developers outside the country have reported difficulty in getting projects funded by publishers, as trust is low. The online games market in Russia suffered an 80% decline that year, and the market collapsed in both Russia and Belarus. Many western video game companies ceased operating in Russia, and all major Russian video game trade shows- many of which had not been held since 2019 due to the pandemic- were discontinued. This included IgroMir and Comic-Con Russia as well as several e-sports events. Riot Games technical artist Farhan Noor hosts a website which provides tracking data for the layoffs, and this uses 2022 as the starting year for the period and includes the immediate aftermath of the invasion.

Vladimir Putin made a series of edicts over the following two years with the aim of revitalising the Russian games industry; these were ridiculed by outside observers as ineffective and impossible to fulfill. Putin effectively legalized piracy, and ordered the creation of a "Russian Electronic Arts" and a game engine to compete with Unreal. In 2023 he also ordered the creation of a game console on par with the PlayStation 5 and Xbox in only three months. Kommersant reported that such a project would take a decade, and others have noted that restrictions on importing chips to Russia would make that even more challenging. Techdirt questioned how well Putin understands the game industry given that he was 71 years old at the time of the console order.

Game development has continued within some Ukrainian studios during the war, though blackouts have of course disrupted operations. Nordcurrent's Dnipro office has continued development even after a bomb detonated fifty meters from the building and shattered the windows. Aurum Dust is a studio composed of a mixture of Ukrainians and Russians who are against the war, and has continued working together despite the fighting.

=== Chinese game licensing freeze ===
Beginning in August 2021, the Chinese government enacted a freeze on video game approvals. This was part of a crackdown on the industry, which the government termed "moral opium", and was accompanied by new restrictions on games for under 18s. The freeze was lifted in April 2022, but in the interim was significantly costly to the Chinese industry, affecting companies such as Tencent and NetEase. The freeze led to major layoffs and closures in China over the course of early 2022.

== Major layoffs ==
=== Embracer Group ===
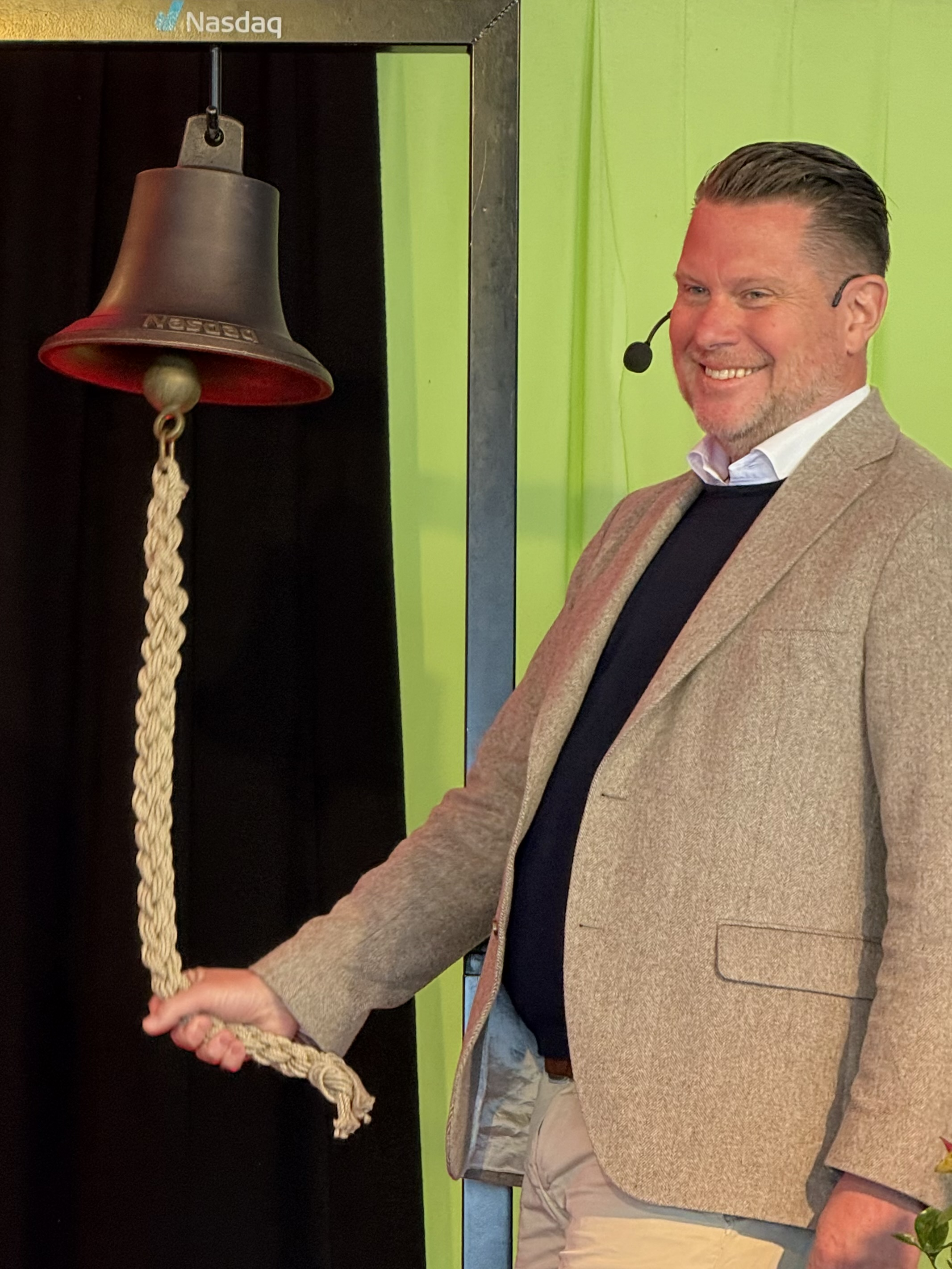
Widespread layoffs at Embracer have been attributed to CEO Lars Wingefors' aggressive M&A strategy.

Embracer Group pursued an aggressive merger and acquisition (M&A) strategy in the early 2020s, purchasing a large number of video game companies. Among the largest of these was a $1.3 billion acquisition of Gearbox Software.

In 2023, a planned $2 billion deal with Saudi Public Investment Fund fell apart. PC Gamer has referred to Embracer's structure at this time as an "unsustainable house of cards", which abruptly collapsed under financial pressures. Their sudden cash shortage after rapid over-expansion led to a "strategic pivot", and resulted in a very large wave of layoffs, game cancellations, and studio closures. These took place between August 2023 and March 2024. The company reportedly reduced its headcount from 15,701 to 7,873; a reduction of approximately 8,000 workers or over half of their 2024 total. The 8,000 workers lost from Embracer were about a fifth of the total lost over the layoff period globally. The group closed or divested 44 internal and external studios, and decreased the number of game projects by 80.

The company later announced that it will be separated into three standalone companies by 2026. The company proposed moving Wingefors into an executive chair position in June 2025, in a move backed by its largest shareholder Lars Wingefors AB- a distinct investment company. Embracer Group would then announce that Wingefors would resign from its position and would be replaced by Phil Rogers, formerly of Eidos Interactive and Square Enix, effective in August 2025. Rogers also serves as the CEO of both Plaion and Crystal Dynamics - Eidos at the time of the transition, and previously held the position as deputy CEO.

Wingefors acknowledged that mistakes were made during the rapid acquisition period, stating that "as a leader and an owner, sometimes you need to take the blame and you need to be humble about if you've made mistakes and if you could have done something differently." In August 2025, Embracer was referred to as a "layoff and divestment mogul" by Game Developer in a nod to the company's track record. The group were reported to be exploring further "targeted cost initiatives" at the time.

=== Ubisoft ===
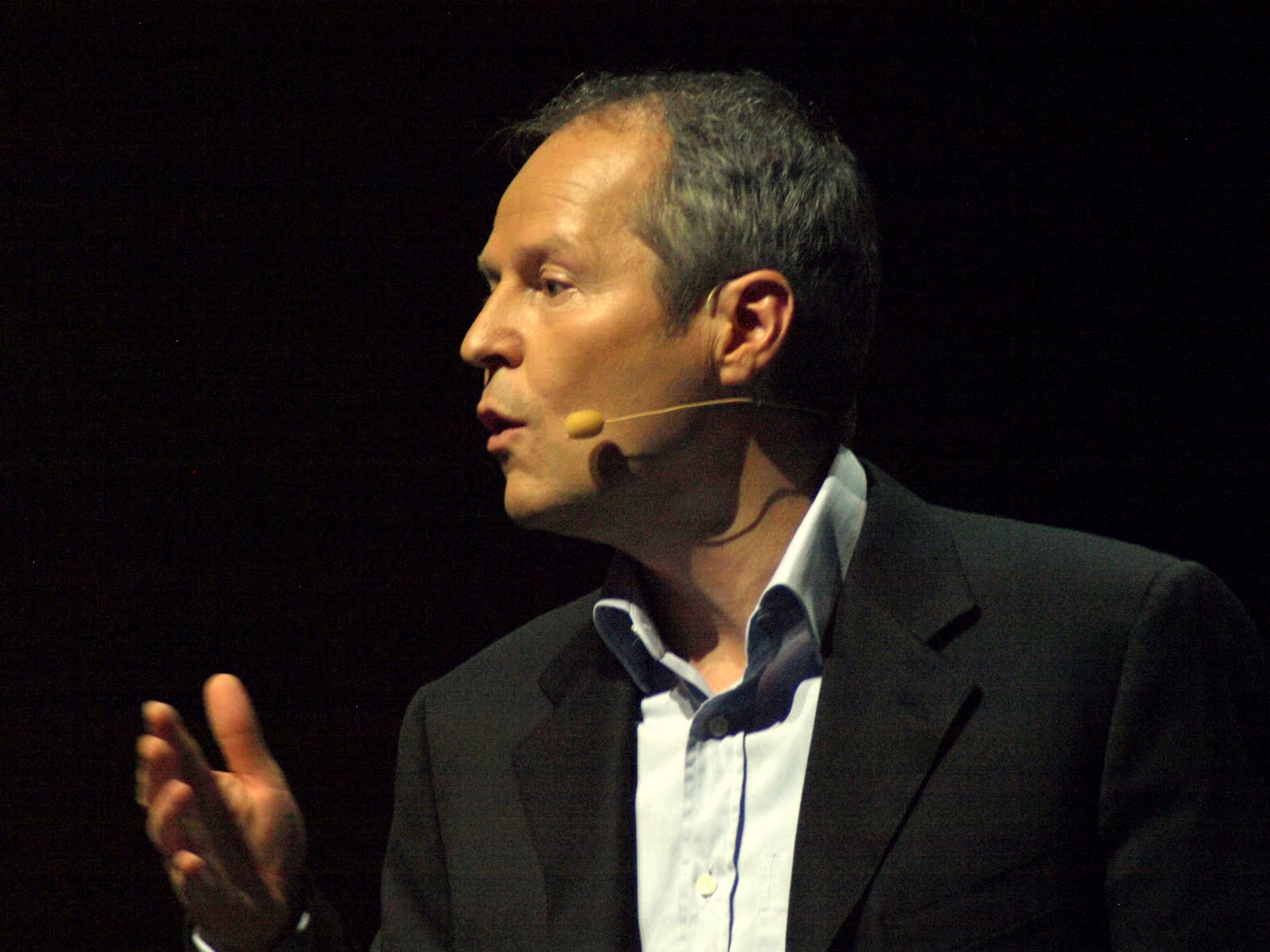
Ubisoft CEO Yves Guillemot has received calls from internal unions and the company's investors to resign over his poor management.

Ubisoft's layoffs between 2022 and 2026 occurred as part of a broader contraction in the global video game industry following rapid expansion during the COVID-19 pandemic. Rising development costs, project delays, uneven commercial performance, and a strategic shift toward fewer core franchises contributed to repeated rounds of restructuring. In 2022, Ubisoft began cost-cutting measures that included hiring freezes, project cancellations, and limited layoffs, particularly in support and administrative roles. These actions followed weaker-than-expected financial results and delays to several major titles.

Throughout 2023, Ubisoft continued "targeted restructuring." This included additional layoffs at multiple studios, the closure or downsizing of smaller teams, and the cancellation of several unannounced projects. The company cited the need to improve efficiency and focus resources on established franchises. These changes occurred alongside industry-wide layoffs affecting many major publishers. In 2024, Ubisoft reported further workforce reductions across publishing, support, and regional operations. By this point, the company stated that its total headcount had declined by several thousand employees compared to its 2022 peak, through a combination of layoffs, attrition, and voluntary departures.

During 2025, layoffs became more pronounced, with the closure of certain studios and additional job cuts across Europe, North America, and other regions. Ubisoft described these actions as part of a long-term restructuring plan aimed at reducing costs and stabilizing development pipelines. In 2026, Ubisoft announced a major corporate reorganization, restructuring its internal teams into new production groups and further narrowing its project slate. This phase included additional layoffs, proposed job reductions at its Paris headquarters, and further studio closures. The company linked these measures to financial pressures, investor expectations, and the need to concentrate on fewer, higher-priority titles.

=== Unity Technologies ===
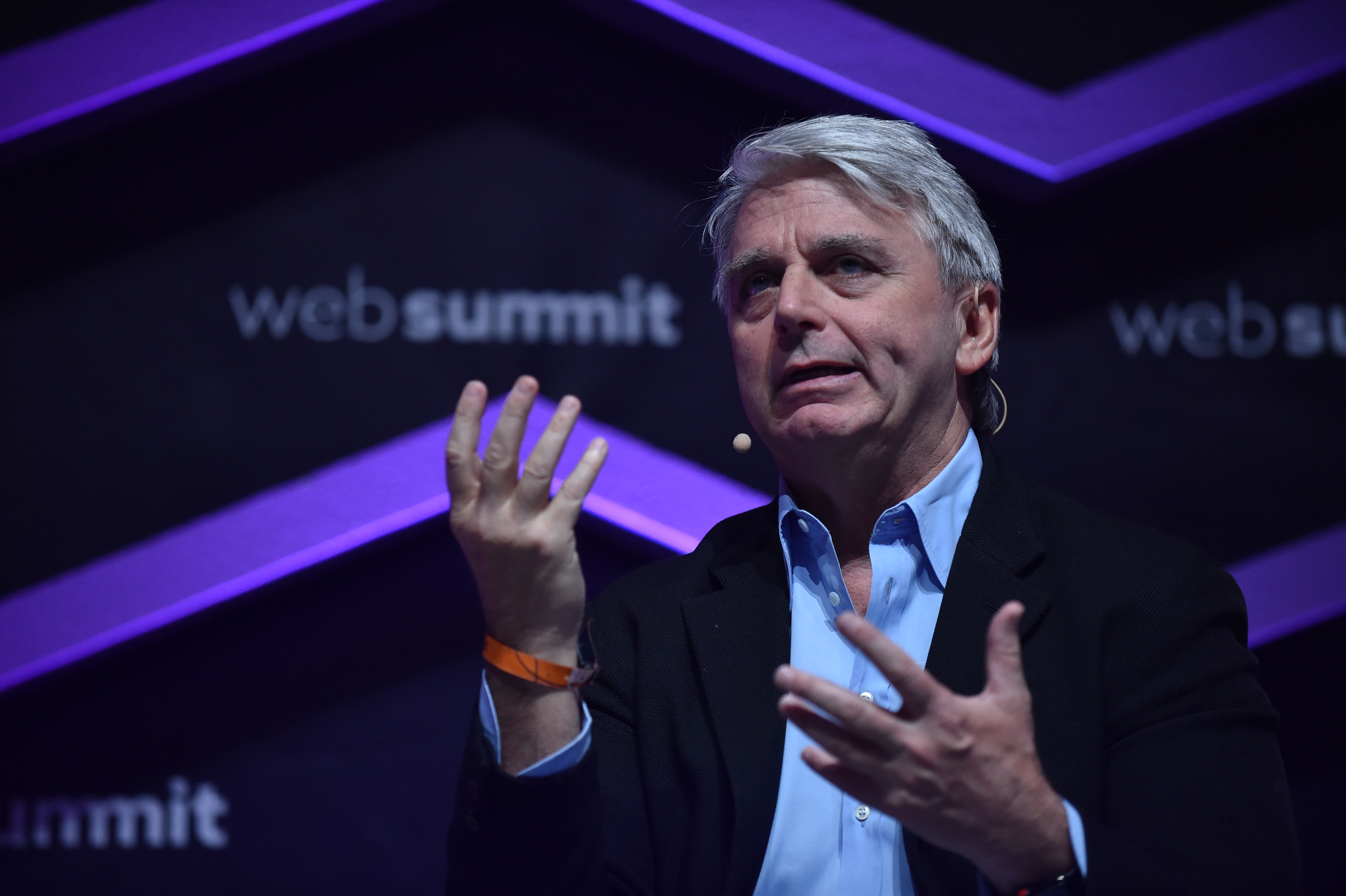
Unity CEO John Riccitiello's poor understanding of mobile gaming was criticized during the "runtime fee" crisis. He resigned in 2024.

Unity Technologies was severely affected, and conducted six rounds of layoffs between June 2022 and February 2025. The exact size of the layoffs have not been made public, but 80LV has estimated that they amounted to 3,165 to 3,365 redundancies over the course of the first five rounds. The sixth round is currently of unknown scope. PC Gamer has referred to the period as a "long downward spiral".

On January 17, 2023, Unity Technologies laid off 284 employees as part of a reassessment of objectives, strategies, and priorities in response to current economic conditions. CEO John Riccitiello explained that the layoffs were meant to reduce overlap and shelve certain projects to ensure the company's future strength. Later, on November 29, 2023, Unity announced an additional 265 layoffs, constituting 3.8% of its workforce, as part of a "company reset," according to Reuters. Most of the affected workers (256) were from the Wētā Digital division, which Unity had acquired for $1.6 billion in 2021, along with several Wētā FX tools and 275 employees. On May 3, 2023, Unity announced plans to cut roughly 600 jobs, approximately 8% of its workforce. Additionally, Unity intended to reduce its global network of offices over the next few years from 58 to fewer than 30.

The majority of the Unity layoffs occurred in the wake of a controversial pricing change termed the "runtime fee". The policy caused community backlash and a developer boycott. A number of studios announced that they were moving away from the engine permanently in the wake of the decision, and tools were developed to assist in porting existing projects away from Unity. The incident ultimately resulted in the resignation of Riccitiello, as well as the leader of their engine division, Unity Create chief Marc Whitten.

Unity reduced its headcount by a further 1,700 people and closed 23 offices in 2024, though it's unclear how many of those positions lost were the product of layoffs. Further layoffs were announced by the company in February 2025. The scope of these are also unknown but it includes the entire Behaviour team.

=== Xbox ===
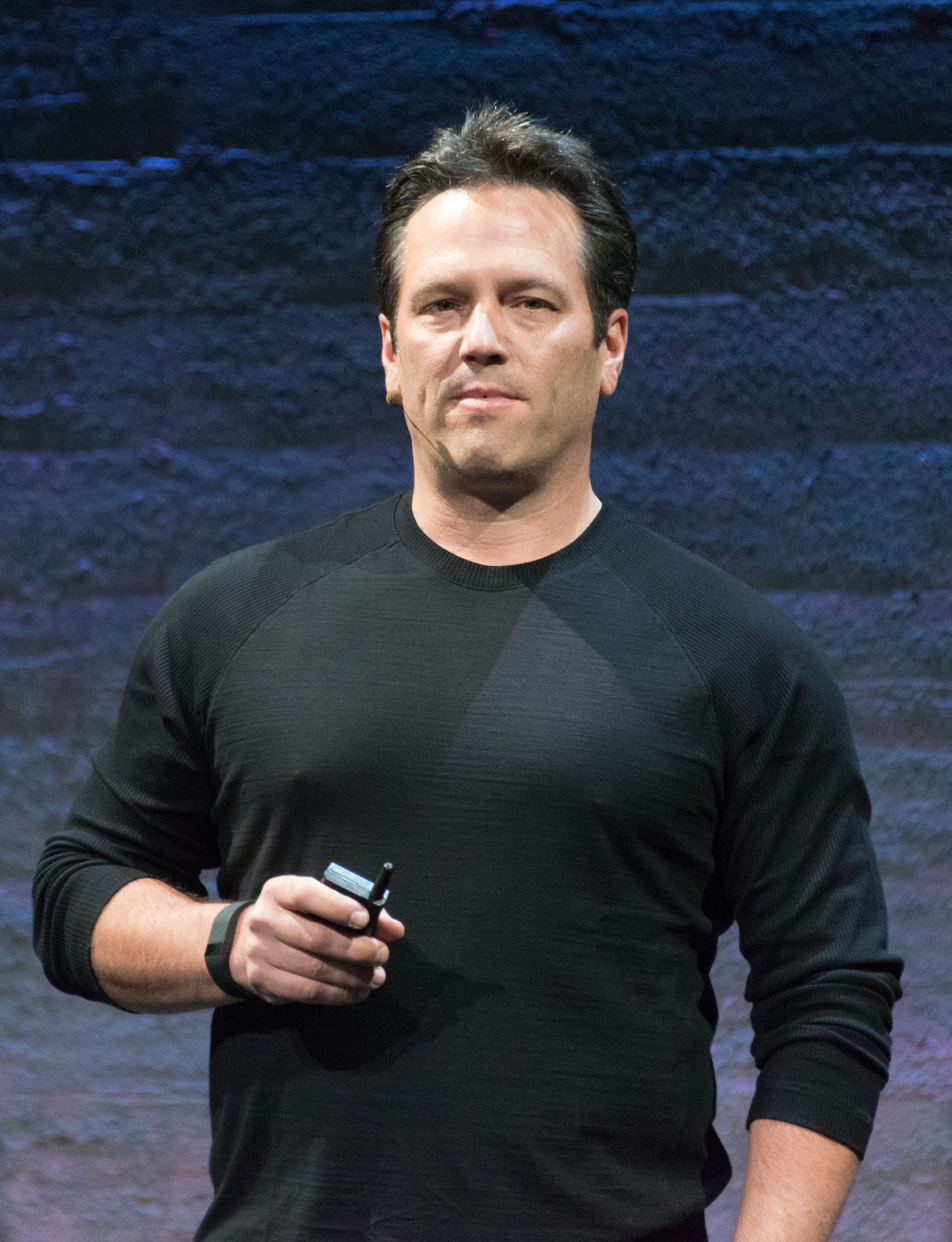
Phil Spencer served as CEO of Microsoft Gaming from 2022 to 2026, during which the company expanded rapidly through several major acquisitions

Microsoft also pursued a strong acquisition strategy in the early 2020s, including a $68.7 billion purchase of Activision Blizzard. Polygon pointed to long-term problems at Microsoft for mismanagement of acquired studios even before the early 2020s boom, such as their purchase and closure of Lionhead. The publication stated that "Microsoft gorged itself on the game industry, got too fat too fast, and now thousands of workers are suffering the consequences of its post-binge purge."

On January 31, 2023, as part of broader Microsoft job cuts, 343 Industries laid off 95 employees following the "disappointing" launch of Halo Infinite's multiplayer mode. Bethesda Game Studios was also reportedly impacted by the layoffs. On January 25, 2024, Microsoft Gaming underwent significant restructuring, leading to 1,900 staff being laid off. As part of this process, Blizzard Entertainment's President Mike Ybarra and co-founder Allen Adham departed from the company, while Blizzard's game Project Odyssey was canceled, and major teams working on Overwatch 2 were affected. Microsoft Gaming Studios, including Toys for Bob and Sledgehammer Games, saw staff reductions of over 30%, with most layoffs occurring at Activision Blizzard.

On May 7, 2024, Microsoft Gaming closed three studios: Tango Gameworks, Arkane Austin, and Alpha Dog Games, and announced the merger of Roundhouse Studios into ZeniMax Online Studios. This move was part of a larger "reprioritization of titles and resources" to focus on high-impact games and new intellectual properties, resulting in the cessation of development on certain projects and the reassignment of teams within Bethesda and ZeniMax. However, Tango Gameworks was acquired by Krafton in August 2024, retaining about half of its developers and the Hi-Fi Rush property. And on September 12, 2024, Microsoft Gaming CEO Phil Spencer announced that an additional 650 support and corporate roles would be eliminated.

On July 2, 2025, Microsoft announced more than 9,000 layoffs, a minor portion of which was from the gaming division. This included the cancellation of various projects such as Everwild and Perfect Dark, with the closure of the studio of the latter.

On July 6, 2026, Microsoft cut roughly 4,800 jobs, primarily within its Xbox and commercial sales divisions, while divesting game studios Compulsion Games, Double Fine, Ninja Theory, and Undead Labs. Just two days later, layoffs took place at ZeniMax Online Studios and Id Software. A few months later in September, another Xbox studio, World's Edge, was hit with layoffs accounting for just under half of the company's employees.

=== Sony Interactive Entertainment ===
On October 31, 2023, Sony Interactive Entertainment announced additional layoffs affecting around 100 Bungie employees and disclosed delays for two upcoming titles: Marathon and the Destiny 2 expansion, The Final Shape. According to Bloomberg, the layoffs came weeks after executives revealed that Bungie's revenue was 45% lower than projected, which Parsons attributed to the underperformance of Lightfall.

On February 27, 2024, Sony Interactive Entertainment announced the layoff of 900 employees across various studios, citing the need to restructure operations in response to the evolving economic landscape and changes in product development, distribution, and launch strategies. Layoff timelines vary by location, and PlayStation's London Studio was closed entirely.

On July 31, 2024, Sony announced further layoffs at Bungie, cutting 220 employees (17% of Bungie's workforce), while 155 employees were reassigned to other PlayStation Studios, and around 40 moved to a new studio. Bungie CEO Pete Parsons acknowledged that the company had been overly ambitious and exceeded its financial safety margins, operating at a loss.

On October 29, 2024, in light of the unsuccessful launch and subsequent shutdown of Firewalk Studio's live-service game Concord, Sony Interactive Entertainment announced the closure of two studios resulting in 210 layoffs. Firewalk Studios closure resulted in 170 employees being laid off and the Neon Koi closure resulted in their unannounced live-service mobile game being canceled alongside the layoff of 40 employees.

During the first quarter of 2025, on February 14, 2025, an estimated 25 contingent workers were laid off from Bend Studio as a result of the cancellation of its unannounced live-service game the month prior. This project cancellation later impacted PlayStation Visual Arts as on March 5, 2025, it was reported that an unknown number of staff were laid off. Separately, that same day, PlayStation Malaysia also underwent layoffs. Later on June 10, 2025, 30% of the full-time staff at Bend Studio, around 40 people, were laid off as the studio transitioned into a new project.

In June 2026, Bungie, a subsidiary of Sony Interactive Entertainment, underwent significant layoffs following the end of active development on Destiny 2. Bungie announced that the game's final live-service content update had been released and that future support would be limited primarily to maintenance and server operations as Bungie shifted its focus toward new projects and internal restructuring.

=== Electronic Arts ===
On March 29, 2023, Electronic Arts (EA) laid off 6 percent of its workforce as part of a strategic shift to reevaluate its investment strategy and reduce office space, according to a blog post by EA CEO Andrew Wilson. The layoffs were aimed at moving away from projects that did not contribute to EA's strategy, reviewing its real estate footprint, and restructuring some teams. While specific departments affected by the layoffs were not mentioned, efforts were made to provide opportunities for affected workers to transition onto other projects where possible.

On February 28, 2024, EA announced the layoff of 670 staff members. Wilson outlined the company's focus on owned IP, sports, and massive online communities as part of its business advancement. Additionally, EA shut down Ridgeline Games and canceled a Star Wars single player game developed by Respawn Entertainment. These cuts included 23 jobs at Respawn that were announced in March 2024.

An additional 300-400 layoffs took place in May 2025, resulting in the cancellation of a Titanfall game and the exit from the rally racing games by Codemasters. EA also closed the Seattle-based Cliffhanger Games later that month, cancelling the studio's Black Panther game less than 2 years after the studio's formation.

On October 21, 2026, Electronic Arts announced that it would lay off 400 employees and close BioWare. The decision followed the completion of a $55 billion leveraged buyout led Public Investment Fund (PIF) in August 2026. The restructuring also included the cancellation of the next Mass Effect game.

=== Epic Games ===
On September 28, 2023, Epic Games announced a layoff affecting 16% of its workforce, or around 830 employees. The news was initially reported by Bloomberg before Epic Games published its internal memo online. CEO Tim Sweeney explained in an email to staff that the decision was due to the company's ongoing financial situation, stating that they had been spending more money than they were earning. Sweeney expressed optimism about navigating the transition without layoffs but acknowledged that it was unrealistic in retrospect."

On March 24, 2026, Epic Games announced more than 1,000 employees, around as much as 23% of the company, would be laid off, as well as the upcoming permanent deactivation of the Fortnite game modes Rocket Racing, Ballistic, and Festival Battle Stage. In a note left for staff, Sweeney stated the layoffs was due to a decrease in player engagement for Fortnite at the beginning of 2025, stating that the company was spending a lot more than they were making and justified that major cuts needed to be made in order to keep the company funded; he further denied the layoffs were linked to AI. He further announced that around $500 million of costs linked to contracts, marketing, and the closing of open roles roles was also cut in order to put the company "a more stable place." The announcement also included that laid off employees would receive a severance package containing four months base pay as well as an additional amount based on tenure. Prior to the layoffs, Epic Games had also hiked the price of V-Bucks, Fortnite's in-game currency, to help support the company due to the rise in operating costs.

=== Take-Two Interactive ===
On April 16, 2024, Take-Two Interactive announced plans to lay off 5% of its workforce and cancel several video game projects. The company cited a cost-reduction plan, anticipating total charges of $160 million to $200 million. These measures are expected to be largely implemented by December 31, 2024. Previously, Take-Two Interactive stated that they were working on "significant cost reductions" but stated they had no current plans for layoffs.

=== Riot Games ===
On January 22, 2024, Riot Games announced a significant restructuring, leading to the layoff of 530 employees, which accounts for about 11% of the company's total workforce. The company also shut down Riot Games' indie publishing label, Riot Forge. The decision was made as part of Riot's strategy to refocus on fewer, high-impact projects, aiming for a more sustainable future.

== Cancelled major AAA video games ==
Games for which only working titles were publicized are written in quotation marks.

Title	Cancellation date	Developer	Ref.
The Last of Us Online	December 14, 2023	Naughty Dog	
Hyenas	September 28, 2023	Creative Assembly	
"Odyssey"	January 25, 2024	Blizzard Entertainment	
Unannounced Deus Ex game	January 29, 2024	Eidos-Montréal	
Battlefield Mobile	January 31, 2023	Industrial Toys	
Untitled live service game	February 27, 2024	London Studio	
Untitled Star Wars FPS game	February 28, 2024	Respawn Entertainment	
Tom Clancy's The Division Heartland	May 15, 2024	Red Storm Entertainment	
Assassin's Creed "Project Scarlet"	July 2024	Ubisoft	
Destiny "Project Payback"	August 2, 2024	Bungie	
Untitled live service game	January 16, 2025	Bend Studio	
Unannounced God of War live service game	January 16, 2025	Bluepoint Games	
Untitled Wonder Woman game	February 25, 2025	Monolith Productions	
Untitled Titanfall extraction shooter game	April 29, 2025	Respawn Entertainment	
Untitled game	April 29, 2025	Respawn Entertainment	
Untitled Black Panther game	May 28, 2025	Cliffhanger Games	
Hytale (Note: Riot Games later sold the IP rights back to Hypixel Studios, which was revived as an indie game later that year.)	June 23, 2025	Hypixel Studios	
Everwild	July 2, 2025	Rare	
"Project Blackbird"	July 2, 2025	ZeniMax Online Studios	
Perfect Dark	July 2, 2025	The Initiative & Crystal Dynamics	
Contraband	August 7, 2025	Avalanche Studios Group	
Prince of Persia: The Sands of Time Remake	January 21, 2026	Ubisoft	
Spellcasters Chronicles	May 20, 2026	Quantic Dream	
Last Sentinel	July 31, 2026	LightSpeed LA	
PUBG: Black Budget	October 1, 2026	PUBG Corporation	
Untitled The Sims game	October 21, 2026	Maxis	
Mass Effect: Universe	October 21, 2026	BioWare	
Fairgame$	November 10, 2026	Haven Studios	

== Reactions ==
=== Media outlets ===
Some media outlets compared the 2023–2024 layoffs to the video game crash of 1983, when the US video game market collapsed due to an oversaturation of poorly made, low-quality games, causing the video game industry to enter a recession for two years. This has sparked discussions about a potential "second video game crash." Windows Central's article titled "Embracer Group is a prime example of bad consolidation" criticized Embracer Group for its frequent layoffs, studio closures, and personnel cuts. The closure of Volition Studios, layoffs at Lost Boys Interactive, and the shutdown of Free Radical Design are highlighted as notable incidents.

=== Publishers ===
Both Microsoft and Sony have acknowledged that the current approach cannot continue and are exploring alternative business models. Microsoft Gaming CEO Phil Spencer addresses the stagnation in the gaming industry, recognizing its repercussions on job cuts and the challenging decisions faced by companies. He underscores the importance of industry expansion for long-term sustainability, advocating for a shift towards enlarging the player base rather than solely concentrating on extracting revenue from existing players. By prioritizing the growth of Xbox through attracting new players and nurturing creators, Phil aims to guarantee enduring strength and prosperity for the platform and the industry overall.

When asked about the gaming layoffs, Phil Spencer addressed both the broader industry trend and the unique aspects related to Xbox's current business. Spencer expressed concern over the lack of growth in the industry, highlighting the pressure on publicly traded companies to show growth to investors. This scrutiny often leads to cost-cutting measures when revenue growth is stagnant. Spencer emphasized the need for the industry to focus on regaining growth to ensure job security and career opportunities for professionals. Regarding Xbox's strategy, he discussed the importance of exclusivity and expanding the player base by making games available on multiple platforms. Spencer stated that every decision made by Xbox is aimed at strengthening the brand in the long run, even if not everyone agrees with those decisions. Spencer also touched on the evolving nature of Xbox, stating that the brand is moving away from traditional exclusivity models to adapt to the preferences of younger audiences. Spencer emphasized that Xbox aims to be a platform where players can find the games they want, regardless of the device they use, aligning with the accessibility and cross-platform trends seen among younger gamers.

Sony Interactive Entertainment chairman Hiroki Totoki stated that he acknowledges the need to manage development costs better in PlayStation Studios, recognizing industry-wide challenges like rising expenses and lengthy schedules. Totoki emphasizes sustainable profitability and transparently addressing challenges while highlighting the significance of first-party titles achieving growth across platforms.

Wes Keltner, CEO of Gun Interactive, expressed concern about the shrinking space for creative and innovative ideas from small game development teams. Keltner noted a lack of funding for indie projects, leading to promising ideas being abandoned at the prototype stage. Keltner highlighted the trend of mergers and acquisitions (M&A) leading to larger studios but diminishing creative freedom. He emphasized the notion that risk is a driving force behind creativity in the gaming industry.

=== Game developers ===
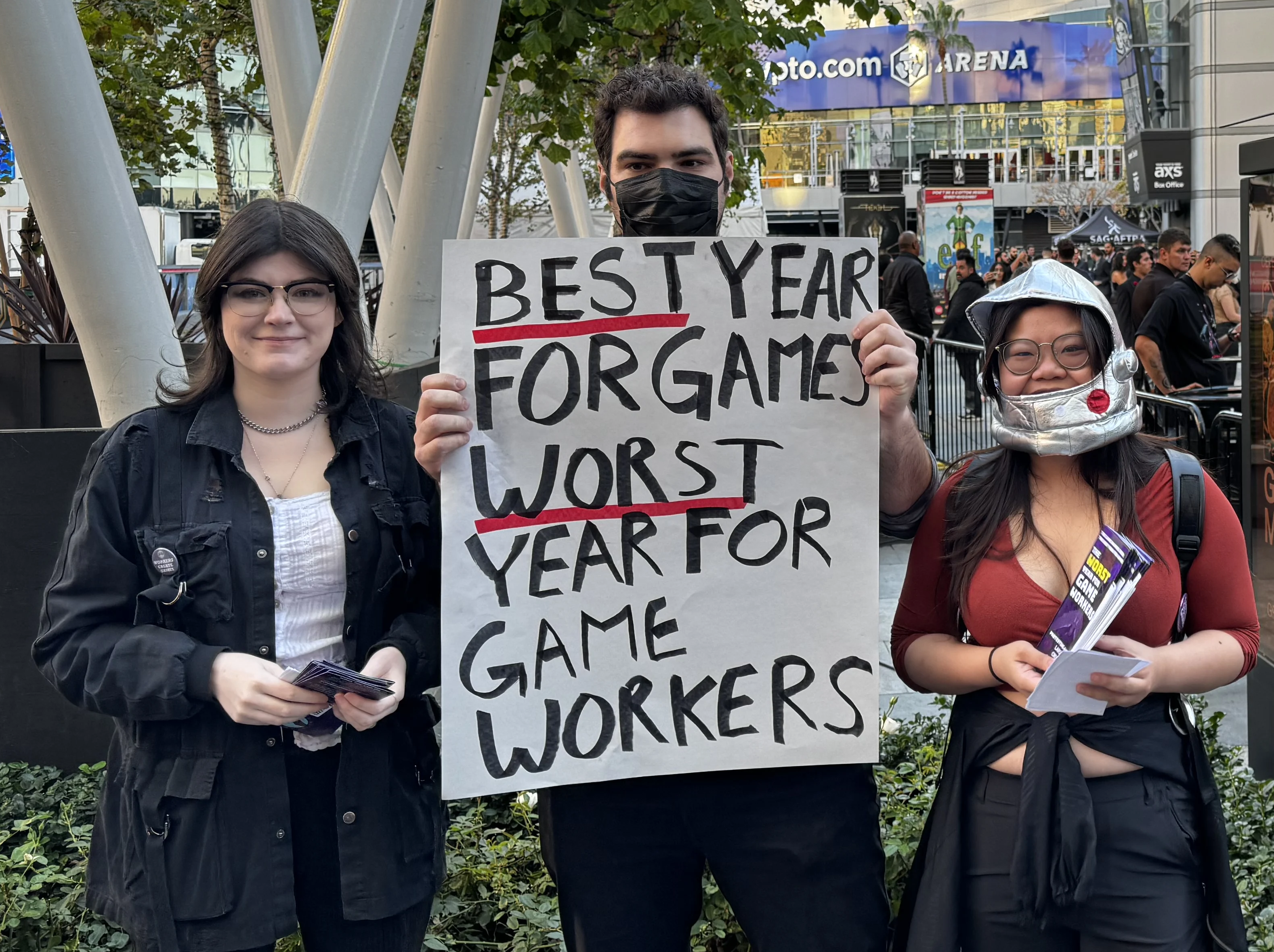
The Game Awards 2023 was picketed by protestors advocating for unionization in the video game industry.

In response to layoffs in the gaming industry, developers expressed a mixture of frustration, disillusionment, and concern about the future. Many felt blindsided by the layoffs, especially when they were told the reasons were related to underperforming games or unsustainable costs. Some developers pointed out the disconnect between management decisions and the realities of game development, such as over scoping projects or investing in risky technologies without clear strategies. There was also criticism of how layoffs were handled, with some developers feeling that companies prioritized executive salaries and unnecessary expenses over investing in game development.

There were instances where studios spent extravagantly on events or office perks shortly before laying off a significant portion of their workforce, leading to feelings of betrayal among employees. Developers highlighted broader industry trends contributing to the instability, such as the increasing reliance on outside investors and shareholders who prioritize short-term profits over long-term sustainability. The pandemic exacerbated these issues but was not solely responsible for the ongoing wave of layoffs. Overall, developers expressed deep concern about the future of the industry and the toll these layoffs were taking on morale and creativity. Many feared that the current instability could have long-lasting consequences for both individuals and the industry as a whole.

At Game Developers Conference 2024, Epic Games staff organised a "GDScream", where a large number of developers gathered in a park to scream at the sky in "a moment of pure catharsis". The trade show more broadly featured many speeches from award winners about the state of the industry.

Dinga Bakaba, the studio head of Arkane Lyon, publicly criticized Microsoft Gaming executives for their decision to close several studios. He emphasized the importance of taking care of artists and entertainers in the video game industry, highlighting that their role is to create value for corporations.

Taira Nakamura, a former producer at Sega, observed that while Japan's game industry avoids large-scale layoffs due to strict employment regulations, downsizing is taking place indirectly through reduced hiring. Recruitment quotas for new graduates have declined, and opportunities for mid-career professionals are becoming more limited. Amata Games CEO Hiromichi Takahashi also noted that projects outsourced to external developers have been scaled back.

During the downturn, Tencent business director Amir Satvat assisted nearly 3,000 laid off workers in finding new roles, and was presented with The Game Awards 2024 Game Changer Award and the Giving Award from Games for Change for this work.

== Future ==
=== Unionization ===
Unions are relatively rare in the video game industry. But after several public scandals involving abuse, sexism, layoffs, and overwork, some game workers have developed a keen interest in organization in the last few years. After starting the process in April, employees at Sega of America's Irvine, California headquarters filed to become unionized with the Communications Workers of America on July 10, 2023. In July, the union election was successfully won by the Allied Employees Guild Improving Sega (AEGIS), with 91 votes in favor and 26 votes against. More than 200 positions in a range of areas, such as marketing, games as a service, localization, product development, and quality assurance, will be covered by the union.

On October 6, 2023, over 100 developers at Avalanche Studio Group unionized. After experiencing layoffs, some workers at CD Projekt Red formed a union on October 9, 2023. According to the union, these layoffs caused significant stress and insecurity among workers, leading to the need for better protection and representation. The union aims to provide more security, transparency, and a stronger voice for workers in times of crisis, believing that mass layoffs pose a threat to the gaming industry and that unionizing is crucial for preserving its potential. The union said its priority was to give CD Projekt Red staff a voice in company decision-making, with a view to increasing employment stability. It also wants to help workers' voices be heard on working conditions "in the long run."

On December 5, 2023, 300 Quality assurance workers at ZeniMax Media announced that they were organizing a union. Additionally, a labor neutrality agreement was announced in June 2023 by Microsoft and the Communication Workers of America (CWA). Under this deal, Activision Blizzard employees were entitled to freely form a union, and Microsoft promised to acknowledge and support that union. On March 8, 2024, 600 workers from Activision's QA team joined CWA, establishing the largest game developer union in North America.

=== Growth ===
Despite the layoffs, studio closures, and cancellations of video game projects, as well as high inflation, the video game market continued to remain robust. Many investors and industry analysts believed that the video game industry would fully recover in 2025 and 2026 with major releases like Grand Theft Auto VI, Monster Hunter Wilds, Ghost of Yōtei, Doom: The Dark Ages, and Pokémon Legends: Z-A, among others. Investors also expected Nintendo to release its new hardware product, the Switch 2, which would boost video game sales and revenue. Executive Director of Circana (The NPD Group), Mat Piscatella, stated that consumer demand remains strong, but consumers are under pressure due to economic challenges. Some parts of the industry are already growing and in a healthy position, like mobile, and Piscatella believed that other segments would follow suit in 2025.

According to a 2024 PwC report, the global gaming industry is expected to reach a value of $321 billion by 2026. Deloitte predicts that the share of theatrical box office revenues from video game intellectual property (IP) will double by 2025. Additionally, most major video streaming platforms are expected to include shows based on popular games. Another report by GlobalData suggests that the video games market could become a $300 billion industry by 2025. Factors contributing to this growth include mobile gaming and innovative offerings. Bain & Company predicts that global gaming revenue could surge by over 50% in the next five years.

Mobile video games began growing in 2024, with U.S. mobile gamers spending over $28 billion that year. This marked a recovery for the industry after a two-year economic slowdown, surpassing the previous record set in 2021. Monopoly Go! was the highest-grossing mobile game, and Call of Duty: Black Ops 6 led in console sales. Monopoly Go! generated $2.7 billion alone. U.S. consumer spending on video games totaled $58.7 billion in 2024.

=== Juniors and long term effects ===
The layoffs affected junior staff in greater numbers than other skill levels, and in some cases juniors were specifically targeted. As the industry was recruiting too few juniors to begin with, there are long term concerns for skills development, diversity, and the viability of the games industry as a career path for young developers. The layoffs were demoralising for juniors, and around a third of those who were laid off left the industry entirely. A level designer interviewed by PC Gamer commented that "As a Junior who put blood, sweat, and tears into obtaining my first role in the industry, I am now back again going in circles looking for roles that are junior level (which is non-existent as every job posting I see is either Senior, Principal, or Lead)."

The number of junior positions available has been low for years, but fell dramatically during the period. In 2022, 9.4% of available games jobs in the United Kingdom were at the junior level. By 2023 this had fallen to 2.9%, with only 34 junior positions nationwide over the year. The junior figure had partially recovered to 7% by 2024, but there were no apprenticeships sector wide for the entire year. The few junior jobs available are fiercely competed for; XR Games advertised for four junior positions in 2024 and received 18,000 applications. Grads in Games, a major route into the industry for juniors in the UK, was placed on hiatus in 2024 due to the lack of entry level hiring. Industry support for the program had been in place for a decade but now "just doesn't exist".

The industry's failure to hire and train new workers is exacerbating existing skills shortages at the senior level, as there are not enough staff progressing through the field and moving up to higher positions. A developer interviewed by DigiDay remarked that by recruiting only existing senior level talent, there may be "no new generation of seniors." In the UK in particular, the first wave of developers are now starting to retire, leaving fewer senior staff to train any new juniors. The current skills structure in the UK games industry is unsustainable.

As juniors are more likely to be women or from minority groups such as LGBT demographics, this practice has also had a negative effect on diversity in the industry.

== See also ==
- Impact of the COVID-19 pandemic on the video game industry
- Video games in the United States
- Video game crash of 1983
- List of largest video game mergers and acquisitions
