= List of largest video game companies by revenue =

This is a listing of top 50 largest video game publishers and developers ranked by reported revenue. Tencent is the world's largest video game company, followed by Sony Interactive Entertainment, Xbox, Nintendo, and NetEase.

Of the 50 largest video game companies, 9 are based in the United States, 9 in Japan, 9 in China, 7 in South Korea, and 14 in other countries: 3 from France, 2 from Israel, 2 from Ireland, 2 from Singapore, and 1 each from the United Kingdom, Belgium, Hong Kong, Turkey, Sweden, Australia, and Switzerland.

This list primarily includes public companies or those whose revenues are known. Certain major privately held companies not included because they do not publicly disclose detailed financial statements or revenue reports.

== Companies ==
Rank	Company	Headquarters	Revenue (USD$)	Ref.
1	Tencent Interactive Entertainment	Shenzhen, China	▲$35.7 billion	
2	Sony Interactive Entertainment	(United States) San Mateo, California	▲$29.9 billion	
3	Xbox	(United States) Redmond, Washington	▼$21.8 billion	
4	Nintendo	Minami-ku, Kyoto, Japan	▲$14.5 billion	
5	NetEase Games	Hangzhou, China	▲$13.2 billion	
6	Electronic Arts	(United States) Redwood City, California	▲$8.0 billion	
7	Take-Two Interactive	(United States) New York City, New York	▲$6.7 billion	
8	Valve Corporation	(United States) Kirkland, Washington	▲$6.5 billion (estimate)	
9	Epic Games	(United States) Cary, North Carolina	▲$6.0 billion (estimate)	
10	Roblox Corporation	(United States) San Mateo, California	▲$4.9 billion	
11	miHoYo	Shanghai, China	▲$4.2 billion (estimate)	
12	Bandai Namco Entertainment	Minato, Tokyo, Japan	▲$3.2 billion	
13	Scopely	(United States) Culver City, California	▲$3.0 billion (estimate)	
14	Nexon	Minato, Tokyo, Japan	▲$3.0 billion	
15	Sega	Shinagawa, Tokyo, Japan	▲$3.0 billion	
16	Garena	Singapore	▲$2.9 billion	
17	Playtika	Herzliya, Israel	▲$2.75 billion	
18	Century Games	Beijing, China	▲$2.73 billion (estimate)	
19	Aristocrat Gaming	Sydney, Australia	▲$2.66 billion	
20	37Games	Shanghai, China	▼$2.32 billion	
21	Krafton	Gangnam District, Seoul, South Korea	▲$2.3 billion	
22	Konami Digital Entertainment	Chūō, Tokyo, Japan	▲$2.27 billion	
23	Dream Games	Istanbul, Turkey	▲$2.25 billion (estimate)	
24	Playrix	(Republic of Ireland) Dublin, Ireland	▼$2.13 billion (estimate)	
25	Funfly	Singapore	▲$2.1 billion (estimate)	
26	Tripledot Studios	(United Kingdom) London, England	▲$2.0 billion	
27	Netmarble	Seoul, South Korea	▲$2.0 billion	
28	NC	Pangyo, South Korea	▲$2.0 billion	
29	Square Enix	Shinjuku, Tokyo, Japan	▼$1.83 billion	
30	Moon Active	Tel Aviv, Israel	▲$1.75 billion (estimate)	
31	Ubisoft	Saint-Mandé, France	▼$1.74 billion	
32	Embracer Group	Karlstad, Sweden	▼$1.62 billion	
33	Cygames	Shibuya, Tokyo, Japan	▲$1.37 billion	
34	Capcom	Chūō-ku, Osaka, Japan	▲$1.2 billion	
35	NetDragon Websoft	Fuzhou, China	▲$1.11 billion	
36	Wizards of the Coast	(United States) Renton, Washington	▲$1.0 billion	
37	Smilegate	Pangyo, South Korea	▼$960 million	
38	Papergames	Suzhou, China	▲$850 million (estimate)	
39	Perfect World	Beijing, China	▼$800 million	
40	Keywords Studios	(Republic of Ireland) Leopardstown, Ireland	▲$780 million	
41	Voodoo	Paris, France	▲$780 million	
42	Kakao Games	Jeju, South Korea	▼$725 million	
43	FunPlus	Zurich, Switzerland	▲$594 million (estimate)	
44	Kingsoft	Beijing, China	▲$584 million	
45	Koei Tecmo	Nishi-ku, Yokohama, Japan	▼$583 million	
46	LilithGames	Hong Kong	▼$528 million	
47	Com2uS	Seoul, South Korea	▼$490 million	
48	Wemade	Seongnam, South Korea	▼$433 million	
49	Larian Studios	Ghent, Belgium	▲$447 million	
50	Gameloft	Paris, France	▲$350 million	

== See also ==
- List of video game publishers
- List of largest video game employers
