= Perfect Dark (cancelled video game) =

Cancelled video game

- Developers: The Initiative; Crystal Dynamics
- Publisher: Xbox Game Studios
- Series: Perfect Dark
- Engine: Unreal Engine 5
- Platforms: Windows; Xbox Series X/S
- Release: Cancelled
- Genres: First-person shooter, stealth
- Mode: Single-player

Perfect Dark is a cancelled first-person shooter game that was under development by The Initiative and Crystal Dynamics for Windows and Xbox Series X/S. As a reboot of the Perfect Dark series, the game aimed to revitalize the franchise with modern gameplay mechanics and a new narrative. Set in a near-future world grappling with environmental collapse, players would have stepped into the role of agent Joanna Dark, navigating a world where megacorporations conceal secrets amidst efforts to restore ecological balance.

Announced at The Game Awards in 2020, Perfect Dark was the first project by The Initiative, a first-party team established by Xbox Game Studios in 2018. Production was slowed by various problems, including significant personnel turnover and creative differences. A gameplay trailer was revealed at the Xbox Games Showcase in June 2024. In July 2025, it was announced that the game would cease production and that The Initiative would be closed as part of numerous rounds of layoffs by Microsoft.

== Gameplay ==
The player engaging in combat

Perfect Dark was intended to be a first-person shooter drawing inspiration from immersive sims and stealth games. Players would have had the option to engage in direct combat with enemies or employ stealth tactics, utilizing advanced gadgets for distraction and infiltration. The game features a parkour system, enabling the protagonist, Joanna, to navigate the environment by clambering down pipes and running along walls. Players can eliminate or incapacitate enemies using firearms and melee combat, with Joanna smoothly sliding and running through combat scenarios. The game allows for environmental interaction, such as shooting a fire extinguisher to create a temporary cover cloud.

Stealth was supposed to be a significant component of the gameplay. Players would've been presented with options for how to deal with oncoming encounters and objectives, such as choosing to sneak past adversaries or using high-tech gadgets to deceive them. Joanna's HUD would have provided capabilities such as seeing enemies through walls and scanning them for details. Additionally, her voice analysis tool was intended to be capable of mimicking an enemy's voice to open voice-activated locks or distract foes with false communications. Perfect Dark would've followed a more linear, mission-based structure as opposed to open-world gameplay. The game's parkour mechanics were meant to enable Joanna to perform actions such as wall running, scaling buildings, and sliding along scaffolding, which would have enabled her to access otherwise unreachable locations.

== Premise ==
Perfect Dark is set in a near-future world experiencing environmental collapse, with megacorporations attempting to address the crisis while concealing their own secrets. Players assume the role of agent Joanna Dark, a skilled operative seeking to uncover the truth behind these events. According to an article on Xbox Wire, the game's setting involves significant ecological disasters, collectively referred to as "The Cascade," causing widespread devastation on Earth. Core Mantis, a megacorporation, creates The GEN Network and deploys it in Cairo, Egypt, successfully restoring the region's ecosystem and making it habitable once again. Following this success, other major companies also get involved, but hidden agendas are at play. This reimagined futuristic version of Cairo serves as the main setting for the game.

The protagonist, Joanna Dark, is a special operative working for the megacorporation dataDyne. The character is portrayed through performance capture by actress Alix Wilton Regan, with her facial likeness based on model Elissa Bibaud. Joanna is proficient in firearms, advanced gadgets, stealth, and close-quarters combat. Her mission involves investigating and capturing Daniel Carrington, the world's most wanted criminal, who is hiding in the restored city of Cairo with a radioactive device. Despite her expertise, Joanna is not infallible, and part of the game's narrative focuses on her growth and learning from her mistakes, reflecting the aspirational nature of the game's title.

== Development ==
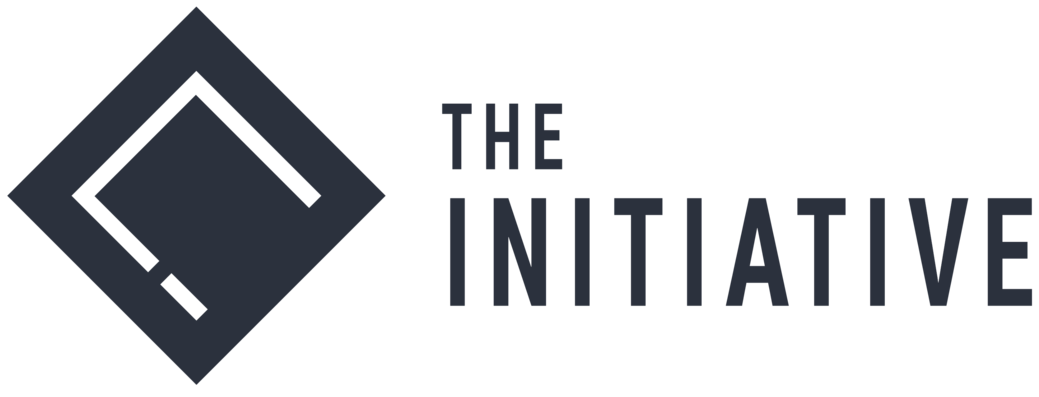
The logo for The Initiative

Perfect Dark was intended to be the debut project by The Initiative, an internally formed first-party team within Xbox Game Studios founded in 2018 and headed by Darrell Gallagher. At its formation, it aimed to create and produce big-budget titles. In addition to Gallagher, the studio recruited several industry veterans, including Christian Cantamessa (writer of Red Dead Redemption) and Brian Westergaard (senior producer of 2018's God of War), as well as talents from BioWare, Naughty Dog, Respawn Entertainment, Santa Monica Studio, Blizzard Entertainment, Insomniac Games and Rockstar Games. Gallagher, who had previously worked on the 2013 Tomb Raider reboot, chose to work on a Perfect Dark reboot after Microsoft presented him with a few opportunities. Plans for the game had already been discussed before Gallagher joined The Initiative, with Xbox head Phil Spencer stating that the game is seen as an opportunity for protagonist Joanna Dark to diversify the Xbox family. According to a source, the game will run on Unreal Engine 4 and feature "various weapons, gadgets, and a camera surveillance system". Design director Drew Murray revealed that the game is being envisioned as a spy shooter, and that the studio wants the player character's physicality to play a bigger role than in traditional first-person shooters. In February 2021, Murray left The Initiative to rejoin Insomniac Games. Shortly afterwards, God of War producer Rhonda Cox joined the company as senior producer for the game.

In September 2021, The Initiative announced they would be partnering with Crystal Dynamics on the game's development. Daniel Neuburger, who had previously directed several Tomb Raider games at Crystal Dynamics, was the game director, until he left The Initiative in February 2022. In the previous 12 months, a substantial number of developers had also left the company, citing a lack of creative autonomy and slow development progress as the reason for their departures. In May 2022, after Embracer Group announced that they had entered an agreement with Square Enix to acquire Crystal Dynamics, The Initiative confirmed that they would still continue to co-develop the game with the studio. In November 2022, Xbox Studios boss Matt Booty revealed that, after the departure of several senior staff members at The Initiative, the Perfect Dark team has been slowly rebuilding while dealing with the challenges of the COVID-19 pandemic and starting up a new studio.

By June 2023, Perfect Dark was still in pre-production and roughly two to three years away from release. It was also revealed that Certain Affinity was involved in its development before The Initiative announced that they would co-develop the game with Crystal Dynamics. Due to multiple factors, including poor management and creative differences between both studios, progress on the game stalled. In 2022, after The Initiative partnered with Crystal Dynamics, development restarted under Unreal Engine 5 and was a bit more productive. There are plans for the game to follow an episodic format, but it could still change before release. It was also reported that The Coalition has been supporting both studios with their Unreal Engine expertise. Grant Kirkhope, who composed most of the original Perfect Dark score, expressed his desire to work on the game, but a new composer was chosen instead. In October 2024, it was reported that former Insomniac Games developer Brian Horton had left the studio, where he was acting as creative director on Marvel's Wolverine, to join The Initiative as Perfect Dark's new creative director over the summer.

=== Cancellation ===
In July 2025, it was announced that The Initiative would be closed, and that development of the project would be stopped as part of several rounds of layoffs by Microsoft. Joanna Dark actress Alix Wilton Regan called for fans to "speak up if [they] wanna see Perfect Dark survive", while actor Elias Toufexis, who voiced Adam Jensen in the Deus Ex series, said the cancellation resulted in a loss of "thousands of dollars" that he was expecting for his role in the game. EA Japan's general manager Shaun Noguchi expressed concerns about the numerous layoffs and the cancellation of Perfect Dark and Rare's Everwild, which had been in development for roughly seven and eight years respectively, stating: "That's a decade of work, potentially a quarter of someone's entire career completely lost. Even if the final product isn't what people originally expected, I think it still deserves to ship. Something is better than nothing for both the team and for the players. But also, don't announce games when they're still half baked." Xbox co-creator Seamus Blackley echoed similar sentiments, "Think of the number of great games that had troubled development histories. All of them? Now consider how often executives cancel troubled games. Smooth development comes only when you take no risks. Greatness comes only when great risks are braved."

In September 2025, it was reported that Microsoft briefly held talks with Take-Two Interactive regarding the latter taking over development funding and publishing duties in an effort to revive the game, but said talks fell through due to disputes over ownership of the game and property, which in part led to additional layoffs at Crystal Dynamics. Wilton Regan later revealed that she had recorded entire chapters of the game's universe before its cancellation, and that Crystal Dynamics suffered considerable job losses. In July 2026, it was reported that Id Software, a developer under Xbox's ZeniMax Media subsidiary, had pitched a separate Perfect Dark game to Microsoft, but was rejected due to new CEO Asha Sharma's wish to orient all of its first-party developers towards prioritizing proven tentpole franchises.

== Marketing ==
Although work on a Perfect Dark revival was rumored in early 2018, Perfect Dark was officially announced at The Game Awards 2020 with a cinematic trailer, after development on the game had been hinted by some sources earlier that year. A gameplay trailer was revealed at the Xbox Games Showcase on June 9, 2024. After the game was cancelled, former level designer Adam McDonald confirmed that most of the game mechanics showcased in the demo were not scripted, though the gameplay systems were still in a rudimentary stage.
