= List of largest video game employers =

This is a listing of top 30 largest video game publishers and developers by number of employees. Ubisoft is the largest video game employer in the industry, followed by Electronic Arts and Xbox.

Some companies, such as Tencent, Valve, Warner Bros. Games, and others, do not publicly disclose how many employees work specifically in their interactive entertainment or gaming divisions.

== Worldwide ==
Rank	Publisher	Country	Employees	Ref
1	Ubisoft	France	16,590	
2	Electronic Arts	United States	14,500	
3	Xbox	United States	14,000	
4	Take-Two Interactive	United States	12,909	
5	Sony Interactive Entertainment	United States, Japan	12,100	
6	Keywords Studios	Ireland	11,141	
7	Nintendo	Japan	8,666	
8	Nexon	South Korea, Japan	7,067	
9	NetEase Games	China	6,500	
10	Embracer Group	Sweden	6,090	
11	MiHoYo	China	6,000	
12	Square Enix	Japan	4,712	
13	Perfect World	China	4,500	
14	Epic Games	United States	4,000	
15	NCSoft	South Korea	3,900	
16	Playtika	Israel	3,800	
17	Virtuos	Singapore	3,500	
18	Capcom	Japan	3,332	
19	NetDragon	China	3,300	
20	Tencent	China	3,000	
21	Netmarble	South Korea	3,000	
22	Sega	Japan	2,922	
23	Tripledot Studios	United Kingdom	2,500	
24	Roblox Corporation	United States	2,474	
25	Koei Tecmo	Japan	2,384	
26	Gameloft	France	2,366	
27	Konami Digital Entertainment	Japan	2,094	
28	Scopely	United States	2,000	
29	Bandai Namco Entertainment	Japan	1,950	
30	Krafton	South Korea	1,675	

== See also ==
- List of largest video game publishers by revenue
- List of video game publishers
- List of video game developers
