= Odyssey (cancelled video game) =

- Teaser art of the game. At the time, it was called "Unannounced Survival Game".
- Developer: Blizzard Entertainment
- Platforms: Windows, console
- Release: Cancelled
- Genre: Survival

Odyssey was the project name for a cancelled Blizzard Entertainment survival game. Meant to be the first new Blizzard IP since Overwatch, it began development in 2017, and concept art of its setting depicted portals between modern-day Earth and a fairytale world. Developed for Windows and console, gameplay was to feature large maps of up to 100 players at once. It was ultimately cancelled in 2024 following the acquisition of Activision Blizzard by Microsoft as part of a reorganization that resulted in layoffs of 8% of the company's gaming staff. At the time of its cancellation, it had a 200-person development team. Reasons behind its cancellation included a switch away from Unreal Engine due to its limitations on online player count, which ultimately stymied development, as well as employee turnover and turmoil due to the fallout of a sexual harassment scandal.

== Development ==
Odyssey started as a pitch from Craig Amai in 2017, and he became project lead in July 2017. It was conceived to be similar to a more polished version of popular survival games such as Minecraft and Rust, containing "vast" maps supporting up to 100 players. Due to the ambitious map size, the game's engine was switched from Unreal Engine, in which it was prototyped, to Synapse, an internally-developed engine created specifically for Odyssey and envisioned as something that would be shared by multiple projects. However, the switch led to significant problems—due to delays, Blizzard's artists were forced to continue prototyping in Unreal, knowing their work would later be discarded.

The game was teased in 2022, upon which time it was already in a playable state and undergoing testing. At the time, it was simply called "Unannounced Survival Game". Details about the game were given in the form of a developer recruitment news item, accompanied by two pieces of artwork, depicting an "ax-wielding ranger wearing an animal skull-shaped helmet and light armor" in a fantasy world with a portal to a more modern one, and "a pair of teenagers in a modern-day city environment stumbling upon a fantasy world". It was announced for "PC and console", which Jessica Conditt of Engadget speculated could refer solely to the Xbox given Microsoft's impending buyout. Despite the development problems, numerous current and former Blizzard employees expressed excitement for the game on social media when it was revealed to the public.

At the time of the Microsoft acquisition, team members remained hopeful they would be allowed to switch back to Unreal Engine due to Microsoft's stance on allowing game leads rather than executives choose the technology used. While the game was positively received by testers, however, there was estimated to be several years of development time remaining on the project, with even a 2026 release seeming overly optimistic. The news of the game's cancellation was announced by Microsoft in a company-wide email in late January 2024. Some of the former team members from Odyssey were moved to other projects in development, though a significant portion were laid off.

== Reception ==
In 2022, Tyler Wilde of PC Gamer speculated that the survival genre "may not be the same" upon the game's release, due to Blizzard games' tendency to be transformative to entire genres. Morgan Park of the same publication stated that he believed Blizzard would make mundane tasks that were a "janky chore" in other similar games more fun. Extrapolating from the game's concept art, Wilde stated his belief that the game would be a portal fantasy with potential transfer of technology between worlds. Lauren Morton, also of PC Gamer, said that she hoped that Blizzard would bring "a real plot" to the genre.

Ali Jones of GamesRadar+ responded to the cancellation of Odyssey by calling it "a sign of Blizzard, Microsoft, and perhaps the AAA industry as a whole utterly failing to adapt to one of the greatest genre successes of the last 20 years". Noting that Palworld was currently the most popular game on Steam, despite being "somewhat janky" and "arguably derivative", he called the decision to cancel the comparatively more polished Odyssey "baffling", and was astonished that the technical problems surrounding its development would be ignored in a manner that left the game to fail. He described it as "indicative of the AAA industry's lack of respect or appreciation for one of the most successful genres in the world". Criticizing AAA publishers as "increasingly risk-averse", he concluded that they failed to see the promise in a genre that consistently exceeded expectations and ruined the chances for a "Blizzard-grade survival game".
