= List of mergers and acquisitions by Embracer Group =

Embracer Group is a Swedish video game holding company controlled by Lars Wingefors. In 2016, the company was spun out of Nordic Games Group and in 2019 it was renamed Embracer Group.

As of December 2025, they own more than 55 internal studios in nearly 30 countries in Europe and the Americas. Its subsidiaries are organized under six groups: CDE Entertainment, Dark Horse Media, DECA Games, Embracer Freemode, Plaion and THQ Nordic. Each group has its own operations, subsidiaries and development studios.

== Acquisitions ==
Date	Company	Country	Parent company	Value	Ref.
August 2017	Black Forest Games	Germany	THQ Nordic	€1,360,000	
August 2017	Pieces Interactive	Sweden	THQ Nordic	$350,000	
November 2017	Experiment 101	Sweden	THQ Nordic	$8,900,000	
February 2018	Koch Media: Dambuster Studios; Fishlabs; Volition	Austria/Germany: United Kingdom; Germany; United States	Plaion	$149,000,000	
July 2018	HandyGames	Germany	THQ Nordic		
November 2018	Coffee Stain Holding: Coffee Stain Studios; Coffee Stain North (60%); Ghost Ship Games (35%); Lavapotion (60%); Other Tales Interactive (20%)	Sweden: Sweden; Sweden; Denmark; Sweden; Denmark	Coffee Stain Holding	$34,900,000	
November 2018	Bugbear Entertainment (90%)	Finland	THQ Nordic		
February 2019	18Point2	Australia	Plaion	€1,900,000	
February 2019	Warhorse Studios	Czech Republic	Plaion	€42,800,000	
May 2019	Piranha Bytes	Germany	THQ Nordic		
August 2019	KSM	Germany	Plaion		
August 2019	Gaya Entertainment	Germany	Plaion		
August 2019	Milestone	Italy	Plaion	€44,900,000	
August 2019	Gunfire Games	United States	THQ Nordic		
August 2019	Goodbye Kansas Game Invest: Fall Damage (50%); Framebunker (21%); Kavalri (21%); Neon Giant (24%); Palindrome Interactive (50%)	Sweden: Sweden; Denmark; Sweden; Sweden; Sweden	Amplifier Game Invest	$3,950,000	
December 2019	Tarsier Studios	Sweden	Amplifier Game Invest	$10,500,000	
February 2020	Saber Interactive: Saber Belarus; Saber Porto; Saber Russia; Saber Spain; Saber Sweden	United States: Belarus; Portugal; Russia; Spain; Sweden	Saber Interactive	$525,000,000	
February 2020	Voxler	France	Plaion	€1,900,000	
May 2020	DestinyBit	Italy	Amplifier Game Invest		
August 2020	4A Games	Malta/Ukraine	Saber Interactive	$45,000,000	
August 2020	New World Interactive	United States	Saber Interactive		
August 2020	Rare Earth Games	Austria	Amplifier Game Invest	€3,300,000	
August 2020	Vermila Studios	Spain	Amplifier Game Invest	€900,000	
August 2020	Palindrome Interactive (remaining 50%)	Sweden	Amplifier Game Invest		
August 2020	Pow Wow Entertainment	Austria	THQ Nordic		
August 2020	DECA Games	Germany	DECA Games	€25,000,000	
August 2020	Sola Media	Germany	Plaion	$2,700,000	
September 2020	Vertigo Games	Netherlands	Plaion	€50,000,000	
November 2020	Flying Wild Hog	Poland	Plaion	$137,000,000	
November 2020	Purple Lamp Studios	Austria	THQ Nordic		
November 2020	Zen Studios	Hungary	Saber Interactive		
November 2020	Snapshot Games	Bulgaria	Saber Interactive		
November 2020	Nimble Giant Entertainment	Argentina	Saber Interactive		
November 2020	34BigThings	Italy	Saber Interactive		
November 2020	Mad Head Games	Serbia	Saber Interactive		
November 2020	Sandbox Strategies	United States	Saber Interactive		
November 2020	A Thinking Ape Entertainment	Canada	DECA Games	$31,000,000	
November 2020	IUGO Mobile Entertainment	Canada	DECA Games		
November 2020	Coffee Stain North (remaining 40%)	Sweden	Coffee Stain Holding		
November 2020	Silent Games	United Kingdom	Amplifier Game Invest		
November 2020	Quantic Lab (95%)	Romania	Amplifier Game Invest	€4,500,000	
February 2021	Gearbox Software: Gearbox Studio Québec	United States: Canada	Gearbox Software	$1,300,000,000	
February 2021	Easybrain	Cyprus/Belarus	Easybrain	$640,000,000	
February 2021	Aspyr	United States	Saber Interactive	$450,000,000	
February 2021	SpringboardVR	United States	Plaion		
May 2021	Kaiko	Germany	THQ Nordic		
May 2021	Massive Miniteam	Germany	THQ Nordic		
May 2021	Appeal	Belgium	THQ Nordic		
May 2021	Frame Break	Sweden	Amplifier Game Invest		
August 2021	3D Realms	Denmark/United States	Saber Interactive		
August 2021	Slipgate Ironworks	Denmark	Saber Interactive		
August 2021	CrazyLabs	Israel	DECA Games		
August 2021	DigixArt	France	Plaion		
August 2021	Force Field	Netherlands	Plaion		
August 2021	Ghost Ship Games (remaining 65%)	Denmark	Coffee Stain Holding		
August 2021	Easy Trigger	Sweden	Coffee Stain Holding		
August 2021	Grimfrost (70%)	Sweden	THQ Nordic		
August 2021	Demiurge Studios	United States	Saber Interactive		
August 2021	Fractured Byte	Estonia	Saber Interactive		
August 2021	SmartPhone Labs	Russia	Saber Interactive		
September 2021	Bytex	Russia	Saber Interactive		
October 2021	Jufeng Studio	China	DECA Games		
October 2021	Splatter Connect	United Kingdom	Plaion		
December 2021	Asmodee: Atomic Mass Games; Bezzerwizzer Studio; Catan Studio; Days of Wonder; Edge Entertainment; Fantasy Flight Games; Gamegenic; The Green Board Game Company; Libellud; Lookout Games; Mixlore; Pearl Games; Plan B Games; Purple Brain; Rebel Studio; Repos Production; Space Cow; Space Cowboys; Unexpected Games; Z-Man Games; Zygomatic	France: United States; Denmark; United States; France; Spain; United States; Germany; United Kingdom; France; Germany; France; Belgium; Canada/Germany; France; Poland; Belgium; France; France; United States; United States; France	Asmodee	€2,750,000,000	
December 2021	Green Tile Digital	Sweden	Amplifier Game Invest		
December 2021	Perfect World Entertainment: Cryptic Studios	China: United States	Gearbox Software	$125,000,000	
December 2021	Spotfilm Networkx	Germany	Plaion		
December 2021	Shiver Entertainment	United States	Saber Interactive		
December 2021	Digic Holdings: Digic Pictures; Digic Services	Hungary: Hungary; Hungary	Saber Interactive		
December 2021	Dark Horse Media: Berger Books (50%); Dark Horse Comics; Dark Horse Entertainment; Dark Horse Games; Dark Horse Manga; DH Press; Kitchen Sink Books (50%); Things From Another World	United States: United States; United States; United States; United States; United States; United States; United States; United States	Dark Horse Media		
February 2022	A Creative Endeavour	Sweden	Amplifier Game Invest		
February 2022	Metricminds	Germany	THQ Nordic		
March 2022	Development Plus Inc.	United States	Plaion		
March 2022	Invisible Walls	Denmark	Amplifier Game Invest		
April 2022	Beamdog	Canada	Saber Interactive		
April 2022	Lost Boys Interactive	United States	Gearbox Software		
May 2022	Assets of Square Enix Europe: Crystal Dynamics; Eidos-Montréal; Square Enix Montréal	United States; Canada; Canada	CDE Entertainment	$300,000,000	
August 2022	Tripwire Interactive	United States	Saber Interactive		
August 2022	Tuxedo Labs	Sweden	Saber Interactive		
August 2022	Middle-earth Enterprises	United States	Embracer Freemode		
August 2022	Limited Run Games	United States	Embracer Freemode		
August 2022	Bitwave Games	Sweden	Embracer Freemode		
August 2022	Gioteck	United Kingdom	Embracer Freemode		
August 2022	Singtrix	United States	Embracer Freemode		
August 2022	Tatsujin	Japan	Embracer Freemode		
October 2022	Anime Limited	United Kingdom / France	Plaion Pictures		
October 2022	VR Distribution	Australia / United Kingdom	Asmodee		
January 2023	Captured Dimensions	United States	Gearbox Software		

== Divestitures ==
Date	Company	Operative group	Buyer	Price	Ref.
November 2019	Foxglove Studios	THQ Nordic	Management buyout		
July 2023	Goose Byte	Amplifier Game Invest	Management buyout		
October 2023	Fall Damage	Amplifier Game Invest	Fragbite	$1,800,000	
November 2023	River End Games	Amplifier Game Invest	Nordcurrent		
February 2024	Saber Interactive: 3D Realms; Digic Pictures; Fractured Byte; Mad Head Games; New World Interactive; Nimble Giant Entertainment; Sandbox Strategies; SmartPhone Labs; Slipgate Ironworks; Stuntworks	Saber Interactive	Beacon Interactive	$247,000,000 (Note: Beacon Interactive has the option to later acquire 4A Games and Zen Studios from Embracer Group, which will raise the total acquisition price to $500 million if exercised.)	
March 2024	Gearbox Software	Gearbox Entertainment	Take-Two Interactive	$460,000,000	
March 2024	Rainbow Studios	THQ Nordic	Management buyout		
May 2024	Shiver Entertainment	Saber Interactive	Nintendo		
November 2024	Easybrain	Easybrain	Miniclip	$1,200,000,000	
November 2025	Arc Games; Cryptic Studios	Freemode	Project Golden Arc	$30,000,000	
December 2025	Anime Limited	Plaion	Toho		
