= Everwild (video game) =

Cancelled video game

- Developer: Rare
- Publisher: Xbox Game Studios
- Director: Gregg Mayles
- Producer: Louise O'Connor
- Designer: Gary Napper
- Artist: Ryan Stevenson
- Composer: Robin Beanland
- Engine: Unreal Engine 5
- Platforms: Windows; Xbox Series X/S
- Genre: Action-adventure

Everwild is a cancelled action-adventure video game developed by Rare that was planned to be published by Xbox Game Studios for Windows and Xbox Series X/S.

== Gameplay ==
Everwild was planned to have a cel-shaded art style set in a vast wilderness.

Everwild had few gameplay details announced upon its initial reveal in 2019, with descriptions of its gameplay varying in the years prior to its cancellation.

In 2020, Everwild was described as a third-person adventure game with no combat, and elements taken from God games, though Rare studio head Craig Duncan would state in a July interview that the team was "still playing around with gameplay ideas".

In 2023, Video Games Chronicle reporter Andy Robinson stated that Everwild would have been "a bit more Viva Piñata than the survival game the earlier trailers hinted at", implying the presence of life simulation game elements.

== Development ==
Development began on Everwild around 2014, and it spent many years in experimental prototyping before being announced. Rare announced a new third-person action-adventure AAA game during the Xbox X019 presentation in November 2019. Gary Napper, who was previously the lead designer for Alien: Isolation, joined Rare as the design director for Everwild.

Video game journalist Jeff Grubb stated in a stream on 12 June 2021 that Everwild had been rebooted since its initial development and was "a ways off", scheduled for approximately 2023. A Video Games Chronicles report on 14 June corroborated the fact that Everwild underwent a "complete reboot" after departure of creative director Simon Woodroffe, but stated that its planned release date had been pushed back to 2024 saying "Everwild's development team is now 'optimistically' targeting a 2024 release."

In October 2024, Everwild development was reported to be going well, with parts of the game being in a playable form. However, in July 2025, Everwild was cancelled along with several other games as a result of broader layoffs within Microsoft.
