= Xbox Series X and Series S =

Home video game consoles

Xbox Series X/S

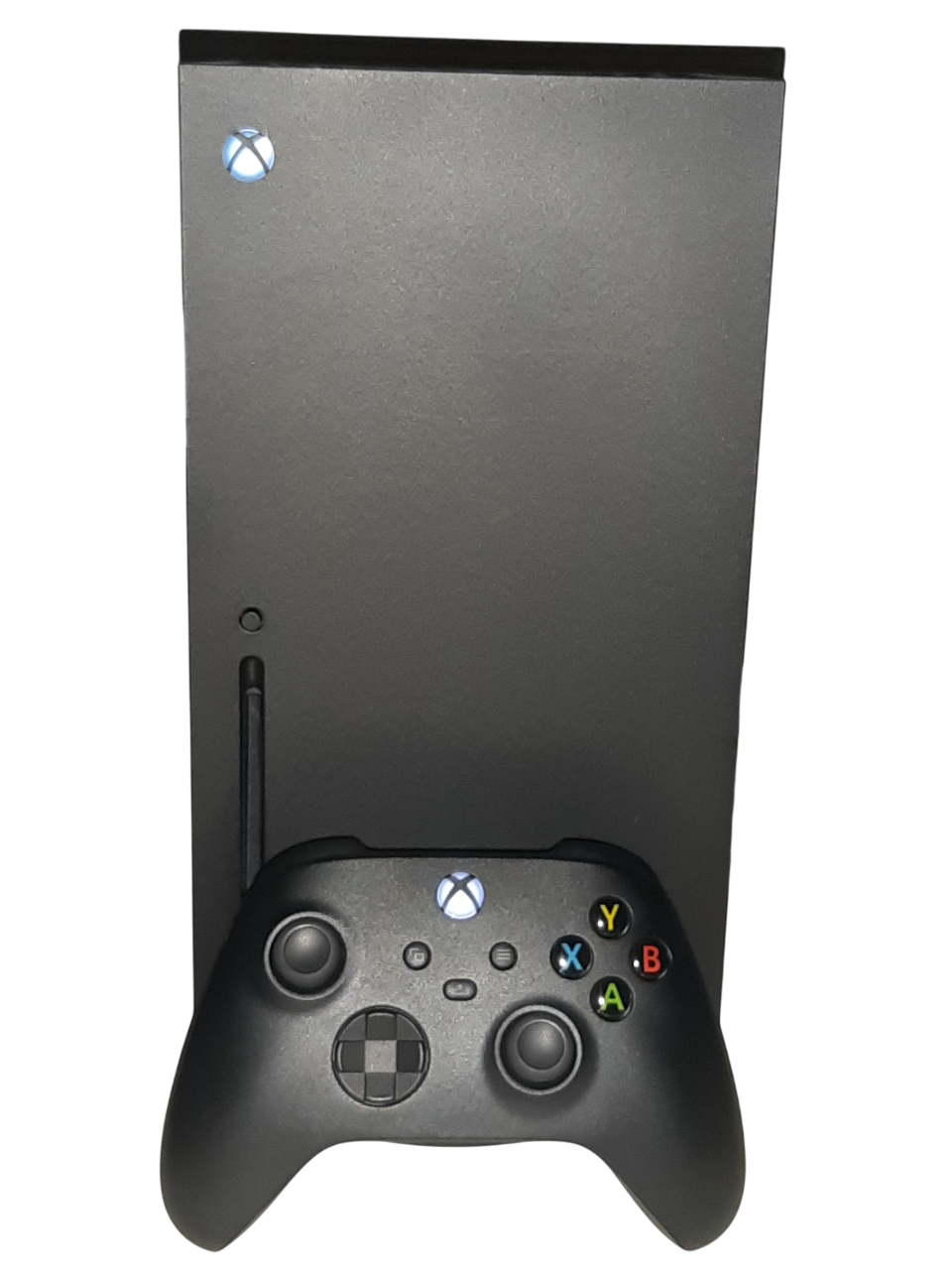
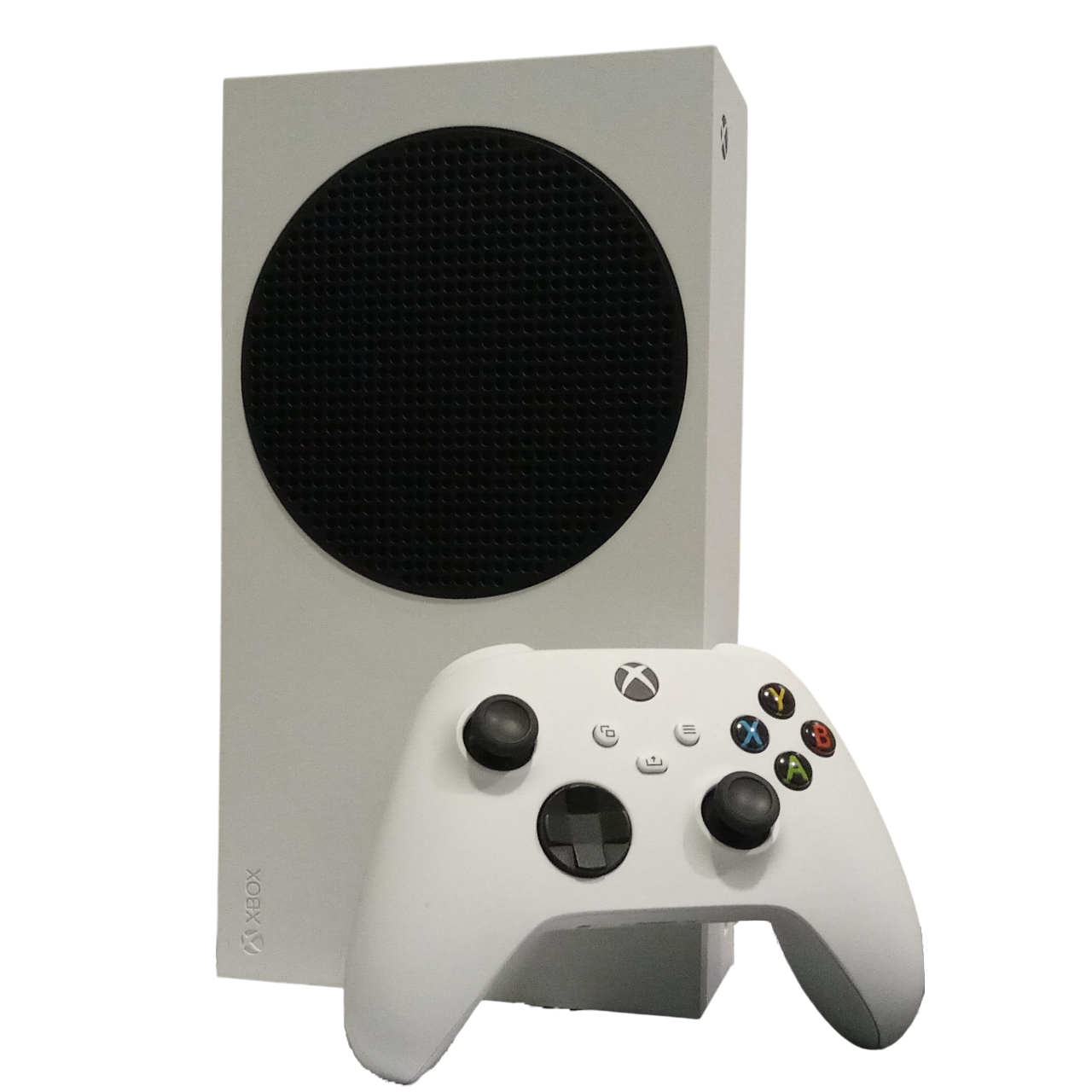
- Left: Xbox Series X with controller Right: Xbox Series S with controller
- Developer: Microsoft
- Manufacturer: Flex; Foxconn
- Product family: Xbox
- Type: Home video game consoles
- Generation: Ninth
- Released: WW: November 10, 2020; CHN: June 10, 2021
- Introductory price: Series X / Series S: US$499.99 / US$299.99; CA$499.99 / CA$299.99; £449.99 / £249.99
- Units sold: 35 million (as of February 25, 2026)
- Media: Series X: Ultra HD Blu-ray, Blu-ray, DVD, CD, Digital distribution; Series S: Digital distribution
- Operating system: Xbox System Software
- CPU: Custom AMD 8-core Zen 2; Series X: 3.8 GHz, 3.66 GHz with SMT; Series S: 3.6 GHz, 3.4 GHz with SMT
- Memory: GDDR6 SDRAM; Series X: 12 GB/192-bit & 4 GB/128-bit (16 GB total); Series S: 8 GB/128-bit & 2 GB/32-bit (10 GB total)
- Storage: WD SN530 NVMe SSD w/ custom ASIC supporting PCIe 4.0 x2; Series X: 1 TB (Black, Halo Edition, SpongeBob Edition, 25th Anniversary Edition) / 2 TB (Galaxy Black Special Edition); Series X All Digital: 1 TB (Robot White); Series S: 512 GB (Robot White) / 1 TB (Carbon Black/Robot White)
- Removable storage: Seagate or Western Digital/Sandisk PCIe 4.0 Storage Expansion Card (up to 4 TB)
- Display: All models: 720p, 1080p, 1440p, 4K
- Graphics: Custom AMD Radeon RDNA 2 architecture; Series X: 52 CUs at 1.825 GHz, 12.155 TFLOPS; Series S: 20 CUs at 1.565 GHz, 4.006 TFLOPS
- Sound: Custom Project Acoustics 3-D Audio; Dolby Atmos; DTS:X; 7.1 surround sound
- Controller input: Xbox Wireless Controller (all revisions); All previously released Xbox One-compatible controllers and accessories (except Kinect)
- Connectivity: Wi-Fi IEEE 802.11ac; Gigabit Ethernet; 3x USB 3.2 Gen 1x1; HDMI 2.1
- Power: Built-in power supply (both consoles)
- Current firmware: 10.0.26100.9662
- Online services: Xbox network, Xbox Game Pass
- Dimensions: Series X: 15.1 cm × 15.1 cm × 30.1 cm (5.9 in × 5.9 in × 11.9 in); Series S: 15.1 cm × 6.5 cm × 27.5 cm (5.9 in × 2.6 in × 11 in)
- Weight: Series X: 9.8 pounds (4.4 kg); Series S: 4.25 pounds (1.93 kg)
- Backward compatibility: All Xbox One games and select Xbox 360 and original Xbox games (Note: Excluding Kinect-required games)
- Predecessor: Xbox One
- Website: xbox.com/consoles

The Xbox Series X and Xbox Series S are the fourth generation of consoles in Microsoft's Xbox series, succeeding the previous generation's Xbox One. Released on November 10, 2020, the higher-end Series X and lower-end Series S are part of the ninth generation of video game consoles, they competed primarily against Sony's PlayStation 5, released the same month.

Like the Xbox One, PlayStation 4 and 5, the consoles use an x86-64 APU by AMD. Both models have solid-state drives to reduce loading times, support for hardware-accelerated ray-tracing and spatial audio, the ability to convert games to high-dynamic-range rendering using machine learning (Auto HDR), support for HDMI 2.1 variable refresh rate and low-latency modes, and updated controllers. Xbox Series X was designed to nominally render games in 2160p (4K resolution) at 60 frames per second (FPS). The lower-end, digital-only Xbox Series S, which has reduced specifications and does not include an optical drive, was designed to nominally render games in 1440p at 60 FPS, with support for 4K upscaling and ray tracing. Xbox Series X/S are backward-compatible with nearly all Xbox One-compatible games and accessories (including Xbox 360 and original Xbox games that were made backward-compatible with Xbox One); the newer hardware gives games better performance and visuals. At launch, Microsoft encouraged a "soft" transition between generations, similar to PC gaming, offering the "Smart Delivery" framework to allow publishers to provide upgraded versions of Xbox One titles with optimizations for Xbox Series X/S.

Critics praised the Xbox Series X/S for the hardware improvements over the Xbox One and Microsoft's emphasis on cross-generation releases but believed that the games available at launch did not fully use the hardware capabilities. Xbox Series consoles are estimated to have sold over 35 million units worldwide as of February 2026.

== History ==
Industry rumors of new Xbox hardware had started as early as June 2018, with Microsoft's Phil Spencer confirming they were "deep into architecturing the next Xbox consoles" at that time. The hardware was believed to be a family of devices under the codename "Scarlett", including a low-cost version following a similar scheme as the Xbox One family of consoles, with major emphasis on game streaming and backward compatibility. By March 2019, further industry rumors had led to speculation of two consoles within the Scarlett family under codenames "Anaconda" and the low-cost "Lockhart" version.

Microsoft confirmed Project Scarlett at its E3 2019 press conference. Microsoft said they wanted a "soft" transition from Xbox One to Scarlett, with Scarlett supporting backward compatibility with all games and most hardware supported on the Xbox One. During a presentation at The Game Awards 2019, Microsoft officially revealed the design of Scarlett and its branding, "Xbox Series X", as well as a late 2020 release date. After the event, a Microsoft spokesperson said the Xbox Series X was a fourth generation of Xbox hardware, which would be branded simply "Xbox" with no subtitle.

Microsoft planned to detail the hardware specifications and launch games for the Series X at the 2020 Game Developers Conference (GDC) and E3 2020, but the events were cancelled due to the COVID-19 pandemic. Microsoft scheduled online presentations over the same days in March 2020, while the company planned to reschedule its E3 presentation. Detailed specifications were presented by Microsoft, Digital Foundry, and Austin Evans of Overclock Media on March 16, 2020. Starting in May and running until launch, Microsoft planned to have more digital events around the Xbox Series X and its games as part of an "Xbox 20/20" series. This included an Xbox Games Showcase on July 23, 2020, featuring games principally from its first-party Xbox Game Studios.

On July 16, 2020, Microsoft announced that it had ended production of the Xbox One X and all-digital version of the Xbox One S in preparation for the new products.

The existence of the Xbox Series S had been guessed before E3 2019, based on a "Project Lockhart", a second, lower-end console that accompanied Scarlett. Confirmation of the Xbox Series S naming was affirmed through early Xbox hardware accessories that some had been able to purchase. Microsoft officially announced the Series S console on September 8, 2020, revealing that it would also be released alongside the Series X in November 2020. Microsoft pointed out that the Series S had been discreetly placed in the background of previous Xbox announcement videos featuring Phil Spencer during July 2020.

During Gamescom 2023, Spencer stated that Microsoft was unlikely to produce a mid-generation revision of either the Series X or Series S, as it would likely cause issues with specifications for games between the first such units and mid-generation ones. Instead, he said that "that when we do hardware, it should have a reason to exist that is demonstrably different than what came before", and that likely their next hardware would be for the future tenth generation of consoles.

In 2024, Microsoft announced new Xbox Series consoles: a 2TB Galaxy Black Special Edition Xbox Series X at US$599.99, a 1TB All-Digital Series X at $449.99 and a 1TB white Xbox Series S at $349.99. All were released on October 15.

As the effects of global tariffs and RAM shortage, the price of Xbox consoles kept increasing since 2025. In the US, the Xbox Series X increased from $499.99 to $649.99 and the Xbox Series S increased from $299.99 to $399.99. The 2TB Xbox Series X increased to $799.99, the 1TB All-Digital Series X increased to $599.99 and the 1TB white Xbox Series S increased to $449.99.

During the Xbox Games Showcase 2026, Microsoft announced the Xbox Series X25 Limited Edition, made to commemorate the 25th anniversary of the release of the original Xbox. It includes a transparent green design, the Xbox Wireless Controller X25 Special Edition, an engraved console number, and Halo: Campaign Evolved. Only 25,000 units were made. Preorders began on August 27, 2026, and sold out within seconds. The controller was released on October 20, 2026, and the console was released on November 12.

On August 1, 2026, Microsoft once again raised Xbox Series X and Series S prices, with the increases proving steeper in Europe and the United Kingdom than in the United States. In EU, the 512 GB Xbox Series S rose to €499.99 and the 1 TB model to €599.99, while the digital-only Xbox Series X rose to €749.99 and the disc-equipped model to €799.99. The company attributed the increases to rising memory and storage component costs, driven in part by demand from the AI industry, and confirmed it was discontinuing the 2 TB Xbox Series X configuration.

== Hardware ==
When Microsoft's Xbox development team started work on the successor to the Xbox One consoles around 2016, they had already envisioned the need to have two console versions, similar to their Xbox One X and Xbox One S models, to meet the needs of different markets. By developing both units in concert, they would be able to make sure games developed would be able to be played on both systems without exception. As has been tradition with past Xbox projects, the consoles were given code names based on cities. The Xbox Series S was named Project Lockhart, based on the city of Lockhart, Texas, which Aaron Greenberg said was known as "the little city with the big heart".

For the high-end console, the Xbox Series X, Microsoft's primary goals were to at least double the graphical performance of the Xbox One X as measured by its floating point operations per second (FLOPS), and to increase CPU performance four-fold compared to Xbox One X while maintaining the same acoustic performance from the Xbox One consoles. As the engineers collected power requirements to meet these specifications, they saw these parts would draw a large amount of internal power (approximately 315 W) and would generate a significant amount of heat. This led to the decision to split the components onto two separate circuit boards; one would house the CPU/GPU, memory, and power regulators, and a second board would act as a Southbridge board for slower input/output (I/O) functions. The boards mounted on opposite sides of an aluminum chassis helped to create air channels for cooling. The remaining components—the heat sink, the electric shielding, the power supply, the optical drive, and the cooling fan—were then arranged in a Tetris-like fashion, according to principal designer Chris Kujawski, to achieve a compact form factor, resulting in the tower-like structure. To meet the acoustics factor, the system includes numerous sensors for controlling the speed of the fan, and the large open top was necessary to ensure good airflow through the system. While certain elements like the optical drive, air flow requirements, and heat sink size fixed certain dimensions in the overall form factor, they were satisfied they were able to end up with a square footprint for the unit.

=== Xbox Series X ===
The Xbox Series X logo

Xbox head Phil Spencer said that Microsoft was prioritizing high frame rates and faster load times over higher resolutions; the Series X achieves this via the better-matched capabilities of the CPU and graphics processing unit. Compared to the Xbox One X, the CPU is about four times as powerful and the GPU is twice as powerful.

The Xbox Series X is powered by a custom 7 nm AMD APU combining Zen 2 CPU and RDNA 2 GPU. The custom Zen 2 CPU with eight cores running at a nominal 3.8 GHz or, when simultaneous multithreading (SMT) is used, at 3.66 GHz. One CPU core is dedicated to the underlying operating system. The integrated GPU is also a custom unit based on AMD's RDNA 2 graphics architecture. It has a total of 56 compute units (CUs) with 3,584 cores, with 52 CUs and 3,328 cores enabled, and runs at a fixed 1.825 GHz. This unit is capable of 12.155 teraflops of computational power. The unit ships with 16 GB of GDDR6 SDRAM, with 10 GB running at 560 GB/s primarily to be used with the graphics system and the other 6 GB at 336 GB/s to be used for the other computing functions. After accounting for the system software, about 13.5 GB of memory is available for games and other applications, with the system software only drawing from the slower pool. The Xbox Series X is intended to render games at 4K resolution at 60 frames per second, and though advertised to support 8K resolution in the future through a firmware update, Microsoft has failed to fulfill this promise.

The Xbox Series X's console form is designed to be unobtrusive and minimalist. It has a 15.1 cm × 15.1 cm (5.9 in × 5.9 in) footprint, is 30.1 cm (11.9 in) high, and weighs 4.45 kg (9.8 lb). Designed to sit vertically, it can also be used on its side. Its front has the main power button and an Ultra HD Blu-ray drive. The top of the unit is a single powerful fan. Spencer said that the console is as quiet as the Xbox One X. The Series X includes an HDMI 2.1 output, the storage expansion slot, three USB 3.2 ports, and an Ethernet port. The console does not include an infrared blaster or HDMI pass-through like the Xbox One line, supporting HDMI-CEC instead. An earlier leak had suggested a TOSLINK port for digital audio, but this was eliminated in the final design. The console has an IR receiver in its controller pairing button next to the front USB port.

=== Xbox Series S ===
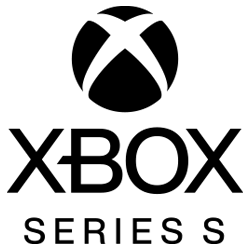
The Xbox Series S logo

The Xbox Series S is comparable in its hardware to the Xbox Series X, similar to how the Xbox One S relates to the Xbox One X, but has less processing power. While it runs the same CPU with slightly slower clock frequencies, it uses a slower GPU, a custom RDNA2 with 20 CUs at 1.55 GHz for 4.006 TFLOPS, compared to 12.155 TFLOPS of the Series X. It ships with 10 GB of GDDR6 SDRAM, with 8 GB running at 224 GB/s primarily to be used with the graphics system and the other 2 GB at 56 GB/s to be used for the other computing functions, and a 512 GB SSD storage unit with a raw input/output throughput of 2.4 GB/s. It does not include an optical drive, so all games and software must be obtained digitally via Microsoft Store. It is intended to render games nominally at 1440p, with support for a 4K upscaler, at 60 frames per second, although it can go as high at 120 frames per second at this resolution. It starts at US$299.99. Selected games can support native 4K resolution output on the Series S, such as Ori and the Will of the Wisps. Otherwise, the console has the same functions as the Xbox Series X, including ports, expansions, and game support.

Microsoft designed the Series S to easily fit inside of a small bag or backpack for portability and travel usage. The Series S unit is about 60% smaller by volume than the Series X, measuring 275 by 151 by 63.5 millimetres (10.83 in × 5.94 in × 2.50 in) in its vertical orientation. In this orientation, its large side surface features the major exhaust port for active air cooling, similar to the top surface of the Series X; additional vents are then located on the top of the Series S. Like the Series X, the front of the Series S features one USB port and a controller pairing button with an integrated IR receiver. The rear of the console includes the power connector, one HDMI port, two additional USB ports, and an Ethernet port. Like the Series X, the Series S can also be placed horizontally with the exhaust port facing upward to maintain airflow. The Series S launched in a matte white case along with a matching controller, distinguishing it from the matte black that the Series X uses.

=== Common features ===
==== Xbox Velocity Architecture ====
The Xbox Velocity Architecture logo

Both consoles use a new storage solution, the Xbox Velocity Architecture, that includes hardware and software components to improve transfer speeds within the console, reduce the size of digital downloads, and give developers more flexibility. Central to this is the internal storage, a custom NVM Express (NVMe) SSD. On the Series X, this is a 1 TB SSD (802 GB available) with a raw input/output throughput of 2.4 GB/s. An on-board compression/decompression block includes both the industry standard zlib decompression algorithm and a proprietary BCPack algorithm geared for game textures, and it gives a combined throughput as high as 4.8 GB/s. Within the software, a new DirectStorage API within DirectX allows developers to fine-tune priority to input/output aspects with other processing threads. The software provides sampler feedback streaming that aids in loading multiple textures in segments to deal with level of detail rendering, rather than having to read these textures as a whole before using them. The Series S includes a 512 GB SSD (364 GB available) with similar custom hardware and software specifications. All SSD storage on the architecture use a PCI Express 4.0 x2 link.

Developers at The Coalition found that, without any changes to their code, Gears 5 loaded four times faster on Xbox Series X than Xbox One X due to the higher throughput on memory and storage and that they would be able to increase this further once they incorporated the new DirectStorage API routines.

The consoles support external storage through a proprietary SSD expansion card inserted into the back of the console, which was manufactured exclusively by Seagate Technology on launch and limited to a 1 TB size when first released. Later versions included 512 GB and 2 TB versions and were released at the end of 2021, while expansion cards manufactured by Western Digital were released in June 2023. 4 TB versions were released by Seagate in June 2025. As with the Xbox One, the consoles also support external USB storage, but only backward compatible games (which can also be transferred directly from an Xbox One console) are able to run directly from external USB storage. Xbox Series X- and S-native games must be stored on the internal SSD or an expansion card in order to be played, but they can be moved to a USB storage device to make room for other games. External storage drives were initially limited to a maximum of 16 TB, but Microsoft removed this limit in 2025, with larger amounts split into partitions.

The DirectStorage API was released in March 2022 for Windows-based computers with graphics cards that support DirectX 12 and NVMe SSDs, though games must be programmed to take advantage of the DirectStorage API. DirectStorage was planned to be a built-in feature along with Auto HDR for Windows 11 at release in late 2021, as well as offered within Windows 10.

==== Video and audio rendering technologies ====
Both the Series X and Series S support real-time ray-tracing and support the new features of the HDMI 2.1 standard including variable refresh rate (VRR) and Auto Low Latency Mode (ALLM) that are currently being incorporated into newer televisions. The console has dedicated audio hardware acceleration. A feature called "audio ray tracing" uses the graphics ray tracing processors to process spatial audio in the same manner to improve the audio immersion for the player.

Another goal for Microsoft was to reduce the effects of input latency to improve responsiveness, adding support for HDMI 2.1 Auto Low Latency Mode and Variable Refresh Rate features, and "dynamic latency input" technology—a new input pathway that allows developers to incorporate potential controller lag into their games.

AMD's FidelityFX Super Resolution, an image upscaling technology competitor to Nvidia's deep learning super sampling (DLSS) to enable higher resolutions and framerates, was added to the Xbox Series X/S in June 2021.

Both consoles support Dolby Vision and Dolby Atmos technologies. Dolby Vision was initially limited to streaming apps at launch, but was released for games in September 2021.

=== Comparison ===
The following table is a comparison of the major components of the fourth generation of Xbox consoles.

Model		Series X			Series S	
Model		2TB Disc Drive Galaxy Black	1TB Disc Drive Carbon Black/Halo Infinite	1TB All-Digital Robot White	1TB All-Digital Robot White/Carbon Black	512GB All-Digital Robot White
APU	CPU	Custom AMD Zen 2; 8 Cores at 3.8 GHz (3.66 GHz with SMT)			Custom AMD Zen 2; 8 Cores at 3.6 GHz (3.4 GHz with SMT)	
APU	GPU	Custom RDNA 2; 52 CUs at 1.825 GHz; 12.155 TFLOPS			Custom RDNA 2; 20 CUs at 1.565 GHz; 4.006 TFLOPS	
Memory		16 GB GDDR6; 10 GB with 192-bit bus (560 GB/s) and 6 GB with 128-bit bus (336 GB/s)			10 GB GDDR6; 8 GB with 128-bit bus (224 GB/s) and 2 GB with 32-bit bus (56 GB/s)	
Storage	Capacity	2TB	1TB			512GB
Storage	Internal	PCIe Gen 4 custom NVMe SSD; 2.4 GB/s raw or uncompressed, 4.8 GB/s compressed				
Storage	Expandable	0.5–4 TB expansion card (rear)				
Storage	External	USB 3.1 external HDD support				
Ultra HD Blu-ray drive		Yes		No		
Performance target		4K resolution at 60 FPS, up to 120 FPS			1440p at 60 FPS, up to 120 FPS	
Dimensions	Size	301 mm × 151 mm × 151 mm (12 in × 5.9 in × 5.9 in)			275 mm × 151 mm × 65 mm (11 in × 5.9 in × 2.6 in)	
Dimensions	Weight	4.46 kilograms (9.8 lb)		3.58 kilograms (7.9 lb)	1.93 kilograms (4.3 lb)	
Colors		Galaxy Black	Carbon Black	Robot White Carbon Black		
Model number			1882		1883	1881
Launch price		US$599 €699 £589; A$999; C$799	US$499 €499 £449; A$749; C$599	US$449 €499 £429; A$699; C$599	US$349 €349 £299; A$549; C$449	US$299 €299 £249; A$499; C$379

=== Xbox Wireless Controller ===
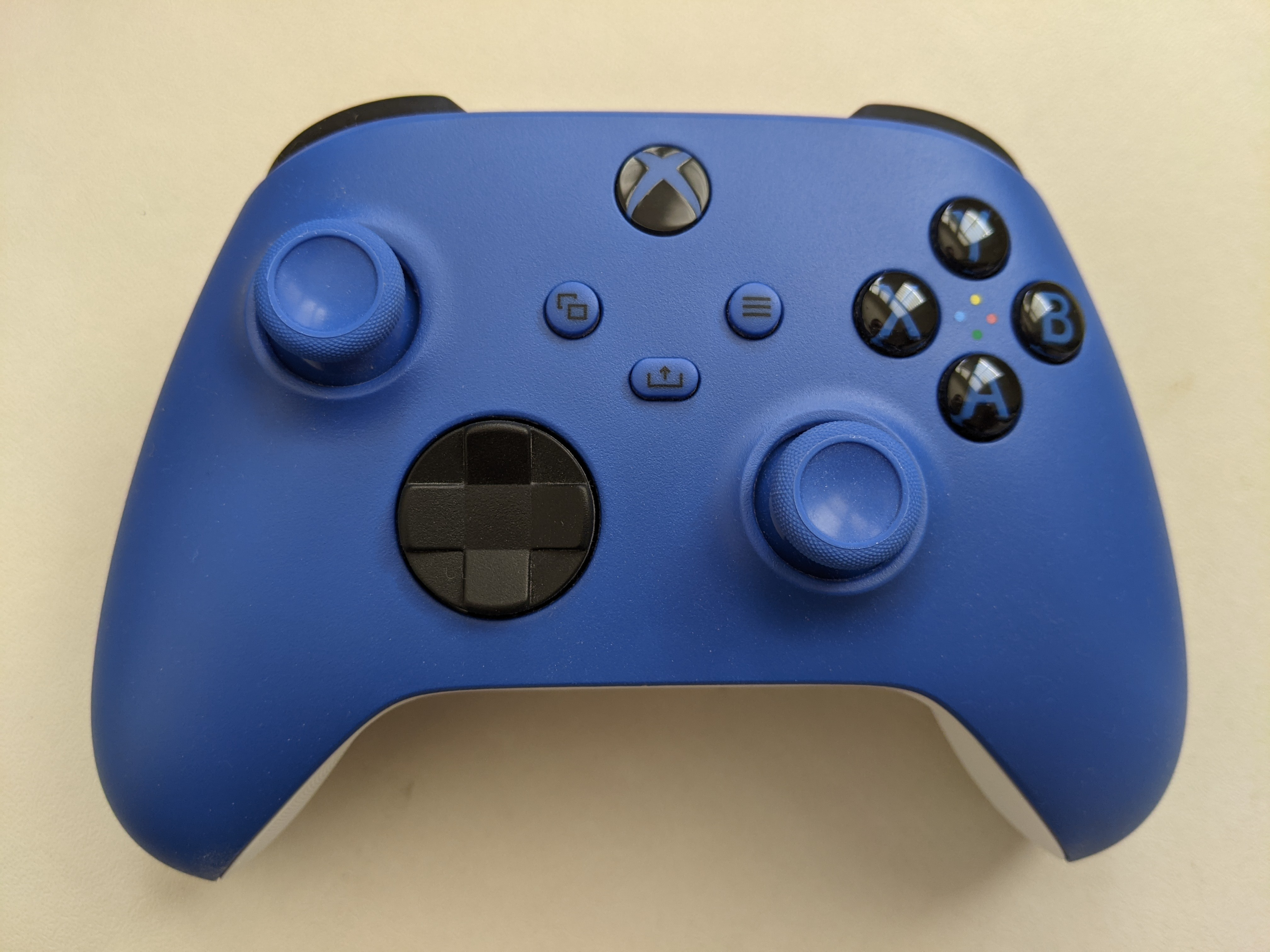
An Xbox Series X/S controller in "Shock Blue"

The Series X and Series S ship with an updated version of the Xbox Wireless Controller intended to fit a larger range of hand sizes. They include same key buttons as the past controllers: two analog joysticks that can be depressed, a D-pad, four action buttons, two system buttons ("View" and "Menu"), the main Xbox home button, two grip triggers (left and right), and two shoulder buttons (left and right). The new controller adds a "Share" button alongside the "View" and "Menu" buttons; pressing "Share" once takes a screenshot, while holding the button begins a Game DVR recording. Additionally, the "Share" button can be remapped using the Xbox Accessories app.

Microsoft found that by aiming the size to fit an eight-year-old's hands, they were able to make the design fit a larger section of the population; it thus features more sculpted grips, and has reduced and rounded trigger buttons. The D-pad is a new concave design that senior console designer Ryan Whitaker said was a means to merge the normal D-pad style on the standard Xbox One controller and the version on the Elite variant to accommodate a range of playstyles. Small tactile dot patterns have been added to the buttons to help players orient fingers on the controls. The controller continues to use two AA batteries, though a rechargeable battery pack is available as an accessory. Microsoft found from focus group studies that players were split nearly 50/50 on the use of batteries versus recharging and thus gave the controller the option to use either.

The controller uses the same wireless protocol introduced by the Xbox One and is backward compatible with existing Xbox One consoles. Existing Xbox One controllers are also compatible with Xbox Series X. The new controller also supports the Bluetooth Low Energy standard allowing it to pair with mobile devices and other hardware supporting that standard, and has internal storage to remember those connections. It uses a USB-C connector for wired use and charging (with the optional battery kit) rather than USB Micro-B.

=== Other accessories ===
Many of the first-party accessories designed to work with the preceding Xbox One remain compatible with the Xbox Series X, including the Xbox Stereo Headset and Xbox Wireless Headset.

Spencer said that the Xbox Series X would likely not have immediate virtual reality (VR) support at launch, and that they expect that any VR support would be based on the Windows Mixed Reality components contained within the console's Windows 10 components, but was otherwise not a focus of the console's development prior to release.

=== Mid-generation refreshes and Limited Editions ===
An updated Xbox Series S with a matte black finish and 1 TB of storage launched on September 1, 2023; the internal design remains otherwise unchanged.

Unrelated court documents from the 2022 court case FTC v. Microsoft included plans for refreshed mid-generation consoles planned to be released in 2024. The updated Xbox Series X, codenamed "Brooklin", would feature a cylindrical design that drops the optical drive, draw less power, increase internal storage to 2 TB, and improve wireless connectivity with Wi-Fi 6E. The updated Xbox Series S, codenamed "Ellewood", would retain the same design as the current Series S, reducing power consumption and adding Wi-Fi 6E and 1 TB of internal storage. Both console refreshes were planned to ship with a new Xbox controller, codenamed "Sebile". The new controller would be named the Xbox Universal Controller and would include a rechargeable, swappable battery.

Microsoft released refreshed versions of both consoles on October 15, 2024, which included a 1 TB Xbox Series S in a white finish, an Xbox Series X in white without the optical drive, and the 2 TB Xbox Series X Galaxy Black Special Edition. The new Series X models use a redesigned motherboard with a smaller system-on-chip, and replace its vapor chamber cooling mechanism with copper heat pipes. The new models were reported to have slightly reduced power consumption.

During the Xbox Games Showcase 2026, Microsoft announced the Xbox Series X25 Limited Edition, made to commemorate the 25th anniversary of the release of the original Xbox. It includes a transparent green design, the Xbox Wireless Controller X25 Special Edition, an engraved console number, and Halo: Campaign Evolved. Only 25,000 units were made. Preorders began on August 27, 2026, and sold out within seconds. The controller was released on October 20, 2026, and the console was released on November 12.

On November 3, 2026, Xbox Wire announced the Xbox Series X-Bite ahead of the release of Grand Theft Auto VI. Crafted by John Nolan Studio, the design features a five-foot-long alligator with green x-shaped irises and a working Xbox Series X inside of it, along with a unique controller with scratch marks. Only one Series X-Bite was made, and was sold after a sweepstakes contest people could enter by reposting the announcement post on X (Twitter), Instagram, or TikTok.

== Software ==
Both consoles have a similar user interface (UI) as the Xbox One, but use 40% less memory to improve its speed. According to the UI development team, the Home section loads in about half the time as it did on the Xbox One. Other changes include adding rounded UI elements, a more-readable font for text elements, rearrangement of certain aligned features, and improvements to the sharing functions. These changes were brought to the Xbox One system software, the Windows' Xbox application, and the Xbox mobile application around September 2020. Based on system previews, about 200 GB of space was reserved on the internal drive of the Xbox Series X for system files.

Xbox Series S and Series X support "Quick Resume", which allows users to suspend and resume up to three games at once. Games can also be resumed after a reboot of the console. The March 2022 update added the ability to "pin" up to two games to Quick Resume, keeping them suspended unless otherwise closed manually, or the game must be updated.

As with previous Xbox consoles, Xbox Series S and Series X use the Xbox network platform for online services. It supports the Xbox Game Pass service, which allows subscribers to download games from an on-demand library. In October 2021, Xbox Cloud Gaming—a component of Xbox Game Pass Ultimate which allows users to stream games from Microsoft servers to Xbox consoles, PCs, and mobile apps—was upgraded from Xbox One S-based hardware to Xbox Series X-based servers, enabling faster server-side loading times.

Apps for various streaming media services are available via Microsoft Store. The Apple TV app was released on Xbox platforms for the first time alongside the Xbox Series S and Series X.

Microsoft allows all retail Xbox Series X and Xbox Series S consoles to use an environment known as 'Dev mode', which provides developers with a sandbox environment to test their games and applications.

== Games ==
The "Optimized for Series X" and "Smart Delivery" logos

At launch of the Xbox Series X/S, Microsoft positioned new games to be available for both the Xbox One and the new consoles. Xbox Game Studios head Matt Booty said that Microsoft wanted to ensure that those who had recently bought Xbox One consoles would still "feel that they made a good investment and that we're committed to them with content." Spencer said many of the Xbox Game Studios subsidiaries were familiar with developing games on personal computers, where there is a wide range of hardware targets to meet. This approach allows the creation of games that perform well on the Xbox One consoles yet take advantage of the new hardware with higher graphics throughput and faster frame rates, ray tracing, and support for the consoles' storage architecture.

For some games, further game improvements from the Xbox One version to Xbox Series X/S version can be made with the capabilities of the Xbox Series X/S console; games with this support are marketed with an "Optimized for Series X" logo. Microsoft offered a distribution framework known as "Smart Delivery" that automatically downloads Xbox Series X/S versions of backwards compatible games for the console when available; Microsoft positioned this feature at publishers who plan to release Series X- or Series S-specific versions of games after releasing on Xbox One and to users moving from an existing Xbox One to an Xbox Series console.

Microsoft does not bar developers from releasing games that can only be played on Xbox Series X/S, but the company has preferred a "soft" transition more in line with PC gaming, where developers can target optimal play on higher-end hardware, but still allow the game to be played with reduced fidelity on lower-end hardware (such as older Xbox One consoles).

Initially, Spencer suggested that their first-party studios' games would support both Xbox One and Xbox Series X platforms for the "next couple of years", but journalists observed that some of the first-party games introduced in the Xbox Game Showcase in July 2020 omitted mention of the Xbox One, and their websites later updated to omit mention of the Xbox One. While none of these games were believed to be launch titles, they were expected to be released within the window Spencer had previously suggested. This led to Aaron Greenberg, general manager of Xbox Games Marketing, to clarify that these games were being developed for the Xbox Series X first, leaving the choice of adding Xbox One support to their development studios as they went forward. In June 2023, Xbox Game Studios head Matt Booty stated that its in-house studios had "moved on to Gen 9" and were no longer working on new games targeting Xbox One.

Microsoft has not placed any similar requirements on a soft transition for third-party developers and publishers, allowing them to offer Xbox Series X exclusives or other routes to upgrade from the Xbox One edition of a game, though Video Games Chronicle reported that Microsoft had urged publishers to keep the upgrade path free if they took that option. CD Projekt RED and Ubisoft have committed to using Smart Delivery for their upcoming releases. Electronic Arts affirmed that Madden NFL 21 would have a free update patch from the Xbox One version to the Xbox Series X version prior to the release of the next Madden NFL game.

The Xbox Game Preview program, which allows games to be released through an early access model, continued into the Xbox Series X/S line with Spacebase Startopia in January 2021.

=== Backward compatibility ===
Microsoft stated that the Xbox Series X and Series S would support all existing games playable on Xbox One (excluding those that require the Kinect sensor), including Xbox 360 and original Xbox games currently supported through backward compatibility on the Xbox One, thus allowing the new consoles to support four generations of games. To achieve this level of compatibility, Microsoft announced in June 2019 that they would no longer be bringing any additional Xbox 360 or original Xbox games into the Xbox One backward compatibility program, and they would instead be using their manpower to make sure these older games were playable on the Xbox Series X. Backward compatibility is a launch feature, with Microsoft having put more than 500,000 man-hours in validating thousands of games from the supported Xbox One library; Spencer said in December 2019 that he himself had been helping to test backward compatibility games. As Microsoft neared launch, they reopened the means for players to suggest additional games to add to backward compatibility, stating "Resurrecting titles from history often presents a complex mix of technical and licensing challenges, but the team is committed to doing everything we can to continue to preserve our collective gaming legacy."

It is possible for advanced graphic processes options not originally programmed into these older games to be worked into the game when played on the console, such as automated high-dynamic-range rendering (HDR) support using machine learning, framerate doubling, 16x anisotropic filtering, and resolution upscale. Work done by the Xbox Advanced Technology Group prior to launch was focused on how far into the backward-compatibility library they could take these improvements, including into original Xbox games, adding in features like HDR or improving the framerate of games that may have been programmed to be locked at a specific framerate. Backward compatible games are supported under the Quick Resume feature as well. Cloud saves can be used to migrate from Xbox One, and Microsoft stated that it would also add free cloud saves to the Xbox 360 so it can be migrated to a Series S/X console as well.

Xbox Series S can play Xbox One games with improved performance, texture filtering, and auto HDR support, but it does not support Xbox One X-specific enhancements. Microsoft is providing tools for developers to check the performance of their Xbox One games on the Series X and S consoles, which can suggest optimizations "as easy as changing three lines of code" to support the improvements in backward compatibility. In February 2021, Microsoft introduced FPS Boost, a feature for select backward-compatible games that the company said can improve the framerate of these titles on the Xbox Series X and Series S by two to four times. This is a feature that Microsoft's engineers must prepare for each game, with five games supported initially and more to be rolled out over time. Microsoft developed FPS Boost after finding that for many backward compatible games, the CPU and GPU on the newer consoles frequently entered their idle states even with the other enhancements in place, and so they sought ways to use the unused processing cycles to further enhance the older games' performance. As of May 2021, about 97 games were updated to support FPS Boost.

In March 2021, Microsoft started testing the Auto HDR feature with Windows-compatible games and computers that meet minimal requirements supported through DirectX.

== Release and promotion ==
In March 2020, Microsoft stated that despite the COVID-19 pandemic, they expected the Xbox Series X to ship by the end of 2020, though they were monitoring supply chains and the safety of their workers. Then, Spencer believed that while the hardware would continue to ship on time, games poised for the release window of Xbox Series X might be delayed due to the pandemic. By August 2020, Microsoft committed to a November 2020 release window for the Xbox Series X, affirming the console's release was still on track.

Both the Xbox Series X and Series S consoles launched on November 10, 2020, with the Series X priced at US$499, £449, and €499 and the Series S priced at US$299, £249, and €299. In China, the systems would release on June 10, 2021. Microsoft affirmed that 31 games would be available at launch, including those from its Xbox Game Studios and from other third-party publishers, in addition to those from its Xbox One backwards compatibility. While Halo Infinite had been planned as a launch title when the Series X console was first revealed, Microsoft and 343 Industries opted to delay its release until after the console's launch due to production issues related to the COVID-19 pandemic.

Microsoft continues its Xbox All-Access financing plans (which bundle the hardware, Xbox Live Gold, and Xbox Game Pass as part of a monthly payment plan) for the Series X. Current All Access plans with the Xbox One include routes to upgrade to the Xbox Series X, and Spencer stated that there would be similar upgrades from the Xbox Series X in the future. The All-Access option for the Xbox Series X option is based on a 24-month plan at US$35 per month while the Series S is based on a US$25 per month plan.

Upon reveal of the Xbox Series X's vertical form factor, a popular Internet meme compared the design to a mini refrigerator. In the lead-up to the console's release, Microsoft manufactured a limited number of refrigerators modeled after the Xbox Series X exterior, complete with a disk drive handle, green interior ambient lighting, and the Xbox startup sound. Some were distributed to celebrities like Snoop Dogg and iJustine, and others were offered as part of promotional contests. In March 2021, in collaboration with Microsoft, Dwayne Johnson offered smaller mini-fridges modeled off the Xbox Series X to promote his line of Zoa Energy drinks; Microsoft's Greenberg stated that this was a trial run to see if the Xbox mini-fridge would have potential sales options beyond this promotion. After followers of the official Xbox Twitter account helped the brand to win in a Twitter marketing vote-based championship in April 2021, Greenberg affirmed that Microsoft would proceed with producing Xbox Series X mini-fridges for purchase. Microsoft announced during E3 2021 that these mini fridges would be available to purchase by end-of-year holiday period in 2021. Microsoft opened pre-orders for the mini-fridge in October 2021, with plans for distribution in December 2021 in North America and European markets.

Microsoft announced a 1 TB Xbox Series S model in carbon black, which was released on September 1, 2023, at a price of US$349.

== Reception ==
At launch, critics praised the new console hardware and commented positively on its improved graphics, reduction of loading times, and strong backward compatibility support, but, due to the lack of any console exclusives, remained hesitant of the console's true power. Because of this, at launch, many did not feel these consoles truly represented the next generation of home consoles. The lack of significant launch-day exclusive titles designed to show off the new hardware capabilities, as well as the familiar controller shape and user interface, was considered by some to be disappointing given the next-generation focus of Sony's PlayStation 5. The Series X was generally considered the better unit when compared to the Series S, as the computation and space limitations of the latter made it a less user-friendly experience to navigate but still otherwise functional. Eurogamer's Richard Leadbetter stated "I love the hardware in terms of what I can potentially experience with it and the expert implementation of many of its forward-looking features—but a console is defined by its games, and in that sense, I still feel that I barely know the machine at all." Keza MacDonald of The Guardian said that while there is no immediate driving force to buy the consoles at launch, "there's not much to criticise: they do everything they promised to do, and they do it well." Gamasutra's Kris Graft and Chris Kerr said that "Microsoft has delivered two highly appealing entry points that can turn players into long-term customers, while at the same time erasing the idea of 'generations,' exposing people to more games, past, present and future."

In November 2021, Jordan Ramée of GameSpot acknowledged that Xbox Series X and S had begun to see higher-profile console-exclusive releases since their launch (such as Forza Horizon 5, and the third-party titles The Artful Escape and The Big Con), and that Smart Delivery was a "crucial" feature of the consoles—praising the system for being seamless and automatic unlike PlayStation 5, whose user interface "did not make it abundantly clear which version of a game you were choosing to download and play, occasionally resulting in players accidentally putting the PS4 version of a game on their PS5." He also felt that migrating from an older Xbox One was easier than migrating from PS4 to PS5, citing Smart Delivery, automatic synchronization of save data, and maintaining the same user interface.

=== Sales ===
Microsoft announced that the Xbox Series X/S was the biggest Xbox console launch, with more consoles sold in more countries in its first 24 hours than any previous Xbox. The record was previously held by the Xbox One, which sold more than one million units at launch. The Xbox Series S has attracted a higher percentage of new Xbox players than any previous Microsoft consoles. Microsoft's CEO, Satya Nadella, would affirm in an earnings call on July 27, 2021, that the Series X and S consoles were the fastest-selling Xbox consoles ever. Microsoft has not revealed the exact sales numbers of the Xbox Series X/S, having last revealed sales figure for Xbox consoles in 2014. However, estimates from industry analysts and exact sales from specific regions are available.

Daniel Ahmed, a Niko Partners analyst, has provided estimates for the worldwide sell-through of the Xbox Series X/S. The combined worldwide sales of the Xbox Series X and Series S would have reached 3.5 million by December 31, 2020. Sales would increase to 6.5 million by June 30, 2021, outpacing the 5.7 million units sold of the Xbox One and the 5 million units of the Xbox 360 in the same timeframe. Sales worldwide are estimated to have reached 8 million by September 30, 2021, and 12 million units by the end of 2021. At the end of 2022, it was estimated by Ampere Analysis that sales had reached 18.5 million. In June 2023, during an ID@Xbox presentation in Brazil, Microsoft revealed that Xbox Series X and Series S had sold over 21 million units to date, which lagged behind its rival PS5 with 40 million units sold as of July 2023.

During the hearing of Activision Blizzard Acquisition on June 22, 2023, Microsoft admitted that they "lost the console wars" and "Xbox's console has consistently ranked third (of three) behind PlayStation and Nintendo in sales. In 2021, Xbox had a market share of 16% ... Likewise for console revenues and share of consoles currently in use by gamers ('installed base'), Xbox trails with 21%".

Certified sales data are available in certain regions through providers, such as GfK in various regions of Europe. Famitsu also provides specific sales estimates in Japan. In the UK, 155,000 units were sold on launch day, two-thirds of which were Xbox Series X consoles. Sales in the region would reach 310,000 by the end of 2020, over 1 million by the end of 2021, and 1.8 million by the end of 2022. The Series X variety accounted for 43% of all the Xbox Series consoles sold over 2021 in the UK. In Japan, 16,247 Xbox Series X and 4,287 Xbox Series S systems were sold during the launch week, for a total of 20,534 units sold. Sales in Japan would cross 116,000 in November 2021, outselling the lifetime Japanese sales of the Xbox One in under a year. By the end of 2022, Xbox Series X/S reached 400,000 units sold in Japan. In Spain, there were 10,500 Xbox Series X and 3,600 Xbox Series S systems sold during the launch week for a combined total of 14,100 units sold. By the end of 2020, 30,850 Xbox Series X and S systems had been sold in Spain. 96,000 units were sold in Spain in 2022.

As of June 2024, the Xbox Series X and Series S have sold a combined 28.3 million units worldwide.

==== Shortages ====
The 2020–2023 global chip shortage prevented Microsoft from producing enough Xbox consoles to meet demand. Upon launch, both models almost immediately sold out across all retailers and in all markets. This led to scalping on Internet marketplace sites, with consoles going for as high as US$5,000. Spencer said that they had gotten a later start on manufacturing the console in mid-2020 as they were waiting for key AMD chip technology, and they had reached full production capacity by launch but were still rushing to meet sales demand, as well as having made projections on proportions of Series X versus Series S sales. In November 2020, Xbox chief financial officer Tim Stuart said shortages were likely to end in the second quarter of 2021. Starting in May 2021, Microsoft allowed members of the Xbox Insiders program to sign up for a priority list to purchase an Xbox Series X or Series S directly from Microsoft, though only a limited number of units were offered through this program. Although Microsoft was unable to produce enough units to satisfy demand during 2021, the revenue from consoles increased because the consoles had higher prices.

=== Series S performance problems ===
Microsoft has urged the development of games on both the Series X and Series S with feature-to-feature parity, despite the latter's limitations. In March 2021, Remedy, the developer of the game Control, said that the system with the lowest specs (the Xbox Series S) dictates the features used because games have to be able to run on the hardware and that optimization is nowhere near as simple as lowering resolution and texture quality. Spencer said that split-screen co-op is one feature that certain games, such as Forza, cannot use as the Series S, and thus has limited their own first-party releases. Spencer said in January 2025 that the requirement to support the Series S is not likely to be removed, as by targeting the Series S, games likely can also be ported to other lower power systems such as the Steam Deck or ROG Ally.

Larian Studios, the developers of Baldur's Gate 3, did not officially announce an Xbox Series X/S version due to technical issues relating to split-screen co-op on the Xbox Series S. This led to a rumor that the game was a PlayStation console exclusive. Larian Studios denied the console exclusivity and said that Baldur's Gate 3 might get released on Xbox should the problems get fixed. Larian discussed the matter with Spencer, and in August 2023, the studio said it would release Baldur's Gate 3 for the Xbox Series X and Series S without the split-screen co-op feature. By January 2025, Larian released a patch that enabled split-screen for Series S users.
