= Tamilaga Vettri Kazhagam =

Indian political party

- Abbreviation: TVK
- President: C. Joseph Vijay
- General Secretary: N. Anand
- Treasurer: P. Venkataramanan
- Founder: C. Joseph Vijay
- Founded: 2 February 2024; 2 years ago
- Headquarters: Panaiyur, Chennai
- Membership: 15 million+ (September 2025)
- Ideology: Egalitarianism; Secularism; Social justice; Populism
- Political position: Centre-left
- Colours: Dark Red; Yellow
- Slogan: Pirappokkum Ella Uyirkkum (transl. All are equal by birth) (from Kural verse 972)
- ECI status: State Party
- Alliance: SSJVA (2026–Present) INDIA (2026-Present)
- Seats in Rajya Sabha: 0 / 245
- Seats in Lok Sabha: 0 / 543
- Seats in Tamil Nadu Legislative Assembly: 108 / 234
- Seats in Puducherry Legislative Assembly: 2 / 30
- Number of states and union territories in government: 1 / 31

Election symbol
- Whistle

Party flag
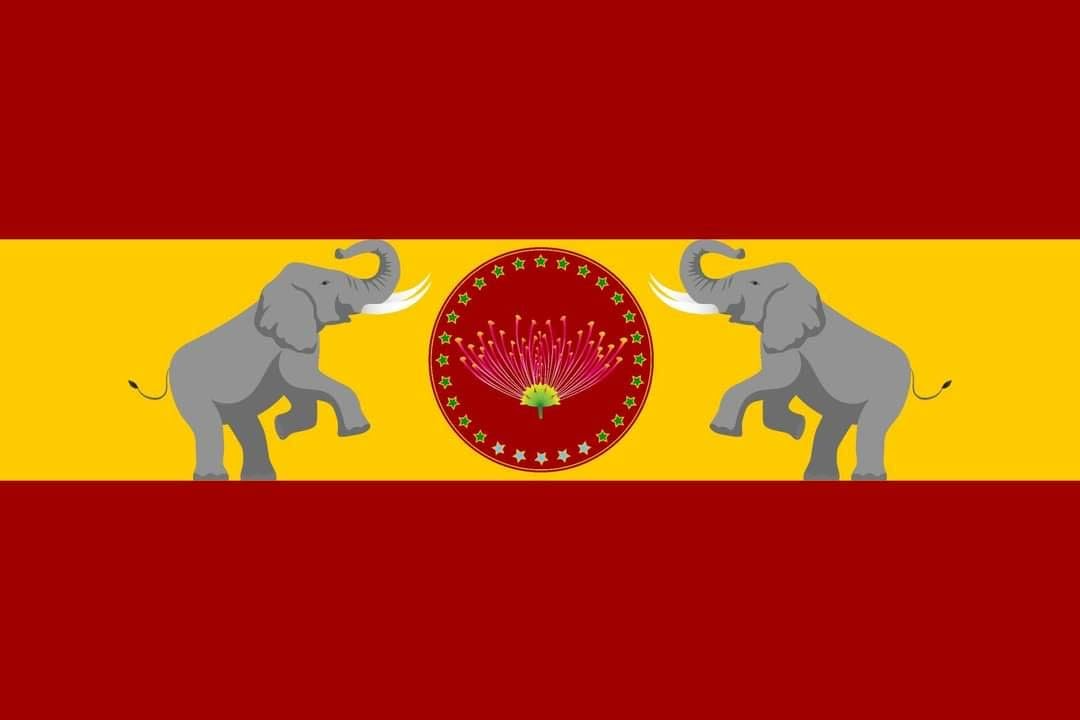

Website
- tvkvijay.com

Tamilaga Vettri Kazhagam (transl. Victory Party of Tamilakam; abbr. TVK) is an Indian regional political party active in the state of Tamil Nadu and the union territory of Puducherry. It was founded on 2 February 2024 by actor-turned-politician C. Joseph Vijay, the party's president, and is headquartered at Panaiyur, Chennai. Its ideological principles are rooted in egalitarianism, secularism, and social justice. TVK assumed power in Tamil Nadu in the 2026 Legislative Assembly election, with Vijay as Chief Minister, and has two seats in the 16th Puducherry Assembly. It is part of the Indian National Developmental Inclusive Alliance, a pan-Indian bloc led by the opposition Indian National Congress (INC).

== History ==
=== Origin and formation ===
In July 2009, actor C. Joseph Vijay organised his fan clubs—reportedly numbering around 85,000 across Tamil Nadu, under the umbrella of a welfare association titled Vijay Makkal Iyakkam (transl. Vijay's People Movement). The association supported the AIADMK-led Alliance in the 2011 elections for the Tamil Nadu Legislative Assembly. After a period of non-involvement in politics, the organisation contested the local body elections in Tamil Nadu in 2021 and won 115 out of the 169 seats it contested.

Vijay made occasional political statements such as condemning the Citizenship (Amendment) Act in February 2019, and criticising the other political parties in an event in June 2023. On 2 February 2024, Vijay announced the launch of his political party, Tamilaga Vettri Kazhagam (TVK), and stated his intent to contest the 2026 Tamil Nadu assembly elections.

In July 2024, Vijay called for the abolishment of the National Eligibility cum Entrance Test, and demanded that the subject of education be moved from the Concurrent List back to the State List. In September 2024, TVK announced its ideological alignment with centre-left, following the ideologies of Ambedkar, Periyar, and Kamaraj. The party further rejected any association with right-wing politics.

=== Rallies and further events ===
On 27 October 2024, TVK held its first political conference in Vikravandi, which was reportedly attended by over 800,000 people. In the rally, Vijay unveiled the party's ideology as "secular social justice, and supporting social justice, secularism, egalitarianism, two-language policy, and democracy. During the conference, Vijay termed the Bharatiya Janata Party (BJP) as an "ideological opponent" due to its right-wing politics and the Dravida Munnetra Kazhagam (DMK) as a "political adversary" due to its alleged corruption and dynastic politics.

On 3 November 2024, the party passed 26 resolutions criticising the central and state governments. After the conference, TVK attracted reaching out to youth, which prompted traditional parties like the DMK and the All India Anna Dravida Munnetra Kazhagam (AIADMK) to increase their efforts to retain their voter base ahead of the 2026 elections.

On 13 February 2025, the party announced a large-scale enrollment drive with plans to appoint over 70,000 booth agents and restructure its internal hierarchy in preparation for the 2026 state elections. On 16 April 2025, the All India Muslim Jamaat President Maulana Shahabuddin Razvi Bareilvi reportedly issued a fatwa (a legal opinion in Islamic law) on TVK chief Vijay in relation to a recent iftar gathering hosted by his party and his anti-Islamic behavior, alleging that some of Vijay's film roles have depicted Muslims in a negative manner, including associating them with terrorism.

On 26 April 2025, the party held a meeting of the party functionaries in Coimbatore, where Vijay stated his commitment to establish a corruption-free, transparent, and accountable government.

On 21 August 2025, the party held its second conference in Madurai, where Vijay continued to attack the BJP and the DMK, while praising former actor-turned politicians M. G. Ramachandran and Vijayakanth. He also reiterated his promise for the safety of women, welfare of youth, elderly and trans persons, farmers, labourers, weavers, fisherfolk. He also called for the retrieval of the island of Katchatheevu from Sri Lanka.

On 27 September 2025, during a campaign rally hosted by Vijay in the outskirts of Karur, a crowd crush resulted in the deaths of at least 41 people and left 80 others injured. Vijay shared a statement on social media expressing his condolences and announced that he intended to pay the families of the deceased ₹2 million (US$21,000), and the injured ₹0.2 million (US$2,100). On 27 October 2025, Vijay met with victim's families in Mamallapuram to express his condolences. The incident led to multiple litigation, and subsequent Central Bureau of Investigation inquiry into the incident.

On 4 March 2026, supporters of TVK were reported to have created several fake social media accounts impersonating media outlets, as well as fictitious media organizations. These accounts allegedly disseminated false and defamatory remarks about journalists and media organizations. They also posted derogatory content targeting leaders and functionaries of various political parties in Tamil Nadu. The Chennai Press Club described the incident as an attempt to suppress freedom of expression and urged actor C. Joseph Vijay to take action against those responsible.

On 7 March 2026, the party held International Women's Day celebration at Mahabalipuram near Chennai. During the event, party leader Vijay unveiled the party's first set of promises, ahead of the 2026 Tamil Nadu assembly elections. The announcements were primarily women-centric, and included monthly financial assistance, free LPG cylinders, free bus travel in government buses, one sovereign of gold and silk sari for brides from poor families, gold ring and welcome kit for newborns, educational assistance for poor students, and dedicated safety teams for women's safety.

=== Assembly election ===
On 18 March 2026, Vijay stated that the party would contest alone in all the seats in the upcoming 2026 Tamil Nadu assembly elections. On 29 March 2026, the party announced the candidates for all the seats, and released the manifesto for the elections. Vijay started his campaign for the elections on 30 March 2026, after filing his nomination to contest the elections from the Perambur Assembly constituency. A case was subsequently registered against him by the election officer for violating the Model Code of Conduct during the campaign. In the assembly elections in Tamil Nadu, TVK emerged as the single largest party, winning 108 out of the 234 seats in the state assembly. On 10 September 2026, Election Commission of India recognised TVK as a state party in Tamil Nadu and confirmed the ‘whistle’ as its reserved election symbol.

On 17 October 2026, a TVK functionary, who was a member of the party’s Nagapattinam district executive committee and was and in-charge for the Kilvelur Assembly constituency during the 2026 Assembly election, was arrested by the Directorate of Revenue Intelligence (DRI) in connection with the seizure of 135 kg of methamphetamine, a synthetic drug reportedly worth several hundred crore rupees. He was reported to be the alleged mastermind behind the smuggling operation, in which the drugs were transported from Chennai to Nagapattinam and were reportedly intended to be sent to Sri Lanka by sea. TVK subsequently expelled the functionary from the party.

== Electoral performance ==
=== State legislative assembly elections ===
Tamil Nadu Legislative Assembly Elections
Year	Assembly	Party leader	Seats contested	Seats won	Change in seats	Percentage of votes	Vote swing	Popular vote	Outcome
2026	17th	C. Joseph Vijay	233	108 / 234	▲108	34.92%	Steady	17,226,209	Minority Government

Puducherry Legislative Assembly Elections
Year	Assembly	Party leader	Seats contested	Seats won	Change in seats	Percentage of votes	Vote swing	Popular vote	Outcome
2026	16th	C. Joseph Vijay	28	2 / 30	▲2	16.72%	Steady	144,814	Others

== Current office bearers ==
Member	Current elected positions	Party position
C. Joseph Vijay	Chief Minister of Tamil Nadu; Member of the Tamil Nadu Legislative Assembly (Perambur)	President
N. Anand	Cabinet minister in the Government of Tamil Nadu; Member of the Tamil Nadu Legislative Assembly (Thiyagarayanagar)	General secretary
C. T. R. Nirmal Kumar	Member of the Tamil Nadu Legislative Assembly (Thirupparankundram)	Deputy general secretary
P. Venkataramanan	Cabinet minister in the Government of Tamil Nadu; Member of the Tamil Nadu Legislative Assembly (Mylapore)	Treasurer
Jhon Arokiasamy	Advisor on Political Affairs to the Chief Minister's office	Election strategist
Aadhav Arjuna	Cabinet minister in the Government of Tamil Nadu; Member of the Tamil Nadu Legislative Assembly (Villivakkam)	Campaign management general secretary
K. G. Arunraj	Cabinet minister in the Government of Tamil Nadu; Member of the Tamil Nadu Legislative Assembly (Tiruchengode)	Propaganda & policy general secretary.
K. A. Sengottaiyan	Cabinet minister in the Government of Tamil Nadu; Member of the Tamil Nadu Legislative Assembly	Chief coordinator of the high-level administrative committee
Rajasekar		Headquarters secretary
Rajmohan Arumugam	Cabinet minister in the Government of Tamil Nadu; Member of the Tamil Nadu Legislative Assembly (Egmore)	Propaganda secretary
Nanjil Sampath	–	Campaign secretary
C. Vijayalakshmi		Membership secretary
I. Thahira	–	Joint secretary

== List of party leaders ==
=== President ===
No.	Portrait	Name (Birth–Death)	Term in office		
No.	Portrait	Name (Birth–Death)	Assumed office	Left office	Time in office
1		C. Joseph Vijay (b. 1974)	2 February 2024	Incumbent	2 years, 290 days

=== General Secretary ===
No.	Portrait	Name (Birth–Death)	Term in office		
No.	Portrait	Name (Birth–Death)	Assumed office	Left office	Time in office
1		N. Anand (b. 1964)	2 February 2024	Incumbent	2 years, 290 days

== Media ==
Vettri is a Tamil-language digital news platform associated with TVK. It was reported in June 2026 that the platform was preparing to launch as a news channel and was described as a proposed mouthpiece of the party.

In September 2026, Vettri announced a Malayalam-language digital channel named Vijayam. The Malayalam service is reported to be part of Vettri Digital's planned multilingual expansion.

== See also ==
- Politics of Tamil Nadu
