= Shujaat Ali Quadri =

Indian student activist and journalist

Dr. Shujaat Ali Quadri
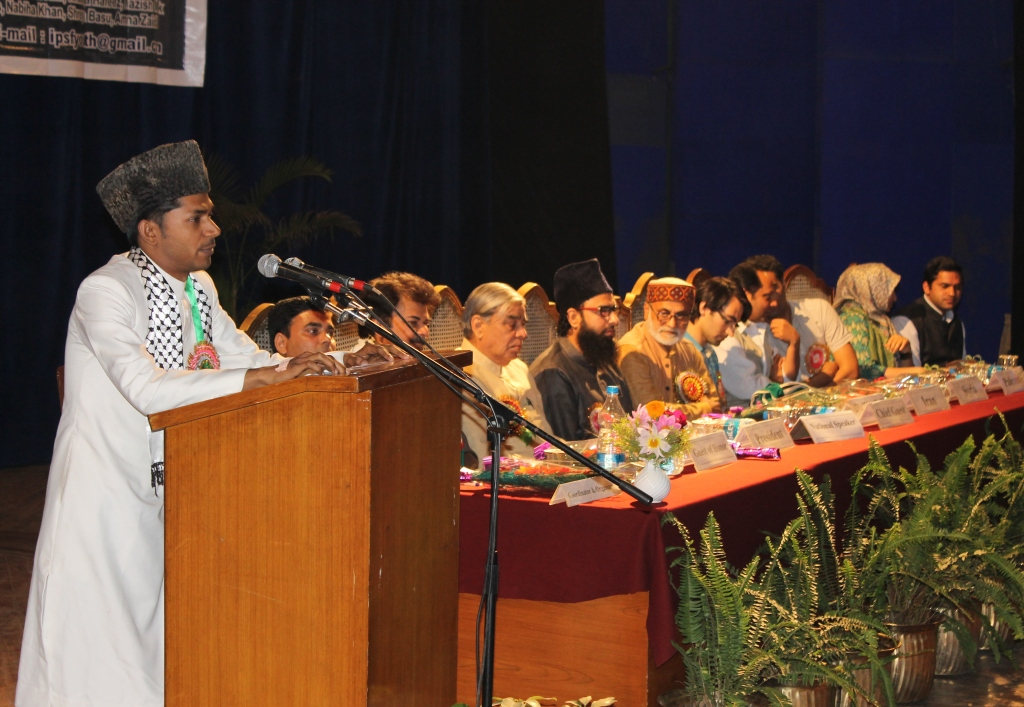

Co-founder of Digital Forensics, Research and Analytics Center
- Incumbent
- Assumed office 2021

Chairman of The Muslim Students' Organization of India
- Incumbent
- Assumed office 2021

Spokesperson of All India Tanzeem Ulama-e-Islam
- Incumbent
- Assumed office 2016

National President of the Muslim Students' Organization of India
- In office 2017–2021
- Preceded by: Syed Muhammad Quadri
- Succeeded by: Muhammad Mudassir Ashrafi

Personal details
- Born: Shujaat Ali Quadri; 1 September 1989 (age 37) Bahraich, Uttar Pradesh
- Spouse: Shireen
- Parent(s): Haji Shabbir Ali Quadri (father); Shabana (mother)
- Education: Aligarh Muslim University
- Occupation: Student activism; Journalist

Shujaat Ali Quadri (born 1 September 1989) is an Indian student activist and journalist. Qadri is serving as Chairman of Muslim Students' Organization of India since 2021, earlier he had served as National President of Muslim Students' Organization of India from 2017 to 2021. He is co-founder of Digital Forensics, Research and Analytics Center. He is a Deputy Director of Indo Islamic Heritage Center.

== Personal life ==
Shujaat Ali Quadri was born on 1 September 1989 to Haji Shabbir Ali Quadri and Shabana in Bahraich, Uttar Pradesh.

Quadri is married to Shireen.

== Career ==
Shujaat Ali Quadri is regular columnist in The Print, The Siasat Daily, Asian News International, Deccan Herald, and Latestly.

He is an author on The Print, Greater Kashmir, Rashtriya Sahara, Asian News International and on Thereports.in.

== Opinion and activism ==
Dr. Quadri is active in national and international issues. he has organized anti terror conferences in India to de-radicalize youths.

As an activist, he is also associated with Palestine solidarity Forum and has organised several peace marches and conference to discuss the rights of Palestinians. Recently banned, Popular Front of India, According to Qadri, has done more damages than good to Indian Muslims.

Talking to Times of India in 2016, he explained his plan to organize Sufi Conference which will educate Kashmiri youths about real Islam, Sufism.

He has praised Government of India in its efforts to reach out Minorities. According to him, several welfare schemes run by the Minority Affairs Ministry have changed the lives of minorities in the country for the better.
