= FTC v. Microsoft =

American court case

- Court: United States Court of Appeals for the Ninth Circuit
- Full case name: Federal Trade Commission v. Microsoft Corp. and Activision Blizzard, Inc.
- Argued: December 6, 2023

Court membership
- Judges sitting: Daniel P. Collins, Danielle J. Forrest, Jennifer Sung

Federal Trade Commission v. Microsoft Corp. and Activision Blizzard, Inc. was a lawsuit brought against multinational technology corporation Microsoft and video game holding company Activision Blizzard in 2022. The Federal Trade Commission (FTC) sought a temporary injunction against Microsoft in its effort to acquire Activision Blizzard.

In January 2022, Microsoft announced its intention to acquire Activision Blizzard. The deal would make Microsoft the third-largest gaming company by revenue, raising antitrust concerns. The FTC began reviewing the deal later that month and voted to file a legal challenge to stop Microsoft from acquiring the company in December 2022. A temporary restraining order and preliminary injunction were requested before judge Jacqueline Scott Corley in June 2023. Corley rejected the preliminary injunction on July 11, and the FTC appealed the ruling a day later to the Court of Appeals for the Ninth Circuit. The Ninth Circuit denied granting the FTC a preliminary injunction in May 2025, shortly followed by the FTC dropping the case that same month.

The injunction presented a threat to the acquisition and would have halted it if granted in higher courts. FTC v. Microsoft is regarded as Microsoft's largest legal challenge since United States v. Microsoft Corp. (2001).

== Background ==
On January 18, 2022, Microsoft announced its intention to acquire Activision Blizzard for US$68.7 billion, following the company's acquisition of ZeniMax Media for US$7.5 billion in March 2021 and amid a workplace misconduct lawsuit filed against the company by the California Department of Fair Employment and Housing. According to Securities and Exchange Commission (SEC) filings, Xbox head Phil Spencer discussed acquiring Activision Blizzard days after The Wall Street Journal released its report on Activision Blizzard CEO Bobby Kotick's behavior at the company. The deal, which would add many of Activision Blizzard's franchises to Microsoft's subscription service Xbox Game Pass, would make Microsoft the third-largest gaming company by revenue behind Chinese multinational technology company Tencent and Japanese multinational conglomerate Sony. Call of Duty, an Activision Blizzard franchise, would remain on Sony's PlayStation platform for at least three more games, according to Bloomberg News's Jason Schreier; at the time, the games remaining on PlayStation included Call of Duty: Modern Warfare II (2022), Call of Duty: Warzone 2.0 (2022), and Treyarch's forthcoming Call of Duty game in the main series. Following Schreier's report, Microsoft assured customers that it will keep Activision Blizzard's titles on PlayStation beyond Activision Blizzard's existing agreement with PlayStation, despite making ZeniMax Media's Redfall and Starfield (2023) exclusive to Windows and Xbox.

Microsoft's intent to acquire Activision Blizzard raised potential antitrust concerns both within the United States and abroad. The Federal Trade Commission (FTC) said it would review the deal on January 31; although acquisitions are usually reviewed by the Department of Justice, the FTC has begun a push into regulating Big Tech. Senators Elizabeth Warren, Bernie Sanders, Sheldon Whitehouse, and Cory Booker—noted opponents of Big Tech—urged FTC chairwoman Lina Khan to investigate the acquisition. In September 2022, the United Kingdom's Competition and Markets Authority signaled it would investigate Microsoft if the company could not answer its concerns. In a blog post, Spencer cited Microsoft's acquisition of Mojang Studios, the developers of Minecraft (2011), for US$2.5 billion in 2014 as a testament to the company's approach to releasing games on multiple platforms. The European Commission began a provision review later that month and opened an "in-depth investigation" in November.

On October 13, 2023, after receiving approval from most international regulatory bodies, Microsoft closed the deal to acquire Activision Blizzard. Despite the closure the FTC has continued their litigation, and if successful could require concessions or a settlement from Microsoft.

== Lawsuit ==
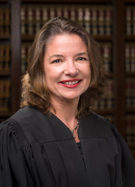
Judge Jacqueline Scott Corley oversaw FTC v. Microsoft.

On December 8, 2022, the FTC voted to file a legal challenge to block Microsoft's acquisition of Activision Blizzard. In the lawsuit, the FTC alleges that Microsoft would use its Xbox gaming consoles, Xbox Game Pass, and Xbox Cloud Gaming to suppress competitors, a view point shared by FTC Bureau of Competition director Holly Vedova. Microsoft president and vice chairman Brad Smith asserted that the company has "complete confidence" in its case and welcomes the "opportunity to present it in court". Vice president of communications Frank X. Shaw tweeted a link to a document entitled, "Get The Facts: How Microsoft is Committed to Growing Gaming Communities". Microsoft responded to the challenge with a filing that claimed that the FTC was unconstitutional, salvo that was later removed. The FTC followed their challenge up with a request for a temporary restraining order and preliminary injunction before judge Jacqueline Scott Corley on June 12, 2023, amid concerns that Microsoft may close the deal regardless with approval from the European Commission on July 18. The injunction prevents Microsoft from completing its acquisition of Activision Blizzard until the result of the FTC's legal challenge; an evidentiary hearing for that case was set for August 2.

On July 18, twenty-two Republicans in the House of Representatives sent a letter urging the FTC to drop the case. Two days later, the FTC withdrew its lawsuit. The FTC announced it was resuming the case in September 2023. Arguments before the Ninth Circuit Court began on December 6, 2023, before judges Daniel P. Collins, Danielle J. Forrest, and Jennifer Sung.

== Injunction case ==
=== Preliminary hearing ===
Microsoft's exhibit list for the injunction case included several documents, including emails between Spencer and Sony Interactive Entertainment president Jim Ryan, Xbox Game Studios head Matt Booty discussing Xbox games for the Nintendo Switch, and Xbox leadership discussing "pettiness from Sony and Gamespots [sic] fanboy reviewers". In his deposition, Ryan stated that Sony would not share details about its forthcoming video game console with a Microsoft-owned Activision Blizzard. The injunction case began on June 23, 2023. On the first day, the FTC questioned Xbox's ability to port the Call of Duty franchise onto the Nintendo Switch, arguing that technical limitations would make the series' games separate. In a 2021 email, Booty objected to Nvidia putting Xbox Game Studios games onto its GeForce Now streaming service with Microsoft's permission. Upon acquiring Bethesda Softworks, he recommended pulling Bethesda's games from GeForce Now; earlier in June, Microsoft signed a deal with Nvidia to bring Xbox games onto the service. Bethesda head of global publishing Pete Hines was questioned for an interview with GameSpot in which he was "bothered" by Starfield's exclusivity. Hines revealed that an upcoming Indiana Jones game from MachineGames would be exclusive to Windows and Xbox, altering a contract with Disney.

On the second day, Spencer emphasized that Xbox has lost the console war to Sony and Nintendo. The FTC focused on Xbox exclusives; Spencer refused to confirm whether or not The Elder Scrolls VI would be available on PlayStation but revealed that Microsoft acquired Bethesda after learning that Starfield would be a PlayStation exclusive. It was also revealed that Microsoft considered making Minecraft Dungeons (2021) an exclusive but ultimately decided against it. Under oath, Spencer testified that Call of Duty will remain on PlayStation for the next ten years and asked him about the Diablo franchise. Former Google Stadia product lead Dov Zimring appeared. The third day marked a series of video depositions livestreamed through Zoom. Ryan contended that Nintendo operates in a different market and that Bethesda's games were multiplatform before the company was acquired. An email shared by PlayStation includes a list of Activision Blizzard games that would remain on PlayStation. The list mentions Overwatch (2016) but not Overwatch 2 (2022), the former of which no longer exists in place of the latter. Robin Lee, a professor of economics at Harvard University, stated that Xbox's market share would increase nearly ten percentage points if Call of Duty was an Xbox exclusive; Elizabeth Bailey argued that Call of Duty is "not a unicorn". Microsoft CEO Satya Nadella said he has "no love" for exclusives and Kotick stated that exclusives are "very detrimental" for business. Collectively, Nadella, Kotick, and Spencer argued that exclusives such as Final Fantasy XVI (2023) force Xbox into making exclusives.

During the injunction case, both Sony and Microsoft revealed highly confidential information. One email seen by The Verge shows that Xbox was willing to acquire Bungie (Note: Microsoft owned Bungie from 2000 until 2007.)—now owned by Sony—and Sega to bolster Xbox Game Pass. Hitman developer IO Interactive was also on Microsoft's "final watchlist" for companies to acquire in 2021. IO Interactive's upcoming fantasy game will be an Xbox exclusive. Microsoft lawyer Beth Wilkinson revealed that The Elder Scrolls VI has a projected release date of 2026. An unredacted document showed that Microsoft Azure made less than half of the revenue than its rival, Amazon Web Services, in 2022. Documents submitted by Sony appeared to have been redacted using a black Sharpie but, upon being scanned in, the redacted figures were legible, revealing development cost figures. In contending that Call of Duty did not have an impact on the company's revenue, Sony revealed that approximately one million players exclusively play Call of Duty on PlayStation; the series as a whole is valued at US$15.9 billion, according to one document. Similarly, an FTC lawyer accidentally revealed Xbox's revenue split and the FTC's counsel stated that Microsoft was working on a dedicated version of Xbox Cloud Gaming to undermine the argument that it was intended to be a feature. Microsoft uploaded hundreds of internal documents to the District Court for the Northern District of California's website. The documents include an email stating The Elder Scrolls VI would release in 2026 exclusively on Windows and Xbox.

=== Ruling and appeal ===
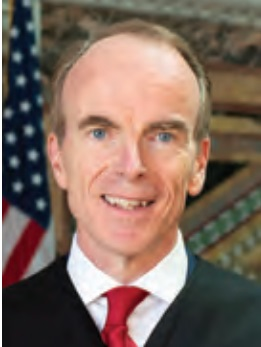
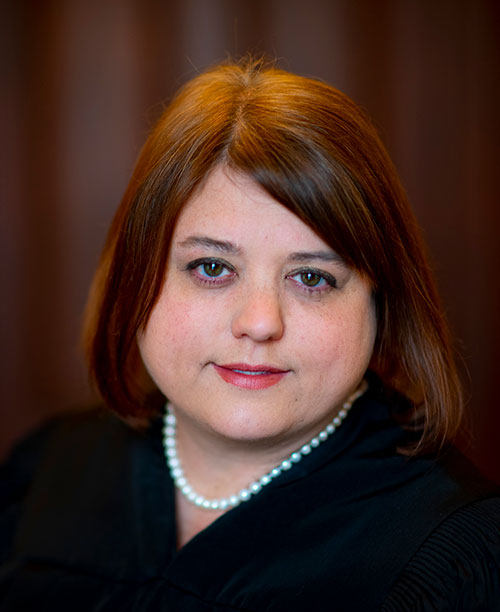
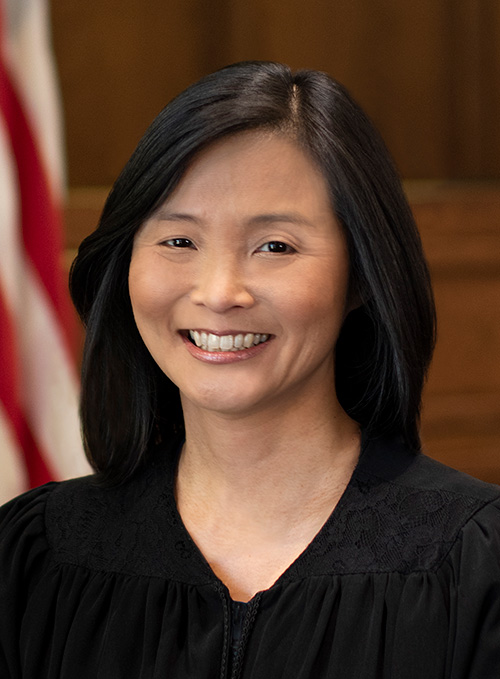
Judges Daniel P. Collins, Danielle J. Forrest, and Jennifer Sung are overseeing FTC v. Microsoft.

On July 11, 2023, Corley ruled against FTC and denied the motion for a preliminary injunction, arguing that Microsoft had made a commitment to keeping Call of Duty on PlayStation. A spokesman for the FTC stated that they were disappointed by the ruling and would announce their next steps in the coming days. Smith called the decision "quick and thorough". The FTC was given the opportunity to appeal the ruling until July 14; the agency appealed it a day later. The FTC also filed a separate motion to Corley on July 13 arguing for another injunction until the Ninth Circuit had time to decide to stay Corley's previous ruling, but she denied that motion. The Ninth Circuit denied the emergency appeal to block the merger on July 14. The FTC appealed the decision to the Court of Appeals for the Ninth Circuit. Over three dozen venture capital firms and investors openly opposed the appeal in a letter.

The FTC filed a complaint about layoffs in Microsoft Gaming on February 7, 2024, and intended pricing changes to Xbox Game Pass on July 18.

The Ninth Circuit ruled on May 7, 2025, to deny the FTC's request for an injunction. With the denial, the FTC dropped the case on May 22, 2025.

== Reactions ==
In The Hill, conservative journalist Stephen Kent criticized Federal Trade Commission chair Lina Khan and praised Microsoft. The Washington Post's editorial board said that the FTC should allow the deal to proceed, but include a consent decree that permits the agency to make any Activision Blizzard titles multiplatform under their discretion. The New York Times viewed the case as Microsoft's "biggest challenge in Washington in two decades", referring to United States v. Microsoft Corp. (2001), and noted Khan's efforts to regulate Big Tech. The injunction ruling presented a failure for Khan and emboldened critics.

== See also ==
- Big Tech
