= Jacqueline Scott Corley =

American judge (born 1966)

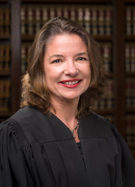

Judge of the United States District Court for the Northern District of California
- Incumbent
- Assumed office March 30, 2022
- Appointed by: Joe Biden
- Preceded by: William Alsup

Magistrate Judge of the United States District Court for the Northern District of California
- In office May 18, 2011 – March 30, 2022
- Preceded by: Edward M. Chen

Personal details
- Born: Jacqueline Marie Scott; 1966 (age 59–60) Long Beach, California, U.S.
- Education: University of California, Berkeley (BA); Harvard University (JD)

Jacqueline Scott Corley (née Jacqueline Marie Scott, born 1966) is a United States district judge of the United States District Court for the Northern District of California. She served as a United States Magistrate Judge of the same court from 2011 to 2022.

== Education ==
Corley graduated from the University of California, Berkeley, with an undergraduate degree in 1988, and, in 1991, graduated with her Juris Doctor degree magna cum laude from Harvard Law School, where she was also an editor and articles chair on the Harvard Law Review.

== Career ==
Upon graduation from law school, Corley served as a law clerk for Judge Robert Keeton of the United States District Court for the District of Massachusetts from 1991 to 1992.

She then practiced with the law firm of Goodwin Procter in Boston, focusing on white collar criminal defense as well as complex commercial civil litigation from 1992 to 1994. Corley then worked as a litigation associate at the firm of Coblentz, Patch, Duffy & Bass LLP in San Francisco from 1994 to 1997.

From 1998 to 2009, Corley served as the permanent law clerk to Judge Charles Breyer of the United States District Court for the Northern District of California. She also served on the Northern District of California Alternative Dispute Resolution mediation and early neutral evaluation panels from 2006 to 2007 though her appointment in 2011.

From 2009 to 2011, Corley was a partner at the law firm of Kerr & Wagstaffe in San Francisco, where she had a focus on federal practice as a civil litigator. At Kerr & Wagstaffe, Corley represented government entities, individuals and institutions as plaintiffs and defendants in various cases involving patent, copyright law, trademark, defamation, constitutional law, malicious prosecution, class action, contract, and probate legal issues.

=== Federal judicial service ===
On May 18, 2011, Corley was appointed as a United States Magistrate Judge of the Northern District of California. She took her seat vacated by Judge Edward M. Chen, who was elevated as a district court judge in 2011. Corley also served as the Northern District of California's Alternative Dispute Resolution (ADR) Magistrate Judge, in charge of coordinating the ADR program with the Court during her time as a magistrate judge. Her service as a magistrate judge was terminated on March 30, 2022, when she was elevated as a district judge.

On November 3, 2021, President Joe Biden nominated Corley to serve as a United States district judge of the United States District Court for the Northern District of California. President Biden nominated Corley to the seat vacated by Judge William Alsup, who assumed senior status on January 21, 2021. On December 1, 2021, a hearing on her nomination was held before the Senate Judiciary Committee. On January 3, 2022, her nomination was returned to the President under Rule XXXI, Paragraph 6 of the United States Senate; she was later renominated the same day. On January 13, 2022, her nomination was reported out of committee by a 16–6 vote. On March 16, 2022, the Senate invoked cloture on her nomination by a 63–35 vote. On March 17, 2022, her nomination was confirmed by a 63–36 vote. She received her judicial commission on March 30, 2022.

==== Notable cases ====
In 2023, Corley oversaw the lawsuit brought by the Federal Trade Commission (FTC) to block the acquisition of Activision Blizzard by Microsoft. In June 2023, Corley disclosed that her son was working for Microsoft at the time of the trial, which led judicial watchdog group the Revolving Door Project to issue an open letter to Corley arguing that her son's employment at Microsoft could create the "appearance of improper incentives" and might violate the federal Code of Conduct for US judges. In July 2023, Corley ruled that the FTC hadn't proven that the deal would harm consumers. On May 7, 2025, the Ninth Circuit upheld the judge's decision that the FTC had failed to demonstrate that the agreement substantially reduced competition in the various markets. Two weeks later, the FTC dismissed the case, concluding that it was no longer in the public interest.

Legal offices
Preceded by William Alsup	Judge of the United States District Court for the Northern District of California; 2022–present	Incumbent
