= All India Tanzeem Ulama-e-Islam =

Islam organisation in India

All India Tanzeem Ulamae Islam
- Abbreviation: AITUI
- Founder: Mufti Ashfaq Hussain Qadri
- Type: Islamic religious organisation
- Headquarters: New Delhi, Shastri Park
- Location: Dargah Aala Hazrat, Bareilly, Uttar Pradesh
- Region served: India
- General Secretary: Maulana Shahabuddin Razvi
- Chairman: Mufti Ashfaq Hussain
- Spokesperson: Shujaat Ali Quadri

All India Tanzeem Ulama-e-Islam (AITUI), also known as Tanzeem Ulama-e-Islam, is an organisation of Barelvi Sunni Muslims in India. In 2019, an article in the Times of India via the Times News Network feed claimed AITUI was the predominant Sunni organization in the country.

== Activities ==
Maulana Shahabuddin Razvi General secretary of Tanzeem passed a fatwa boycotting Chinese products. On the occasion of 103 Urse Razvi, while issuing the "Muslim Agenda" in the press conference, has instructed Muslims to pay attention to education, business, and family and stop the evils spreading in the society, otherwise there will be big losses in the future. Shahbuddin said in a statement issued to the press that if Shahrukh Khan had taught his son Aryan in a madrasa, he would not have seen this day.

== History ==
AITUI was established by Maulana Ashfaq Hussain Qadri in Delhi. The general secretary is Maulana Sahabuddin Razvi.

== Events ==
=== Conference against terrorism 2016 ===
At a conference in the Talkatora Stadium, New Delhi culminated in the issuing of a fatwa against terrorism, with concerns expressed over activities of Wahabis

=== International Ghareeb Nawaz World Peace Conference 2019 ===
A key conference organised by AITUI was the International Ghareeb Nawaz World Peace Conference on 24 February 2019 at the Ramlila Maidan ground in New Delhi. According to the Spokesperson of AITUI, Shujaat Ali Quadri, a fatwa was issued against the terrorism by the prominent mufti and ulema during the event.

== See also ==
- All India Ulema and Mashaikh Board, (AIUMB)
