= Watchdog journalism =

Journalism that plays an oversight role towards government, industry and society

Watchdog journalism is a form of investigative journalism in which journalists, authors or publishers of a news publication fact-check and interview political and public figures to increase accountability in democratic governance systems.

== Role ==
Watchdog journalists gather information about the actions of people in power and inform the public in order to hold elected officials to account. This requires maintaining a certain professional distance from people in power. Watchdog journalists are different from propagandist journalists in that they report from an independent, nongovernmental perspective. Due to watchdog journalism's unique features, it also often works as the fourth estate. The general issues, topics, or scandals that watchdog journalists cover are political corruption and any wrongdoing of people in power such as government officials or corporation executives.

=== Three dimensions of operationalization ===
The role of the press to be a "watchdog" and monitor a government's actions has been one of the fundamental components of a democratic society. Ettema and Glasser (1998) argue that watchdog journalism's most important role is that their "stories implicitly demand the response of public officials". Playing a role as a Fourth Estate, watchdog journalism is able to force governments to meet their obligations to the public by publicizing issues such as scandals, corruption, and failure to address needs of the public. Mellado (2015) identified and developed three dimensions of operationalization of the watchdog role: the intensity of scrutiny, journalistic voice, and the source of news event.

- Intensity of scrutiny: Watchdog journalism has a few levels of scrutiny in terms of its reporting style. First of all, at the lowest level, questions and interrogations are a key way to investigate people with power. At a next level, denunciation is still not necessarily needed. But it consists of more obvious and somewhat aggressive questions and interrogations. Lastly, the highest level of scrutiny involves the strategy which is designed for people who are investigated to confess their wrongdoing, which requires a variety of evidence of wrongdoing to be used.
- Journalistic voice: Watchdog journalism needs a few types of voices which are required to address the scrutiny. Specifically, journalists' own voice or a third party's voice is the most general type. In the case of a detached orientation of watchdog journalism, it is likely to use a third party's voice to question, criticize, and denounce wrongdoings what people with power do rather than using journalists' voices.
- Source of news event: There is a specific type of event that watchdog journalism is interested in to question, criticize, and denounce. Specifically, not only corruptions of the relationship between people with power and media, but also issues about judiciary processes or external investigations are likely to be handled by a detached orientation of watchdog journalism.

=== Predictors of watchdog role performance ===
Depending on the differences in a social and organizational level, a performance of the journalistic role also changes. In turn, there are a few factors that are likely to have an influence over the type of watchdog performance in the journalism.

- Democracy: Watchdog journalism can work effectively in well-established democratic countries, owing to the high level of the freedom of the press, journalistic autonomy and independence. A low level of press censorship, state intervention, and institutional control are ensured at the same time.
- Audience orientation: Audience orientation is one of the factors that affects the performance of journalistic roles. For instance, in China, market newspapers are more likely to play a role as the watchdog journalism than an official newspaper, which is supposed to publicize corruptions of people with power such as how they misuse existing policy or law, does. At this point, there is a huge difference in reporting styles between popular press and elite press.
- Media political leaning: The political orientation of the journalism is closely associated to the performance of the watchdog role. To be specific, according to what Mellado et al. (2017) found in five Latin American countries, the media that serves the interests of the right or moderates is less likely to work as a watchdog than the media serving interests of the left. In addition, biased tendency of the media has a great impact on the coverage of the political issues or scandals.
- News beats: The performance of the watchdog journalism is influenced by journalistic specialization. For instance, based on what Reich (2012) found, journalists who deal with political issues are highly likely to act as watchdogs than ones who cover business issues. Similar tendency appears in other countries including China, Chile, and Spain. To be specific, in these countries, watchdog journalism can be found in the field that covers the political scandals, while business and economy journalists are less likely to act as watchdog.

=== Detached watchdog ===
Detached watchdog journalism, one of the four identified journalism cultures, puts emphasis on neutrality, fairness, objectivity, and impartiality. This is the most familiar and pervasive type of a few forms of watchdog journalism. Detached watchdog refers to observing issues in a detached manner. So it pursues a different approach in scrutinizing wrongdoings and publicizing them to the public from what interventionist approach does. In addition this is the reason why characteristics including neutrality, fairness, objectivity, and impartiality are important. But it does not mean that watchdog journalists do not take a skeptical and critical action. The detached watchdog journalism is predominant especially in the western countries such as Germany, the United States, Austria, and Switzerland.

In the detached approach, the most predominant form of watchdog journalism, criticism and question which are done by sources are the least intense levels of scrutiny. Since the detached watchdog journalism generally consists of third parties (or sources) that question, criticize, and denounce wrongdoings, it tends to play a passive role in terms of investigating people in power. In this regard, one of the characteristics that distinguishes between detached and the other type of approaches named interventionist watchdog journalism is the type of event that journalists handle. The type of event that prompts the journalists to act as a watchdog to scrutinizing people in power by questioning and criticizing is different based on the approaches. Within liberal media systems, the phenomenon that journalists are highly likely to take the detached approach of the watchdog journalism can be often seen because of liberal media systems' a few unique features such as the factuality and objectivity.

=== Indicators of detached orientation and operationalization ===
- Questioning by sources: People other than journalists can question people in power by expressing opinions and giving statements or quotes.
- Criticism by sources: People other than journalists can criticize those with power can through expressing negative opinions or giving a statement or quote.
- Denunciation by sources: People other than journalists can provide a testimony or an evidence about something that people with power do and say.
- External investigation: Corruptions, scandals, or issues of people in power are often scrutinized and covered by the news media even though journalists do not handle them directly.
- Questioning by the journalist: Journalists can work as a watchdog by checking the legitimacy and integrity of people in power's action.
- Criticism by the journalist: The journalists are allowed to judge and condemn what people in power do by making assertions.
- Denunciation by the journalist: The journalists can denounce and accuse something that is hidden illegally by people in power by making assertions.
- Reporting of conflict: The journalists can bring a source, an institution, or people in power that have to be scrutinized to the table.

== In practice ==
The logo of the Washington Post

Historically, a lot of examples have proven that watchdog journalism has the power to dislodge corrupt people in power from their positions. One of the most famous examples is how coverage of the Watergate scandal, done by watchdog journalists Bob Woodward and Carl Bernstein, led to the resignation of the U.S. President Richard Nixon on August 9, 1974.

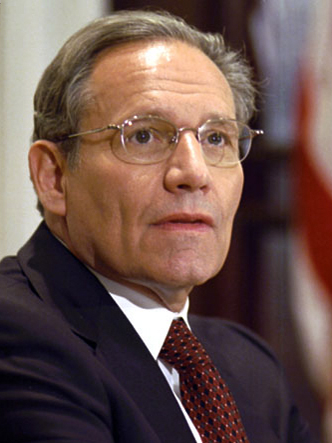
Bob Woodward, the investigative journalist of The Washington Post

=== Washington Post's coverage of Watergate scandal ===
The Watergate scandal was one of the biggest political scandals in the United States. It involved Richard Nixon, the 37th president of the United States and led him to resign.

This scandal stemmed from the exposure of a burglary of the Democratic National Committee headquarters in the Watergate Office Building, Washington D.C. committed by 5 former FBI and CIA agents, who were paid to plant a bug to help Nixon's re-election campaign. After the 5 were arrested, investigative journalists Bernstein and Woodward gradually exposed more details of the plot in a series of stories in The Washington Post. Eventually in 1973 the U.S. House of Representatives decide to commence an impeachment process against Nixon. Audio tapes that Nixon had secretly made of events in the Oval Office revealed that Nixon tried to cover up details of the crime. As a result, the impeachment against Richard Nixon was approved by the House judiciary committee. He resigned from the presidency on August 9, 1974.

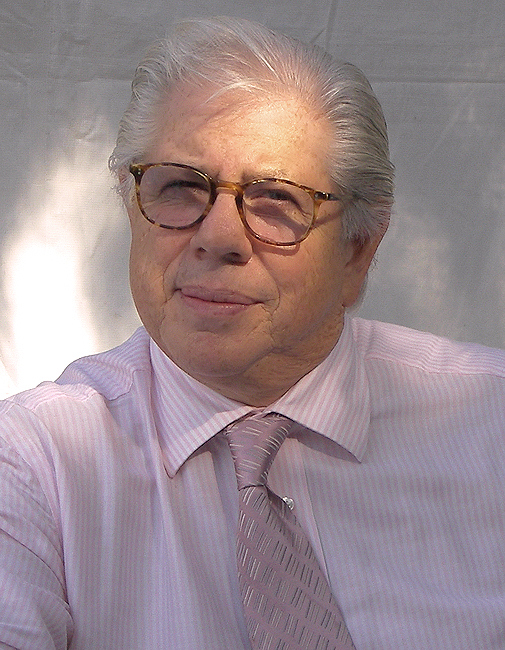
Carl Bernstein, the investigative journalist of The Washington Post

=== The role of Washington Post as watchdog journalism in the case of Watergate scandal ===
The case of Watergate scandal was a famous example showing the role of watchdog journalism, how it works, and its impact. The story was uncovered by in-depth journalists at the Washington Post, which found a concrete connection between the break in at the Watergate Office and Richard's Nixon's re-election committee. In order to cover the scandal, anonymous sources became the main material that The Washington Post relied on. However, Washington Post investigative journalists Bob Woodward and Carl Bernstein were significant contributors who uncovered information and evidence that proved the agents' break-in to plant a bug and attempts to conceal it, which then resulted in the intervention of the Justice Department, FBI, CIA, and the White House. Woodward and Bernstein also conducted interviews with witness Judy Hoback Miller, the bookkeep who worked at the Richard Nixon's re-election committee, to uncover evidence of conspiracy: Richard Nixon and his committee mishandling funds and destroying records. However, the most valuable and reliable source was an anonymous whistleblower nicknamed Deep Throat by Woodward and Bernstein. Every meeting between Washington Post investigative journalists and Deep Throat was held secretly. Through these meetings, Richard Nixon's, his committee's and the White House's involvement in the scandal were researched. It was later revealed that Deep Throat, the anonymous informant, was the 1970s FBI deputy director William Mark Felt, Sr.

=== Crisis in watchdog journalism ===
University of Illinois at Chicago circle logo

Journalism's role as a socio-political watchdog is threatened in many societies across the world. Due to watchdog journalism's ability to establish responsibility and handle corruption, particularly for those in power, it is often viewed as a dangerous and powerful tool. Since many local news media establishments and newspapers have faced closing or consolidation in recent years, watchdog journalism is in danger of extinction. In the United States, more than 1,400 cities in the last 15 years ago have seen independent local newspapers close, particularly cities where journalism that reported issues caused by corruption was needed. The phenomenon of disappearing watchdog journalism is observed to have negative outcomes for communities: for example, the dishonest actions of powerful societal figures like politicians are unable to be watched and criticized. Lack of transparency in these communities due to disappearing critical and independent journalism creates problems and stifles a healthy democracy.

University of Notre Dame seal

In addition, disappearing of a local newspaper that plays a role as a watchdog journalism is related to putting a financial problem directly on members in a community. Based on the research conducted by the University of Illinois at Chicago and the University of Notre Dame, it is found that increasing in borrowing costs after a local newspaper is closed has a close connection with municipal government. It indicates that the absence of a watchdog journalism leaves the public out of a discussion and helps people in power such as government officials to refuse to meet public scrutiny. People in power are highly likely to engage in wasteful spending because there is no journalism that watches and criticizes their actions, decisions, and policies. To simply put, if there is no investigative journalism, important issues that public must know are not covered. So instead of reporting on fraud, abuse, and waste, useless and meaningless topics will be handled as if they are the only problem that a community faces. For instance, a corruption scandal which is related to various public infrastructures such as hospital that require more resources with a high quality to provide better service to public will be less likely to be told.

An extreme example is provided by the City of Bell scandal: Bell, California is a modest income community of roughly 37,000 in Los Angeles County. In 1999 or shortly thereafter the local newspaper died. In 2010 the Los Angeles Times found that the city was near bankruptcy in spite of having atypically high property tax rates. Part-time city council members collected almost $100,000 a year. The Chief of Police's salary was over $450,000, roughly double that of the Los Angeles Chief of Police, whose department included almost 10,000 officers vs. 48 for Bell. The city manager made almost $800,000, almost double that of the President of the United States.

== Watchdog journal sites by country ==
These sites follow Watchdog Journalism:

- Albania
  - Balkan Insight
  - BIRN (birn.eu.com)
- Algeria
  - El Khabar
- Argentina
  - Global Investigative Journalism Network
  - Clarín Group
- Australia
  - Nick McKenzie
- Bangladesh
  - The Watchdog Post (thewatchdog-post.blogspot.com)
  - Rumor Scanner Bangladesh
  - Netra News
- India
  - DFRAC
  - Newslaundry
  - The Quint
- Pakistan
  - Soch Fact Check (sochfactcheck.com)

== See also ==
- Fake news
- Guardian Project (software)
- Journalistic interventionism
- Muckraking
- Whistleblowing
