= William Alsup =

American federal judge (born 1945)

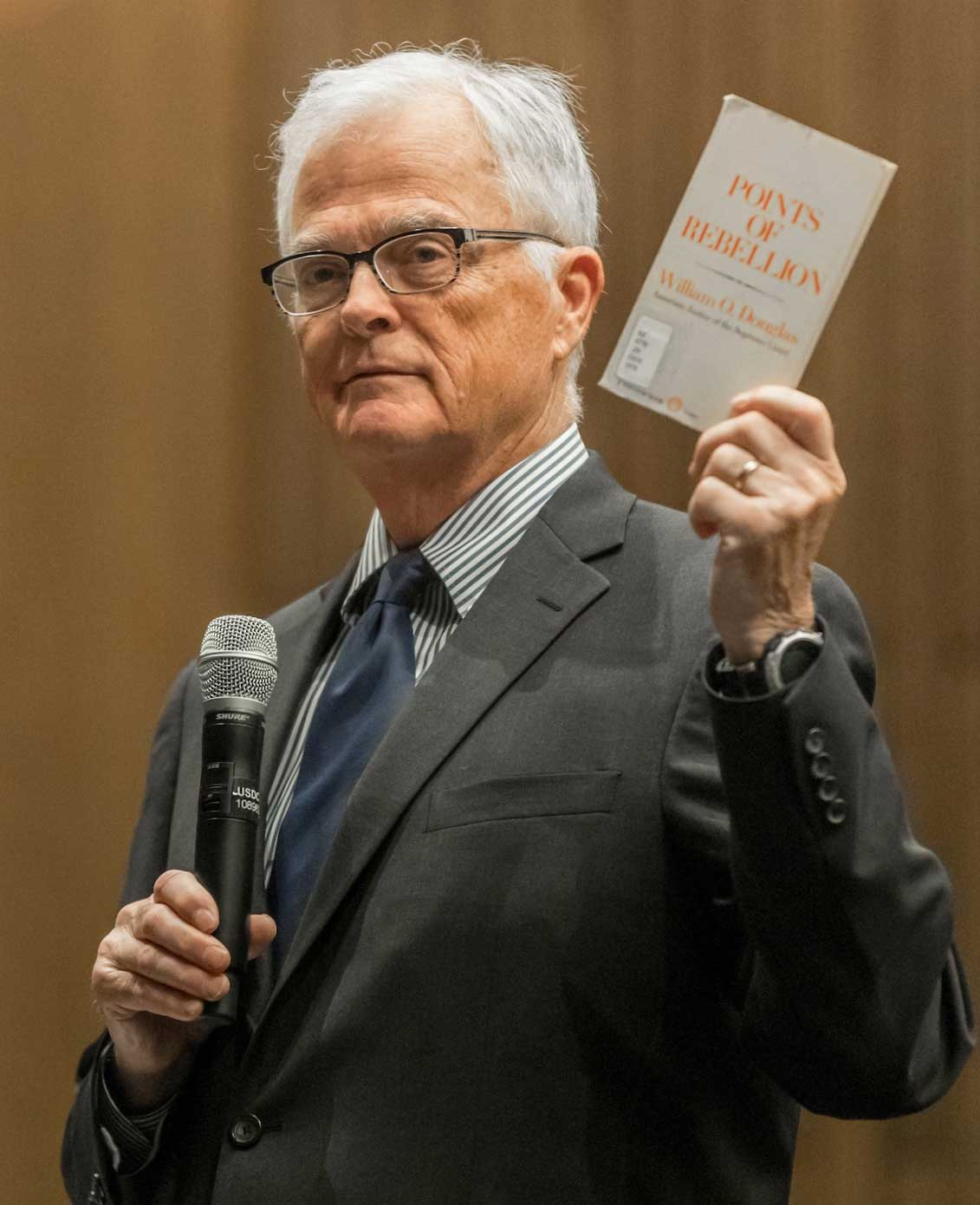

Senior Judge of the United States District Court for the Northern District of California
- Incumbent
- Assumed office January 21, 2021

Judge of the United States District Court for the Northern District of California
- In office August 17, 1999 – January 21, 2021
- Appointed by: Bill Clinton
- Preceded by: Thelton Henderson
- Succeeded by: Jacqueline Scott Corley

Personal details
- Born: William Haskell Alsup; June 27, 1945 (age 81) Jackson, Mississippi, U.S.
- Party: Democratic
- Education: Mississippi State University (BS); Harvard University (JD, MPP)

William Haskell Alsup (born June 27, 1945) is an American lawyer and jurist serving as senior United States district judge of the U.S. District Court for the Northern District of California. He was appointed to the Northern District of California in 1999 by President Bill Clinton and assumed senior status in 2021.

== Early life and career ==
Born in Jackson, Mississippi, Alsup received a Bachelor of Science degree in mathematics from Mississippi State University in 1967, a Juris Doctor from Harvard Law School in 1971, and a Master of Public Policy from Harvard University's John F. Kennedy School of Government in 1971.

He was a law clerk to Justice William O. Douglas of the Supreme Court of the United States from 1971 to 1972. Alsup was in private practice in San Francisco, California from 1972 to 1978 and an assistant to the United States Solicitor General in the United States Department of Justice from 1978 to 1980. He returned to private practice in San Francisco from 1980 to 1998 with Morrison & Foerster, when he briefly served as a special counsel in the Antitrust Division of the Department of Justice in 1998. He was again in private practice in San Francisco from 1998 to 1999.

== Federal judicial service ==
On March 24, 1999, President Bill Clinton nominated Alsup to a seat on the United States District Court for the Northern District of California vacated by Thelton Henderson. Alsup was confirmed by the United States Senate on July 30, 1999, and received his commission on August 17, 1999. He assumed senior status on January 21, 2021. Alsup assumed inactive senior status on December 31, 2025.

== Notable cases ==
Alsup presided over the 2012 and 2016 jury trials in Oracle America, Inc. v. Google, Inc., which concerns the APIs of Java SE and Android. He drew media attention for his familiarity with programming languages, at one point criticizing Oracle counsel David Boies for arguing that the Java function rangeCheck was novel, saying that he had "written blocks of code like rangeCheck a hundred times or more". Alsup was widely described as having learned Java in order to better understand the case, although a 2017 profile in The Verge stated that he had not learned a significant amount of Java, but had rather applied his knowledge as a longtime hobbyist BASIC programmer. The Federal Circuit overturned his determination that the Java API was not copyrightable. In 2021 the U.S. Supreme Court made no decision on copyrightability but decided that, even if copyright existed, Google's use of the API had been fair use and so not unlawful.

Alsup was also the presiding judge in what is believed to be the first trial against the U.S. No Fly List, which is a list of people who cannot use commercial aircraft in the United States. Regarding the removal of people incorrectly included in the list, he ruled that, "[t]he government's administrative remedies fall short of such relief and do not supply sufficient due process."

In August 2020, Judge Alsup sentenced Anthony Levandowski to 18 months in prison for one count of trade secret theft, for stealing technology from Google's Waymo to create Otto, a self driving startup, then selling it to Uber six months later for $680 million. In May 2017, Judge Alsup had ordered Levandowski to refrain from working on Otto's Lidar and required Uber to disclose its discussions on the technology.

=== Deferred Action for Childhood Arrivals ===
In September 2017, Judge Alsup was assigned four cases by parties suing to halt President Trump's decision to end the Deferred Action for Childhood Arrivals program created by Barack Obama. On December 20, the Supreme Court unanimously issued an opinion urging Judge Alsup to consider arguments by the Trump administration that ending DACA was within executive authority and is not reviewable by federal courts.

On January 9, 2018, he granted a temporary injunction halting President Trump's rescission of DACA.

=== Dismissal of lawsuit against ExxonMobil ===
On July 27, 2018, Judge Alsup dismissed a lawsuit targeting ExxonMobil on the basis that two California cities, San Francisco and Oakland, could not prove the energy company was responsible for climate change in the state.

=== Student loans ===
On November 17, 2022, Alsup ruled in favor of 200,000 student loan borrowers in a class action lawsuit who claim that they were defrauded by for-profit colleges/universities. Alsup called the program's backlog "an impossible quagmire..." As of now, approximately 443,000 borrowers have pending borrower-defense applications. That is a staggering number. If, hypothetically, the Department's Borrower Defense Unit had all 33 of its claim adjudicators working 40 hours a week, 52 weeks a year (no holidays or vacation), with each claim adjudicator processing two claims per day, it would take the Department more than twenty-five years to get through the backlog." Alsup's ruling was based on borrower defense, which allows students to have their loans forgiven if the university lies to them about their job prospects, credit transferability or likely salary after graduation.

On December 11, 2025, Alsup denied the government's bid to delay resolution of "post-class" claims, which were filed between June 23 and July 17, 2022. The government is required to resolve those claims by January 28, 2026.

=== Mass firings ===
On February 27, 2025, Alsup ruled that mass firings ordered by the Office of Personnel Management at the behest of Elon Musk's DOGE are likely illegal. The mass firings included employees from the Department of War (DOW), Park Service, Bureau of Land Management (BLM), and National Science Foundation. Alsup said:

How could so much of the workforce be amputated, suddenly, overnight? It's so irregular and so widespread and so aberrant in the history of our country. How could this all happen with each agency deciding on its own to do something so aberrational? ... The Office of Personnel Management does not have any authority whatsoever, under any statute in the history of the universe, to hire and fire employees at another agency. They can hire and fire their own employees.

Then, on March 13, 2025, Alsup ordered the reinstatement of thousands of employees in six different federal agencies.

Then, on April 8, 2025, The U.S. Supreme Court stayed Senior U.S. District Judge William Alsup’s March 25, 2025 reinstatement order.

In the June 2026 ruling Trump v. Slaughter, the Supreme Court ruled 6-3 that the President has the Constitutional authority to fire heads and commissioners of independent regulatory agencies (like the Federal Trade Commission) at will.

President Trump then signed an Executive Order reclassifying nearly 10,000 senior federal workers. Under the new classification, these workers could be fired at will.

The Office of Personnel Management (OPM), in demonstrating their authority, finalized a sweeping rule expanding the grounds for terminating rank-and-file workers using “suitability and fitness” standards, removing workers who could not demonstrate fitness for their position. A standard regularly applied in the private sector.

=== Copyright ===
In a lawsuit against Anthropic, Alsup wrote, "To summarize the analysis that now follows, the use of the books at issue to train Claude and its precursors was exceedingly transformative and was a fair use under Section 107 of the Copyright Act."

== Personal life ==
Alsup moved to California in the 1970s. He owns a 40-acre ranch in the Sierra Nevada foothills. In 2002 he published Missing in the Minarets, a book telling the story of the search for mountaineer Walter A Starr, Jr.

== Awards and recognition ==
- 2013: Tara L. Riedley Barristers Choice Award, Bar Association of San Francisco
- 2013: Award of recognition from Lewis and Clark Law School.

== See also ==
- List of law clerks for the fourth seat of the Supreme Court of the United States

== Sources ==
Legal offices
Preceded by Thelton Henderson	Judge of the United States District Court for the Northern District of California; 1999–2021	Succeeded by Jacqueline Scott Corley
