= All India Muslim Jamaat =

Barelvi organization

- آل انڈیا مسلم جماعت
- Abbreviation: AIMJ
- Formation: 17 September 2022; 4 years ago
- Type: Non-governmental Religious organization
- Legal status: Active
- Purpose: Protection of rights of Barelvi Muslims
- Headquarters: Grand Mufti House, Bareilly district, Uttar Pradesh
- Region served: Global
- Official languages: Urdu Hindi and English
- President: Shahabuddin Razvi

All India Muslim Jamaat (Urdu: آل انڈیا مسلم جماعت, abbr. AIMJ) is an Indian Non-governmental religious organization belonging to the Barelvi movement of Sunni Islam. It was established on 17 September 2022 at the residence of Mannan Raza Khan, brother of Akhtar Raza Khan on the occasion of 104th Urs-e-Razvi of Ahmed Raza Khan Barelvi. Shahabuddin Razvi is the President of this organization.

== Activities ==
All India Muslim Jamaat openly supported the Government of India's decision on banning Popular Front of India, they claimed PFI as a radical group. They previously demanded Government to impose ban on the organization, saying that they follow a radicalized ideology and appealed Sunni Barelvi and Sufi Muslims to maintain distance from such organizations. The committee stated that these organizations should be banned to safeguard the Unity of the Country.

On 17 September 2022, a meeting was held at Bareilly Sharif Dargah located at the 'Islamic Research Center', which was presided by Shahabuddin Razvi, National President of AIMJ.

In February 2023, Shahabuddin Razvi, the President of AIMJ stated that the All India Muslim Personal Law Board is going so far from their ideology, it was established to look into the interference in Muslim laws, but the organization is now into the Political matter.
