= Shahabuddin Razvi =

20th century Indian scholar

Maulana Shahabuddin Razvi Bareilvi
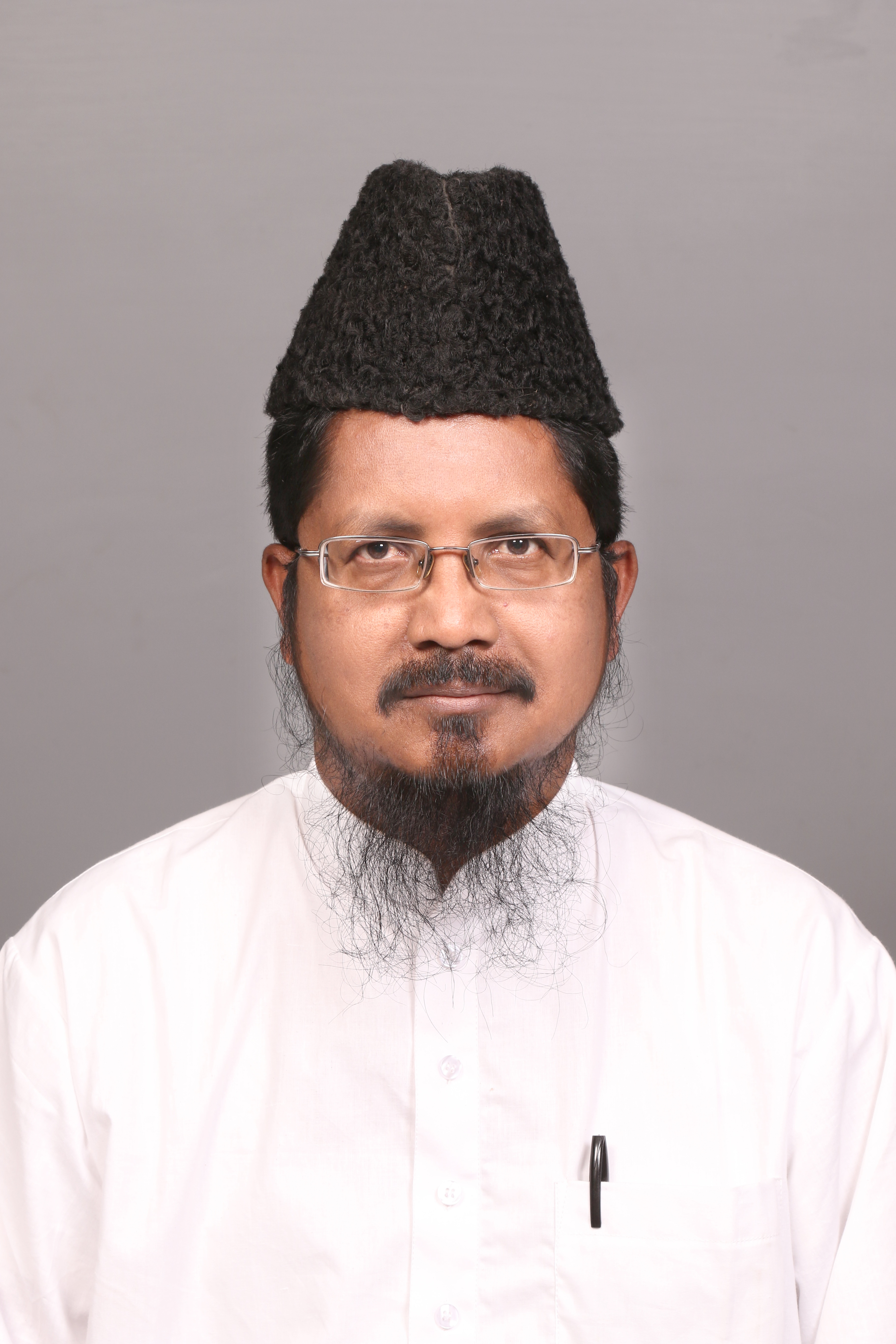

Personal life
- Born: Bahraich, Uttar Pradesh, India

Religious life
- Religion: Islam
- Denomination: Sunni
- Jurisprudence: Hanafi

Shahabuddin Razvi, known with his honorific as Maulana Shahabuddin Razvi Bareilvi (urdu: مولانا شہاب الدین رضوی) (born 4 April 1974, in Bahraich, U.P) is an Indian Islamic scholar, historical writer and social worker. He is working on Pasmanda cause since last Ten Years. He is also the President of one of the largest Sunni Sufi Organisation All India Muslim Jamaat and the founder of Islamic Research Center, and National General Secretary of the All India Tanzeem Ulma e Islam.According to the book Life of Akhtar Raza Khan (Azhari Miya), Razvi was among Azhari's closest confidants, spending 30 years with him at major conferences in India and abroad. Azhari Miyan was so impressed by Razvi's work that he would say, "Bring me more someone just like Shahabuddin."

He was general secretary of the All India Jamat raza-e-Mustafa. and currently holds the position of Chief Mufti in Chashma-e-Darul Ifta Bareilly.

== As a Writer ==
He is the author of books on Islamic History, theology and thought in English, Urdu, and Hindi. His books include:

- Tareekh Jamat Raza e Mustafa (Hindi/Urdu)
- Mufti E Azam Hind Ke Khulfa (Urdu)
- Hayate Tajushshariya (Hindi/Urdu)
- Rasayle Tajushshariya (Urdu)
- Karamate Tajushshariya (Hindi/Urdu)
- Tareekh e Islam (Volumes 6, Urdu)

== Popular Statements ==
Razvi held a press conference at the time of Uttar Pradesh assembly elections and appealed to all political parties to stop spreading hatred among communities, maintain peace and communal harmony. He further said that SP wants Muslim votes but not Muslim leaders.

In a press conference Shahabuddin Razvi targeted Akhilesh Yadav and said that the Samajwadi Party is built on the basis of Muslims, and does not even talk about Muslim issues, now the time has come that we should think about some other party.

In an interview with CNN-News18 TV channel in December 2021, Razvi said that we will start a movement, The Akhand Bharat, which aims to unite India and make a strong country.

Rejecting UK Labour MP Naz Shah tweet on human rights in India, Indian scholar Maulana Shahabuddin Razvi Barelvi said in his official statement that Muslims live here peacefully and interference of any foreign nation in India's internal matter is not justified. Razvi further advises Naaz Shah not to try to convert his 'India Phobia' into 'Islamophobia'.
