= DFRAC =

Indian fact-checking organization

- Digital Forensics, Research and Analytics Center
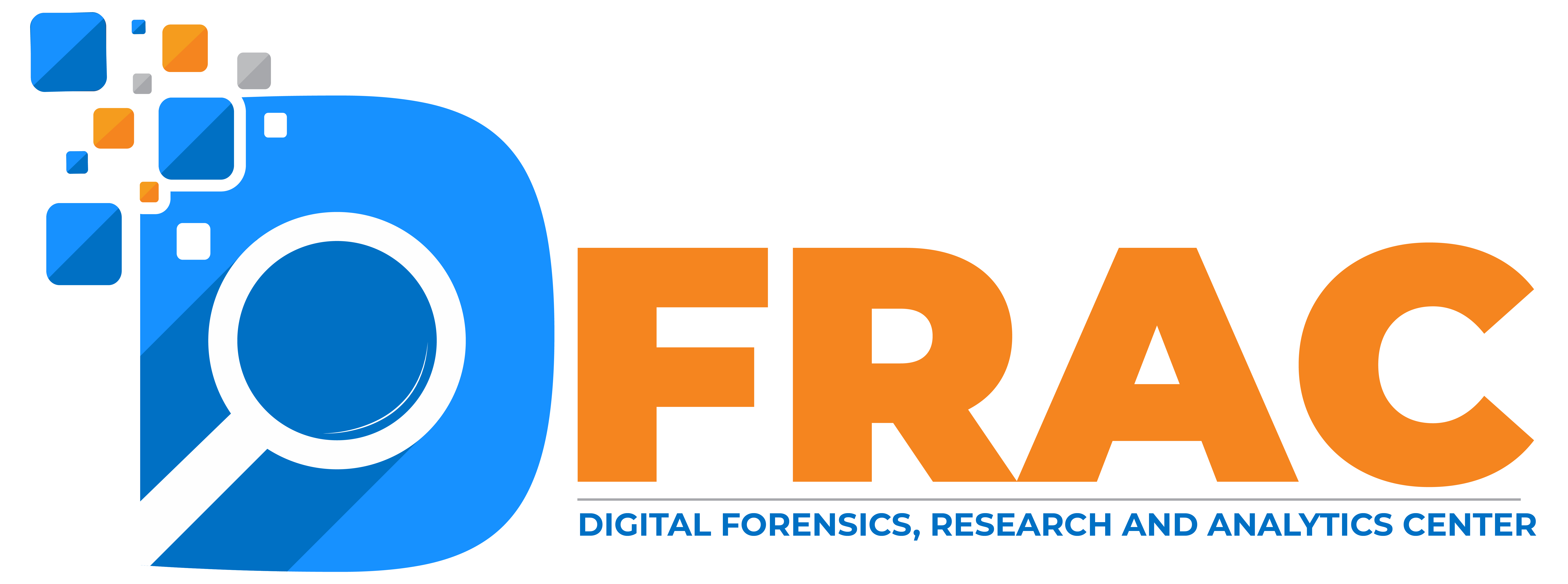
- Abbreviation: DFRAC
- Formation: 20 July 2021; 4 years ago
- Founder: Prashant Tandon and Dr. Shujaat Ali Quadri
- Headquarters: G-28, Hazrat Nizamuddin West, New Delhi, India
- Website: https://dfrac.org

Digital Forensics, Research and Analytics Center (DFRAC) is an Indian non-profit organization founded by Shujaat Ali Quadri and Prashant Tandon in 2021. It primarily focuses on fact-checking and hate speech.

The DFRAC is a verified signatory of the International Fact-Checking Network (IFCN).

== Famous works ==
In November 2021, DFRAC fact-checked on Devi Chitralekha marry a Muslim man.

In June 2022, DFRAC conducted a report on the Prophet Row, analysing the Pakistan-Based disinformation campaign.

In September 2022, DFRAC made a report on Arshdeep to Shami: How are the Pakistani Twitterati fueling wrath against Indian cricketers?
