= Acquisition of Activision Blizzard by Microsoft =

Business acquisition held from 2022 to 2023

- Initiator: Microsoft
- Target: Activision Blizzard
- Type: Full acquisition
- Cost: US$75.4 billion
- Initiated: January 18, 2022; 4 years ago
- Completed: October 13, 2023; 3 years ago

On January 18, 2022, Microsoft announced its intent to acquire Activision Blizzard for $68.7 billion. The acquisition was completed on October 13, 2023, with its total cost amounting to $75.4 billion. Under the terms of the agreement, Microsoft brought Activision Blizzard under its Microsoft Gaming business unit as a sibling division to Xbox Game Studios and ZeniMax Media. With it, Microsoft gained ownership of several franchises under Activision, Blizzard Entertainment, and King, including Call of Duty, Crash Bandicoot, Spyro, Warcraft, StarCraft, Diablo, Overwatch, and Candy Crush. It is the largest video game acquisition by transaction value in history.

Following shareholder approval of the acquisition, the merger was reviewed by several national anti-trust bodies, with early approvals granted by the European Commission and China's State Administration for Market Regulation (SAMR), among others. The United States' Federal Trade Commission (FTC) and the United Kingdom's Competition and Markets Authority (CMA) issued formal challenges to the acquisition. Sony also criticized the merger, concerned that Microsoft would make the lucrative Call of Duty franchise exclusive to the Xbox platform, though Microsoft committed to non-exclusivity through 2033. The FTC withdrew its request after courts did not find their anti-trust compelling to block the merger, while Microsoft offered to offload its cloud gaming support for Activision Blizzard's games for ten years to Ubisoft to appease the CMA.

== Background ==
Activision Blizzard is one of the largest video game publishers in the world, with annual revenues of about $8.8 billion in 2021. The company is composed of five business units: Activision Publishing, Blizzard Entertainment, King, Major League Gaming (which shut down in 2024), and Activision Blizzard Studios. Among its assets are ownership of Call of Duty, Crash Bandicoot, and Spyro from Activision's studios; Warcraft, Diablo, StarCraft, and Overwatch from Blizzard Entertainment; and Candy Crush Saga from King.

Microsoft is a dominant player in computing software, and also makes the Xbox line of game consoles and operates Xbox Game Studios, a collection of developers to create first party titles. In March 2021, Microsoft closed on its acquisition of ZeniMax Media and Bethesda Softworks for an estimated $7.5 billion, making it one of the largest video game acquisitions by that time.

== History ==
On January 18, 2022, Microsoft announced its intent to acquire Activision Blizzard for $68.7 billion in an all-cash deal, or approximately $95 per share. Activision Blizzard's stock price jumped nearly 40% that day in pre-market trading. The deal would make Microsoft the third-largest gaming company in the world and the largest headquartered in the Americas, behind Chinese company Tencent and the Japanese conglomerate Sony. If closed, it would also be the most expensive video game-related acquisition in to date. Goldman Sachs will serve as the financial advisor to Microsoft, and Allen & Company will be Activision's financial advisors. Simpson Thacher will serve as legal advisor for Microsoft while Skadden will serve as legal advisor for Activision. The deal has been approved by both companies' board of directors and is expected to close in 2023 following international government regulatory review of the action. Upon completion of the deal, Activision Blizzard would be a sibling entity to Xbox Game Studios under a new Microsoft Gaming division with Phil Spencer as its lead. The deal would also allow Microsoft to offer Activision Blizzard games on its Xbox Game Pass service. Spencer also spoke about reviving some older Activision Blizzard franchises he himself enjoyed, mentioning series such as King's Quest, Guitar Hero and Hexen: Beyond Heretic.

Activision Blizzard's CEO, Bobby Kotick, stated that he, Spencer, and Microsoft's CEO Satya Nadella have had discussions in 2021 on their concern of the power of Tencent, NetEase, Apple, Inc. and Google, and that Activision Blizzard lacked the computation expertise in machine learning and data analytics that would be necessary to compete with these companies. According to Kotick, this led to the idea of Microsoft, which does have those capabilities, acquiring Activision Blizzard at an attractive price point. Kotick further stated in a 2025 interview that these discussions initially started in 2020 when Microsoft was trying to acquire TikTok from ByteDance. Kotick, who had connections with ByteDance's founder Zhang Yiming, found that Yiming would rather have Activision buy TikTok over Microsoft, and as Activision could not out spend Microsoft on the purchase, suggested to Nadella that they partner on co-ownership, where the first suggestion of Microsoft acquiring Activision was raised. While the TikTok deal never happened, the acquisition of Activision remained on discussion.

Spencer further had stated that Microsoft's intent with the acquisition is access to Activision's mobile games, which would include those by its King division such as Candy Crush Saga. He said that while there are 200 million game console users worldwide, the mobile market reaches over 3 billion people. In a statement released on Activision Blizzard's investor website, the company said its industry is the "most dynamic and exciting category of entertainment across all platforms" and that gaming will be the forefront of the development of the emerging metaverse. Some journalists saw this acquisition, and Microsoft's March 2021 acquisition of Bethesda Softworks, as a bid to compete against Meta Platforms, formerly known as Facebook.

The announcement had come in the wake of events related to California Department of Fair Employment and Housing v. Activision Blizzard, a lawsuit raised in July 2021 accusing the company of sexual harassment, employment discrimination and retaliation on the part of Activision Blizzard. Allegations had expanded by November 2021 to include actions that Kotick had done. The timing of the acquisition was reported by The Wall Street Journal and Bloomberg News to be in response to the ongoing DFEH lawsuit. Reports from both newspapers stated that Activision Blizzard had been considering a buyout from other companies, including Facebook parent company Meta Platforms, due to the weaker than expected financial performance of their latest game releases and production delays. Based on SEC filings related to the merger, Microsoft approached Activision Blizzard again in the days immediately following the November 2021 Wall Street Journal report regarding a buyout. While Kotick had been hesitant about selling the company, the board had gone ahead with the deal as they continued to fear the ongoing impact of the lawsuit while Kotick remained on the board. The buyout would provide a graceful exit for Kotick in the future, ranging in $252.2–292.9 million over most scenarios.

According to official announcements, under the deal Kotick will remain the CEO of Activision Blizzard, and is expected to keep the position while the deal goes through regulatory processes, as Activision Blizzard remains independent from Microsoft until the deal closes. According to The Wall Street Journal, Kotick "will depart once the deal closes" under Microsoft's management, while Kotick said in an interview that he has an interest in remaining in the company. Microsoft has yet to speak directly about the Activision Blizzard lawsuit following news of the acquisition, however the company announced a week prior that it would be reviewing its own sexual harassment and gender discrimination policies.

Activision Blizzard's shareholders approved of the acquisition near-unanimously in April 2022.

The deal was set to close by July 18, 2023, after which Microsoft would owe Activision Blizzard $3 billion if the deal failed to close. However, the companies would be able to mutually extend the deadline, or if the deal expired, renegotiate the terms. By this date, as described below, the UK's Competition and Markets Authority, after an initial ruling denying the merger, had extended their deadline to August 29, 2023, to rule on a new proposal by Microsoft. It was later extended their deadline to the same day as the acquisition closing date to provide its Phase 1 investigation of the merger. The companies agreed to extend the close of the acquisition until October 18, 2023, as to resolve the CMA issue. Following the CMA's approval of the revised terms on October 13, 2023, Microsoft completed the acquisition of Activision Blizzard the same day.

== Regulatory response ==
Due to the size of the acquisition, the deal was required to be reviewed by several government commerce bodies for antitrust concerns. Countries including Saudi Arabia, Chile, Japan, China and South Korea approved the deal.

Jurisdiction	Commission	Status	Date	Ref.
United States	Federal Trade Commission (FTC)	Challenge dropped	May 22, 2025	
Australia	Australian Competition & Consumer Commission (ACCC)	Review discontinued (Note: The Australian Competition & Consumer Commission opened an informal review of the acquisition, but after the deal closed on October 13, 2023, it discontinued the review.)	October 16, 2023	
United Kingdom	Competition and Markets Authority (CMA)	Approved (Note: The CMA blocked the original deal, but approved the proposed restructure in which Microsoft divested the cloud gaming rights of Activision Blizzard games to Ubisoft.)	October 13, 2023	
European Union (Note: Representing 31 countries (27 EU member states and 4 EFTA member states))	European Commission (EC)	Approved (Note: Approved with behavioral remedies)	May 15, 2023	

=== U.S. Federal Trade Commission (FTC) ===
In the United States, the acquisition was reviewed by the Federal Trade Commission (FTC) rather than traditionally by the U.S. Department of Justice, as the agency had raised more concerns over mergers and acquisitions in the Big Tech sector in the last decade. U.S. Senators Elizabeth Warren, Bernie Sanders, Sheldon Whitehouse, and Cory Booker expressed their concerns about the merger to the FTC as part of the FTC's investigation, saying that both companies have "failed to protect the rights and dignity of their workers" and that the merger should be opposed if "the transaction is likely to enhance monopoly power and worsen the negotiating position between workers and the parties." The FTC formally stated its intention to block the acquisition as proposed on December 8, 2022. The FTC expressed concern that the acquisition would harm consumers of Activision Blizzard's games and give Microsoft too much control of certain parts of the industry, such as cloud gaming. The FTC also pointed to the acquisition of Zenimax, which the FTC claimed that Microsoft had agreed to a concession from the European Union to not make their games exclusive to the Xbox and later broke. In a statement made to Axios' Stephan Totilo, the European Commission stated that they had cleared Microsoft's acquisition of Zenimax unconditionally as they saw no "material impact" on the gaming market even if Microsoft made Zenimax's titles exclusive.

Microsoft responded to the FTC's complaint that Sony itself is one of the largest platforms with exclusive titles that contractually cannot be made for Xbox. They also said they still plan to offer content for multiplayer Bethesda games like Elder Scrolls Online and Fallout 76 for all platforms to avoid undercutting the playerbase. Microsoft also initially challenged the constitutionality of the FTC due to the ability for the Commissioner to be removed by the President at will, and their use of administrative law judges to initially review cases, both which have founding in recent Supreme Court cases, but removed this language in an amended response, sticking to the video game market. In February 2023, the FTC denied a request by Sony to drop a subpoena filed by Microsoft, requesting internal documentation from Sony related to their third-party exclusivity deals. The FTC requested a temporary restraining order and a preliminary injunction to block the merger on June 12, 2023. The FTC stated that Microsoft and Activision Blizzard "have represented in the past that they cannot close their deal due to antitrust reviews of the transaction in other jurisdictions. But Microsoft and Activision have not provided assurances that they will maintain that position."

The court granted the temporary restraining order on June 13, 2023, while a hearing to determine if a preliminary injunction on the deal should be granted was held from June 22 to 30, 2023, before Judge Jacqueline Scott Corley. Microsoft said that if the injunction should be granted, they may consider abandoning the deal which they described as being a "three-year administrative nightmare". During the hearing, the FTC was focused on the effect of Call of Duty in the competitive market, console exclusivity, and the impact of the nascent cloud gaming field.

Judge Corley denied to apply a permanent injunction on July 11, 2023, lifting the temporary restraining order to allow Microsoft to proceed to close the deal, though the case will continue to trial later. Corley wrote, "For the reasons explained, the Court finds the FTC has not shown a likelihood it will prevail on its claim this particular vertical merger in this specific industry may substantially lessen competition. To the contrary, the record evidence points to more consumer access to Call of Duty and other Activision content." The FTC formally filed an appeal to Judge Corley's denial to the Court of Appeals for the Ninth Circuit on July 12, 2023. The FTC also filed a separate motion to Corley on July 13 arguing for another injunction until the Ninth Circuit had time to decide to stay Corley's previous ruling, but she denied that motion. The Ninth Circuit court denied the emergency appeal to block the merger on July 14, 2023.

The FTC formally withdrew its challenge to the acquisition on July 20, 2023, though they have announced their intent to refile at a later time. The FTC reopened its case against the merger on September 27, 2023, though was unable to block the merger from occurring.

In its first filings after the completion of the acquisition, in February 2024, the FTC argued that the 1,900 job cuts made in January 2024 went against assurances that Microsoft had made in their previous documents, arguing for final completion of the deal to be paused while their new complaint was considered. While Microsoft had stated that the job cuts were in areas of overlap between the companies, the FTC stated this action was "inconsistent with Microsoft's suggestion to this court that the two companies will operate independently post-merger". The FTC further amended its case in July 2024, following Microsoft's announcement of rate increases for Game Pass and the creation of a low-cost tier that removed day-one access to games. The FTC said the move was inconsistent with the assurances Microsoft gave the court prior to acquisition, and considered the new tier a "degraded product" that, along with price increases, harmed consumers.

The Ninth Circuit denied the FTC's appeal in early May 2025, leading to the FTC dropping the case by May 22, 2025.

=== European Commission ===
After receiving a formal notification by Microsoft on September 30, 2022, the European Commission (EC) began its first phase review of the acquisition under the EU merger law. The Commission sent out a questionnaire to several game industry firms to ask them about the potential impact of the acquisition on their livelihood, including if Microsoft does opt to lock rivals out of Activision games in the future. The Commission announced on November 8, 2022, that it would conduct an additional review of the merger "to ensure that the gaming ecosystem remains vibrant to the benefit of users in a sector that is evolving at a fast pace".

The EC filed its formal complaint against the acquisition on February 3, 2023. The EC said they considered that Microsoft may be "incentivized to block access to Activision's popular Call of Duty franchise", which could lead to "reduce competition in the markets for the distribution of console and PC video games, leading to higher prices, lower quality and less innovation for console game distributors, which may, in turn, be passed on to consumers". Microsoft met with the EC regulators on February 21, 2023, announcing that they had secured a ten-year agreement with Nintendo to bring Call of Duty to that platform alongside the Xbox release, as well as a separate ten-year agreement providing Call of Duty and other first-party Microsoft games with Nvidia as part of their GeForce Now streaming service.

The EC approved the acquisition on May 15, 2023. Among concessions that Microsoft had made were the numerous deals to allow Activision Blizzard games to be played on cloud gaming services, believing this would help grow that sector. The Commission dismissed the concerns about platform exclusivity, as Microsoft had reason why it would not be financially viable to withhold Call of Duty from other platforms. And even if they did, Sony had the capacity with their own studios to compete fairly. Ahead of the October 2023 closure, the Commission affirmed that the changes made to appease the UK regulators remained sufficient from their side, and no further review of the acquisition was needed.

=== UK Competition and Markets Authority ===
The UK's Competition and Markets Authority (CMA) stated its intent to perform a higher-level review of the acquisition in August 2022. The phase 1 ruling, issued on September 1, 2022, said that the merger "may be expected to result in a substantial lessening of competition within a market or markets in the United Kingdom". Preliminary findings of phase 2 of the investigation was reported on February 8, 2023, concluding that the acquisition "could result in higher prices, fewer choices, and less innovation for UK gamers", as well as less competition in the console and cloud gaming spaces. The CMA has recommended that Activision should at least divest the Call of Duty franchise. However, following Microsoft's commitments to ensure the release of Call of Duty on multiple platforms for ten years, in association with meeting other regulatory bodies, the CMA changed its stance by late March 2023. In its new statement, the CMA said "While the CMA's original analysis indicated that this strategy would be profitable under most scenarios, new data (which provides better insight into the actual purchasing behaviour of CoD gamers) indicates that this strategy would be significantly loss-making under any plausible scenario."

The CMA formally ruled against the merger on April 26, 2023. Among various reasons, CMA stated that Microsoft had already a strong position in cloud gaming, and the merger would only strengthen that position. CMA also stated that Microsoft's concessions related to the 10-year contracts for Call of Duty on other platforms were not enough to satisfy their concerns, and doubted that Microsoft would be able to port Call of Duty onto the Nintendo Switch. The CMA further prevented Microsoft to initiate any acquisition of Activision again in the future without seeking pre-clearance from the CMA. Microsoft filed its appeal to the decision by the end of May, outlining five points of rebuttal mostly around the CMA's assessment of the cloud gaming market and Microsoft's current position within it. The appeals process could extend the potential completion of the merger to the end of 2023 if not into 2024.

The CMA's decision had become subject to political debate within the UK, particularly after the European Commission approved the deal. Current prime minister Rishi Sunak aimed to make the UK the tech industry leader in the European region, and the CMA's blockage ran against that position. Representatives of the CMA have defended their position to members of Parliament, standing their ground that the proposed merger would give Microsoft too much of an advantage.

Following the decision from Judge Corley to deny the injunction for the FTC, Microsoft, Activision/Blizzard, and the CMA have agreed and asked to the Competition Appeal Tribunal (CAT) to pause their legal battle to negotiate. The CAT adjourned the hearing on July 21, 2023. The CMA announced on July 14, 2023, that they would be extending their investigation, originally set to close before the July 18, 2023, acquisition deadline, for six weeks to August 29, 2023, pending review of a new proposal that Microsoft had submitted to the CMA.

Later in August 2023, Microsoft announced a 15-year agreement with Ubisoft to license Activision Blizzard titles for cloud gaming services, contingent on the successful completion of the merger (which would include the ability to offer them as part of its Ubisoft+ service, as well as the ability for Ubisoft to sub-license these rights to other competitors), a move that had been projected to appease the CMA. The CMA stated that while this appeared to meet their concerns, they will still review the deal through a Phase 1 investigation, which is expected to complete by the extended merger deadline, October 18, 2023. The CMA stated on September 22, 2023, that they considered the revised acquisition to be provisionally approved, as while the sale of the cloud gaming rights satisfied the group's primary concern, there were some limited residual concerns to resolve before giving full approval by October 13. The CMA approved the revised terms for acquisition on October 13, 2023.

Due to criticism it received over how it handled the review, the CMA announced in November 2023 that it plans to revamp its procedures to make it more open to change of merger terms, among other facets.

=== Others ===
The U.S. Securities and Exchange Commission (SEC) reviewed potential claims that investors close to Kotick engaged in insider trading prior to the acquisition announcement. Activision Blizzard said they would fully cooperate with the SEC's review. South Africa's Competition Commission approved the merger in April 2023.

The deal is also seeing review in Australia, New Zealand, and elsewhere. In December 2022, Chile's regulatory authority (Fiscalia Nacional Economica) voted to approve the deal in Phase 1. The Japan Fair Trade Commission had also given approval for the merger by March 2023. On May 19, 2023, China's State Administration for Market Regulation approved the Microsoft's Activision Blizzard acquisition Korea Fair Trade Commission (KFTC) approved the Microsoft's Activision Blizzard acquisition on May 30, 2023.

=== Legal challenges ===
The New York City Employees' Retirement System, which are shareholders of Activision Blizzard, sued the company in April 2022, arguing that the company had made the acquisition deal quickly with Microsoft as to try to cover up the misdoings of Kotick that had been uncovered as part of the ongoing DCEH lawsuit and escape any liability.

Sjunde AP-Fonden, a Swedish-government run pension fund with investments in Activision-Blizzard, filed a lawsuit in November 2022 within the U.S. court system against Microsoft and Activision-Blizzard of collusion in establishing the deal. The lawsuit asserts that because of Activision-Blizzard's weakened position resulting from the workplace harassment lawsuit from the California DFEH, that Microsoft negotiated with Kotick and Activision-Blizzard to buy the company at a reduced price. The lawsuit also named Kotick for using the deal to cover up his alleged misconduct related to the DFEH suit.

A group of gamers filed suit against Microsoft in December 2022 to block the merger under the Clayton Antitrust Act of 1914 which enables consumers to file such lawsuits. The suit argues that should the merger go through, Microsoft's combined power would disrupt the video game marketplace, giving Microsoft the capability to outpace competitors and take a stronger hold. Microsoft failed to have the case dismissed in January 2023, and arguments related to a preliminary discussion was presented to the judge in March 2023. The judge dismissed the suit in March 2023, citing that the gamers had not shown sufficient evidence of harm to the industry should the merger go through. The gamers refiled their suit, using additional evidence and claims provided to them by Sony, in April 2023. The same federal court denied a preliminary injunction in the refiled case in May 2023, stating the plaintiffs failed to show how they would be damaged by the merger. The group subsequently filed an emergency request at the Supreme Court of the United States on July 16, 2023, to halt the merger, but this request was denied by the Court the next day. Both Microsoft and the players reached a settlement to terminate the lawsuit in October 2024.

== Reactions and commentary ==
Several Activision Blizzard employees have expressed cautious optimism with respect to the deal, with the ABK Workers Alliance, a group of employees pushing for unionization in the wake of the DFEH lawsuit, saying the acquisition did "not change the goals" of the Alliance. A report by Business Insider suggested several Microsoft employees have raised their concern on the deal with respect to the sexual harassment scandals and Activision Blizzard workplace culture, hoping for "concrete steps to make sure we aren't introducing a dangerous and unwelcome culture". On January 19, 2022, World Bank president David Malpass criticized the acquisition, contrasting the acquisition price with the smaller amount of bond financing available to developing countries during the COVID-19 pandemic. The AFL-CIO supports the merger due to Microsoft signing a labor neutrality pact between the Communications Workers of America (who also supports the merger) and the company that was signed following the announcement of the proposed acquisition.

Concerns on Microsoft's potential ownership of the Call of Duty franchise, which has sold over 400 million units by April 2021 and considered one of the most valuable properties within the video game industry, have been raised by Sony Interactive Entertainment and regulators. Shortly after the acquisition announcements, Sony had stated that they expect Microsoft to honor all of Activision Blizzard's publishing agreements for multiplatform games, assuring that Call of Duty would remain available on the PlayStation platform and not made a console-exclusive title. Spencer and Microsoft president Brad Smith reassured that Microsoft will continue these existing agreements and expressed their desire to keep Call of Duty and other popular Activision Blizzard games on PlayStation beyond the terms of these agreements, as well as explore the opportunity to bring these games to the Nintendo consoles.

Around September 2022, Xbox head Phil Spencer said Microsoft had written a letter to Sony in January, affirming their commitment to maintain Call of Duty on the PlayStation "several years" beyond the current contractual agreements set before the acquisition, which are said to last until 2024. Spencer said their offer to Sony "goes well beyond typical gaming industry agreements". Sony's president Jim Ryan responded to Spencer by stating that in their commitment, Microsoft only stated their intent to keep Call of Duty for three more years beyond the current contract terms, and that "their proposal was inadequate on many levels and failed to take account of the impact on our gamers. We want to guarantee PlayStation gamers continue to have the highest quality Call of Duty experience, and Microsoft's proposal undermines this principle." Public documents filed as part of the UK's investigation revealed that Microsoft would be limited by prior contractual agreements between Sony and Activision to provide Call of Duty on Xbox Game Pass for several years.

Microsoft stated that it had written to Sony on November 11, 2022, to agree to a ten-year commitment for Call of Duty to remain non-exclusive to Xbox. Sony further stated that Microsoft's intent with the acquisition is to remove Sony and PlayStation from competition with Microsoft and instead have the PlayStation platform more comparable to the Nintendo Switch, which Sony stated is based on taking up a family-friendly position and not attempting to compete with adult-rated games like Call of Duty. Besides the commitment to Sony, Microsoft also had committed in December 2022 to a similar ten-year deal to bring Call of Duty to Nintendo's platforms, further attempting to prove to regulators they had no intent to make the title exclusive to Xbox or Windows. By July 16, 2023, Sony signed to a "binding agreement" with Microsoft that committed to keeping Call of Duty on the PlayStation family.

A number of indie publishers and developers including Curve Games, Finji, Iam8bit, and Strange Scaffold expressed support for the deal according to 2023 court filings.

== Aftermath ==
Kotick stayed as the CEO of Activision Blizzard until December 29, 2023, after which he then retired from the company, as previously promised.

Over 2024 and 2025, Microsoft, as a whole, laid off portions of its workforce, including roles within the combined Microsoft Gaming division, cancelling multiple games that had been in development for years. Blizzard president Mike Ybarra and chief design officer Allen Adham left the company in January 2024. Johanna Faries, the general manager of the Call of Duty series, was named Blizzard's new president effective on February 5, 2024. Faries' appointment was a significant change for Blizzard, whose leaders have in the past come up through the ranks of gaming and tech.

Over 2025, Microsoft increased the retail price on its Xbox consoles twice in North America, citing the "changes in the macroeconomic environment", which included the tariffs placed on most imports by Donald Trump. Following news that Microsoft was raising the price of Xbox Game Pass by up to 50%, former FTC commissioner Lina Khan said "Microsoft's acquisition of Activision has been followed by significant price hikes and layoffs, harming both gamers and developers. As we've seen across sectors, increasing market consolidation and increasing prices often go hand-in-hand. As dominant firms become too-big-to-care, they can make things worse for their customers without having to worry about the consequences."

== See also ==
- United States v. Microsoft Corp.
- Microsoft litigation
- US antitrust law
