= Development of The Elder Scrolls IV: Oblivion =

Development of 2006 video game

An in-game screenshot showing Oblivion's user interface, HDR lighting and long draw distance, improvements made as part of a goal to create advanced graphics

The development of The Elder Scrolls IV: Oblivion began in 2002, immediately after its predecessor, The Elder Scrolls III: Morrowind, was published. Rumors of a sequel to Morrowind started circulating in June 2004; the sequel's title was identified on September 10, 2004, the date of its official announcement. Oblivion was developed by Bethesda Game Studios, and the initial Xbox 360 and personal computer (PC) releases were co-published by Bethesda Softworks and Take-Two Interactive's subsidiary, 2K Games. According to interviews with Bethesda staff, the publisher-developer relationship—one of the few independent relations in the industry—worked well, and Bethesda was not subject to excessive corporate guidance. Initially scheduled for a November 22, 2005, release, in tandem with the Xbox 360's launch, Oblivion was delayed to a March 21, 2006, release for Windows PCs and the Xbox 360.

Developers working on Oblivion focused on providing a tighter storyline, with fewer filler quests and more developed characters. The developers sought to make information in the game world more accessible to players, making the game easier to pick up and play. Oblivion features improved AI (which Bethesda calls Radiant AI), improved physics courtesy of the Havok physics engine, and impressive graphics, taking advantage of advanced lighting and shader routines like high-dynamic-range rendering (HDR) and specular mapping. Bethesda developed and implemented procedural content creation tools in the creation of Oblivion's terrain, leading to landscapes that are more complex and realistic than those of past titles, with less of a drain on Bethesda's staff.

A PlayStation 3 version of Oblivion was released on March 20, 2007, in North America, and April 27, 2007, in Europe, following delays similar to those for the Xbox 360 release. The PlayStation 3 release was touted for its improvement over the graphics of the PC and Xbox 360 versions, although some of the improved shader routines optimized for the PlayStation 3 release were set to be ported over to the other releases through patches. A plan to distribute content through downloads paid by micropayment was initially met with criticism by customers due to its alleged low value, but later releases—at a reduced price, and with more content—proved more popular.

== Business ==
=== Rumors and official announcements ===
The first rumors of another Elder Scrolls release after The Elder Scrolls III: Morrowind began to circulate in June 2004, following Bethesda's posting of an e-mail searching for new staff. The new staff members were to participate in a team that would push "the bleeding-edge of RPG development for the PC and future-generation consoles". For those considering the job, the e-mail suggested that "knowledge of ... The Elder Scrolls [is] a plus". At the time, a member of Bethesda's staff downplayed the importance of the last comment, noting that Bethesda would "obviously" prefer applicants familiar with the company's products. Rumors were confirmed on July 12, 2004, when it was announced that Fallout 3 and the next Elder Scrolls title would be published by Bethesda and produced by Todd Howard. The title of the release was listed on September 10, 2004, when Bethesda officially announced the identity of the game in question: The Elder Scrolls IV: Oblivion, followed by a feature in the October 2004 issue of Game Informer. At the time of the announcement, Bethesda had been working on Oblivion for two years (since 2002), just as Bethesda was completing work on Morrowind.

=== Release delays ===
Although preliminary reports from Reuters suggested an Oblivion release in tandem with the launch of the Xbox 360 on November 22, 2005, and the original announcement of the game set a release date of Winter 2005, Take-Two Interactive announced, during a conference call with analysts on October 31, 2005, that Oblivion's release was to be delayed until the second quarter of Take-Two's fiscal year. The new schedule would put the release between February and April 2006. The delay surprised many, especially online retailers, who had begun accepting pre-orders for consoles bundled with Oblivion. News of the delay came at a time following a burst of bad news from the company, including a 60% drop in expected earnings per share, the ongoing Hot Coffee minigame controversy, worse than average sales for the company's flagship Grand Theft Auto: San Andreas, sudden drops in share prices, and delays for other company products.

Most commentators blamed Take-Two's corporate governance; one analyst stated that the company's troubles were more "company-specific than market-driven", and another declared company CEO Paul Eibeler to be the "worst CEO of 2005", pointing to "setbacks on the rollouts of newer games" as evidence of his failure. Pete Hines, Vice President of PR and Marketing for Bethesda, and Todd Howard, executive producer for the game, gave an update about the delay on the weekend of November 6, 2005. They planned to provide updates every subsequent weekend until the game's release. A commentator from Joystiq complained of the vagueness of the updates: "they don't get any more specific than to say, 'There is work that still needs to be done'. In fact, they say this three times just to make sure we know how hard they are working ... While it's nice to see the development team taking time out to update the fans, if the announcements continue to be as vague as this one, I'd rather just see them spend the extra time on the actual game."

=== Product showings ===
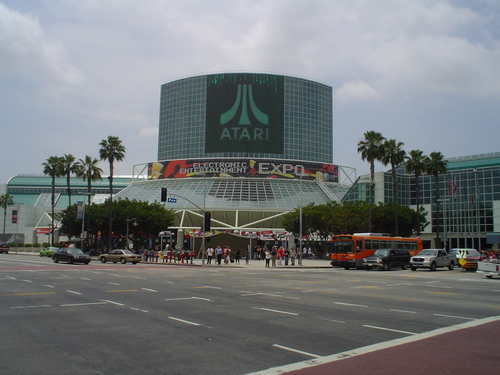
The Los Angeles Convention Center, where the Electronic Entertainment Expo (E3) was held

On May 16, 2005, Bethesda announced that they would be releasing Oblivion on Microsoft's Xbox 360 and that the game's public debut would come at the Electronic Entertainment Expo in Los Angeles on May 18, 2005. The version shown at E3 was substantially finished; most of the content was already in the game, lacking only the polish that the final months of development would bring. The game's world, for example, had already been fully constructed but still needed to undergo a "clutter pass", wherein minor game items—"books, weapons, and thousands of forks and plates"—are dropped into the game world.

Howard himself never took to the show. "It's like a beauty pageant", he told one reporter. "I have 20 minutes to give you a presentation on our games that by their nature are hard to demo in that time period, and then the person is going to check their watch and walk out and go see someone else's demo." Hines aimed to play against the standard convention at the show, avoiding the "noise and lights and heat and masses" of the show floor by retiring to a mini-theater—with air-conditioning, comfortable seating, and dim lighting—where attendees could comfortably watch. Howard agreed with the choice: "We've always taken sort of the meeting room approach. We don't have loud crazy booths."

During Microsoft's E3 pre-show conference, a ten-second preview of Oblivion was shown amid demo reels for other games. The preview consisted of a series of brief second-long shots of the game. Later on, during E3 proper, Bethesda showed a longer 25-minute demo that showcased further clipped scenes: the opening dungeon, a procedurally rendered forest, one of the game's towns, and other locales. Most viewers were impressed by Oblivion's showing. In the words of one reporter, "The Elder Scrolls IV: Oblivion isn't just one of the brightest gems in the Xbox 360's upcoming launch lineup, but it's also perhaps a perfect example of a next-generation role-playing game." Oblivion won a number of "best of" awards from a variety of game journalists: GameSpy's "RPG Game of Show" GameSpot's "Best RPG", IGN's "Best PC RPG", RPGFan's "Best Overall Game of E3 2005", and, most prestigiously, the "Best Role Playing Game" in the 2005 E3 Game Critics Awards.

A near-final build of Oblivion would later be shown at Microsoft's Consumer Electronics Show press tent—but not at its public Xbox 360 booth—in January 2006, showcasing the game's exteriors. A Joystiq reporter at the scene was not entirely impressed, finding the demo marred by long load times and slowdowns during combat. An Xbox representative reassured the reporter that all such issues would be worked out before the game's retail release. In the months prior to release, anticipation for the game ran high, with critics describing Oblivion as "the first next-gen game" only heightening attention. "People were expecting the game to cure blindness and heal the sick," said Hines.

=== Xbox 360 and PC release ===
After an almost four-month delay, Oblivion went gold on March 2, 2006, and was released for Microsoft Windows and Xbox 360 on March 21, 2006. Early rumors notwithstanding, Oblivion shipped on a single DVD-DL disc. One journalist voiced concern for the game's release date, as it was set in the same week as that of EA's The Godfather. Hines dismissed the suggestion, saying, "We tend to focus on what we can control and not worry about what we can't control. Given the level of interest and the number of pre-orders and so forth, we had a pretty good idea we'd be just fine no matter what else was happening that week." Oblivion was the first RPG title to be released for Microsoft's Xbox 360 console. In addition to the standard release version, a Collector's Edition was released for both Windows and Xbox 360 which includes the 112-page Pocket Guide to the Empire, a bonus DVD containing concept art, renders, and an approximately 45-minute-long documentary on the making of Oblivion, and a coin replica of the in-game currency of Tamriel. Its suggested release price of US$69.99 brought back "memories of game prices circa the Nintendo 64" for one Kotaku commentator. Some suggested that the included coin be used to create a "garish piece of jewelry".

Oblivion was well received in the gaming press; in fact, many were surprised that given how anticipated the game had been, reviews were as consistently positive as they were. Metacritic, an aggregate review site, gave the game a 94% score; IGN, GameSpot and GameSpy each gave the game their own individual "RPG of the Year" award. Oblivion also sold well, selling 1.7 million copies by April 10, 2006. Additionally, three million copies were sold by January 18, 2007. Pete Hines was satisfied with the release: "I feel like we delivered on what people expected ... I think the scores and awards reflect that we delivered on people's expectations."

=== PlayStation 3 release ===
The PS3 version of the game was ported/developed by 4J Studios who have worked with Bethesda in other projects. In April 2006, an inadvertently mailed version of Bethesda's supposed forthcoming game release list began a series of unconfirmed rumors of Oblivion releases for the PlayStation 3 and the PlayStation Portable (PSP). The list suggested that Oblivion would be a PlayStation 3 launch title and that the PSP version would be released in November. These rumors were confirmed on September 28, 2006, when Bethesda officially announced the titles, setting the PlayStation 3 version's North American release date for November 2006, European release date for March 2007, and the PSP version for Spring 2007. The two titles were set to be published by Bethesda alone in North America, and with Ubisoft as a co-publisher in Europe. Hines was mum regarding the change in publishers: "Too much backroom stuff." Ubisoft saw their first-quarter sales for 2007 rise 90.5%, to 134 million Euros, exceeding previous forecasts by 14 million Euros. Ubisoft CEO Yves Guillemot attributed the rise to "new-generation consoles and the impact of PlayStation 3 game sales, including Rainbow Six Vegas and Oblivion".

Despite the title being included in Sony's announced PlayStation 3 launch lineup at its annual Gamers' Day event in San Francisco, online retailers EBgames.com and Gamestop.com—two sites with a history of revealing the release dates of games before their publisher's announcements—were found on November 8, 2006, to have set Oblivion's release date as January 1, 2007. A few hours later, the delay was confirmed, as Pete Hines issued the statement that "Oblivion PS3 is now a Q1 2007 title". Hines gave no reason for the delay, but the news stirred suspicions of development difficulties working with the PlayStation 3, and that Bethesda was discouraged by the scarcity of PlayStation 3 consoles at launch. The North American PS3 release was later confirmed to be March 20, 2007, near the end of the first quarter window, with the European PS3 release set at April 27, 2007. Some reporters commented on a perceived parallelism between the Xbox 360 and PlayStation 3 delays and releases.

United Kingdom video games retailer GAME encountered distribution problems on release day in Europe. A branch on Oxford Street reported to Computer and Video Games (CVG), a video games magazine, that no units were in stock on the afternoon of April 27, 2007, and that other stores were in the same predicament. Other reports suggested that the game was not available in any of GAME's 400 UK and Ireland stores. GAME staff nonetheless told CVG reporters that copies would be available by next week, "possibly Monday". A Ubisoft representative attributed the shortage to high demand for the product and stated that copies were available online and at other High Street retailers. Other retailers, such as HMV and Virgin Megastore, reported no shortages.

== Production and design ==
=== Staff ===
In 2002, Bethesda's Elder Scrolls team was split in two: half, mostly designers and artists, were sent to work on Morrowind's expansions; and the rest, primarily programmers, were sent to work on technology for Oblivion. Ken Rolston, a former designer for Morrowind, was signed on as the game's Lead Designer. Code for the PC and Xbox 360 were somewhat interchangeable, owing to the similarity in system architecture between the consoles, but the team still had to divide its programming staff between the two. A number of staff with experience in developing for Sony platforms like the PlayStation 2 worked on optimizing the code for the subsequent PlayStation 3 release. The art and design staff were mostly unaffected by the need to develop for multiple consoles.

=== Publisher relations ===
On February 3, 2005, Bethesda entered into an agreement with Take-Two Interactive regarding the publication and release of Oblivion. Under the agreement, Bethesda would retain full control over Oblivion's development and the rights to any possible sequels, and Take-Two would agree to publish the game under its recently formed 2K Games sub-brand. According to Producer Gavin Carter, the team's experience was a rarity in the industry; few independent developer-publisher relationships still exist, and it was a surprise that Bethesda's experience worked out as well as it did. Carter described Take-Two's role as one of minimal interference, and the company mostly left Bethesda's development teams alone, trusting them to produce a "fantastic product" with minimal intervention or "red tape". The relationship was a rarity in the industry, according to Carter, where most developers are beholden to their publishers. Ashley Cheng, Oblivion's senior producer, concurred. There was "complete freedom" at Bethesda to decide their own path, whatever market trends might say. Of the legal proceedings affecting Bethesda's parent company ZeniMax during the initial stages of game development, when Bethesda founder Christopher Weaver sued the company for severance pay, Todd Howard said that he, as a producer, wasn't involved with corporate affairs. "I just focus on the games."

=== Design goals ===
Martin Septim, the "chosen one" of Oblivion's main quest, was not the player character, but a non-player character.

The team's goal then was, in the words of Todd Howard, to "create the quintessential RPG of the next generation", with a focus on a "combination of freeform gameplay and cutting-edge graphics". Producing for next-generation machines, rather than a cheap upgrade, gave Bethesda an additional four years of development. Howard describes this as an aspect of Bethesda's greater goal of "Reinvention", where the team's goal is to make "a new game that stands on its own, that has its own identity". Howard spoke of the need to avoid repetition, to avoid merely adding "some new features and content, and keep doing that", describing that path as "a good way to drive your games into the ground". Bethesda, Howard stated, would focus instead on recapturing what made its past titles exciting "in the first place".

Keeping with the spirit of past games, Howard promised to continue with the spirit of "big-world, do-anything"-style games, feeling that a certain size and number of choices were needed to make role-playing feel "meaningful"; but now there was to be greater emphasis on keeping the game focused. Pete Hines saw the developments between games as less an issue of design focus and more as a "natural side effect of improving and refining how the game works". If smart decisions were made, ease of play would naturally follow. Oblivion would include fewer NPCs and quests than Morrowind, and mindless filler, which Howard felt the team had been guilty of in the past, would be avoided. In exchange, Producer Gavin Carter later explained, there would be a greater focus on length and depth in the quests, adding more "alternate paths", more characters "to connect with, who actually have personalities". Carter cast negative aspersions on aspects of gameplay too far removed from the game's central plot. Carter said such material was not needed, preferring instead that the focus be on the plot, on "fighting these demon lords", and that further material is "tertiary" and "takes away".

The role of the player character in the main quest was to be changed as well. In contrast to past games, where the player character would play a type of "chosen one", Oblivion would have the player character "find him, protect him, and help him". Aside from that, in the opinion of Hines, "the main quest has similar themes and tones as in past Elder Scrolls games", and should still feel "epic", simply because of the way the gamespace is designed: with openness in mind. Improving that aspect of the experience, said Hines, came mostly in the form of improved information presentation. The system would not intrude on the experience when the player merely wishes to "walk around and explore the world and do whatever he/she wants", but given the scenario where the player begins wondering how to progress further into the main story, the game would provide a ready answer, so as to avoid confusion.

=== Technology ===
The Xbox 360 was set as Oblivion's base platform, being the "easiest to develop for", in the words of Pete Hines; the PC was considered more like a "random amalgamation of graphics cards and RAM and processors", and poorly "defined". As they had done with previous games in the series, Bethesda threw out their old content and technology and began work anew. A new engine was envisioned, one which would take advantage of advanced lighting and shader routines, like high-dynamic-range rendering and specular mapping. The final product was shipped with an engine formed of a mixture of in-house tech and Numerical Design Limited's Gamebryo engine, "tricked out" in collaboration with Bethesda's graphics programmers and NDL. Cheng has described the game as "pixel-shader heavy", taking advantage of the feature in rendering "metal, wood, stone, blood, skin", in addition to water, which was the only use Morrowind made of the technology. In particular, Oblivion uses normal maps, diffuse maps, specular maps, and parallax maps, which Howard described as "kind of like displacement mapping". Oblivion makes use of Radiant AI, a new artificial intelligence system that allows non-player characters to react and interact with the world around them dynamically. General goals, such as "Eat at this city at 2pm" are given to NPCs, and NPCs are left to determine how to achieve them. The absence of individual scripting for each character allowed for the construction of a world on a much larger scale than other games had developed, and aided in the creation of what Todd Howard described as an "organic feel" for the game.

Features introduced for the new release that had been absent in Morrowind included "full facial animations, lip synching, and full speech for all dialogue". Oblivion uses Havok as its physics engine, following in the footsteps of Half-Life 2. Havok is involved in modeling the game's representations of telekinesis, theft, traps, tumbling, paralysis, area effect fireball explosions, and the contact between arrows and their targets. Arrows, in Oblivion, may lodge themselves in objects and thereby increase their mass.

The inclusion of procedural content tools allowed for the creation of realistic environments at much faster rates than was the case with Morrowind. Using Interactive Data Visualization, Inc. (IDV)'s SpeedTree technology, for example, Bethesda artists were able to "quickly generate complex and organic tree shapes with relative ease". With its "parent/child hierarchies and iterative branch levels comprised of highly modifiable cylinder primitives", Bethesda's Noah Berry attests that "an entire tree shape can be created in a manner of minutes, just by adjusting numerical values and tweaking spline curve handles". Instead of Morrowind's artificially smoothed-over terrain, erosion algorithms incorporated in the landscape generation tools allowed for the creation of "craggy mountain vistas" quickly and easily.

=== PlayStation 3 ===
The PS3 release featured a number of technical improvements over the Xbox 360 release; load times were reduced, fewer framerate drops were experienced, and several bugs were fixed. Draw distance was increased, and new shaders were included to render the foreground cleanly and sharply, leading to rocky landscapes with "craggy appearances" rather than "smooth, non-distinct surfaces". The new shader sets blended "near detail" and "far detail" onscreen, removing the harsh line that cut between them in previous releases. Bethesda decided against implementing SIXAXIS motion support for the game, considering Oblivion not to be of a type well-suited to such a feature. The Knights of the Nine content pack was included with the game, but other downloadable content releases were not. The latter release spawned a host of rumors across the Internet: a 1UP piece said the content was removed due to its negative effect on console performance, and other websites repeated the claim. Limitations of the PS3's system memory were suspected as the potential cause of the performance drop.

In an article for IGN, Pete Hines challenged the statements, providing an alternate rationale for the content packages' absence. Firstly, he stated, the expansions were removed to avoid giving a PS3 player an early advantage over other consoles' players. Secondly, he said, the game designers were unfamiliar with the PlayStation Network Store and Sony's online content distribution systems, and had not yet determined the best method of releasing the packages. The suggestion that the PS3's technical makeup determined the move could not be "farther from the truth". Hines confirmed that the shader improvements for the PS3 would eventually migrate to the PC and Xbox 360 through further patches, but he noted that some optimizations would remain exclusive to the PS3. In the end, the Xbox 360 and the PS3 would be "very much on a par" in their graphical performance.

== Downloadable content ==
=== Background and horse armor ===
The content of the horse armor package was generally seen as meager, inspiring some to complain about its US$2.50 price.

From April 2006 onwards, Bethesda began releasing small DLC packages for Oblivion through their website and Xbox Live Marketplace, typically priced between one and three US dollars. The first of these packages, a set of horse armor, was released on April 3, 2006, for 200 Marketplace points (approximately US$2.50), or £1.50 for Xbox 360 users. For PC, it was priced at US$1.99.

Although Bethesda had not explained the price disparity, the horse armor was a notable addition to the early days of Xbox 360's downloadable content. Although other publishers had released paid content for games around the same time, the release of horse armor was somewhat controversial. Many players criticized the DLC as being too expensive for a cosmetic item that provided no functional benefit, which led to significant negative reactions in the media. Despite the complaints, Bethesda argued that DLC was an experiment with offering additional content for purchase, and they emphasized that it provided extra value for players.

At the time of its release, Oblivion already had some downloadable content such as dashboard themes and picture packs, which had been available since February 2006. Bethesda had also previously expressed interest in supporting the Xbox 360 release with additional downloadable content, and other companies had started releasing similar content at comparable prices. However, while Oblivion was one of the first to implement this type of in-game content, the initial push for downloadable content was seen as a new direction in gaming that many publishers, including Bethesda, were exploring.

In 2009, Bethesda ranked the 10 DLCs by sales numbers. The horse armor DLC came in at nine, having sold more than the Fighter’s Stronghold, which was initially released for free. Despite being mocked, it became an influential piece of content that contributed to the wider rise of microtransactions in gaming. It is now considered a pioneering example in the development of the gaming microtransaction industry.

=== Later releases ===
April 4 also saw the announcement of two new downloadable content packs for the coming weeks: a quest that would see players set out to repair a Dwarven Orrery; and a "Wizard's Tower" that would offer a new home for player characters, complete with the capacity to grow herbs, summon atronachs, and make spells. 1UP predicted that, given Bethesda's response to customer criticism, those releases would be somewhat more substantial than the "Horse Armor" release was. On April 7, Bethesda priced the "Orrery". Offering what GameSpot called "more bang for less buck", Bethesda set the PC release price at US$1.89, and the Xbox 360 release price at 150 Marketplace points, equivalent to US$1.88. Joystiq shared their approval for the new price, saying, "Although we passed on the $2.50 horse armor this week, we'll definitely be messin' with that Orrery device when it hits the Marketplace." The pack was eventually released on April 17. Also on April 7, EB Games and GameStop began offering a coupon promising one free download of the "Horse Armor" pack with every purchase of the PC edition of Oblivion. The "Wizard's Tower", called the "Frostcrag Spire" in-game, was released on April 24 for the same price as the "Orrery".

New releases continued into late 2006. The "Thieves' Den", a 2.27MB download offering the chance to "Uncover a famous pirate's lost ship and claim it for your own", was released on May 22 for the Xbox 360, priced at 150 Marketplace points, "roughly" equivalent to US$1.89. Explaining the add-on, Ashley Cheng stated "Basically, it's Goonies." "Mehrunes' Razor", a quest revolving around a mage in search of the deadly Daedric artifact known as Mehrunes' Razor, was released on June 14. It became the most expensive download yet, at US$2.99 for PC users and 250 Marketplace points, equivalent to US$3.13, for Xbox 360 owners. One 1UP.com reporter took the occasion to reflect on the increasing price of owning the "complete" Oblivion. With all the add-ons included, he calculated, "That's over $80 in game for the complete version of Oblivion, thus far." Foreseeing future problems with the upcoming PS3 release, and a potential bundling of all the software for a lower price, he wondered: "will Xbox 360 and PC users feel slighted? ... Microtransactions are sticky business." Joystiq continued to comment on the "Horse Armor" add-on in their notice of the quest's release. "With a weapon like that, who needs horse armor?" On July 13, "The Vile Lair", sporting a hidden crypt called "Deepscorn Hollow" for players bitten with Oblivion's vampirism bug, was released. Like "Orrery" and "Wizard's Tower", Bethesda set "The Vile Lair"'s PC release price at US$1.89, and the Xbox 360 release price at 150 Marketplace points, equivalent to US$1.88. Joystiq responded positively to the new price point. "What a bargain! ... It's good to see the folks at Oblivion have learned their lesson and aren't offering relatively super expensive content not fit to see the light of day."

On August 31, "Spell Tomes", adding books with "wondrous and powerful magic spells", to the random loot of fallen foes, was released, for the price of US$1.00 on both the Xbox 360 and the PC. Beginning on December 22 and continuing on until the end of the year, Bethesda offered their "Mehrunes Razor" package free of charge, as a sort of holiday gift. Oblivion's final content pack, named "Fighter's Stronghold", was released October 15, 2007. It was free to download in the first week after its release.
