= Starfield: Shattered Space =

2024 video game expansion pack

- Developer: Bethesda Game Studios
- Publisher: Bethesda Softworks
- Engine: Creation Engine 2
- Platforms: Windows; Xbox Series X/S; PlayStation 5
- Release: September 30, 2024: Windows, Xbox Series X/S September 30, 2024; PlayStation 5 April 7, 2026
- Genre: Action role-playing
- Mode: Single-player

Starfield: Shattered Space is the first major expansion pack for the action role-playing video game Starfield, developed by Bethesda Game Studios and published by Bethesda Softworks. The expansion was announced during the Starfield Direct event on June 11, 2023.

Shattered Space was released on September 30, 2024, for Windows and Xbox Series X/S to mixed critical reviews and negative user reception. It was released on PlayStation 5 simultaneously with the base game on April 7, 2026.

== Gameplay ==
The gameplay of Starfield is expanded in Shattered Space, with players facing new factions, creatures, and bosses. They gain access to new weapons, armor, and equipment, as well as crafting and research materials. Shattered Space expands upon the base game's exploration mechanics, adding star systems, planets, and points of interest, each with new environments, and challenges. Players engage in space combat, ground exploration, and dialogue-driven quests.

Starfield: Shattered Space is principally set on a single planet, contrasting with the base game Starfield, which features multiple planets and star systems. This design choice allows for a more focused and detailed exploration experience. The expansion emphasizes a dense and intricate environment. The design includes detailed interiors and diverse terrains, maintaining elements seen in Bethesda's previous games while integrating new features specific to the expansion.

== Plot ==
In Shattered Space, the player encounters a mysterious space station called The Oracle transmitting a distress call. Boarding The Oracle, they find much of the space station bathed in a strange blue liquid and encounter several strange and aggressive "phantoms". Fighting their way through, the player eventually restores power to the station, which Grav Jumps to Var'uun'kai, the homeworld of House Va'ruun. The capital city of Dazra has been afflicted by a massive explosion centered on the capital building that destroyed much of the city and killed countless citizens.

Although initially greeted with mistrust by the natives, when it is revealed that Anasko Va'ruun–the Speaker of House Va'ruun–has become a phantom, and that only the player can hear what he is saying, the player is inducted into House Va'ruun and tasked with finding a way to save Anasko. Working alongside the three noble Houses of House Ka'dic, House Veth'aal, and House Dul'khef, the player investigates the cause of the explosion while seeking to unite the Houses in an endeavour to breach the gravitational barrier that surrounds the Scaled Citadel. The player also investigates an anomalous cave that is infested with phantoms in the hopes of contacting Anasko Va'ruun. Successful, the player agrees to meet with Anasko in the Scaled Citadel in order to shutdown the experiment that is keeping the barrier up and causing the phantoms to appear.

After uniting the noble Houses and using their technology to breach the barrier, the player enters the Scaled Citadel and works with Anasko the restore power to the experiment so that they might complete it. Upon restoring power, Anasko commands the player to execute the original goal of the experiment, which would allow phantom-powered soldiers of House Va'ruun to resume an ancient holy war against the other factions in the Settled Systems. The player can choose whether to follow his command or deactivate the power safely, killing the phantom soldiers. Regardless of choice, the player ends up fighting Anasko and his phantom soldiers in order to destroy the experiment completely.

The player succeeds in their mission, banishing Anasko and his army from the galaxy. The player is then urged by the remaining leaders of the noble Houses to appoint a new Speaker, and cast the deciding vote on whether to resume their holy war or not.

== Development ==
Development of Shattered Space began shortly after the release of Starfield. The expansion was announced on June 11, 2023, and released on September 30, 2024. Creative director Todd Howard stated that the studio plans to release a story expansion pack for Starfield every year.

Developed by Bethesda Game Studios using the Creation Engine 2, the expansion focuses on enhancing the core gameplay experience while maintaining consistency with the base game's aesthetic and mechanics. Significant effort was put into designing the car mech system to ensure it integrated well with existing gameplay elements.

Design director Emil Pagliarulo gave an interview to GamesRadar+ promising that "this is a DLC dedicated to bespoke goodness" in reference to hand-crafted environments over the base game's procedurally generated content. Pagliarulo also went into detail about the design of House Va'ruun, saying that internally House Va'ruun content was developed in parallel with the two factions from the base game "but didn't really deep dive into the specifics" saving that for Shattered Space. Pagliarulo also said that House Va'ruun and their home-world were designed to be "alien", "weird", "truly unique", "kind of Klingon", and "2/3 Cthulhu cult" when compared to the base factions.

== Reception ==
Reception

Aggregate scores
Aggregator	Score
Metacritic	(PC) 63/100 (XSXS) 57/100
OpenCritic	31%

Review scores
Publication	Score
Eurogamer	3/5
GamesRadar+	3/5
IGN	7/10
PC Gamer (US)	60/100
The Guardian	2/5

Starfield: Shattered Space received "mixed or average" reviews from critics, according to review aggregator Metacritic, and 31% of critics recommended the game, according to OpenCritic. It received mostly negative user reviews on Steam, becoming one of Bethesda's lowest rated properties and their lowest rated DLC.
