= The Elder Scrolls VI: Sentinel =

Upcoming video game

- Developer: Bethesda Game Studios
- Publisher: Bethesda Softworks
- Producer: Todd Howard
- Series: The Elder Scrolls
- Engine: Creation Engine 3
- Platforms: Windows; Xbox
- Genre: Action role-playing
- Mode: Single-player

The Elder Scrolls VI: Sentinel is an upcoming action role-playing video game developed by Bethesda Game Studios and published by Bethesda Softworks. It will be the sixth main installment in the Elder Scrolls series, following 2011's The Elder Scrolls V: Skyrim.

The project is led by game director Todd Howard, reprising his duties from previous games in the series, as well as other games developed by Bethesda Game Studios. The Elder Scrolls VI is using the new Creation Engine 3. The game entered pre-production by 2018, formally being announced during Bethesda's E3 2018 conference. The game entered active production in 2023 following Starfield's launch.

== Development ==
=== Background ===
In June 2016, Todd Howard, director and executive producer at Bethesda Game Studios, confirmed the developer's intention to make a new installment in The Elder Scrolls series, while cautioning that it remained a long way from release.

According to former Bethesda designer Kurt Kuhlmann, The Elder Scrolls VI had originally been expected to follow Fallout 4 (2015), but the studio instead developed Fallout 76 (2018) and Starfield (2023). Kuhlmann attributed the decision to Howard and said that Starfield's lengthy development contributed to the extended interval between Elder Scrolls installments.

In October 2018, ZeniMax Online Studios producer Matt Firor said that The Elder Scrolls VI remained a long way off and would follow Starfield in Bethesda Game Studios' release schedule. Bethesda Softworks' Pete Hines reiterated in May 2020 that the game was still years away and that further information would not be provided until after Starfield.

In March 2019, Bethesda announced that YouTuber Shirley Curry ("Skyrim Grandma") would appear as a non-player character in The Elder Scrolls VI, following a fan petition advocating her inclusion.

Following Microsoft's acquisition of ZeniMax Media in March 2021, Bethesda Game Studios became part of Xbox Game Studios. Xbox CEO Phil Spencer subsequently indicated that most future Bethesda titles would be released on platforms supporting Xbox Game Pass.

In 2021, Howard said that The Elder Scrolls VI was in the design phase and that its technology would build upon work undertaken for Starfield, the first Bethesda Game Studios title developed using Creation Engine 2. He anticipated that the game could arrive approximately fifteen to seventeen years after Skyrim.

=== Production ===
In August 2023, Todd Howard described his intent behind The Elder Scrolls VI as wanting to make "the ultimate fantasy-world simulator", and that there were many directions to take with that goal due to the time passed since Skyrim's release. The game entered active production later that month following the completion of Starfield's development.

On March 25, 2024, Bethesda Game Studios celebrated the 30th anniversary of The Elder Scrolls, stating that The Elder Scrolls VI was still in development and early builds were already being played.

On December 19, 2025, in a video by Any Austin, Todd Howard confirmed that there would be more trees in The Elder Scrolls VI: Sentinel than there were in Skyrim.

On February 18, 2026, Todd Howard stated in an interview with Kinda Funny Games that The Elder Scrolls VI is being developed as a "classic Bethesda" role-playing game, comparable to The Elder Scrolls IV: Oblivion and The Elder Scrolls V: Skyrim. He confirmed that the game runs on Creation Engine 3 and that development had passed a major internal milestone, although no release window was announced.

In July 2026, IGN reported that more than 50 employees at Bethesda Game Studios had been laid off as part of Microsoft's restructuring of its Xbox division. Current and former employees expressed concerns that the layoffs could negatively affect development through delays, increased crunch, declining morale, and the loss of experienced developers.

== Release ==
The game was formally announced during Bethesda's conference at the Electronic Entertainment Expo 2018 event on June 10 that year, where Todd Howard presented a short teaser trailer, and revealed that the project had started pre-production, with its launch scheduled to follow the releases of the studio's imminent games in development, Fallout 76 (2018) and Starfield (2023).

In September 2020, Microsoft entered an agreement to acquire Bethesda Softworks' parent company, ZeniMax Media for US$7.5 billion, thereby receiving ownership of its various development teams and franchises, including Bethesda Game Studios and The Elder Scrolls, as part of Microsoft Gaming. Upon completion of the acquisition, former Xbox CEO Phil Spencer stated that making future Bethesda games exclusive to their platforms was intended to signify his commitment to bringing "the full complete package of what we have", a sentiment he shared for other franchises under the Xbox umbrella; he also said that the game would launch after the upcoming Fable game from Playground Games, which is currently scheduled for 2027. Prior to Microsoft's acquisition of ZeniMax Media, the game was initially targeting a launch date during the 2024 fiscal year period.

In June 2023, Phil Spencer provided an update on the game's release timing at a Federal Trade Commission (FTC) hearing concerning Microsoft's acquisition of Activision-Blizzard, stating that the title was still estimated to be "five plus years away" from launch, and that any target platforms were undecided at that particular stage. Leaked internal documents submitted to the FTC from the trial period revealed the game was anticipated to launch in 2026 at the earliest for Windows and as an Xbox console exclusive. (Note: Due to the prolonged release, IGN said in 2023 that "According to the leak, this mysterious next generation of Xbox is tentatively planned to hit shelves in 2028. With The Elder Scrolls 6 said to be at least five years away, there's a good chance Bethesda will launch the sequel on this new Xbox platform.") During a July 2026 Q&A session at Bloomberg News, journalist Jason Schreier stated that The Elder Scrolls VI was still estimated to be at least two years away from release, suggesting a launch no earlier than 2028.

On October 29, 2026, The Verge reported that The Elder Scrolls VI would be unveiled with the subtitle Sentinel in November. According to writer Tom Warren, the game will be set in the Hammerfell region, of which Sentinel is a major kingdom, with its main storyline focusing on the history of the Elder Scrolls themselves. On November 3, 2026, during a video celebrating the 40th anniversary of Bethesda, Todd Howard revealed that the official title of the game would be The Elder Scrolls VI: Sentinel.
