= Creation Engine =

Video game engine

- Screenshot from The Elder Scrolls V: Skyrim: player character using fire magic against giant enemy spiders
- Developer: Bethesda Game Studios
- Release: November 2011; 15 years ago
- Written in: C++
- Middleware: Scaleform, Havok Behavior, Radiant AI, Radiant Story
- Platform: Windows; Nintendo Switch; Nintendo Switch 2; PlayStation 3; PlayStation 4; PlayStation 5; Xbox 360; Xbox One; Xbox Series X/S
- License: Proprietary

Creation Engine is a 3D video game engine created by Bethesda Game Studios based on the Gamebryo engine. The Creation Engine has been used to create role-playing video games such as The Elder Scrolls V: Skyrim, Fallout 4, and Fallout 76. A new iteration of the engine, Creation Engine 2, was used to create Starfield. A third iteration of the engine, Creation Engine 3, is currently in development for the production of The Elder Scrolls VI: Sentinel and Fallout 5. The Creation Engine has been tailor-made for large-scale open-world RPGs.

== Development ==
After using the Gamebryo engine to create The Elder Scrolls III: Morrowind, The Elder Scrolls IV: Oblivion, and Fallout 3, Bethesda decided that Gamebryo's capabilities were becoming too outdated and began work on the Creation Engine for their next game, The Elder Scrolls V: Skyrim, by forking the codebase used for Fallout 3.

Following the completion of Skyrim, Bethesda set out to enhance the graphical core of the Creation Engine by first adding a physically based deferred renderer to allow for more dynamic lighting and to paint materials object surfaces with realistic materials. Bethesda worked with technology company Nvidia to implement volumetric lighting through a technique that makes use of hardware tesselation. Additionally, the updated version of the Creation Engine powering Bethesda's Fallout 4 offers more advanced character generation.

Bethesda Game Studios Austin (at the time BattleCry Studios) was tasked with modifying the Creation Engine to support multiplayer content in preparation for the development of Fallout 76 shortly before the release of Fallout 4, while Bethesda Game Studios began development of Starfield and downloadable content for Fallout 4. In conjunction with id Software, another ZeniMax subsidiary, BattleCry attempted to integrate id's Quake netcode into Fallout 4's engine. This was considered a challenge by experts in the online game industry. A primary issue facing the developers was that components of the core engine (dating back to Gamebryo used in The Elder Scrolls III: Morrowind) such as quests or world loading were designed centering on a single player (dubbed "Atlas" by the developers for its role in holding up the fabric of the loaded game world), a paradigm that would need to fundamentally change to allow multiple players spanning multiple worlds.

In addition to the network changes to the engine used in Fallout 4, the Fallout 76 implementation of the engine was described at the game's E3 reveal as having "all new rendering, lighting, and landscape technology". Bethesda Game Studios claims the improvements also allow for a 16× increase in detail and the ability to view unique weather systems occurring at a distance.

=== Creation Engine 2 ===
In November 2020 at the Develop: Brighton online conference, Todd Howard confirmed that the studio was rebuilding the Creation Engine for their next-generation games. Bethesda revealed in June 2021 that they were working on a new iteration of the engine called Creation Engine 2, and that it would power their upcoming games Starfield and The Elder Scrolls VI. Creation Engine 2 is Bethesda's largest overhaul to the engine since The Elder Scrolls IV: Oblivion and features real-time global illumination and advanced volumetric lighting. Creation Engine 2 also features improved post-processing effects, upgrades to animation and physics, and will serve as a technological baseline for future games.

=== Creation Engine 3 ===
On February 18, 2026, Todd Howard revealed that The Elder Scrolls VI was now poised to be powered by the newer Creation Engine 3. On March 17, 2026, Howard said that Creation Engine 3 allowed the team to make more stable builds that can be consistently tested, a critical part of the game's development. The studio spent several years upgrading to the new engine and is pleased with the technology behind Creation Engine 3. In July 2026, Bethesda Game Studios unveiled Creation Engine 3 and confirmed it would also be used to develop Fallout 5.

== Features ==
- Havok Behavior is a flexible animation tool that allows the developers to blend animations together in a few clicks. This means that animations such as walking and running can be blended together seamlessly to make the animations look much more realistic. This important addition enabled Bethesda to improve character animations in their games.
- An upgraded version of Radiant AI allows non-player characters (NPCs) to dynamically react and interact with the world around them. The player can observe an NPC eat breakfast, go to work, go to the pub, and then go to sleep. The improved AI allows NPCs to react to the player's actions and they can become friendly or hostile to the player because of their actions.
- Radiant Story allows for NPCs to dynamically create new quests for the player in unexplored places.
- In previous games, Bethesda licensed SpeedTree for trees and foliage, but when making Skyrim with Creation Engine, the Bethesda team made their own foliage rendering system. The new system is capable of rendering larger amounts of foliage at one time and allows for more freedom with animations.

=== Creation Kit ===
Creation Kit logo

The Creation Kit is a modding tool for Creation Engine games. The Creation Kit takes advantage of the Creation Engine's modular nature. It was created by Bethesda Game Studios for the modding community of The Elder Scrolls series. The tool can be used to create worlds, races, NPCs, weapons, update textures, and fix bugs. Mods created using this tool are hosted on the Steam Workshop, Nexus Mods, Bethesda.net and various other sites.

A Fallout 4–compatible Creation Kit was released in April 2016.

The Creation Kit is a new version of Bethesda's editor developed for Gamebryo, known as The Elder Scrolls Construction Set for The Elder Scrolls III: Morrowind and The Elder Scrolls IV: Oblivion, and as the Garden of Eden Creation Kit for Fallout 3 (referencing an in-game item of the same name).

A new Creation Kit with support for Starfield's Creation Engine 2 was released on June 9, 2024.

== Games using Creation Engine ==
Title	Release	Engine	Ref
The Elder Scrolls V: Skyrim	2011	Creation Engine	
The Elder Scrolls V: Skyrim – Special Edition	2016	Creation Engine	
The Elder Scrolls V: Skyrim VR	2017	Creation Engine	
The Elder Scrolls V: Skyrim – Anniversary Edition	2021	Creation Engine	
Fallout 4	2015	Creation Engine	
Fallout 4 VR	2017	Creation Engine	
Fallout 76	2018	Creation Engine	
Starfield	2023	Creation Engine 2	
The Elder Scrolls VI: Sentinel	TBA	Creation Engine 3	
Fallout 5	TBA	Creation Engine 3	
