= The Elder Scrolls: Blades =

2020 action role-playing video game

- Developer: Bethesda Game Studios
- Publisher: Bethesda Softworks
- Producers: Veronique Bruneau; Todd Howard
- Designer: Jonathan Cournoyer
- Writer: Emil Pagliarulo
- Composer: Inon Zur
- Series: The Elder Scrolls
- Platforms: Android, iOS, Nintendo Switch
- Release: Android, iOS; May 12, 2020; Nintendo Switch; May 14, 2020
- Genre: Action role-playing
- Modes: Single-player, multiplayer

The Elder Scrolls: Blades was a free-to-play action role-playing game developed by Bethesda Game Studios and published by Bethesda Softworks. It is a spin-off of The Elder Scrolls series, set following The Elder Scrolls IV: Oblivion and preceding The Elder Scrolls V: Skyrim. Following over a year of early access on Android and iOS devices, the full version of Blades was released for Android, iOS and Nintendo Switch in May 2020. The game received generally negative reviews from critics. The servers for the game shut down on June 30, 2026.

== Gameplay ==
The Elder Scrolls: Blades was an action role-playing game played from a first-person perspective. The game was designed specifically for mobile devices and features nearly-unavoidable one-on-one combat, which is engaged by tapping, swiping, or using virtual dual-stick controls via touch screen. Unlike the majority of the installments in the series, which are primarily built on open world and world map features, the game's overall design is linear, due to the challenges and limitations of mobile devices. Another distinction is that the abilities of sneaking around non-playable characters, moving corpses, and hiding/storing/stealing items were not included in the game. Combat includes using melee weapons, magic spells, and ranged attacks. Regarding the use of magic, the player can equip up to three different magic spells to use during combat. The game features dungeons that are both hand-crafted by designers and procedurally generated. Players can customize and level up their characters to enhance their abilities.

Blades featured three main game modes: Abyss, Arena, and Town. Abyss offers a roguelike experience in which the player must attempt to get as far as possible in an endless dungeon. Despite not being connected to the game's story, the endless dungeon is ideal to gain experience and strength for the player. Arena is a player versus player multiplayer mode in which two players battle against each other. Town is the game's main mode, which is a hub area where the player can receive quests and meet non-player characters (NPCs) to progress the story. The player's hub town initially starts destroyed and they are tasked with rebuilding and upgrading it, which consequently unlocks more quests and NPCs. Players can visit their friends' hub towns.

On mobile devices, the game could be played in either landscape or portrait mode.

== Synopsis ==
The story takes place within the fantasy universe of The Elder Scrolls, during the Fourth Era, and sometime after the Great War. The player's character is a surviving former member of the Blades, an elite legendary group of spies and bodyguards who long-served and protected the Empire of Tamriel for many generations. Despite their heroic and legendary feats, the Blades have been outlawed, disbanded, slaughtered, and forced into exile as result of the Great War. Being hunted down by the Thalmor Altmer, the player seeks refuge in their hometown, only to find it indirectly destroyed by a group of mercenaries who were hired by the Bloodfall Queen, Urzoga gra-Batul the Orsimer. Being sent by the Queen to collect taxes, one of the mercenaries destroyed a legendary Ayleid statue, which concealed a tunnel leading to a crypt under the town. Buried in the crypt was an Ayleid Sorcerer-King by the name of Celemaril Light-Bringer, a necromancer who once ruled the lands of Tamriel in the First Era. Being unleashed from the tomb, the now undead Sorcerer-King wreaked destruction on the town and caused the land to become ravaged by undead skeletons, spiders, skeevers (large, ratlike rodents), goblins, trolls, and wights. The player must brave through perilous dungeons, castles, ruins, caves, forts, and forests to rescue missing villagers, assist in rebuilding the town, seek out the mercenaries, and acquire more knowledge about the Sorcerer-King. The player must also seek out the Bloodfall Queen, reunite with their former mentor, Henrik Seven-Swords the Nord human, and be wary of the Thalmor agents.

Tracking down the Bloodfall Queen, the player learns that she is at odds with the Greencap Bandits.

== Development and release ==
The Elder Scrolls: Blades was developed by Bethesda Game Studios and published by Bethesda Softworks. The game was announced by Todd Howard during Bethesda's showcase at E3 2018 and was playable on the showfloor at the expo. Blades was released for Android and iOS devices as a free-to-play game on March 27 2019. Howard anticipated that Blades would be released on consoles and PC in the future, along with supporting virtual reality.

On March 1, 2019, Bethesda announced that they would be running an iOS-only closed beta for the game (with testers during that period kept under a non-disclosure agreement), prior to an early access release for both iOS and Android. On March 27, 2019, that early access process began, when the release date for the iOS App Store version was brought forward to the following day (March 28, 2019), to coincide with celebrations for the 25th anniversary of The Elder Scrolls series. The Android version of the app was also made available from Google Play on that same release date. The store entries for the game state that it "will launch as early access", and players "must receive an invite to play the game" during that time. Bethesda confirmed that they were emailing invites to players in "waves".

Following this invite-only period, on April 5, 2019, the early access version was made available to all players who are registered with Bethesda. The company stated on Twitter that "The gates to The Elder Scrolls: Blades are opening further. Excited to say that anyone with a Bethesda net account can now play." This message also included an acknowledgement of the feedback received from players to-date, and announcing forthcoming balance changes for the 'silver chest' in-game reward. This item had received negative responses from some players upon discovery that they required three real-time hours to open (without options available to open other chests in parallel or discard previous chests for a better one), thereby stalling gameplay. In response to players' complaints, Bethesda reduced the time to open Silver chests to an hour and reduced the cost of opening it instantly from 36 to 12 gems.

On May 2, 2019, the early access release was broadened further to include all iOS and Android players, when Bethesda updated the game to no longer require a Bethesda net account.

On May 17, 2019, further planned changes to the game were announced, including adjustments to equipment repair costs, and difficulty balance changes. During the same announcement, Bethesda also confirmed a forthcoming "big" update, which would include other player-requested features, such as jewelry and new story content. This version 1.1 update was released on June 9, 2019, also adding dialog for NPCs and support for player levels beyond 50.

On May 12, 2020, over a year since early access began, the game left early access as part of the version 1.7 update. This update also included a set of in-game rewards for players who had been part of the early access period. The Nintendo Switch version of the game was then released on May 14, 2020.

The servers for the game shut down on June 30, 2026.

== Reception ==
Reception

Aggregate scores
Aggregator	Score
Metacritic	(Switch) 42/100
OpenCritic	8% recommend

Review scores
Publication	Score
IGN	5.4/10 (early access)
Nintendo Life	3/10
Nintendo World Report	4/10

During its early access period, Blades received generally mixed reviews from critics. David Jagneaux from IGN heavily criticized the game for its long loading screens, grinding, lack of innovation, and its use of microtransactions; however, he praised the game for its visuals, character development, story, and combat.

The final release received negative reception, with the Nintendo Switch version receiving "generally unfavorable reviews" on the review aggregation website Metacritic. The Switch version of the game received the 10th worst aggregate score on the site out of all games released in 2020. Fellow review aggregator OpenCritic assessed that the game received weak approval, being recommended by 8% of critics. PJ O'Reilly of Nintendo Life called the game "a bland and repetitive grind", criticizing the game's design, gameplay, and technical performance. Matt Sainsbury of Digitally Downloaded panned the game, calling it "a creatively broken, anti-intellectual insult" and negatively comparing it to other The Elder Scrolls games. John Rairdin of Nintendo World Report wrote that the game was "a downright joke" and heavily criticized the combat and gameplay.

=== Sales and revenue ===
Blades was a commercial success. Within one week of the game's early access launch, it had exceeded 1 million downloads on the iOS platform, with the associated revenue reaching close to $500,000. 42% of these downloads were from users in the United States, with US players also accounting for 76% of the total spending during this time. Within the first month of early access release, the game had generated revenue exceeding $1.5 million on the iOS platform with player spending reaching close to $50,000 per day.

=== Awards ===
The game was nominated for "Mobile Game of the Year" at the Golden Joystick Awards, and won the award for "Song/Score - Mobile Video Game" at the Hollywood Music in Media Awards. It was also nominated for the A-Train Award for Best Mobile Game at the New York Game Awards, and for "Game of the Year" and "Best Audio/Visual Accomplishment" at the Pocket Gamer Mobile Games Awards.
