= Shirley Curry =

American YouTuber and gamer (born 1936)

- Born: April 2, 1936 (age 90)
- Occupations: Gamer; internet celebrity; YouTuber

YouTube information
- Channel: Shirley Curry
- Years active: 2015–present
- Genres: Entertainment; gaming; vlogs
- Subscribers: 1.30 million
- Views: 32.0 million
- Last updated: June 19, 2026

Shirley Curry (born April 2, 1936), also known by her nickname Skyrim Grandma, is an American YouTuber and gamer. She gained popularity for her Elder Scrolls V: Skyrim gameplay videos.

== Biography ==
Curry was born on April 2, 1936. She worked as a secretary in a candy factory, and for several years as an associate in a women's clothing department of Kmart before retiring at the age of 55 in 1991.

Curry got into video games after her son taught her how to play the 1996 turn-based strategy video game Civilization II. In 2011, she joined YouTube to follow gaming channels, and in 2015, she uploaded her first Skyrim gameplay video. By 2020, she had over 900,000 subscribers on YouTube. In 2022, Curry surpassed 1 million subscribers and was awarded a Gold Play Button by YouTube. After followers started a petition to include her in the following game of the series, the studio creator of the Elder Scrolls franchise, Bethesda Softworks, promised to include her as a character in The Elder Scrolls VI.

In 2022, Curry suffered a stroke while sleeping, forgetting many details of her experiences in gaming. Despite expressing frustration for its impact on her video game play, she began to recover from the stroke and expressed hope for the future. After the news broke, many of her fans united to wish her good health, and Bethesda Softworks sent her a bouquet of flowers.

On September 22, 2024, she published a video announcing her retirement from gaming videos, citing age, physical health challenges, and creation burnout as factors. Although she subsequently restarted Skyrim videos and also began playing Elder Scrolls IV: Oblivion Remastered, on September 29, 2025, Curry again announced a halt in her Skyrim uploads, citing boredom and not getting feedback from viewers.

== Personal life ==
Curry is a widow and has four children, nine grandchildren, and three great-grandchildren.

== See also ==
- GrammaCrackers
