= Philip Spencer =

Philip or Phil Spencer may refer to:

- Philip Spencer (sailor) (1823–1842), US Navy midshipman executed for mutiny without a court-martial
- Phil Spencer (television personality) (born 1969), British television presenter and journalist
- Phil Spencer (business executive) (born 1968), former head of Microsoft Gaming
- Philip Spencer (MP), Member of Parliament for Lincolnshire in 1397
- Philip Spencer (genocide scholar), British academic
- Philip Spencer, the pseudonym used by the witness of the Ilkley Moor UFO incident
