= GrammaCrackers =

American YouTuber

- Born: Sue Jacquot

Twitch information
- Channel: grammacrackers
- Genre: Gaming
- Game: Minecraft
- Followers: 3.7 thousand

YouTube information
- Channel: GrammaCrackers
- Genre: Gaming
- Subscribers: 1 million
- Views: 14,609,778
- Last updated: November 3, 2026

Sue Jacquot, better known online as GrammaCrackers, is an American YouTuber and Twitch streamer known for producing gaming content.

Jacquot was introduced to the game Minecraft by her grandsons, Austin and Jack, in Summer 2025. She initially began playing to spend more time with her grandchildren but quickly became a fan of the game. She spent entire nights playing the game, according to her, because she "didn't have a mum to tell [her] to go to bed". She uploaded her first YouTube video in October 2025 and it quickly gained over half a million views, which inspired her to create more content to raise money for her grandson Jack's cancer treatment. She began linking a GoFundMe campaign in the description of each video.

She was 81 years old when she began making content. She named the channel "GrammaCrackers" after Graham crackers, her favorite snack. She later began making videos of other games such as Fortnite, Roblox, and Rocket League. By January 2026, her channel had over 360,000 subscribers. Also by that time, the GoFundMe campaign had raised over $47,500, and the channel had raised almost $2,000 in advertising revenue.

On May 4, 2026, she began a livestream titled "Not Ending Until I Beat Minecraft". On the livestream's fifteenth consecutive day, somebody swatted her home in Queen Creek, Arizona, falsely reporting that she had been shot and killed by her grandson Jack. Police surrounded her home with riot gear and instructed everyone inside to exit with their hands up. Footage from the livestream showed police officers wake Jacquot up and escort her outside. Police stayed at the home for three hours before determining that the report was false. Jacquot resumed the livestream the next day. She later said that the swatting was "kinda fun".

== See also ==
- Shirley Curry
