= Philip Spencer (genocide scholar) =

Philip Spencer was the director of the Helen Bamber Centre for the Study of Rights, Conflict and Mass Violence at Kingston University, which he founded in 2004, and is now Emeritus Professor in Holocaust and Genocide Studies at Kingston University, Visiting Professor in Politics at Birkbeck, University of London, and a Senior Research Fellow at the London Centre for the Study of Contemporary Antisemitism. He is a genocide studies scholar, nationalism studies scholar and historian of modern Europe.

Spencer is a member of the advisory board of the UK Holocaust Memorial and Learning Centre. He is a founding member of the European Sociological Association Research Network for the Study of Racism and Antisemitism. He was a Trustee of the Wiener Library for the Study of the Holocaust and Genocide, and now sits on its advisory board, and is on the editorial board of the Journal of Contemporary Antisemitism.

His books include Genocide since 1945 (Routledge, 2012), which traces the history of genocide since the Holocaust looking at a number of cases across continents and decades, as well as works on antisemitism and nationalism.

== Selected works ==
- Spencer, Philip; Wollman, Howard (2002-04-25). Nationalism. London: SAGE. ISBN 978-1-84787-163-3.
- Spencer, Philip; Wollman, Howard (2005). Nations and Nationalism. Edinburgh: Edinburgh University Press. ISBN 978-1-4744-7277-7.
- Spencer, Philip (2012). Genocide since 1945. London: Routledge. ISBN 978-1-136-29368-9.
- Jikeli, Günther; Stoller, Kim Robin; Allouche-Benayoun, Joelle; Spencer, Philip (2013-05-16). Umstrittene Geschichte (in German). Weinheim: Campus Verlag. ISBN 978-3-593-42005-9.
- Karin Stoegner, Nicolas Bechter, Lesley Klaff, Philip Spencer (2015). "Contemporary antisemitism and racism in the shadow of the Holocaust, Academic Studies Press, [Boston]". WorldCat.org.
- Spencer, Philip (2013). "Imperialism, Anti-Imperialism and the Problem of Genocide, Past and Present". History. 98 (332): 606–622. doi:10.1111/1468-229X.12027. ISSN 0018-2648.
- Spencer, Philip (25 April 2014). "Another planet? Photographing conflict in eastern Congo". The Conversation. doi:10.64628/ab.ttcgfqw3d.
- Fine, Robert; Spencer, Philip (2015). Cosmopolitanism and Antisemitism. Bloomsbury Academic. ISBN 978-1-4725-8887-6.
- Fine, Robert; Spencer, Philip (28 February 2018). Antisemitism and the left: On the return of the Jewish question. Manchester University Press. doi:10.7765/9781526104960. ISBN 978-1-5261-0496-0.
- Spencer, Philip (13 April 2018). "Labour and anti-semitism: these are the roots of the problem on the left". The Conversation. doi:10.64628/ab.q3hf7sqkp.
- Spencer, Philip (2021). "Delphine Horvilleur, Anti-Semitism Revisited (MacLehose Press, 2021), Translated from the French Edition Réflexions sur la Question Antisémite (Editions Grasset, 2019), pp. 144, ISBN 978-1529404753". Society. 58 (2): 162–164. doi:10.1007/s12115-021-00587-7. ISSN 0147-2011.
- "The Problems of Genocide: Permanent Security and the Language of Transgression by Dirk Moses (review)". Antisemitism Studies. 8 (2): 352–375. 2024. doi:10.2979/ast.00031. ISSN 2474-1817.
- Spencer, Philip (2022). "Thinking about the Holocaust, Genocide and Antisemitism Today: On the Limitations of a New, Anti-Imperialist Revisionism". Society. 59 (1): 12–15. doi:10.1007/s12115-022-00668-1. ISSN 0147-2011.
- Rosenfeld, Alvin H.; Elman, Miriam F.; Gadó, János; Porat, Dina; Steinberg, Ger; Waltzer, Kenneth; Berkovitz, Balázs; Dayan, Daniel; Grabowski, Jan; Grimm, Marc; Harrison, Bernard; Ionescu, Dana; Klaff, Lesley; Maizels, Linda; Rich, Dave; Rossman-Benjamin, Tammi; Spencer, Philip; Steinberg, Gerald M.; Webman, Esther; Weitzman, Mark; Whine, Mike (2021). "Contending with Antisemitism in a Rapidly Changing Political Climate". WorldCat.org.
