= Starfield (video game) =

2023 video game

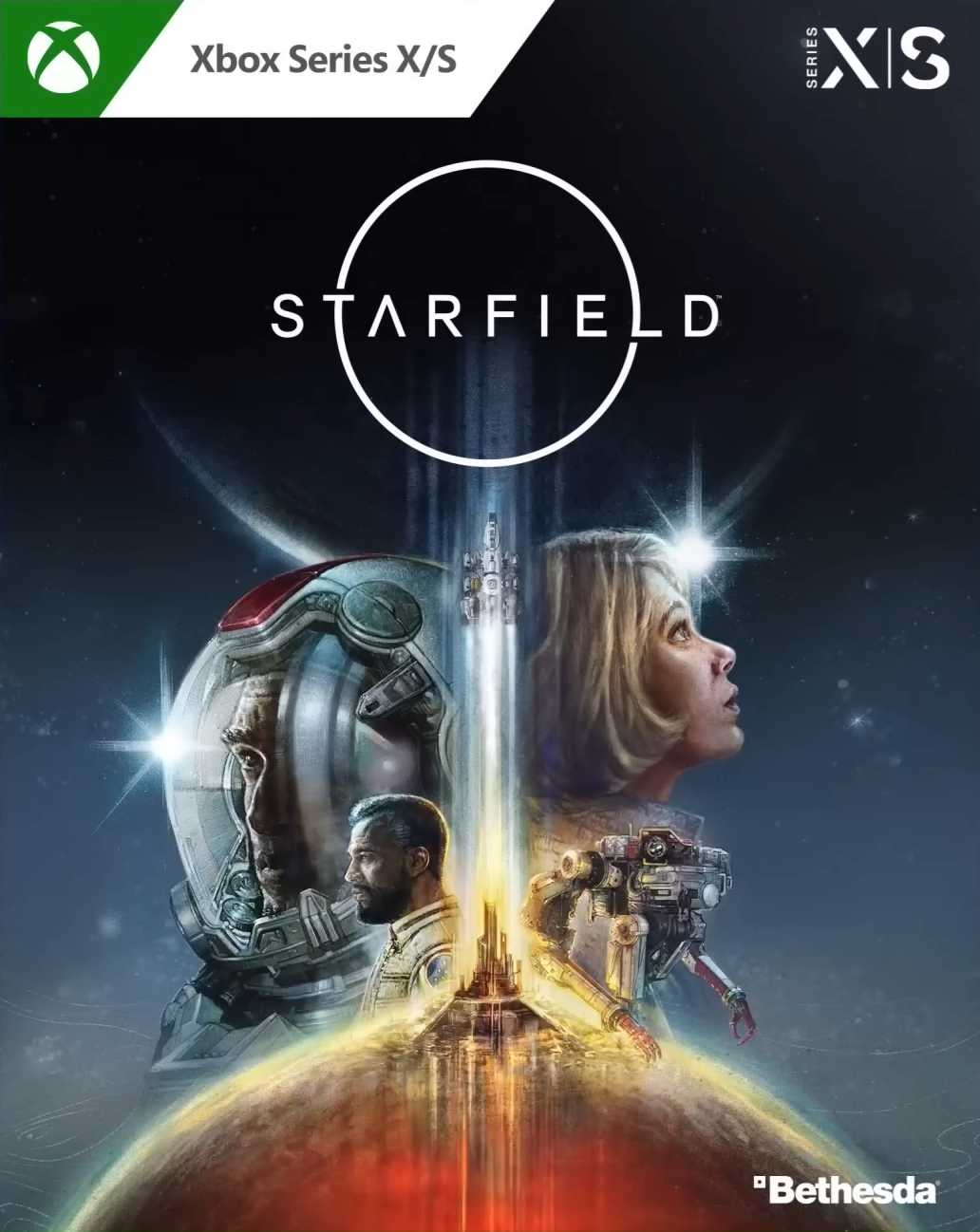
- Developer: Bethesda Game Studios (Note: id Software assisted with the game's graphics, visuals, and implementation of id Tech features.)
- Publisher: Bethesda Softworks
- Director: Todd Howard
- Producers: Angela Browder; Tim Lamb
- Designer: Emil Pagliarulo
- Programmer: Christopher Rodriguez
- Artist: Istvan Pely
- Writer: Emil Pagliarulo
- Composer: Inon Zur
- Engine: Creation Engine 2
- Platforms: Windows; Xbox Series X/S; PlayStation 5
- Release: September 6, 2023: Windows, Xbox Series X/S; September 6, 2023; PlayStation 5; April 7, 2026
- Genre: Action role-playing
- Mode: Single-player

Starfield is a 2023 action role-playing game developed by Bethesda Game Studios and published by Bethesda Softworks. In the game, the player character joins a group of space explorers who must venture 50 light-years around the Sol System to acquire mysterious artifacts. The game features an open world in the form of a volume within the Milky Way galaxy, containing both fictional and non-fictional planetary systems.

Starfield takes place in a space-themed setting, and is the first new intellectual property developed by Bethesda in 25 years. It was described by its director, Todd Howard, as "Skyrim in space". Like Bethesda's previous games, it was powered by the Creation Engine, though it was heavily modified to accommodate the game's procedural generation system. Active development of the game started following the release of Fallout 4 in 2015.

Announced in 2018, Starfield was delayed several times. The game was released for Microsoft Windows and Xbox Series X/S on September 6, 2023. A PlayStation 5 version was released on April 7, 2026. It received generally positive reviews from critics, with particular praise for its open world, setting, and soundtrack, though its story and exploration were divisive.

== Gameplay ==
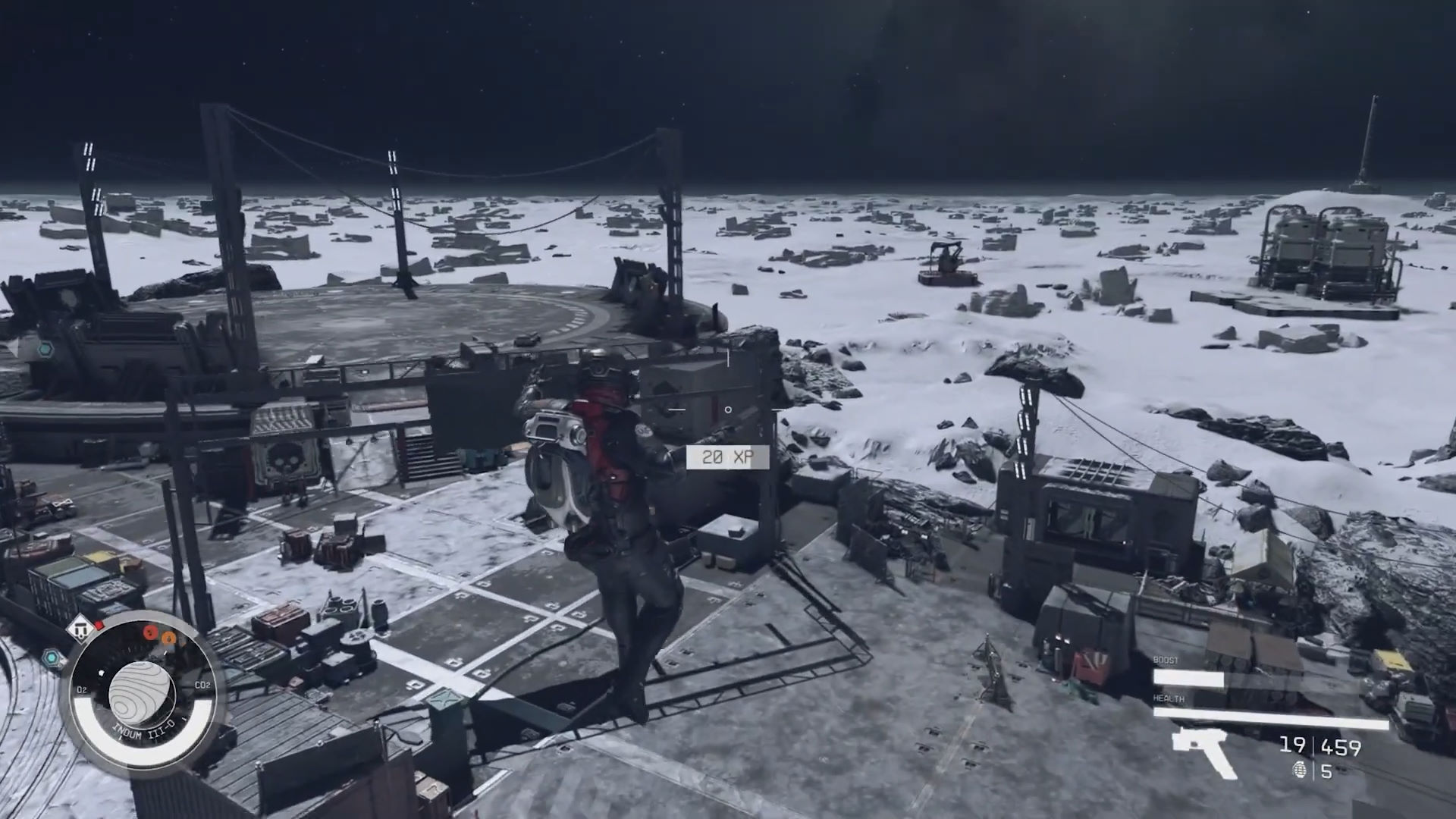
Player exploring an abandoned hangar. The planet's landscape and structures are procedurally generated.

Starfield is an action role-playing video game. The player can switch between a first-person and third-person perspective at any time. The game features an open world in the form of a volume within the Milky Way galaxy, containing both fictional and non-fictional planetary systems. The player is able to land on more than 1,000 planets and an unspecified number of moons and space stations. The majority of the landscapes within the game were procedurally generated, depending on the star of its system and its atmosphere, as well as locations of interest as the player approaches a planet, with modified and handcrafted content developed around them. The largest city in the game, New Atlantis, is the largest fictional city Bethesda has developed. As the player explores the game world, they encounter various non-playable characters (NPCs), some of whom have the option to join the player's crew. Such NPCs may aid the player in combat, carry items, speak to other NPCs on the player's behalf during confrontations, and comment on choices the player makes. The player may station crew members at any of their constructed outposts. Each companion character has their own unique skills and abilities. Some recruitable NPCs can be romanced by the player.

At the start of the game, the player can customize their character, a silent protagonist. This includes choosing their body type, appearance, facial features, background, and traits. Choosing the background of the player character unlocks three starting skills. As the player progresses, they will unlock additional traits which can aid or hinder them. For instance, the Introvert trait grants the player more endurance when travelling alone, but reduces their endurance when travelling with a companion. Traits are removable through quests or certain actions. As the player progresses, they gain experience and level up, allowing them to unlock abilities found in five distinct skill trees: Physical, Social, Combat, Science, and Tech. Each skill can be ranked up by completing related challenges.

A variety of firearms, explosives, and melee weapons can be used to defeat enemies. Most weapons are customizable via attachments. Equipping a telescopic sight enhances a weapon's accuracy while equipping a suppressor can engender a stealth-oriented playing style. Various items can aid the player in combat by restoring health or applying status effects. The player is additionally able to equip various jetpacks (called "boost packs"), which aid the player in both combat and traversing impassable or challenging environments. When landed on a celestial body, the gravitational force acting upon the player varies depending upon the body's mass and can affect combat, jump or boost height, as well as fall damage received. Certain items looted from structures or enemies are considered contraband and getting caught while smuggling them to other planets can get the player fined, jailed or attacked, such as a time-slowing drug Aurora, which is only legal in the city of Neon.

Prior to landing, the player can scan planets and asteroids to view their natural resources, such as iron or lithium. These must be extracted or harvested to fulfill many crafting recipes. Outposts can be erected by the player, which can serve as homes or facilitate resource-extraction operations. The player can install laboratories in their outposts to research craftable items and upgrades, which are sorted into five categories: Pharmacology, Food & Drink, Outpost Development, Equipment, and Weaponry. Workbenches are also used to craft specific items. Outposts can be constructed in either first-person perspective or isometric perspective.

The player can construct, purchase, or commandeer spaceships. At various spaceports located on planets or space stations, the player can buy and sell parts and spaceships, or have their own repaired. The game features a modular ship customization system, allowing the player to modify their ships' central components, facilities, rooms, paint color, decorations, and weapons. Larger spaceships may possess greater storage capacity and living space, but a lower maximum speed and shorter maximum Jump Range. Weapons must be equipped to defend the player's spaceship during ship combat. Ships feature a "power allocation" system, whereby the player must prioritize which systems receive levels of power at any given time. During combat, the player can opt to allocate power to weapons systems rather than their ship's "Grav Drive." Both hostile and peaceful NPC-piloted spaceships can be boarded. The player can plunder, commandeer and destroy ships, as well as speak to, trade with, and kill their occupants.

== Synopsis ==
=== Setting ===
Starfield takes place in the Settled Systems, a region of space extending outwards from the Sol System for approximately 115 light-years. Through the 21st and early 22nd centuries, exploration and colonization of the Solar System occurs at a gradual pace until the invention of the "Grav Drive" in the 2150s, which makes faster-than-light travel possible. Soon afterwards, Earth's magnetosphere begins to destabilize, gradually rendering the planet uninhabitable. Humanity is forced into a mass exodus from Earth to settle other star systems, starting with Alpha Centauri in 2156. The United Colonies is formed as the self-declared successor to the governments of Earth in 2159, based in the city of New Atlantis on Alpha Centauri's planet Jemison.

In 2189, the Freestar Collective breaks away from the United Colonies, intending to allow more autonomy and self-governance among its loose confederation of colonies. This new faction's capital is established in Akila City, on the planet Akila in the Cheyenne system. The two governments' opposing efforts for control of the Settled Systems eventually result in the Colony War from 2308 until a tense truce is declared in 2311. Other factions include: House Va'ruun, a reclusive and militaristic cult; the Ryujin Corporation, a near-omnipresent megacorporation that frequently utilizes corporate espionage; the Crimson Fleet, a tightly organized band of space pirates and smugglers; and Ecliptic, a shadowy order of technologically-advanced mercenaries.

The visual aesthetic of the Starfield universe, inspired by real-world technology such as that used by NASA, was dubbed "NASApunk" by director Todd Howard.

=== Plot ===
In the year 2330, the United Colonies and Freestar Collective enjoy an uneasy peace. The player assumes the role of a space miner working for the company Argos Extractors, who has been commissioned by the enigmatic Constellation—a famed group of galactic explorers—to locate an Artifact with strange gravitational effects buried underground. After extracting the Artifact, the player character experiences a vision propelling them through time and space. They awake to learn that their client is en route to collect the Artifact. Shortly after meeting the client and defending the mining operation from a Crimson Fleet attack, the player travels to New Atlantis, the capital of the United Colonies, to deliver the Artifact to Constellation's Lodge. From there, the player joins Constellation in their quest to locate more of the Artifacts, believing them to be one of the greatest mysteries left for humanity to uncover.

Over the course of their journey, the player has the opportunity to join various factions throughout the Settled Systems, including among others the UC Vanguard, a volunteer force dedicated to protecting United Colonies space, and the Freestar Rangers, who defend the people of the Freestar Collective above all else.

After meeting the remaining members of Constellation and collecting several more Artifacts, the player is directed to investigate an anomaly that corresponds with the presence of an Artifact, but is significantly stronger. There, they uncover an ancient temple and activate it, which gives the player the ability to use supernatural powers. The player then joins Constellation's benefactor and fellow member Walter Stroud in his efforts to obtain an Artifact from the pleasure city of Neon. After retrieving the Artifact, they are accosted by an unknown and unrecognizable entity calling itself "Starborn". The Starborn demands the Artifact, but Constellation are able to escape.

Constellation's mission to collect the Artifacts continues, spurred on by the competition they now face from the Starborn. In an effort to increase their scanning range to locate more Artifacts, the player is directed to help fix The Eye, Constellation's satellite in orbit. During this mission, the player receives word that Constellation's Lodge is under attack from a Starborn. The player can choose between defending The Eye or the Lodge. Depending on which location the player defends, one of Constellation's members dies in the attacks. Constellation surviving members escape with the Artifacts, much to the surprise of the attacking Starborn, "The Hunter", who allows the player to leave, promising that they will meet again.

Following a series of clues, Constellation track down the Hunter, who is meeting with another Starborn, called the Emissary, about the player's escape. Under a flag of truce, the player boards the Starborn ship and learns that the Starborn are not aliens, but humans from a parallel universe. The Emissary is a parallel version of the Constellation member who died in the Hunter's attack. The Emissary and the Hunter reveal that whoever is able to assemble all the Artifacts within a given universe will be able to reach "the Unity", the center of that universe and a gateway to further parallel universes. The Starborn have been competing for the Artifacts across countless parallel universes.

Excited at the possibility of exploring parallel universes, the members of Constellation become determined to retrieve the remaining Artifacts before the Starborn. The player travels to the ruins of Cape Canaveral, on Earth, to retrieve an Artifact. There, they learn about the Artifacts' role in the creation of the original Grav Drive, and how its development led to the destruction of Earth's magnetosphere. Shortly thereafter, the player is given a choice between aiding the Hunter, aiding the Emissary, or refusing to assist either of them.

Regardless of their choice, the player collects the remaining Artifacts not already held by the Starborn and confronts them at the buried temple. Emerging victorious, the player reaches the Unity and encounters a parallel version of themselves. This parallel version explains that by entering the Unity, the player will become Starborn, but that they will leave their native universe behind forever and enter another completely deprived of possessions or relationships, allowing the player to restart the storyline in a parallel universe.

=== New Game + ===
After entering the Unity for the first time, the player is provided the opportunity to either complete the main quest again (with minor differences in plot points and dialogue to account for their status as Starborn) or to skip it and focus on collecting the artifacts necessary to again enter the Unity. After entering the Unity a second time, the player might encounter one of several variable universes, featuring changes that can affect the main plot for that playthrough in myriad ways.

== Development ==
Starfield is the first new intellectual property (IP) by Bethesda Game Studios in over twenty-five years, and has been described by director Todd Howard as "Skyrim in space". The studio had been delving into space-themed games since as early as 1994, according to Howard. They had acquired the rights to make a game based on the Traveller role-playing system, but shortly lost them. Their Delta V game in 1994 had been part of this Traveller license but had not been fully realized. Howard stated they had rights to Star Trek in the 2000s and he pitched an idea for a role-playing game in that setting, but this failed to be approved.

While Bethesda had wanted to do a science fiction game for some time and had strong ideas for its gameplay style, it took a while to cement the ideas behind Starfield that would distinguish it from other science-fiction games already released. They came onto a theme which lead artist Istvan Pely dubbed "NASA punk", that although set in humanity's future, used technology that can be traced to origins in various National Aeronautics and Space Administration (NASA) space missions. Bethesda's team began writing a fictional narrative of events by decade of the approximately 300 years from development to the game's present, in order to ask "And now man is living amongst the stars: what does that mean?", according to Howard.

Starfield's concept had been in the studio's planned development plans for some time prior to the trademarking of the name in 2013. Of other potential names for the game, Howard said, "There were no other names. It had to be 'Starfield'." He said active development of the game had been ongoing since the release of Fallout 4 in November 2015. By mid-2018, the game was in production, had already been in development for some time and was in a playable state.

Starfield is the studio's first game made using Creation Engine 2.

== Marketing and release ==
At Bethesda's E3 2018 presentation, Todd Howard presented a short teaser trailer for the game. An in-engine trailer demonstrating the improvements of Creation Engine 2 was presented at E3 2021 during the combined Microsoft-Bethesda press event, and a release date of November 11, 2022, on Microsoft Windows and Xbox Series X/S as a console exclusive was announced. The London Symphony Orchestra previewed the game's title theme, "Starfield Suite" composed by Inon Zur, at The Elder Scrolls V: Skyrim - 10th Anniversary Concert in November 2021, while it was released as a standalone track on various streaming services in April 2022. In May 2022, Bethesda announced that the game's release would be delayed until the first half of 2023 alongside Redfall from sister studio Arkane Austin, with Howard stating that the additional development time and support from engineers at Microsoft would make Starfield a better game. On March 8, 2023, Bethesda announced that the game would be released on September 6, 2023. On June 11, 2023, Bethesda Game Studios presented approximately 45 minutes of gameplay for Starfield in a presentation called Starfield Direct immediately following that day's Xbox Games Showcase presentation. In July 2023, Bethesda released an anthology series of three animated shorts titled Starfield: The Settled Systems, which chronicle the daily lives of specific characters inhabiting three major cities in the galaxy: a delivery pilot based in New Atlantis, Jemison, an orphan in Akila City, Akila, and two young adults residing in Neon on the planet Volli Alpha. The game made a further appearance at Gamescom: Opening Night Live in August 2023, where a live-action commercial for the game and a live piano rendition of the game's main medley by Inon Zur were presented. Starfield was playable during the week of Gamescom, with Todd Howard and Xbox CEO Phil Spencer also holding an exclusive demo to the press, showcasing the first fifteen minutes of the game. On August 30, American band Imagine Dragons released a song titled "Children of the Sky" in promotion of the game. A music video was released September 19.

The standard edition of Starfield is available alongside a "Premium Edition", and another edition of the game titled "Constellation Edition". People who purchase either the Premium or the Constellation Edition received up to five days of early access prior to the game's official launch, while all owners secure free access to the first downloadable content expansion Shattered Space, as well as various bonus materials. A Premium Edition upgrade with the aforementioned perks is also available to owners of the standard edition on Xbox and PC, as well as Xbox Game Pass subscribers on console and Windows. Microsoft has distributed several accessories to commemorate the game, including a Starfield-themed Xbox Wireless Controller and headset, and a console decal wrap designed for Xbox Series X, which was released on October 18, 2023. In June 2023, Bethesda announced AMD as the exclusive PC partner for Starfield, who hosted a giveaway in August 2023 for 500 limited edition Ryzen 7 7800X3D CPUs and Radeon RX 7900 XTX graphics cards, styled after the aesthetics of the Constellation organization in the game. AMD is also distributing free codes for the game via Steam with the purchase of select products online.

On April 7, 2026, Bethesda Game Studios released a free update named "Free Lanes", which introduces a number of new features such as interplanetary travel, new dungeons and locations of interest. A paid story expansion titled Terran Armada, which sees players fighting against a new faction of robotic enemies, was released on the same day.

=== Windows version ===
On PC, Starfield is available through Steam and the Microsoft Store, with cross-progression between PC and Xbox supported on the Microsoft Store version. Due to the technical requirements of the game, without a powerful GPU, upscaling is important to achieve reasonable frame rates. Ahead of the game's release, Bethesda announced an exclusive PC partnership with AMD, causing concerns among gamers that the game would not support deep learning super sampling (DLSS) or XeSS, both considered superior to FidelityFX Super Resolution (FSR), and that the game may have performance issues. Starfield launched with AMD's FSR technology (version 2.2), without support for DLSS or XeSS. Starfield also supports AMD's Contrast Adaptive Sharpening (CAS), and Variable Rate Shading (VRS).

AMD gaming chief Frank Azor stated that there is nothing blocking Bethesda from adding DLSS to the game, and that if they want to add DLSS, "they have AMD's full support" and that when publishers ask for DLSS support, "we always tell them yes." Xbox Series X and S also support FSR but not DLSS, which is another reason to prioritize FSR over DLSS. Bethesda did not answer questions at the time about whether it will add DLSS.

Before the game's wide release on September 6, a mod was released by PureDark to add DLSS to Starfield. It became controversial with the creator adding a paywall via their Patreon and DRM for access to the version enabling DLSS 3. Subsequently, another mod released by user "LukeFZ" added DLSS 3 support for free.

The PC release also initially lacked other features considered standard for AAA PC games. The PC release does not support HDR, even though the Xbox release does. There were also no gamma or contrast controls, and there were no options to adjust field of view or anisotropic filtering. The game did not support Intel GPUs at launch (with support added later by graphics driver updates) and is also optimized much more efficiently for AMD GPUs than for Nvidia and Intel GPUs.

In November 2023, Starfield was updated with support for DLSS, a field of view slider, and many other quality-of-life features that were not originally present.

=== Xbox version ===
Starfield runs at 4K resolution on the Xbox Series X and 1440p on the Xbox Series S. Both versions use AMD FSR 2 upscaling; on the Series X the game runs at an internal resolution of 1440p, and on Series S the internal resolution is 900p.

Both Xbox versions could run the game with a framerate capped at 30 frames per second (FPS) at launch, with both Xbox Series X and Series S later receiving an optional 60 FPS mode. The rationale for the original frame cap was to provide consistency. Most areas of the game run at 30FPS; however, there are occasionally dips in the frame rate in some cities, causing stutters.

There is no native Xbox One version of the game; however, Xbox One owners can stream the game to their consoles with Xbox Cloud Gaming's "Ultimate" tier. As an Xbox Play Anywhere title, save data is preserved between the PC and Xbox versions.

=== Cloud gaming ===
Starfield is available on multiple cloud gaming services. Cloud gaming is notable for Starfield due to the game's extensive use of both CPU and GPU resources. The game is available on Microsoft's Xbox Cloud Gaming streaming service for Xbox Game Pass subscribers, which includes cross-progression with the Xbox and the Microsoft Store PC versions. Xbox Cloud Gaming also allows Xbox One users to play the game, as there is no native version for Xbox One. One week after launch, Starfield was added to GeForce Now, allowing players who already own the game on Steam to stream the game. GeForce Now runs the game on an Nvidia RTX 4080-equivalent GPU, providing performance improvements over many gamers' PCs in GeForce Now's "Ultimate" tier.

== Reception ==
=== Critical reception ===
Reception

Aggregate scores
Aggregator	Score
Metacritic	(PC) 85/100 (XSXS) 83/100
OpenCritic	83%

Review scores
Publication	Score
Destructoid	10/10
Digital Trends	3.5/5
Easy Allies	8/10
Eurogamer	3/5
Famitsu	34/40
Game Informer	8.5/10
GameSpot	7/10
GamesRadar+	5/5
Hardcore Gamer	4/5
IGN	7/10
PC Gamer (US)	75/100
PCGamesN	7/10
PCMag	3.5/5
RPGFan	98/100
Shacknews	9/10
TechRadar	4/5
The Guardian	4/5
Video Games Chronicle	5/5
VG247	4/5
VideoGamer.com	9/10
The Washington Post	4/4

Starfield received "generally favorable" reviews from critics, according to review aggregator website Metacritic. 83% of critics recommended the game on OpenCritic.

Leon Hurley from GamesRadar+ praised Starfield for its expansive and immersive world, its varied and creative missions, its solid and stable mechanics, and its graphics. Hurley also pointed out some minor flaws, such as the lack of stealth and pickpocketing skills at the start. Hurley said that Starfield is the best thing Bethesda has done since The Elder Scrolls IV: Oblivion, and that it offers endless discovery and opportunities for players who love exploration and freedom. Writing for The Washington Post, Gene Park said that Starfield is a massive undertaking by Bethesda that aims high and explores new territory. Several reviewers noted the relative lack of bugs at launch compared to previous Bethesda titles.

The game's story and characters divided critics. IGN praised the worldbuilding and number of interesting companion characters, also saying the sidequests were dynamic enough to give the player the opportunity to role-play. On the other hand, Digital Trends found the characters to be disappointingly one-note, though did praise the varied sidequests, while TechRadar said that the main story felt "soulless".

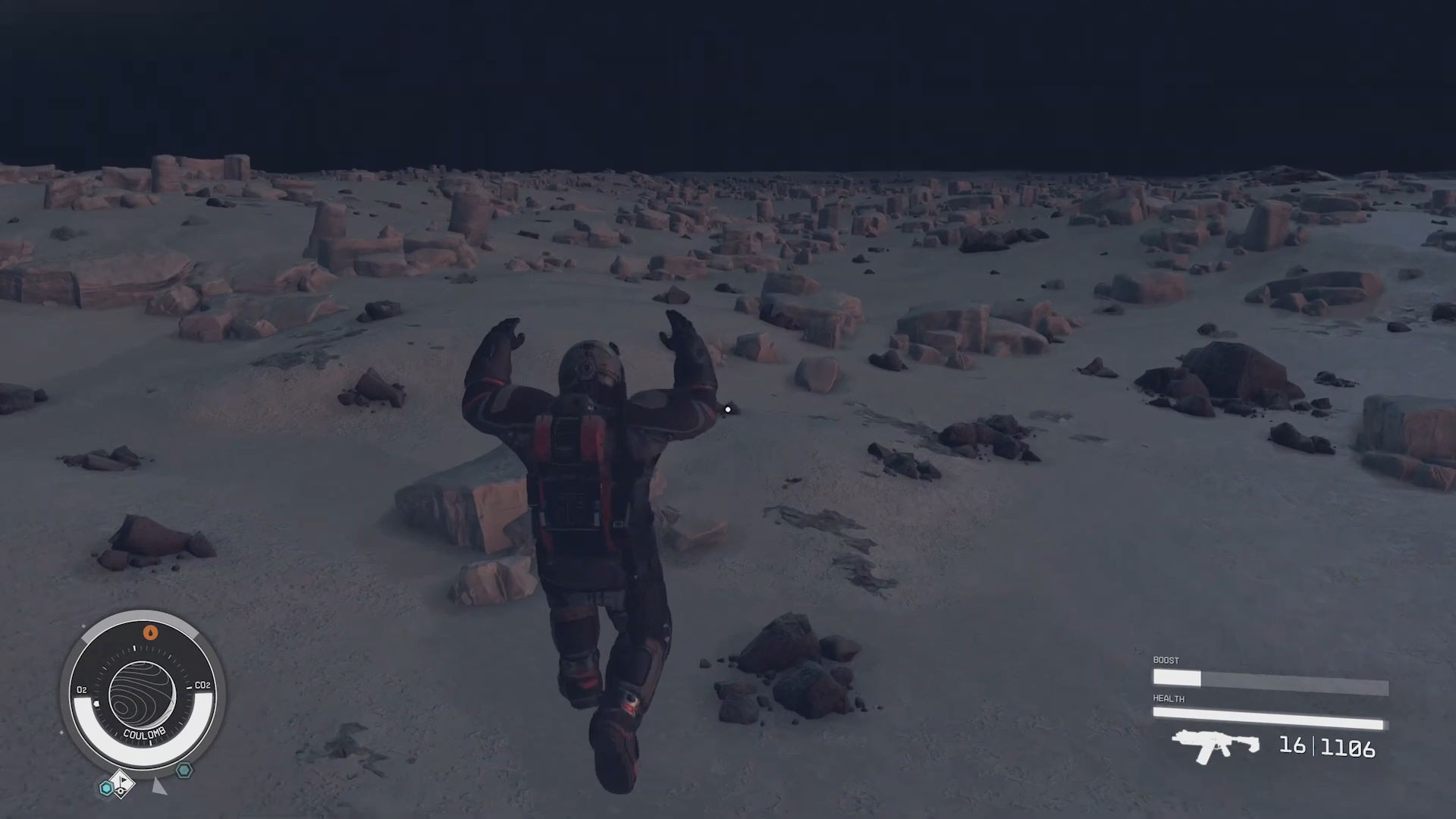
Planets in Starfield were called "empty" and "repetitive" by some sources.

The implementation of space exploration also drew mixed responses. PC Gamer said that the game "fails to feel like a grand adventure" and criticized space travel as being too reliant on loading screens and fast-travel between planets. Digital Trends was also disappointed by the lack of depth to space travel and noted the repetitive nature of the game's 1,000 planets. Destructoid was more positive about the exploration, commending the unpredictability of the sandbox and amount of content to discover.

The game's original score, composed by Inon Zur, was a consistent subject of praise. Destructoid praised the themes as fitting in with the space setting, while Shacknews called the score "phenomenal" and said "There were times I'd find myself sitting idle, just soaking in the environment and enjoying the original score."

=== Audience reception ===
As of January 2024, the Windows version of Starfield received a "mixed" rating from players on Steam. Shattered Space, Starfield's first DLC, has a "mostly negative" rating as of January 2025.

Players noted a number of bugs present in Starfield, with many frustrated with their variety, frequency and severity. This criticism was exacerbated by the speed with which private individuals managed to fix these bugs in third-party mods, with community manager Robert O'Neill commenting that the delays to patches were due to the "lengthy certification and localisation processes" they must go through before being implemented. Bethesda's head of global publishing Pete Hines defended the game, responding to the reaction from players by saying "[Bethesda] could make a safer, less buggy, less risky game if we wanted to. But what we try to lean into is player freedom."

Bethesda received some criticism due to their responses made on negative Steam reviews criticizing various aspects of the game, with some players describing Starfield as boring or generic and criticizing its frequent loading screens. IGN's Wesley Yin-Poole commented that it was "noteworthy", as "big publishers like Bethesda rarely get stuck in [reviews]", and speculated it was a response from Bethesda management due to Starfield being the lowest-rated Bethesda game ever on Valve's platform. In December 2023, Starfield's lead studio design director, Emil Pagliarulo, posted a thread on social media platform X in response to negative criticism aimed at game developers. He stated it was "funny how disconnected some players are from the realities of game development, and yet they speak with complete authority". He went on to emphasise that "nobody sets out to make a bad game" and that critical consumers shouldn't "fool [themselves] into thinking you know why it is the way it is". While Pagliarulo's statement did not refer to any specific game, writers for GamesRadar+ and PC Gamer speculated it was in response to Starfield's mixed reception.

Kurt Kuhlmann, who was the lead systems designer on Starfield, later stated that Bethesda did not fully realize the original "ambitious as hell vision" of the game. He argued that the game's main problem was that it "didn't fully cohere", as communication problems within the studios and a lack of experience with its new systems made its various parts feel disconnected. Opining that it needed substantially more developers and content to fully realize its original concept. At an interview, Todd Howard acknowledged criticisms that the game lacked "organic exploration", saying that "the way you explore in that game, given the nature of what it is, is just it’s tricky; it’s harder".

=== Sales ===
Starfield reached over 230,000 concurrent players in the first two hours of early access on Steam. On September 6, 2023, Phil Spencer announced that Starfield has become Xbox's most-played next-gen game ever, with one million concurrent players. It also became Xbox and Bethesda's most wishlisted Steam game in its history. On September 7, Bethesda announced that Starfield has over six million players, making it Bethesda's biggest launch. On September 10, Starfield reached its all-time peak for concurrent players with over 330,000 players, exceeding Elder Scrolls V: Skyrim. Starfield reached ten million players by September 19, over 13 million players by December 21, and over 15 million players by November 19, 2024. It was the 11th best-selling video game in the US in 2023. Four months post-launch, Starfield's player numbers on Steam had fallen lower than Bethesda Game Studios' previous works, The Elder Scrolls V: Skyrim Special Edition and Fallout 4, dropping to 11,182 by January 11, 2024.

=== Awards ===
Year	Ceremony	Category	Result	Ref.
2021	Golden Joystick Awards	Most Wanted Game	Nominated	
2022	Golden Joystick Awards	Most Wanted Game	Nominated	
2022	The Game Awards 2022	Most Anticipated Game	Nominated	
2023	Golden Joystick Awards	Ultimate Game of the Year	Nominated	
2023	Golden Joystick Awards	Best Supporting Performer (Cissy Jones)	Nominated	
2023	Golden Joystick Awards	Best Visual Design	Nominated	
2023	Golden Joystick Awards	Best Audio	Nominated	
2023	Golden Joystick Awards	Xbox Game of the Year	Won	
2023	Steam Awards	Most Innovative Gameplay	Won	
2023	The Game Awards 2023	Best Role Playing Game	Nominated	
2024	BMI Film & TV Awards	Video Game Award (Best Music)	Won	
2024	New York Game Awards	Big Apple Award for Game of the Year	Nominated	
2024	New York Game Awards	Herman Melville Award for Best Writing in a Game	Nominated	
2024	New York Game Awards	Statue of Liberty Award for Best World	Nominated	
2024	27th Annual D.I.C.E. Awards	Role-Playing Game of the Year	Nominated	
2024	27th Annual D.I.C.E. Awards	Outstanding Achievement in Art Direction	Nominated	
2024	24th Game Developers Choice Awards	Game of the Year	Honorable mention	
2024	24th Game Developers Choice Awards	Innovation Award	Honorable mention	
2024	24th Game Developers Choice Awards	Best Narrative	Honorable mention	
2024	24th Game Developers Choice Awards	Best Technology	Nominated	
2024	24th Game Developers Choice Awards	Audience Award	Nominated	
2024	20th British Academy Games Awards	Narrative	Longlisted	
2024	20th British Academy Games Awards	New Intellectual Property	Longlisted	
2024	20th British Academy Games Awards	Technical Achievement	Nominated	
