= Bethesda Game Studios =

American video game developer

- Type: Division
- Industry: Video games
- Founded: 2001; 25 years ago
- Headquarters: Rockville, Maryland, US
- Number of locations: 4
- Key people: Angela Browder (studio director); Ashley Cheng (managing director); Todd Howard (executive producer)
- Products: Creation Engine; The Elder Scrolls series (2002–present); Fallout series (2008–present); Starfield (2023)
- Number of employees: >500 (2026)
- Parent: Bethesda Softworks
- Website: bethesdagamestudios.com

Bethesda Game Studios is an American video game developer and a studio of ZeniMax Media based in Rockville, Maryland. It is best known for its action role-playing franchises, including The Elder Scrolls, Fallout, and Starfield. Bethesda Game Studios opened in 2001 as the development unit of Bethesda Softworks, separating from publishing operations. Todd Howard serves as the studio's executive producer, leading it with managing director Ashley Cheng and studio director Angela Browder. As of November 2023, Bethesda Game Studios had 450 employees.

== History ==
Bethesda Game Studios was established in 2001. Previously, Bethesda Softworks, then a developer and publisher, had been reorganized as a subsidiary of ZeniMax Media. ZeniMax's Robert A. Altman sought to grow the development unit, which was spun off from Bethesda Softworks as Bethesda Game Studios, starting out with roughly 40 people.

By 2008, Bethesda Game Studios was considered one of the most popular video game studios due to the success of The Elder Scrolls series and Fallout 3. In 2008, Gamasutra praised Bethesda, claiming that they “[spent] years to create massive, open-world, single-player RPGs — hardly a booming genre in the industry at large — to great success, bringing a once-niche PC genre to a broad multiplatform audience.”

In December 2015, Bethesda Game Studios opened a satellite studio in Montreal under the leadership of Yves Lachance, the former head of Behaviour Interactive. In 2018, two ZeniMaxi-owned studios became part of Bethesda Game Studios: BattleCry Studios was renamed Bethesda Game Studios Austin in March, and Escalation Studios was turned into Bethesda Game Studios Dallas in August. Microsoft acquired ZeniMax in March 2021.

=== Unions ===
All four studios of Bethesda Game Studios have union representation with Communications Workers of America which represent all employees in both the United States and Canada. These are the first "wall to wall" unions within a Microsoft bargaining unit.

241 US employees unionized as "OneBGS" on July 20, 2024. The bargaining unit includes employees at three studios in Austin, Dallas, Texas and Rockville, Maryland. The unit includes artists, developers, and engineers; unlike its parent company ZeniMax, which exclusively represents QA testers. The Montreal studio of Bethesda Game Studios was certified on August 13, 2024 with support of Communications Workers of America Canada.

== Satellite studios ==
=== Bethesda Game Studios Austin ===
ZeniMax Media announced the opening of BattleCry Studios in Austin, Texas, on October 3, 2012, with Rich Vogel as its president. The studio immediately began hiring developers with experience in microtransactions and free-to-play games, growing to roughly 35 employees by November 2013. It announced its first project, the multiplayer combat game BattleCry, in May 2014. However, the studio laid off a significant portion of its staff in September 2015, followed by the cancellation of BattleCry in October to focus on different projects. Among these projects, it was tasked with modifying Bethesda Game Studios's Creation Engine to support multiplayer functionality for Fallout 76, working with another sister studio, id Software, and repurposed some netcode from Quake. BattleCry Studios then assisted Bethesda Game Studios on the game itself and in August 2016 replaced Certain Affinity in assisting id Software to develop multiplayer components for Doom. Vogel left BattleCry Studios by September 2017 to join Certain Affinity. In March 2018, BattleCry Studios, now under studio director Doug Mellencamp, was integrated into Bethesda Game Studios and renamed Bethesda Game Studios Austin.

=== Bethesda Game Studios Dallas ===
Tom Mustaine, Marc Tardif, and Shawn Green founded Escalation Studios in 2007. Mustaine had previously co-founded Ritual Entertainment, while Tardif had been an executive producer and the senior vice president of business development at Gearbox Software. In January 2012, the social gaming company 6waves Lolapps (6L) announced its acquisition of the studio on undisclosed terms. Mustaine and Tardif became Escalation Studios's design directors, while Green acceded to 6L as its director of engineering. At the time, Escalation had around 30 employees. However, in March 2012, 6L announced it was laying off all of its development staff, keeping Escalation Studios active "in some capacity". The studio spun off from 6L by May 2012. ZeniMax Media then acquired it on February 1, 2017. In August 2018, it was integrated with Bethesda Game Studios and renamed Bethesda Game Studios Dallas. It immediately began assisting the studio on Starfield.

=== Bethesda Game Studios Montreal ===
Bethesda Game Studios announced the opening of a Montreal, Canada, office on December 9, 2015. At the time of the announcement, the studio employed 40 developers under studio director Yves Lachance. Bethesda Game Studios had previously worked with Lachance on several projects while he was at Behaviour Interactive, including Fallout Shelter, which Bethesda Game Studios Montreal immediately took over. In June 2024, the studio's developers announced their intent to unionize with support from the Canadian branch of the Communications Workers of America. Lachance left the studio in July to lead WB Games Montréal.

== Games developed ==
Bethesda Game Studios has principally been involved in the development of role-playing video games with its The Elder Scrolls and Fallout series for consoles and personal computers, most of which have been commercially and critically successful.

In 2015, the studio entered into the mobile gaming market with Fallout Shelter based on the same franchise, which gained 50 million players by mid-2016. In February 2017, Howard said that it is in development of another mobile title following onto the success of Fallout Shelter. This was revealed in 2018 to be The Elder Scrolls: Blades.

In 2016, Howard confirmed that while it is developing The Elder Scrolls VI, it was still a long way to the game's release. Meanwhile, two other significant projects are in development which are expected to be released prior to The Elder Scrolls VI. On May 30, 2018, Fallout 76 was announced. On June 10, 2018, during Bethesda's E3 2018 conference, the other project in development was revealed to be the company's first new intellectual property in 25 years, Starfield. During the 2021 Xbox/Bethesda Games Showcase, Starfield was announced to be releasing exclusively for PC and Xbox Series X/S. Starfield released on September 6, 2023. On June 14, 2022, Howard confirmed that Fallout 5 would start development after the completion of The Elder Scrolls VI, with the latter currently in the pre-production phase of development.

Year	Title	Platform(s)	Notes
2002	The Elder Scrolls III: Morrowind	Windows, Xbox	
2004	IHRA Professional Drag Racing 2005	PlayStation 2, Xbox	
2006	IHRA Drag Racing: Sportsman Edition	PlayStation 2, Windows, Xbox	
2006	The Elder Scrolls IV: Oblivion	PlayStation 3, Windows, Xbox 360	
2008	Fallout 3	PlayStation 3, Windows, Xbox 360	
2011	The Elder Scrolls V: Skyrim	PlayStation 3, Windows, Xbox 360	Developed on Creation Engine
2015	Fallout Shelter	Android, iOS, Nintendo Switch, PlayStation 4, Windows, Xbox One	Developed in collaboration with Behaviour Interactive.
2015	Fallout 4	PlayStation 4, Windows, Xbox One, PlayStation 5, Xbox Series X/S, Nintendo Switch 2	Additional work by Id Software.
2016	The Elder Scrolls V: Skyrim – Special Edition	PlayStation 4, Windows, Xbox One, Nintendo Switch, PlayStation 5, Xbox Series X/S, Nintendo Switch 2	Ported to Nintendo Switch by Iron Galaxy.
2017	The Elder Scrolls V: Skyrim VR	PlayStation 4, Windows	Developed in collaboration with Iron Galaxy.
2017	Fallout 4 VR	Windows	Developed in collaboration with Iron Galaxy.
2018	Fallout 76	PlayStation 4, Windows, Xbox One, PlayStation 5, Xbox Series X/S	
2020	The Elder Scrolls: Blades	Android, iOS, Nintendo Switch	
2023	Starfield	Windows, Xbox Series X/S, PlayStation 5	Additional work by Id Software. Developed using Creation Engine 2.
2024	The Elder Scrolls: Castles	Android, iOS	
2025	The Elder Scrolls IV: Oblivion Remastered	PlayStation 5, Windows, Xbox Series X/S, Nintendo Switch 2	Developed in collaboration with Virtuos.
TBA	Fallout 3 Remastered	TBA	Developed in collaboration with another studio.
TBA	Fallout: New Vegas Remastered	TBA	Developed in collaboration with another studio.
TBA	The Elder Scrolls VI: Sentinel	TBA	Full production stage. Developed using Creation Engine 3.
TBA	Fallout 5	TBA	Pre-production stage. Developed using Creation Engine 3.
TBA	Untitled Fallout game	TBA	Developed in collaboration with Obsidian Entertainment.

=== Expansion packs ===
Year	Title	Game	Platform(s)
2002	Tribunal	The Elder Scrolls III: Morrowind	Windows, Xbox
2003	Bloodmoon	The Elder Scrolls III: Morrowind	Windows, Xbox
2006	Knights of the Nine	The Elder Scrolls IV: Oblivion (Note: Also included as part of The Elder Scrolls IV: Oblivion Remastered for PlayStation 5, Windows, Xbox Series X/S and Nintendo Switch 2)	PlayStation 3, Windows, Xbox 360
2007	Shivering Isles	The Elder Scrolls IV: Oblivion	PlayStation 3, Windows, Xbox 360
2009	Operation: Anchorage	Fallout 3	PlayStation 3, Windows, Xbox 360
2009	The Pitt	Fallout 3	PlayStation 3, Windows, Xbox 360
2009	Broken Steel	Fallout 3	PlayStation 3, Windows, Xbox 360
2009	Point Lookout	Fallout 3	PlayStation 3, Windows, Xbox 360
2009	Mothership Zeta	Fallout 3	PlayStation 3, Windows, Xbox 360
2012	Dawnguard	The Elder Scrolls V: Skyrim (Note: Also included as part of the game's Special Edition and Anniversary Edition re-releases for PlayStation 4, Windows, Xbox One, Nintendo Switch, PlayStation 5, Xbox Series X/S and Nintendo Switch 2)	PlayStation 3, Windows, Xbox 360
2012	Hearthfire	The Elder Scrolls V: Skyrim	PlayStation 3, Windows, Xbox 360
2012	Dragonborn	The Elder Scrolls V: Skyrim	PlayStation 3, Windows, Xbox 360
2016	Automatron	Fallout 4 (Note: Also included as part of the game's Anniversary Edition re-release for PlayStation 4, PlayStation 5, Windows, Xbox One, Xbox Series X/S and Nintendo Switch 2)	PlayStation 4, Windows, Xbox One
2016	Wasteland Workshop	Fallout 4	PlayStation 4, Windows, Xbox One
2016	Far Harbor	Fallout 4	PlayStation 4, Windows, Xbox One
2016	Contraptions Workshop	Fallout 4	PlayStation 4, Windows, Xbox One
2016	Vault-Tec Workshop	Fallout 4	PlayStation 4, Windows, Xbox One
2016	Nuka-World	Fallout 4	PlayStation 4, Windows, Xbox One
2020	The Pitt	Fallout 76	PlayStation 4, Windows, Xbox One, PlayStation 5, Xbox Series X/S
2020	Steel Reign	Fallout 76	PlayStation 4, Windows, Xbox One, PlayStation 5, Xbox Series X/S
2020	Steel Dawn	Fallout 76	PlayStation 4, Windows, Xbox One, PlayStation 5, Xbox Series X/S
2020	Wastelanders	Fallout 76	PlayStation 4, Windows, Xbox One, PlayStation 5, Xbox Series X/S
2027	Raven Rock	Fallout 76	PlayStation 4, Windows, Xbox One, PlayStation 5, Xbox Series X/S
2024	Shattered Space	Starfield	Windows, Xbox Series X/S, PlayStation 5
2026	Terran Armada	Starfield	Windows, Xbox Series X/S, PlayStation 5
2027	Starborn	Starfield	Windows, Xbox Series X/S, PlayStation 5

== Awards ==
- Gamasutra's Best of 2008 — Top Five Developer
- 2011 Spike Video Game Awards — Studio of the Year
- 2015 The Game Awards — Developer of the Year (nominated)
