= The Elder Scrolls IV: Oblivion =

2006 video game

- Developer: Bethesda Game Studios
- Publishers: Bethesda Softworks; 2K (Xbox 360, Windows); Ubisoft (PS3, Europe)
- Producer: Ashley Cheng
- Designer: Ken Rolston
- Programmers: Guy Carver; Craig Walton
- Artist: Matthew Carofano
- Composer: Jeremy Soule
- Series: The Elder Scrolls
- Engine: Gamebryo
- Platforms: Windows; Xbox 360; PlayStation 3
- Release: March 20, 2006: Windows, Xbox 360; NA: March 20, 2006; AU: March 23, 2006; EU: March 24, 2006 Game of the Year Edition; NA: September 10, 2007; EU: September 21, 2007; AU: September 28, 2007 PlayStation 3; NA: March 20, 2007; AU: April 26, 2007; EU: April 27, 2007 Game of the Year Edition; NA: October 16, 2007; AU: December 13, 2007; EU: December 14, 2007
- Genre: Action role-playing
- Mode: Single-player

The Elder Scrolls IV: Oblivion is a 2006 action role-playing game developed by Bethesda Game Studios, and co-published by Bethesda Softworks and 2K Games. It is the fourth installment in The Elder Scrolls series, following 2002's The Elder Scrolls III: Morrowind, and was released for Microsoft Windows and Xbox 360 in 2006, followed by PlayStation 3 in 2007. Taking place within the fictional province of Cyrodiil, the game's main story focuses on the player character's efforts to thwart a fanatical cult known as the Mythic Dawn that plans to open portal gates to a demonic realm known as Oblivion.

The game continues the open-world tradition of its predecessors by allowing the player to travel anywhere in the game world at any time and to ignore or postpone the main storyline indefinitely. A perpetual objective for players is to improve their character's skills, which are numerical representations of certain abilities. Early in the game, seven skills are selected by the player as major skills for their character, with those remaining termed as minor skills.

Development for Oblivion began in 2002, directly after the release of Morrowind, opting for tighter pacing in gameplay and greater plot focus than in past titles. To design the graphics, Bethesda used an improved Havok physics engine, high-dynamic-range lighting, procedural generation tools that allowed developers to quickly create detailed terrains, and the Radiant AI system, which enabled non-player characters (NPCs) to make choices and engage in behaviors more complex than in past titles. The game features fully voiced NPCs—a first for the series—and the music of composer Jeremy Soule.

Upon release, Oblivion was a critical and commercial success, winning a number of industry and publication awards, including several Game of the Year awards. It was praised for its impressive graphics, expansive game world, and schedule-driven NPCs, and is considered one of the greatest games ever made. Following a number of smaller content releases, Bethesda released two expansion packs for the game—Knights of the Nine (2006) and Shivering Isles (2007)—which were bundled with The Elder Scrolls IV: Oblivion Game of the Year Edition in 2007, and later re-released as a fifth-anniversary edition in 2011. Oblivion was followed by The Elder Scrolls V: Skyrim in 2011. A remastered version of Oblivion was released on April 22, 2025, on PlayStation, Xbox, and PC. It was later released on the Nintendo Switch 2 on August 11, 2026.

== Gameplay ==
Oblivion is an open world role-playing game (RPG) that incorporates open-ended gameplay. The player can follow side-quests, interact with NPCs, dispatch monsters, develop their character, and travel anywhere in the province of Cyrodiil at any time while playing the game, provided that the areas are not quest-specific and otherwise inaccessible when not questing. The game never ends, and the player can continue playing after completing the main quest. The gameplay includes a fast-travel system, in which an icon appears on the game world map every time the player visits a new location. This excludes the game world's main cities which are already unlocked for fast travel from the start of the game. The player can arrive at the desired location instantaneously by selecting the icon on the map.

The inventory interface, where the player garbs armor and equips their character

Character development is a primary element of Oblivion. At the beginning of the game, players select one of ten humanoid or anthropomorphic races, each of which has different natural abilities, and customize their character's appearance. A perpetual objective for players is to improve their character's skills, which are numerical representations of their ability in certain areas. Seven skills are selected early in the game as major skills, with the remainder termed minor. The players level up each time they improve their major skills by a total of ten points; this provides the opportunity to improve their attributes. Attributes are more broad character qualities, such as speed and endurance, while skills are more specific, such as armorer or athletics. Afflictions such as disease and poison can reduce the player's attributes. When players reach 25, 50, 75, or 100 points in a single skill, they unlock new abilities related to the skill.

The game's 21 skills fall evenly under the categories of combat, magic, and stealth, and many skills complement more than one area. Combat skills are used primarily for battle and incorporate armor and heavy weapons like blades, axes, maces, and hammers. Magic skills rely on the use of spells to alter the physical world, to affect the minds of others, to injure and debilitate enemies, to summon monsters to help fight, and to heal wounds. Stealth skills allow the player to crack locks, haggle for goods, use speech to manipulate people, and apply cunning in combat through the use of a bow or with a sneak attack. The spells, weapons, and other tools such that a player needs to employ and enhance these skills, such as lockpicks, can be purchased in shops, stolen from NPCs, or found as loot on the bodies of foes or in dungeons.

Oblivion can be played in either a first- or third-person view, except in the mobile phone version, in which the game can only be played in isometric projection. The player may change the level of difficulty at any time, thereby weakening opponents and increasing the chance of success for particular actions. The screen constantly presents a heads-up display, which provides information about the character's health, magicka, and fatigue, all of which can be increased by leveling up. Health can be restored by spells, potions, or resting; the loss of all health results in death. Magicka enables and is depleted by the use of spells; it is rejuvenated naturally over time, but it can be restored similarly to health. Fatigue affects the character's effectiveness in combat and general efficiency, and can be alleviated by resting, potions, and spells.

Throughout the world are a variety of enemies, including standard fantasy monsters such as imps and goblins, and animals such as bears and wolves. Enemies become stronger, and looted weapons and armor more effective as the player levels up. This game mechanic of level-scaling was incorporated to maintain a constant and moderate aspect of difficulty and progression. However, level-scaling combined with the leveling system has received criticism, as it has the potential to unbalance the game; characters with major skills that increase on an involuntary basis, such as athletics or armor, can find that they level too quickly, making the enemies disproportionately harder than intended.

== Synopsis ==
=== Setting ===
Oblivion is set in the year 433 of the Third Era, six years after the events of The Elder Scrolls III: Morrowind, although it is not a direct sequel to Morrowind or any other game in the series. The game is set in Cyrodiil—a province of Tamriel, the continent on which all the games in the series have so far taken place.

Cyrodiil has been the capital of three human empires throughout Tamriel's history. In the distant past, the original empire, known as the Alessian Empire, was founded when a human slave named St. Alessia led an uprising against the Ayleids, an elven faction that at one point held dominion over Tamriel. The Ayleids were devout worshipers of the Daedra, magical creatures from Oblivion, a dangerous realm that is in another dimension. The Daedra are largely sadistic and selfish beings that desire to manipulate and cause chaos throughout Tamriel, and are the antithesis of the Nine Divines, Tamriel's religious pantheon of deities. Blessed by the Divines, Alessia was given the power to drive back the Ayleids and sever their connection to the Daedra by forging a covenant that kept the Daedra out of Tamriel via a mystical barrier. So long as a being of royal blood sat on the throne, the covenant would remain and the Empire would prosper.

In the centuries after Alessia's rule, two different incarnations of the Empire would arise that would continue to follow this covenant, with rulers handpicked by the Divines taking the throne in order to maintain it. Alessia's successor, the Reman Dynasty, rose to power in the aftermath of a war between the Empire and a feudal hegemony from the neighboring continent of Akavir. The Reman Dynasty would pave the way for Tiber Septim, a human warrior, to rise to power and unite the other races and provinces of Tamriel under a single banner. The Septim Dynasty, ruling over the Empire's third and current incarnation, has produced a number of heirs to the throne since Tiber Septim's death and ascension into the hero-god Talos.

=== Plot ===
The story begins with the player imprisoned in a cell for an unknown crime. Emperor Uriel Septim VII (voiced by Patrick Stewart), accompanied by Imperial bodyguards known as the Blades, arrives in the prison when fleeing from assassins who have murdered the emperor's three sons and are now targeting him. The emperor and the Blades reveal that the player's jail cell contains a secret entrance to a part of the city's sewer that functions as an escape route. Pardoned by the emperor, the player follows the group into the sewer where they come under attack by assassins. The Blades' captain is cut down during the fighting that ensues. Knowing he is destined to die by the hands of the assassins, Uriel Septim entrusts the player with the Amulet of Kings, worn by the Septim emperors of Tamriel, and orders the player to take it to Jauffre (voiced by Ralph Cosham), the grandmaster of the Blades. Immediately afterward, one of the assassins kills the emperor. The player escapes the sewer and heads out into the open world of Cyrodiil.

The lack of an heir for Uriel Septim has broken St. Alessia's covenant, allowing the Daedra to access Tamriel from Oblivion. Multiple gates to Oblivion open and an invasion of Tamriel begins by the Daedra killing and destroying anything in their path. Jauffre tells the player the only way to close the gates permanently is to find someone of the royal bloodline to retake the throne and relight the Dragonfires—with the Amulet of Kings—in the Imperial City. There is an illegitimate son named Martin (voiced by Sean Bean) who is a priest in the city of Kvatch. Upon arriving at Kvatch, the player finds that the Daedra have destroyed the city with very few surviving. A massive Oblivion Gate is obstructing the main city entrance and the player must venture through the gate into the Deadlands—one of the planes of Oblivion—in order to close it from the inside and allow access to the city. After closing the gate, the player enters Kvatch and takes it back from the Daedra with the assistance of surviving guardsmen. Martin has survived, and the player persuades him to come to Weynon Priory.

The player, now recognized as the Hero of Kvatch, returns to Weynon Priory with Martin, finding that it has come under attack by assassins and that the Amulet of Kings has been stolen. The player escorts Jauffre and Martin to Cloud Ruler Temple, the stronghold of the Blades in Cyrodiil. Martin is recognized as the emperor and is given command of the Blades. The player is optionally entered into their ranks and sets off in search of the amulet. After gathering information, the player learns that the group responsible for Uriel Septim's assassination and the theft of the amulet are the Mythic Dawn, a cult dedicated to the worshiping of Mehrunes Dagon, the Daedric Prince of Destruction. The cult believes Dagon is the true creator of the world and wish for him to "cleanse" it of all impurities. Killing the emperor and thus removing the barriers to Oblivion was the first step in realizing this. The player attempts to infiltrate the secret meeting place of the cult in the hopes of retrieving the amulet. When the player does so, the cult's leader Mankar Camoran (voiced by Terence Stamp) escapes through a portal, taking the amulet with him. The player takes the book that had opened the portal to Martin, who deduces a way to reopen the portal. The player seeks out three key artifacts necessary to recreate the portal: a Daedric artifact, The Blood of the Divines, and a Great Welkynd Stone. With all three retrieved, Martin reveals that a final ingredient is needed: a Great Sigil Stone from inside a Great Gate similar to the one that devastated Kvatch. Martin and Jauffre decide to allow the city of Bruma to be attacked by Daedra so that a Great Gate would be opened. Once it is, the player obtains the Stone and closes the Gate, also saving Bruma.

A portal is created at Cloud Ruler Temple and the player is sent through to Mankar Camoran's created realm of Paradise. After bypassing Daedra, Mythic Dawn members and obstacles, the player confronts Camoran and kills him. The player returns the Amulet of Kings to Martin and they subsequently travel to the Imperial City with the Blades to relight the Dragonfires, and end the Daedric invasion. They find the city under attack by Daedra and an enormous avatar of Mehrunes Dagon himself. The player and Martin fight their way to the Temple of the One. There, Martin laments that they are powerless against Dagon's avatar and explains that they can only defeat him one way. He bids farewell to the player and shatters the Amulet of Kings, merging himself with the spirit of Akatosh, the Dragon-God of Time, thus becoming Akatosh's avatar. After a battle, Akatosh casts Dagon back into Oblivion and lets out a mighty roar before turning to stone. Martin, whose soul was consumed by the amulet, enters the afterlife to join his forebears. In a telepathic monologue to the player, he sheds an optimistic light, explaining that while the Amulet of Kings is destroyed and the throne again lies empty, the gates of Oblivion are now shut and the future of Tamriel lies in the player's hands. The Empire's high chancellor sincerely thanks the player for their service during the crisis and proclaims them as the seventh Champion of Cyrodiil.

== Development ==
The game was developed by Bethesda Game Studios, a United States-based software company. The Elder Scrolls III: Morrowind's lead designer Ken Rolston oversaw the development team. The PC and Xbox 360 versions of the game were co-published by 2K Games and Bethesda Softworks, while the PlayStation 3 version was co-published by Ubisoft in Europe alongside Bethesda. Work on Oblivion began shortly after the release of Morrowind in 2002. By mid-September 2004, Oblivion had been officially announced, and its title revealed.

During Oblivion's development, Bethesda concentrated on creating a system with a more realistic storyline, believable characters, and meaningful quests than had been done in the past. In comparison with previous titles in the series, the game features improved artificial intelligence thanks to the use of Bethesda proprietary Radiant AI software, and enhanced physics facilitated by the Havok physics engine. The graphics took advantage of advanced lighting and shader routines such as high-dynamic-range rendering (HDR) and specular mapping that became significantly more feasible in the seventh console generation. Bethesda developed and implemented procedural generation tools in the building of Oblivion's terrain, leading to the expedited creation of landscapes that are more complex and realistic than in past titles.

An in-game screenshot showing Oblivion's graphical user interface, HDR lighting, and long draw distance, improvements made as part of a goal to create "cutting-edge graphics"

While designing Oblivion's landscape and architecture, developers worked from personal travel photographs, nature books, texture images, and reference photographs. Procedural generation tools used in production allowed for the creation of realistic environments at much faster rates than was the case with Morrowind. Erosion algorithms incorporated in the landscape generation tools allowed for the creation of craggy terrain quickly and easily, replacing Morrowind's artificially smoothed-over terrain.

Owing to a new Level-of-Detail system, Oblivion's view distance is far greater than its predecessor's, extending player sightlines to the horizon and giving views of distant towns and mountain ranges. According to a Microsoft press release, Oblivion's game world is approximately 16 square miles (41 square kilometers) in size. Wilderness quests, ruins, and dungeons were added to fill surplus space. Content in the dungeons is more densely packed than in dungeons in Morrowind, with an increase in the frequency of creature encounters, quest-related NPCs, and puzzles. However, the populations represented in Oblivion do not match the "thousands upon thousands" described in previous in-game literature. The development team decided to set the NPC populations at a level that would play well, rather than one that would match game lore, since the presence of a large number of NPCs on screen would have caused the game to slow down.

In response to the criticism that NPC behavior had been too simplistic in Morrowind, Bethesda developed the Radiant AI system for Oblivion. NPCs were designed to make choices, rather than complete scripted routines, to achieve predetermined goals. The manner in which goals such as eating, sleeping, reading, and speaking to others are fulfilled is dependent upon the environment, the choices of other NPCs, and programmed personality values. For example, an NPC without money whose goal is to find food may eventually resort to stealing from others, if they are given the opportunity and if it is in their character. These development mechanics allowed Bethesda to create NPCs who could engage in complex activities. This would be scaled down in later entries, due to the systems's tendency to cause NPCs to kill each other over time in response to witnessing thefts.

=== Audio ===
Oblivion features the voices of Patrick Stewart, Lynda Carter, Sean Bean, and Terence Stamp, with celebrity acquisition and voice production being handled by Blindlight. The voice acting received mixed reviews in the gaming press. While many publications praised it as excellent, others found fault with its repetitiveness. The issue has been blamed on the small number of voice actors and the blandness of the dialogue itself. Lead designer Ken Rolston found the plan to fully voice the game "less flexible, less apt for user projection of his own tone, more constrained for branching, and more trouble for production and disk real estate" than Morrowind's partially recorded dialogue. Rolston tempered his criticism with the suggestion that voice acting "can be a powerful expressive tool" and can contribute significantly to the charm and ambiance of the game. He stated, "I prefer Morrowind's partially recorded dialogue, for many reasons. But I'm told that fully-voiced dialogue is what the kids want."

Oblivion's score was composed by series mainstay Jeremy Soule, a video game composer whose past scores had earned him a British Academy of Film and Television Arts (BAFTA) award in the "Game Music Category" and two nominations for an Academy of Interactive Arts & Sciences (AIAS) award for "Original Music Composition". The official soundtrack to Oblivion, featuring 26 tracks spanning 58 minutes, was released in March 2006, via Soule's digital distributor DirectSong. Soule had worked with Bethesda and Todd Howard during the creation of Morrowind. In a press release announcing his return for Oblivion, Soule repeated the words he had said during Morrowind's press release: "The stunning, epic quality of The Elder Scrolls series is particularly compatible with the grand, orchestral style of music I enjoy composing the most." As in his compositions for Morrowind, Soule chose to create a soft and minimalist score so as not to wear out users' ears. Soule stated that while composing the music, he did not imagine any specific characters or events; rather, he wanted it "to comment on the human condition and the beauty of life". In a 2006 interview, he related that this desire came as a result of a car accident that occurred during his composition of the score. He said, "I ended up rolling in my car several times on an interstate while flying headlong into oncoming traffic ... I felt no fear ... I simply just acknowledged to myself that I've had a good life and I would soon have to say goodbye to all of it in a matter of seconds." Soule sustained only minor injuries, but commented that his feeling during the crash—"that life is indeed precious"—remained with him throughout the rest of the composition.

=== Remaster ===
An internal ZeniMax Media presentation, dated to 2020 and released as part of the FTC v. Microsoft case in 2023, indicated that an Oblivion remaster, among other unannounced titles, was earmarked for a release in the 2022 fiscal year. On April 15, 2025, several in-game images, promotional art, and other materials were leaked from Virtuos' websites through an accessible WordPress file repository. The images showed recognizable themes such as the player's first view of the outside world upon leaving the tutorial quest, the Imperial City and its surroundings, and several other highlights.

On April 21, 2025, Bethesda released a promotional image on Twitter announcing a livestream on YouTube and Twitch the next day, confirming the leaks; the live announcement on YouTube was watched by more than 600,000 people. Shortly after the presentation began, the game was released on Windows, PlayStation 5, and Xbox Series X/S, in addition to day-one availability on Xbox Game Pass, to generally positive reviews. The game reached 4 million players three days after release, with a peak of 216,000 concurrent players on Steam.

The remaster is built upon a modified version of the original Gamebryo engine, made to be headless and pass the game state into the modern Unreal Engine 5, which is used to render the game itself. The Remaster as a result is capable of ray-traced lighting and much higher detail models.

== Marketing and release ==
Oblivion's public debut occurred on May 18, 2005, at the Electronic Entertainment Expo (E3) in Los Angeles. The version shown at E3 was substantially finished; most of the content was already in the game, lacking only the polish that the final months of development would bring. Most viewers were impressed by Oblivion's showing, and the game won a number of "best of" awards from a variety of game journalists, among them GameSpy's "RPG Game of Show", GameSpot's "Best Role-Playing Game", IGN's "Best PC RPG", RPGFan's "Overall Game of E3 2005", and the prestigious "Best Role Playing Game" in the 2005 E3 Game Critics Awards. A near-final build of Oblivion was shown at Microsoft's Consumer Electronics Show press tent in January 2006, showcasing the game's exteriors. In the months prior to release, anticipation for the game ran high, with critics describing Oblivion as "the first next-gen game" only heightening attention. Pete Hines, vice president of public relations and marketing for Bethesda, said: "People were expecting the game to cure blindness and heal the sick."

2K Games had aimed for a late 2005 publication so that the game could be an Xbox 360 launch title. The official release date for the PC and Xbox 360 versions was originally November 22, 2005, but developmental delays pushed it back to March 20, 2006. A mobile phone version of the game, developed by Superscape and published by Vir2L Studios, was released on May 2, 2006. The PlayStation 3 version of the game (ported by 4J Studios) was released on March 20, 2007, in North America and on April 27, 2007, in Europe. This version includes graphical improvements that had been made since the PC and Xbox 360 release, and was subsequently praised for its enhanced visual appeal. A PlayStation Portable version of the game was also in development before being canceled.

At the 2007 E3, the Game of the Year edition for Oblivion was announced. In North America and Europe, the game was released in September 2007, for the Xbox 360 and PC, and in October 2007, for the PS3; in Australia, it was released in September 2007, for the Xbox 360 and PC, and in December 2007, for the PS3. It was also released on Steam on June 16, 2009. A 5th-anniversary edition of Oblivion was announced and released in North America in July 2011 and in Europe two months later. Xbox 360 and PC versions of Fallout 3 and Oblivion double pack was announced for release in North America on April 3; however, it was not mentioned whether the bundled games include any of the downloadable content released for either game. Oblivion was also bundled with BioShock as a double pack on Xbox 360 and PC on July 7, 2009.

=== Rating change ===
On May 3, 2006, the Entertainment Software Rating Board (ESRB) in North America changed Oblivion's rating from T (Teen 13+) to M (Mature 17+), citing game content not considered in the ESRB review, i.e., "more detailed depictions of blood and gore than were considered in the original rating of the game, as well as the presence in the PC version of the game of a locked-out art file that, if accessed by using an apparently unauthorized third party tool, allows the user to play the game with topless versions of female characters." In response to the new content, the ESRB conducted a review of Oblivion, showing to its reviewers the content originally submitted by Bethesda along with the newly disclosed content.

The ESRB reported that Bethesda Softworks would promptly notify all retailers of the change, issue stickers for retailers and distributors to affix on the product, display the new rating in all following product shipments and marketing, and create a downloadable patch rendering the topless skin inaccessible. Bethesda complied with the request but disagreed with the ESRB's rationale. Some retailers began to check for ID before selling Oblivion as a result, and one California Assemblyman used the event to criticize the ESRB's inefficiency. Michael Zenke, editor of Slashdot games, remarked on the change's chilling effect, which punished developers for content they did not produce.

== Additional content ==
Starting in April 2006, Bethesda released small packages of additional downloadable content (DLC) for the game from their website and over the Xbox Live Marketplace. The first update came as a set of specialized armor for Oblivion's ridable horses; released on April 3, 2006. Although gamers generally displayed enthusiasm for the concept of micropayments for downloadable in-game content, many expressed their dissatisfaction at the price they had to pay for the relatively minor horse-armor package on the Internet and elsewhere. Hines assured the press that Bethesda was not going to respond rashly to customer criticism. New releases continued into late 2006, at lower prices with more substantial content, leading to a better reception in the gaming press. Other small DLC packs include a set of houses themed after the game's factions, a new dungeon, and new spells that were absent in the initial release. Oblivion's final content pack was released on October 15, 2007.

The Elder Scrolls IV: Knights of the Nine is an official expansion for Oblivion released on November 21, 2006. Downloadable on the Xbox Live marketplace for the Xbox 360 and available for retail purchase for PC users, the expansion content was included in the original version of the PlayStation 3 release. The expansion was developed, published, and released by Bethesda Softworks. The plot of Knights of the Nine centers on the rise of the sorcerer-king Umaril and the player's quest to defeat him with the aid of the lost crusader's relics. Although it made little change to the basic mechanics of Oblivion, it was judged by reviewers to be a brief but polished addition to the game's main plot.

The Elder Scrolls IV: Shivering Isles was released on March 27, 2007, for Windows and Xbox 360, and December 8, 2007, for PlayStation 3. The expansion offers more than 30 hours of new adventuring, and features new quests, voice acting, monsters, spells, armor, and expanded freeform gameplay. It features a new land "that [players] can watch change according to [their] vital life-or-death decisions." Shivering Isles takes place in the realm of madness ruled over by the Daedric prince Sheogorath. The player is tasked by Sheogorath with saving the realm from an approaching cataclysm known as the Greymarch.

== Reception ==
Reception

Aggregate score
| Aggregator | Score |
|---|---|
| Metacritic | 94/100 (X360); 93/100 (PS3); 94/100 (PC) |

Review scores
| Publication | Score |
|---|---|
| 1Up.com | A |
| AllGame | 4.5/5 |
| Famitsu | 38/40 (X360) |
| GameSpot | 9.6/10 (X360); 9.5/10 (PS3); 9.3/10 (PC) |
| GameSpy | 4/5 |
| IGN | 9.3/10 (X360); 9.2/10 (PS3); 9.3/10 (PC) |
| Official Xbox Magazine (US) | 9.5/10 (X360) |
| PC Gamer (US) | 95/100 (PC) |

Oblivion received universal acclaim from critics, and became a commercial success. The game had shipped 1.7 million copies by April 10, 2006, and sold over 3 million copies by January 2007. US sales were 3.3 million by November 2011. Electronic Entertainment Design and Research, a market research firm, estimates that the game has sold 9.5 million copies worldwide. Reviewers praised the game for its impressive graphics, expansive game world, and schedule-driven NPCs. Eurogamer editor Kristan Reed stated that the game "successfully unites some of the best elements of RPG, adventure and action games and fuses them into a relentlessly immersive and intoxicating whole." GameSpot's Greg Kasavin wrote that compared to Morrowind, which was one of the best role-playing games he has seen in years, "Oblivion is hands-down better, so much so that even those who'd normally have no interest in a role-playing game should find it hard to resist getting swept up in this big, beautiful, meticulously crafted world." X-Play's Jason D'Aprile stated, "All the games in this series have been known for their sheer vastness and freedom of choice, but the Elder Scrolls IV takes that concept and runs with it."

GamesTM editors noted that the game is "heavily steeped in RPG tradition, however, its appeal stretches far beyond the hardcore RPG demographic thanks to its ease of play, boundless ambition and focused attention to detail." Scott Tobias of The A.V. Club wrote that the game is "worth playing for the sense of discovery—each environment looks different from the last and requires a nuanced reaction—makes the action addictive." GameZone staff commented on how one can spend a lot of the gameplay time by leveling up his or her character, doing various quests, and customizing the character before even starting the main quest. IGN editor Charles Onyett praised the game's storytelling and "easy to navigate menus".

Despite the praise, Patrick Joynt of 1UP.com criticized the conversations between in-game NPCs and the player: "When an NPC greets you with a custom piece of dialogue (such as a guard's warning) and then reverts to the standard options (like a guard's cheerful directions just after that warning) it's more jarring than the canned dialogue by itself." GameRevolution's Duke Ferris noted that "the voices occasionally repeat" but was impressed that the developers managed to fit a lot of voiced dialog into the game, where most is "high-quality work". GameSpy''s Justin Speer criticized the "disruptive loading stutters while moving across the game world" and long loading times. Speer noted several miscellaneous bugs, such as unintended floating objects and unsynchronized lip-synching and speech. Onyett of IGN criticized the disjunction between enemies that scaled up according to the player's level and not their combat abilities or NPC allies, the loading times and the imprecision in the combat system, but stated that "none of those minor criticisms hold back Oblivion from being a thoroughly enjoyable, user-friendly, gorgeous experience with enough content to keep you returning time and time again."

Oblivion won a number of industry and publication awards. In 2006, the game was awarded the title "Game of the Year" at the G-Phoria Video Game Awards and at the Spike TV Video Game Awards. At the 24th annual Golden Joystick Awards, Oblivion was awarded "PLAY.com Ultimate Game of the Year", "Xbox Game of the Year", and "ebuyer.com PC Game of the Year". The game was titled the best role-playing game of 2006 by 1UP.com, G4, IGN, GameSpy, GameSpot, GameRevolution, and PC Gamer US. The editors of Computer Games Magazine presented Oblivion with their 2006 "Best Technology" and "Best Role-Playing Game" awards, and named it the second-best computer game of the year. They summarized it as "an unforgettable masterpiece". In 2007, PC Gamer magazine rated Oblivion number one on their list of the top 100 games of all time. During the 10th Annual Interactive Achievement Awards, the Academy of Interactive Arts & Sciences awarded Oblivion with "Role-Playing Game of the Year" and "Computer Game of the Year", along with receiving nominations for "Overall Game of the Year", and outstanding achievement in "Character Performance - Female" (Lynda Carter), "Game Design", "Gameplay Engineering", "Original Music Composition", and "Sound Design". In addition to the awards won by the game itself, Patrick Stewart's voicework as Uriel Septim won a Spike TV award, and the musical score by composer Jeremy Soule won the inaugural MTV Video Music Award for "Best Original Score" through an international popular vote.
