= Todd Howard =

American video game designer (born 1970)

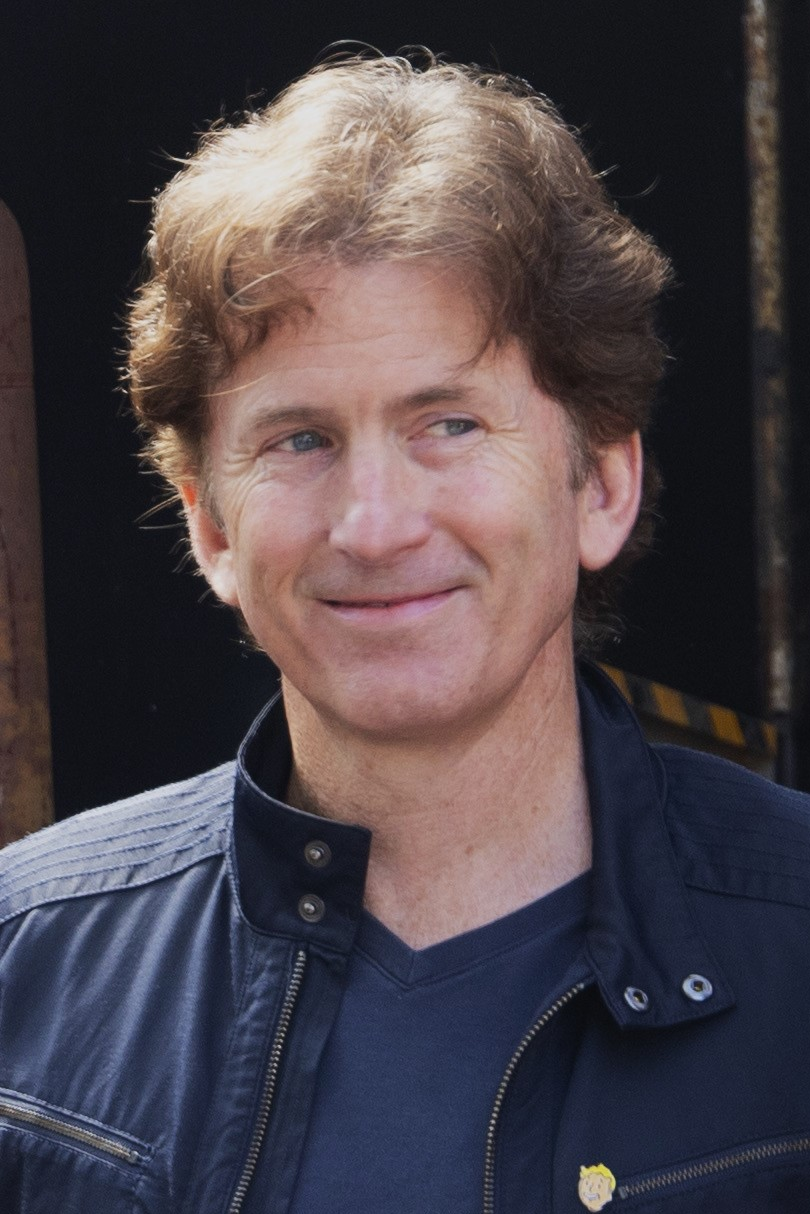
- Howard in 2024
- Born: Todd Andrew Howard; 1970 (age 55–56); Lower Macungie Township, Pennsylvania, U.S.
- Education: College of William & Mary (BBA)
- Occupations: Video game designer, director, producer
- Years active: 1994–present
- Employer: Bethesda Game Studios
- Known for: The Elder Scrolls, Fallout
- Spouse: Kimberly Yaissle (m. 1995)
- Children: 2

Todd Andrew Howard (born 1970) is an American video game designer, director, and producer who serves as director and executive producer at Bethesda Game Studios. Joining the company in 1994, he has since led the development of The Elder Scrolls and Fallout series, as well as Starfield (2023).

== Early life and education ==
Todd Andrew Howard was born in 1970 in Lower Macungie Township, Pennsylvania, to Ronald and Priscilla Howard. His elder brother, Jeffrey Mark Howard, later became the director of creative affairs for Disney, where he oversaw the production of Bambi II. Todd developed an interest in computers, particularly video games, at a very young age. Howard says the 1980s role-playing video games Wizardry and Ultima III: Exodus were inspirations for his future games.

Howard attended Emmaus High School in Emmaus, Pennsylvania, where he graduated in 1989. He then attended the College of William & Mary in Williamsburg, Virginia, where he majored in business while taking computer classes for credit. He graduated from William and Mary in 1993, with a Bachelor of Business Administration degree. Howard later stated that a business major appeared as the easiest path through college.

During the holiday break of his senior year in college, Howard obtained a copy of Wayne Gretzky Hockey (1988) by Bethesda Softworks in Rockville, Maryland. On Martin Luther King Jr. Day, he visited the offices of Bethesda Softworks, which he passed by on his commute to school. He asked for a job at the company but was rejected and told that he needed to finish school as a prerequisite. After graduating, he returned to Bethesda seeking a job, but was rejected again due to a lack of job opportunities then at the company. Howard then started working for a smaller game company in Yorktown, Virginia, which enabled him to visit several conventions like the Consumer Electronics Show, where he continued approaching Bethesda to request being hired.

== Career ==
Bethesda Softworks eventually recruited Howard in 1994 as a producer. His first game development credit for Bethesda was as the producer and designer of The Terminator: Future Shock (1995), followed by work as a designer on Skynet and The Elder Scrolls II: Daggerfall, both released in 1996. He was project leader for the first time on The Elder Scrolls Adventures: Redguard, released in 1998.

In 2000, Howard was appointed project leader and designer for The Elder Scrolls III: Morrowind and the expansions that followed. The game was released in 2002 and was a critical and commercial success, winning several Game of the Year awards. He then led the creation of The Elder Scrolls IV: Oblivion (2006) as its executive producer. After this, he served as game director and executive producer of Fallout 3, released in 2008.

Howard returned to The Elder Scrolls series to lead the development as the creative director of its fifth installment, The Elder Scrolls V: Skyrim, which was released in November 2011. He subsequently directed Fallout 4, released in November 2015, and produced Fallout 76, a multiplayer installment in the series that attracted criticism upon its release in November 2018. Howard also served as the executive producer of Indiana Jones and the Great Circle, released by MachineGames and Lucasfilm Games.

=== Opinions and recognition ===
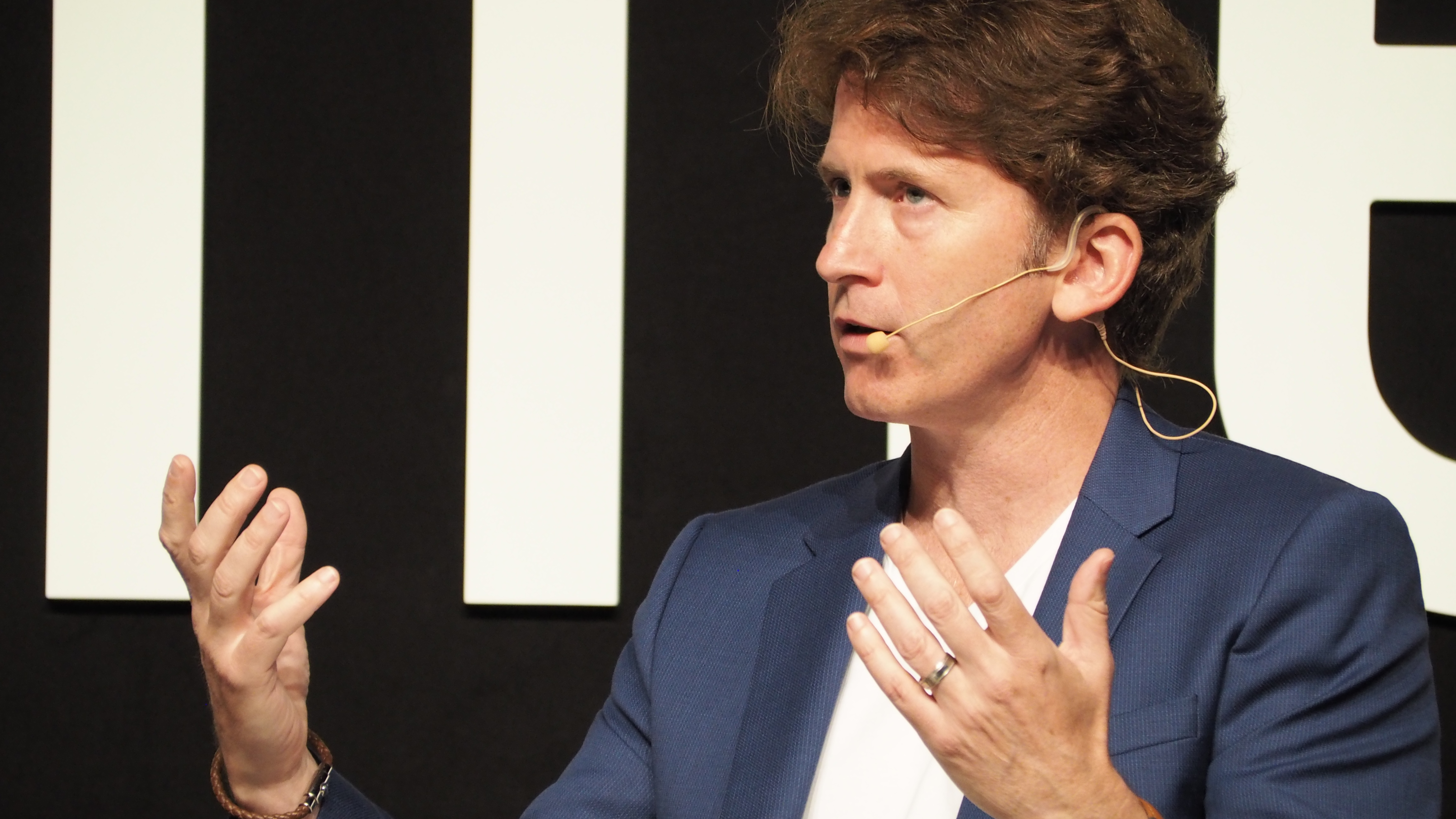
Howard in June 2018

Howard admitted in 2011 that The Elder Scrolls IV: Oblivion had sacrificed what made The Elder Scrolls III: Morrowind "particular", saying: "With Oblivion, we're dealing with the capital province, and we wanted to get back to the more classic Arena and Daggerfall feel of a fantasy world that felt more refined and welcoming. But in that, we sacrificed some of what made Morrowind special: the wonder of discovery." He said Bethesda's philosophy for The Elder Scrolls games was to allow people to "live another life, in another world".

In 2012, Howard also said he was favorable to modding in video games, claiming he did not understand why many developers do not allow it. In 2016, after the release of Fallout 4, Howard admitted that he was well aware of the criticisms received by the game, especially with regards to the dialogue system, saying: "The way we did some dialogue stuff [in Fallout 4], that didn't work as well. But I know the reasons we tried that – to make a nice interactive conversation – but [it was] less successful than some other things in the game."

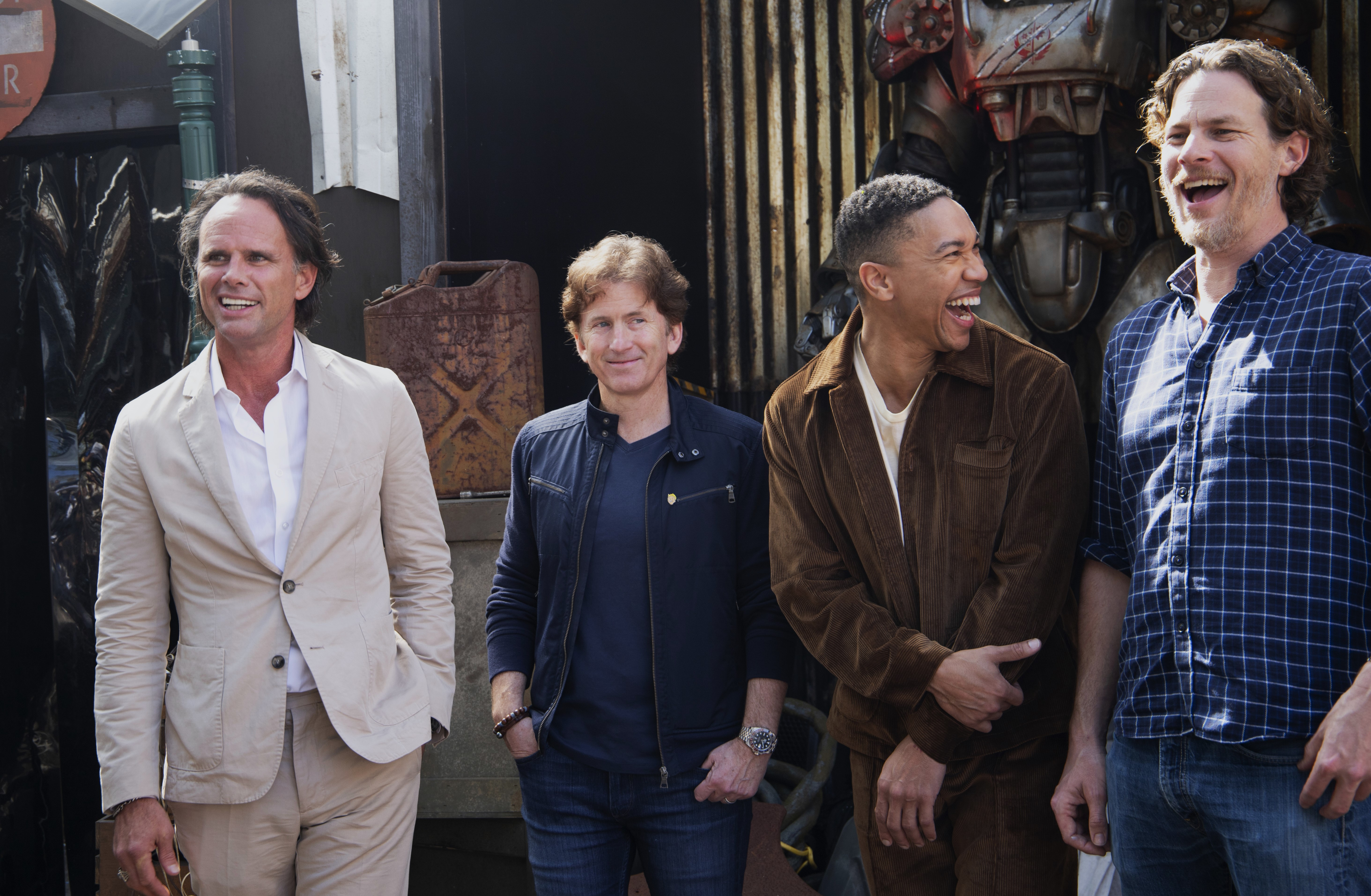
Howard (second from left) with Walton Goggins, Aaron Moten and Jonathan Nolan at South by Southwest 2024

Howard has spoken at industry events and conferences. In 2009, he spoke to developers at the D.I.C.E. Summit, sharing his rules of game development. He returned as a keynote speaker at the 2012 D.I.C.E. Summit. He said developers should ignore demographics and installed base, and follow their passions, saying that "if install base really mattered, we'd all make board games, because there are a lot of tables".

Howard's work has often received attention by the generalist media and press; his games have been featured in Newsweek, CNN, USA Today, and The Today Show. The high popularity of the games Howard has directed and produced has turned him, and some of his quotes, into Internet memes.

Howard was the 16th recipient of a Game Developers Conference Lifetime Achievement Award. The magazine GamePro named him among the "Top 20 Most Influential People in Gaming over the Last 20 Years". Howard also received the D.I.C.E. Award for "Outstanding Achievement in Game Direction" in 2012 and 2016. In 2014, he was awarded the Lara of Honor, a lifetime achievement award from Germany. In 2013, IGN listed Howard 70th in a ranking of "The Top 100 Game Creators of All Time". He was inducted into the Hall of Fame of the Academy of Interactive Arts & Sciences in 2017. In 2020, Howard received the 2020 Develop Star award for "outstanding achievements and contribution to the industry".

During an appearance on Lex Fridman's podcast, Howard stated that he considers Tetris to be the greatest game ever created. He also stated that Ultima VII: The Black Gate is one of his personal favorites, and it had a large influence on the games he has developed.

== Personal life ==
Howard married Kimberly Yaissle on July 8, 1995, at St. Thomas More Catholic Church in Allentown, Pennsylvania. He has two sons.

== Ludography ==
Year	Title	Role(s)
1995	The Terminator: Future Shock	Production, additional design
1996	Skynet	Production, design
1996	The Elder Scrolls II: Daggerfall	Additional design
1998	The Elder Scrolls Adventures: Redguard	Game director, project leader, design, writer
1999	Protector	Executive producer
2000	Sea Dogs	Additional Game Design and Editing/Writing
2002	The Elder Scrolls III: Morrowind	Game director, project leader and original concept
2003	The Elder Scrolls III: Bloodmoon	Executive producer
2004	The Elder Scrolls Travels: Shadowkey	Executive producer
2006	The Elder Scrolls IV: Oblivion	Executive producer
2007	The Elder Scrolls IV: Shivering Isles	Executive producer
2008	Fallout 3	Game director
2011	The Elder Scrolls V: Skyrim	Game director
2012	The Elder Scrolls V: Skyrim – Dawnguard	Game director
2012	The Elder Scrolls V: Skyrim – Hearthfire	Game director
2012	The Elder Scrolls V: Skyrim – Dragonborn	Game director
2015	Fallout Shelter	Executive producer
2015	Fallout 4	Game director
2018	Fallout 76	Executive producer
2019	The Elder Scrolls: Blades	Executive producer
2023	Starfield	Game director
2024	Indiana Jones and the Great Circle	Executive producer and Story
TBA	The Elder Scrolls VI: Sentinel	Game director
TBA	Fallout 5	Game director

== Uncredited ==
Year	Title	Role
1994	NCAA Basketball: Road to the Final Four 2	Producer
1994	The Elder Scrolls: Arena	Tester
2010	Fallout: New Vegas	Advisor/Special Thanks
2014	The Elder Scrolls Online	Advisor/Special Thanks
