= List of Bethesda Softworks video games =

This is a list of video games published by Bethesda Softworks, an American video game developer and publisher.

== List of video games ==
Title	System	Release date	Developer(s)	Ref.
Gridiron!	Amiga	1986	Bethesda Softworks	
Gridiron!	Atari ST	1987	Bethesda Softworks	
Wayne Gretzky Hockey	Amiga	April 1989	Bethesda Softworks	
Wayne Gretzky Hockey	Atari ST	September 1989	Bethesda Softworks	
Wayne Gretzky Hockey	MS-DOS	April 1989	Bethesda Softworks	
Escape from Singe's Castle	MS-DOS	1989	Bethesda Softworks	
Wayne Gretzky Hockey 2	MS-DOS	1990	Bethesda Softworks	
Wayne Gretzky Hockey 2	Amiga	1990	Bethesda Softworks	
Wayne Gretzky Hockey 2	NES	1990	Bethesda Softworks	
Damocles	Atari ST	1991	Novagen Software Ltd	
Damocles	Amiga	1991	Novagen Software Ltd	
The Terminator	MS-DOS	July 1991	Bethesda Softworks	
Home Alone	NES	1991	Bethesda Softworks	
Where's Waldo	NES	1991	Bethesda Softworks	
NCAA Basketball: Road to the Final Four	MS-DOS	1992	Bethesda Softworks and Mirage Graphics	
The Terminator: 2029	MS-DOS	1992	Bethesda Softworks	
Hockey League Simulator 2	MS-DOS	October 1992	Bethesda Softworks	
Wayne Gretzky Hockey 3	MS-DOS	October 1992	Bethesda Softworks	
The Terminator: Rampage	MS-DOS	1993	Bethesda Softworks	
Sword of Sodan	Mac OS	1993	Bethesda Softworks	
Delta V	MS-DOS	1994	Bethesda Softworks	
The Elder Scrolls: Arena	MS-DOS	March 25, 1994	Bethesda Softworks	
NCAA Basketball: Road to the Final Four 2	MS-DOS	March 31, 1994	Bethesda Softworks	
PBA Bowling	Windows	November 15, 1995	Bethesda Softworks and MediaTech West	
The Terminator: Future Shock	MS-DOS	December 1995	Bethesda Softworks	
The Elder Scrolls II: Daggerfall	MS-DOS	September 20, 1996	Bethesda Softworks and MediaTech West	
Skynet	MS-DOS	November 20, 1996	Bethesda Softworks and MediaTech West	
XCar: Experimental Racing	MS-DOS	August 22, 1997	MediaTech West	
An Elder Scrolls Legend: Battlespire	MS-DOS	December 1997	Bethesda Softworks	
Burnout: Championship Drag Racing	MS-DOS	March 20, 1998	MediaTech West	
The Elder Scrolls Adventures: Redguard	MS-DOS	November 14, 1998	Bethesda Softworks	
Symbiocom	Mac OS	1998	Istvan Pely Productions	
Symbiocom	Windows	1998	Istvan Pely Productions	
Zero Critical	Mac OS	1998	Istvan Pely Productions	
Zero Critical	Windows	1998	Istvan Pely Productions	
Magic & Mayhem	Windows	May 5, 1999	Mythos Games	
F-16 Aggressor	Windows	May 1999	General Simulations	
NIRA Intense Import Drag Racing	MS-DOS	May 1999	Bethesda Softworks	
Protector	Atari Jaguar	November 27, 1999	Bethesda Softworks	
PBA Tour Bowling 2	Windows	February 2000	Bethesda Softworks	
Gromada	Windows	April 24, 2000	Buka Entertainment	
Sea Dogs	Windows	October 2000	Akella and Bethesda Softworks	
PBA Tour Bowling 2001	Dreamcast	November 30, 2000	Bethesda Softworks	
IHRA Drag Racing	Windows	December 4, 2000	Bethesda Softworks	
Echelon	Windows	May 2001	MADia Entertainment	
Magic & Mayhem: The Art of Magic	Windows	October 23, 2001	Climax Studios	
IHRA Drag Racing	PlayStation	November 20, 2001	Digital Dialect	
The Elder Scrolls III: Morrowind	Windows	May 1, 2002	Bethesda Game Studios	
The Elder Scrolls III: Morrowind	Xbox	June 6, 2002	Bethesda Game Studios	
IHRA Drag Racing 2	PlayStation 2	2002	Bethesda Softworks	
The Elder Scrolls Travels: Stormhold	J2ME, BREW	2003	Vir2L Studios	
The Elder Scrolls Travels: Dawnstar	J2ME, BREW	2003	Vir2L Studios	
Puzznic	PlayStation	May 2, 2003	Altron	
Pirates of the Caribbean	Windows	June 30, 2003	Akella	
Pirates of the Caribbean	Xbox	July 1, 2003	Akella	
IHRA Drag Racing 2004	Xbox	November 2003	Super Happy Fun Fun	
IHRA Professional Drag Racing 2005	Xbox	November 2004	Bethesda Game Studios	
IHRA Professional Drag Racing 2005	PlayStation 2	November 2004	Bethesda Game Studios	
The Elder Scrolls Travels: Shadowkey	N-Gage	November 2004	Vir2L Studios	
IHRA Professional Drag Racing 2005	Windows	June 17, 2005	Bethesda Game Studios	
Breeders' Cup World Thoroughbred Championships	PlayStation 2	September 21, 2005	4J Studios	
Breeders' Cup World Thoroughbred Championships	Xbox	September 21, 2005	4J Studios	
Call of Cthulhu: Dark Corners of the Earth	Xbox	October 24, 2005	Headfirst Productions	
The Elder Scrolls IV: Oblivion	Windows	March 20, 2006	Bethesda Game Studios	
The Elder Scrolls IV: Oblivion	Xbox 360	March 20, 2006	Bethesda Game Studios	
The Elder Scrolls IV: Oblivion	PlayStation 3	March 19, 2007	Bethesda Game Studios	
Call of Cthulhu: Dark Corners of the Earth	Windows	March 27, 2006	Headfirst Productions	
The Elder Scrolls Travels: Oblivion	J2ME, BREW	May 2, 2006	Superscape	
IHRA Drag Racing: Sportsman Edition	Windows	June 12, 2006	Bethesda Game Studios	
IHRA Drag Racing: Sportsman Edition	PlayStation 2	June 13, 2006	Bethesda Game Studios	
IHRA Drag Racing: Sportsman Edition	Xbox 360	June 28, 2006	Bethesda Game Studios	
Pirates of the Caribbean: The Legend of Jack Sparrow	Windows	June 28, 2006	7 Studios, Buena Vista Games	
Pirates of the Caribbean: The Legend of Jack Sparrow	PlayStation 2	June 28, 2006	7 Studios, Buena Vista Games	
Star Trek: Encounters	PlayStation 2	October 3, 2006	4J Studios	
Star Trek: Tactical Assault	Nintendo DS	October 26, 2006	Quicksilver Software	
Star Trek: Tactical Assault	PlayStation Portable	November 14, 2006	Quicksilver Software	
Star Trek: Legacy	Windows	December 2006	Mad Doc Software	
Star Trek: Legacy	Xbox 360	December 15, 2006	Mad Doc Software	
Star Trek: Conquest	PlayStation 2	November 20, 2007	4J Studios	
Star Trek: Conquest	Wii	November 20, 2007	4J Studios	
Ducati Moto	Nintendo DS	July 1, 2008	4J Studios	
Fallout 3	Windows	October 28, 2008	Bethesda Game Studios	
Fallout 3	PlayStation 3	October 28, 2008	Bethesda Game Studios	
Fallout 3	Xbox 360	October 28, 2008	Bethesda Game Studios	
Wheelspin	Wii	August 18, 2009	Awesome Play	
Wet	PlayStation 3	September 15, 2009	Artificial Mind and Movement	
Wet	Xbox 360	September 15, 2009	Artificial Mind and Movement	
Rogue Warrior	Windows	December 1, 2009	Rebellion Developments	
Rogue Warrior	PlayStation 3	December 1, 2009	Rebellion Developments	
Rogue Warrior	Xbox 360	December 1, 2009	Rebellion Developments	
Quake Live	Windows	August 6, 2010	id Software	
Fallout: New Vegas	Windows	October 19, 2010	Obsidian Entertainment	
Fallout: New Vegas	PlayStation 3	October 19, 2010	Obsidian Entertainment	
Fallout: New Vegas	Xbox 360	October 19, 2010	Obsidian Entertainment	
Quake III Arena Arcade	Xbox 360	December 15, 2010	id Software	
Brink	Windows	May 10, 2011	Splash Damage	
Brink	PlayStation 3	May 10, 2011	Splash Damage	
Brink	Xbox 360	May 10, 2011	Splash Damage	
Hunted: The Demon's Forge	Windows	May 31, 2011	inXile Entertainment	
Hunted: The Demon's Forge	PlayStation 3	May 31, 2011	inXile Entertainment	
Hunted: The Demon's Forge	Xbox 360	May 31, 2011	inXile Entertainment	
Rage	OS X	October 4, 2011	id Software	
Rage	Windows	October 4, 2011	id Software	
Rage	PlayStation 3	October 4, 2011	id Software	
Rage	Xbox 360	October 4, 2011	id Software	
The Elder Scrolls V: Skyrim	Windows	November 11, 2011	Bethesda Game Studios	
The Elder Scrolls V: Skyrim	PlayStation 3	November 11, 2011	Bethesda Game Studios	
The Elder Scrolls V: Skyrim	Xbox 360	November 11, 2011	Bethesda Game Studios	
Dishonored	Windows	October 9, 2012	Arkane Studios	
Dishonored	PlayStation 3	October 9, 2012	Arkane Studios	
Dishonored	Xbox 360	October 9, 2012	Arkane Studios	
Dishonored	PlayStation 4	August 25, 2015 (Definitive Edition)	Arkane Studios	
Dishonored	Xbox One	August 25, 2015 (Definitive Edition)	Arkane Studios	
Doom 3: BFG Edition	Windows	October 16, 2012	id Software	
Doom 3: BFG Edition	PlayStation 3	October 16, 2012	id Software	
Doom 3: BFG Edition	Xbox 360	October 16, 2012	id Software	
Doom 3: BFG Edition	Nvidia Shield Tablet	June 4, 2015	Nvidia Lightspeed Studios	
Doom 3: BFG Edition	Nvidia Shield TV	June 4, 2015	Nvidia Lightspeed Studios	
Doom 3: BFG Edition	Nintendo Switch	July 26, 2019	Panic Button	
Doom 3: BFG Edition	PlayStation 4	July 26, 2019	Panic Button	
Doom 3: BFG Edition	Xbox One	July 26, 2019	Panic Button	
Doom (Re-release)	PlayStation 3	November 20, 2012	id Software	
Doom (Re-release)	PlayStation 4	July 26, 2019	Nerve Software	
Doom (Re-release)	Xbox One	July 26, 2019	Nerve Software	
Doom (Re-release)	Nintendo Switch	July 26, 2019	Nerve Software	
Doom (Re-release)	Android	July 26, 2019	Nerve Software	
Doom II (Re-release)	PlayStation 3	November 20, 2012	id Software	
Doom II (Re-release)	PlayStation 4	July 26, 2019	Nerve Software	
Doom II (Re-release)	Xbox One	July 26, 2019	Nerve Software	
Doom II (Re-release)	Nintendo Switch	July 26, 2019	Nerve Software	
Doom II (Re-release)	Android	July 26, 2019	Nerve Software	
Doom II (Re-release)	iOS	July 26, 2019	Nerve Software	
The Elder Scrolls Online	OS X	April 4, 2014	ZeniMax Online Studios	
The Elder Scrolls Online	Windows	April 4, 2014	ZeniMax Online Studios	
The Elder Scrolls Online	Stadia	June 16, 2020	ZeniMax Online Studios	
Wolfenstein: The New Order	Windows	May 20, 2014	MachineGames	
Wolfenstein: The New Order	PlayStation 3	May 20, 2014	MachineGames	
Wolfenstein: The New Order	PlayStation 4	May 20, 2014	MachineGames	
Wolfenstein: The New Order	Xbox 360	May 20, 2014	MachineGames	
Wolfenstein: The New Order	Xbox One	May 20, 2014	MachineGames	
The Evil Within	Windows	October 14, 2014	Tango Gameworks	
The Evil Within	PlayStation 3	October 14, 2014	Tango Gameworks	
The Evil Within	PlayStation 4	October 14, 2014	Tango Gameworks	
The Evil Within	Xbox 360	October 14, 2014	Tango Gameworks	
The Evil Within	Xbox One	October 14, 2014	Tango Gameworks	
Wolfenstein: The Old Blood	Windows	May 5, 2015	MachineGames	
Wolfenstein: The Old Blood	PlayStation 4	May 5, 2015	MachineGames	
Wolfenstein: The Old Blood	Xbox One	May 5, 2015	MachineGames	
The Elder Scrolls Online	PlayStation 4	June 9, 2015	ZeniMax Online Studios	
The Elder Scrolls Online	Xbox One	June 9, 2015	ZeniMax Online Studios	
Fallout Shelter	iOS	June 14, 2015	Bethesda Game Studios	
Fallout Shelter	Android	August 13, 2015	Bethesda Game Studios	
Fallout Shelter	Xbox One	February 7, 2017	Bethesda Game Studios	
Fallout 4	Windows	November 10, 2015	Bethesda Game Studios	
Fallout 4	PlayStation 4	November 10, 2015	Bethesda Game Studios	
Fallout 4	Xbox One	November 10, 2015	Bethesda Game Studios	
Doom	Windows	May 13, 2016	id Software	
Doom	PlayStation 4	May 13, 2016	id Software	
Doom	Xbox One	May 13, 2016	id Software	
Doom	Nintendo Switch	November 10, 2017	id Software	
Dishonored 2	Windows	November 11, 2016	Arkane Studios	
Dishonored 2	PlayStation 4	November 11, 2016	Arkane Studios	
Dishonored 2	Xbox One	November 11, 2016	Arkane Studios	
The Elder Scrolls: Legends	Windows	March 9, 2017	Dire Wolf Digital (2017–2018); Sparkypants Studios (2018–)	
The Elder Scrolls: Legends	macOS	May 31, 2017	Dire Wolf Digital (2017–2018); Sparkypants Studios (2018–)	
The Elder Scrolls: Legends	iOS	July 27, 2017	Dire Wolf Digital (2017–2018); Sparkypants Studios (2018–)	
The Elder Scrolls: Legends	Android	July 27, 2017	Dire Wolf Digital (2017–2018); Sparkypants Studios (2018–)	
Prey	Windows	May 5, 2017	Arkane Studios	
Prey	PlayStation 4	May 5, 2017	Arkane Studios	
Prey	Xbox One	May 5, 2017	Arkane Studios	
Quake Champions	Windows	August 22, 2017	id Software	
Dishonored: Death of the Outsider	Windows	September 15, 2017	Arkane Studios	
Dishonored: Death of the Outsider	PlayStation 4	September 15, 2017	Arkane Studios	
Dishonored: Death of the Outsider	Xbox One	September 15, 2017	Arkane Studios	
The Evil Within 2	Windows	October 13, 2017	Tango Gameworks	
The Evil Within 2	PlayStation 4	October 13, 2017	Tango Gameworks	
The Evil Within 2	Xbox One	October 13, 2017	Tango Gameworks	
Wolfenstein II: The New Colossus	Windows	October 27, 2017	MachineGames	
Wolfenstein II: The New Colossus	PlayStation 4	October 27, 2017	MachineGames	
Wolfenstein II: The New Colossus	Xbox One	October 27, 2017	MachineGames	
Wolfenstein II: The New Colossus	Nintendo Switch	June 29, 2018	MachineGames	
Fallout 76	Windows	November 14, 2018	Bethesda Game Studios	
Fallout 76	PlayStation 4	November 14, 2018	Bethesda Game Studios	
Fallout 76	Xbox One	November 14, 2018	Bethesda Game Studios	
The Elder Scrolls: Blades	iOS	March 27, 2019	Bethesda Game Studios	
The Elder Scrolls: Blades	Android	March 27, 2019	Bethesda Game Studios	
The Elder Scrolls: Blades	Nintendo Switch	May 14, 2020	Bethesda Game Studios	
Rage 2	Windows	May 14, 2019	Avalanche Studios and id Software	
Rage 2	PlayStation 4	May 14, 2019	Avalanche Studios and id Software	
Rage 2	Xbox One	May 14, 2019	Avalanche Studios and id Software	
Rage 2	Stadia	November 19, 2019	Avalanche Studios and id Software	
Wolfenstein: Youngblood	Windows	July 26, 2019	MachineGames and Arkane Studios	
Wolfenstein: Youngblood	PlayStation 4	July 26, 2019	MachineGames and Arkane Studios	
Wolfenstein: Youngblood	Xbox One	July 26, 2019	MachineGames and Arkane Studios	
Wolfenstein: Youngblood	Nintendo Switch	July 26, 2019	MachineGames and Arkane Studios	
Wolfenstein: Youngblood	Stadia	November 19, 2019	MachineGames and Arkane Studios	
Wolfenstein: Cyberpilot	HTC Vive	July 26, 2019	MachineGames and Arkane Studios	
Wolfenstein: Cyberpilot	PlayStation VR	July 26, 2019	MachineGames and Arkane Studios	
Doom Eternal	Stadia	March 20, 2020	id Software	
Doom Eternal	Windows	March 20, 2020	id Software	
Doom Eternal	PlayStation 4	March 20, 2020	id Software	
Doom Eternal	Xbox One	March 20, 2020	id Software	
Doom Eternal	Nintendo Switch	December 8, 2020	id Software	
Doom 64 (Remaster)	Windows	March 20, 2020	Nightdive Studios	
Doom 64 (Remaster)	PlayStation 4	March 20, 2020	Nightdive Studios	
Doom 64 (Remaster)	Xbox One	March 20, 2020	Nightdive Studios	
Doom 64 (Remaster)	Nintendo Switch	March 20, 2020	Nightdive Studios	
Quake (Remaster)	PlayStation 4	August 19, 2021	Nightdive Studios	
Quake (Remaster)	Xbox One	August 19, 2021	Nightdive Studios	
Quake (Remaster)	Nintendo Switch	August 19, 2021	Nightdive Studios	
Quake (Remaster)	PlayStation 5	October 12, 2021	Nightdive Studios	
Quake (Remaster)	Xbox Series X/S	October 12, 2021	Nightdive Studios	
Deathloop	PlayStation 5	September 14, 2021	Arkane Studios	
Deathloop	Windows	September 14, 2021	Arkane Studios	
Deathloop	Xbox Series X/S	September 20, 2022	Arkane Studios	
Ghostwire: Tokyo	PlayStation 5	March 25, 2022	Tango Gameworks	
Ghostwire: Tokyo	Windows	March 25, 2022	Tango Gameworks	
Ghostwire: Tokyo	Xbox Series X/S	April 12, 2023	Tango Gameworks	
Hi-Fi Rush	Xbox Series X/S	January 25, 2023	Tango Gameworks	
Hi-Fi Rush	Windows	January 25, 2023	Tango Gameworks	
Hi-Fi Rush	PlayStation 5	March 19, 2024	Tango Gameworks	
Mighty Doom	iOS	March 21, 2023	Alpha Dog Games	
Mighty Doom	Android	March 21, 2023	Alpha Dog Games	
Redfall	Xbox Series X/S	May 2, 2023	Arkane Studios	
Redfall	Windows	May 2, 2023	Arkane Studios	
Quake II (Remaster)	PlayStation 4	August 10, 2023	Nightdive Studios	
Quake II (Remaster)	Xbox One	August 10, 2023	Nightdive Studios	
Quake II (Remaster)	Nintendo Switch	August 10, 2023	Nightdive Studios	
Quake II (Remaster)	PlayStation 5	August 10, 2023	Nightdive Studios	
Quake II (Remaster)	Xbox Series X/S	August 10, 2023	Nightdive Studios	
Starfield	Windows	September 6, 2023	Bethesda Game Studios	
Starfield	Xbox Series X/S	September 6, 2023	Bethesda Game Studios	
Starfield	PlayStation 5	April 7, 2026	Bethesda Game Studios	
DOOM + DOOM II (Remaster)	Nintendo Switch	August 8, 2024	Nightdive Studios	
DOOM + DOOM II (Remaster)	PlayStation 4	August 8, 2024	Nightdive Studios	
DOOM + DOOM II (Remaster)	PlayStation 5	August 8, 2024	Nightdive Studios	
DOOM + DOOM II (Remaster)	Windows	August 8, 2024	Nightdive Studios	
DOOM + DOOM II (Remaster)	Xbox One	August 8, 2024	Nightdive Studios	
DOOM + DOOM II (Remaster)	Xbox Series X/S	August 8, 2024	Nightdive Studios	
The Elder Scrolls: Castles	iOS	September 10, 2024	Bethesda Game Studios	
The Elder Scrolls: Castles	Android	September 10, 2024	Bethesda Game Studios	
Indiana Jones and the Great Circle	Windows	December 9, 2024	MachineGames	
Indiana Jones and the Great Circle	Xbox Series X/S	December 9, 2024	MachineGames	
Indiana Jones and the Great Circle	PlayStation 5	April 17, 2025	MachineGames	
Indiana Jones and the Great Circle	Nintendo Switch 2	May 12, 2026	MachineGames	
The Elder Scrolls IV: Oblivion Remastered	Windows	April 22, 2025	Virtuos, Bethesda Game Studios	
The Elder Scrolls IV: Oblivion Remastered	Xbox Series X/S	April 22, 2025	Virtuos, Bethesda Game Studios	
The Elder Scrolls IV: Oblivion Remastered	PlayStation 5	April 22, 2025	Virtuos, Bethesda Game Studios	
The Elder Scrolls IV: Oblivion Remastered	Nintendo Switch 2	August 11, 2026	Virtuos, Bethesda Game Studios	
Doom: The Dark Ages	PlayStation 5	May 15, 2025	id Software	
Doom: The Dark Ages	Windows	May 15, 2025	id Software	
Doom: The Dark Ages	Xbox Series X/S	May 15, 2025	id Software	
Heretic + Hexen	Nintendo Switch	August 7, 2025	Id Software, Nightdive Studios	
Heretic + Hexen	PlayStation 4	August 7, 2025	Id Software, Nightdive Studios	
Heretic + Hexen	PlayStation 5	August 7, 2025	Id Software, Nightdive Studios	
Heretic + Hexen	Windows	August 7, 2025	Id Software, Nightdive Studios	
Heretic + Hexen	Xbox One	August 7, 2025	Id Software, Nightdive Studios	
Heretic + Hexen	Xbox Series X/S	August 7, 2025	Id Software, Nightdive Studios	
Grounded 2	PlayStation 5	2027	Obsidian Entertainment	
Grounded 2	Windows	2027	Obsidian Entertainment	
Grounded 2	Xbox Series X/S	2027	Obsidian Entertainment	
The Elder Scrolls VI: Sentinel	TBA	TBA	Bethesda Game Studios	
Fallout 5	TBA	TBA	Bethesda Game Studios	
Marvel's Blade	TBA	TBA	Arkane Studios	

== List of expansion packs ==
Title	Original game	System	Release date	Developer(s)	Ref.
The Elder Scrolls III: Tribunal	The Elder Scrolls III: Morrowind	Windows	November 6, 2002	Bethesda Game Studios	
The Elder Scrolls III: Bloodmoon	The Elder Scrolls III: Morrowind	Windows	June 3, 2003	Bethesda Game Studios	
The Elder Scrolls IV: Knights of the Nine	The Elder Scrolls IV: Oblivion	Windows	November 21, 2006	Bethesda Game Studios	
The Elder Scrolls IV: Knights of the Nine	The Elder Scrolls IV: Oblivion	Xbox 360	November 21, 2006	Bethesda Game Studios	
The Elder Scrolls IV: Knights of the Nine	The Elder Scrolls IV: Oblivion	PlayStation 3	March 20, 2007	Bethesda Game Studios	
The Elder Scrolls IV: Shivering Isles	The Elder Scrolls IV: Oblivion	Windows	October 16, 2007	Bethesda Game Studios	
The Elder Scrolls IV: Shivering Isles	The Elder Scrolls IV: Oblivion	Xbox 360	October 16, 2007	Bethesda Game Studios	
The Elder Scrolls IV: Shivering Isles	The Elder Scrolls IV: Oblivion	PlayStation 3	December 8, 2007	Bethesda Game Studios	
The Elder Scrolls V: Dawnguard	The Elder Scrolls V: Skyrim	Windows	August 2, 2012	Bethesda Game Studios	
The Elder Scrolls V: Dawnguard	The Elder Scrolls V: Skyrim	Xbox 360	June 26, 2012	Bethesda Game Studios	
The Elder Scrolls V: Dawnguard	The Elder Scrolls V: Skyrim	PlayStation 3	February 26, 2013	Bethesda Game Studios	
The Elder Scrolls V: Dragonborn	The Elder Scrolls V: Skyrim	Windows	February 5, 2013	Bethesda Game Studios	
The Elder Scrolls V: Dragonborn	The Elder Scrolls V: Skyrim	Xbox 360	December 4, 2012	Bethesda Game Studios	
The Elder Scrolls V: Dragonborn	The Elder Scrolls V: Skyrim	PlayStation 3	February 12, 2013	Bethesda Game Studios	
Far Harbor	Fallout 4	Windows	May 19, 2016	Bethesda Game Studios	
Far Harbor	Fallout 4	Xbox One	May 19, 2016	Bethesda Game Studios	
Far Harbor	Fallout 4	PlayStation 4	May 19, 2016	Bethesda Game Studios	
Nuka-World	Fallout 4	Windows	August 30, 2016	Bethesda Game Studios	
Nuka-World	Fallout 4	Xbox One	August 30, 2016	Bethesda Game Studios	
Nuka-World	Fallout 4	PlayStation 4	August 30, 2016	Bethesda Game Studios	
Shattered Space	Starfield	Windows	September 30, 2024	Bethesda Game Studios	
Shattered Space	Starfield	Xbox Series X/S	September 30, 2024	Bethesda Game Studios	
Shattered Space	Starfield	PlayStation 5	April 7, 2026	Bethesda Game Studios	
Terran Armada	Starfield	PlayStation 5	April 7, 2026	Bethesda Game Studios	
Terran Armada	Starfield	Windows	April 7, 2026	Bethesda Game Studios	
Terran Armada	Starfield	Xbox Series X/S	April 7, 2026	Bethesda Game Studios	

== List of downloadable content ==
Title	Original game	System	Release date	Developer(s)	Ref.
Operation: Anchorage	Fallout 3	Windows	January 27, 2009	Bethesda Game Studios	
Operation: Anchorage	Fallout 3	Xbox 360	January 27, 2009	Bethesda Game Studios	
Operation: Anchorage	Fallout 3	PlayStation 3	October 1, 2009	Bethesda Game Studios	
The Pitt	Fallout 3	Windows	March 25, 2009	Bethesda Game Studios	
The Pitt	Fallout 3	Xbox 360	March 25, 2009	Bethesda Game Studios	
The Pitt	Fallout 3	PlayStation 3	October 1, 2009	Bethesda Game Studios	
Broken Steel	Fallout 3	Windows	May 5, 2009	Bethesda Game Studios	
Broken Steel	Fallout 3	Xbox 360	May 5, 2009	Bethesda Game Studios	
Broken Steel	Fallout 3	PlayStation 3	September 24, 2009	Bethesda Game Studios	
Point Lookout	Fallout 3	Windows	June 23, 2009	Bethesda Game Studios	
Point Lookout	Fallout 3	Xbox 360	June 23, 2009	Bethesda Game Studios	
Point Lookout	Fallout 3	PlayStation 3	October 8, 2009	Bethesda Game Studios	
Mothership Zeta	Fallout 3	Windows	August 3, 2009	Bethesda Game Studios	
Mothership Zeta	Fallout 3	Xbox 360	August 3, 2009	Bethesda Game Studios	
Mothership Zeta	Fallout 3	PlayStation 3	October 8, 2009	Bethesda Game Studios	
Dead Money	Fallout: New Vegas	Xbox 360	December 21, 2010	Obsidian Entertainment	
Dead Money	Fallout: New Vegas	Windows	February 21, 2011	Obsidian Entertainment	
Dead Money	Fallout: New Vegas	PlayStation 3	February 21, 2011	Obsidian Entertainment	
Honest Hearts	Fallout: New Vegas	Windows	May 17, 2011	Obsidian Entertainment	
Honest Hearts	Fallout: New Vegas	Xbox 360	May 17, 2011	Obsidian Entertainment	
Honest Hearts	Fallout: New Vegas	PlayStation 3	June 2, 2011	Obsidian Entertainment	
Old World Blues	Fallout: New Vegas	Xbox 360	July 19, 2011	Obsidian Entertainment	
Old World Blues	Fallout: New Vegas	Windows	July 19, 2011	Obsidian Entertainment	
Old World Blues	Fallout: New Vegas	PlayStation 3	July 19, 2011	Obsidian Entertainment	
Lonesome Road	Fallout: New Vegas	Xbox 360	September 20, 2011	Obsidian Entertainment	
Lonesome Road	Fallout: New Vegas	Windows	September 20, 2011	Obsidian Entertainment	
Lonesome Road	Fallout: New Vegas	PlayStation 3	September 20, 2011	Obsidian Entertainment	
Gun Runners’ Arsenal	Fallout: New Vegas	Xbox 360	September 27, 2011	Obsidian Entertainment	
Gun Runners’ Arsenal	Fallout: New Vegas	Windows	September 27, 2011	Obsidian Entertainment	
Gun Runners’ Arsenal	Fallout: New Vegas	PlayStation 3	September 27, 2011	Obsidian Entertainment	
Courier's Stash	Fallout: New Vegas	Xbox 360	September 27, 2011	Obsidian Entertainment	
Courier's Stash	Fallout: New Vegas	Windows	September 27, 2011	Obsidian Entertainment	
Courier's Stash	Fallout: New Vegas	PlayStation 3	September 27, 2011	Obsidian Entertainment	
Hearthfire	The Elder Scrolls V: Skyrim	Xbox 360	September 4, 2012	Bethesda Game Studios	
Hearthfire	The Elder Scrolls V: Skyrim	Windows	October 5, 2012	Bethesda Game Studios	
Hearthfire	The Elder Scrolls V: Skyrim	PlayStation 3	February 19, 2013	Bethesda Game Studios	
The Knife of Dunwall	Dishonored	Windows	April 16, 2013	Arkane Studios	
The Knife of Dunwall	Dishonored	Xbox 360	April 16, 2013	Arkane Studios	
The Knife of Dunwall	Dishonored	PlayStation 3	April 16, 2013	Arkane Studios	
The Brigmore Witches	Dishonored	Windows	August 13, 2013	Arkane Studios	
The Brigmore Witches	Dishonored	Xbox 360	August 13, 2013	Arkane Studios	
The Brigmore Witches	Dishonored	PlayStation 3	August 13, 2013	Arkane Studios	
The Assignment	The Evil Within	Windows	March 10, 2015	Tango Gameworks	
The Assignment	The Evil Within	Xbox One	March 10, 2015	Tango Gameworks	
The Assignment	The Evil Within	PlayStation 4	March 10, 2015	Tango Gameworks	
The Consequence	The Evil Within	Windows	April 21, 2015	Tango Gameworks	
The Consequence	The Evil Within	Xbox One	April 21, 2015	Tango Gameworks	
The Consequence	The Evil Within	PlayStation 4	April 21, 2015	Tango Gameworks	
The Executioner	The Evil Within	Windows	May 26, 2015	Tango Gameworks	
The Executioner	The Evil Within	Xbox One	May 26, 2015	Tango Gameworks	
The Executioner	The Evil Within	PlayStation 4	May 26, 2015	Tango Gameworks	
Automatron	Fallout 4	Windows	March 22, 2016	Bethesda Game Studios	
Automatron	Fallout 4	Xbox One	March 22, 2016	Bethesda Game Studios	
Automatron	Fallout 4	PlayStation 4	March 22, 2016	Bethesda Game Studios	
Wasteland Workshop	Fallout 4	Windows	April 12, 2016	Bethesda Game Studios	
Wasteland Workshop	Fallout 4	Xbox One	April 12, 2016	Bethesda Game Studios	
Wasteland Workshop	Fallout 4	PlayStation 4	April 12, 2016	Bethesda Game Studios	
Contraptions Workshop	Fallout 4	Windows	June 21, 2016	Bethesda Game Studios	
Contraptions Workshop	Fallout 4	Xbox One	June 21, 2016	Bethesda Game Studios	
Contraptions Workshop	Fallout 4	PlayStation 4	June 21, 2016	Bethesda Game Studios	
Vault-Tec Workshop	Fallout 4	Windows	July 26, 2016	Bethesda Game Studios	
Vault-Tec Workshop	Fallout 4	Xbox One	July 26, 2016	Bethesda Game Studios	
Vault-Tec Workshop	Fallout 4	PlayStation 4	July 26, 2016	Bethesda Game Studios	
The Freedom Chronicles: Episode Zero	Wolfenstein II: The New Colossus	Windows	November 17, 2017	MachineGames	
The Freedom Chronicles: Episode Zero	Wolfenstein II: The New Colossus	Xbox One	November 17, 2017	MachineGames	
The Freedom Chronicles: Episode Zero	Wolfenstein II: The New Colossus	PlayStation 4	November 17, 2017	MachineGames	
The Freedom Chronicles: Episode 1	Wolfenstein II: The New Colossus	Windows	December 14, 2017	MachineGames	
The Freedom Chronicles: Episode 1	Wolfenstein II: The New Colossus	Xbox One	December 14, 2017	MachineGames	
The Freedom Chronicles: Episode 1	Wolfenstein II: The New Colossus	PlayStation 4	December 14, 2017	MachineGames	
The Freedom Chronicles: Episode 2	Wolfenstein II: The New Colossus	Windows	January 30, 2018	MachineGames	
The Freedom Chronicles: Episode 2	Wolfenstein II: The New Colossus	Xbox One	January 30, 2018	MachineGames	
The Freedom Chronicles: Episode 2	Wolfenstein II: The New Colossus	PlayStation 4	January 30, 2018	MachineGames	
The Freedom Chronicles: Episode 3	Wolfenstein II: The New Colossus	Windows	March 13, 2018	MachineGames	
The Freedom Chronicles: Episode 3	Wolfenstein II: The New Colossus	Xbox One	March 13, 2018	MachineGames	
The Freedom Chronicles: Episode 3	Wolfenstein II: The New Colossus	PlayStation 4	March 13, 2018	MachineGames	
Mooncrash	Prey	Windows	June 10, 2018	Arkane Studios	
Mooncrash	Prey	Xbox One	June 10, 2018	Arkane Studios	
Mooncrash	Prey	PlayStation 4	June 10, 2018	Arkane Studios	
Rise of the Ghosts	Rage 2	Windows	September 26, 2019	Avalanche Studios and id Software	
Rise of the Ghosts	Rage 2	Xbox One	September 26, 2019	Avalanche Studios and id Software	
Rise of the Ghosts	Rage 2	PlayStation 4	September 26, 2019	Avalanche Studios and id Software	
TerrorMania	Rage 2	Windows	November 14, 2019	Avalanche Studios and id Software	
TerrorMania	Rage 2	Xbox One	November 14, 2019	Avalanche Studios and id Software	
TerrorMania	Rage 2	PlayStation 4	November 14, 2019	Avalanche Studios and id Software	
The Ancient Gods: Part One	Doom Eternal	Windows	October 20, 2020	id Software	
The Ancient Gods: Part One	Doom Eternal	Stadia	October 20, 2020	id Software	
The Ancient Gods: Part One	Doom Eternal	Xbox One	October 20, 2020	id Software	
The Ancient Gods: Part One	Doom Eternal	PlayStation 4	October 20, 2020	id Software	
The Ancient Gods: Part One	Doom Eternal	Nintendo Switch	June 15, 2021	id Software	
The Ancient Gods: Part Two	Doom Eternal	Windows	March 18, 2021	id Software	
The Ancient Gods: Part Two	Doom Eternal	Stadia	March 18, 2021	id Software	
The Ancient Gods: Part Two	Doom Eternal	Xbox One	March 18, 2021	id Software	
The Ancient Gods: Part Two	Doom Eternal	PlayStation 4	March 18, 2021	id Software	
The Ancient Gods: Part Two	Doom Eternal	Nintendo Switch	August 26, 2021	id Software	
The Order Of Giants	Indiana Jones and the Great Circle	Windows	September 4, 2025	MachineGames	
The Order Of Giants	Indiana Jones and the Great Circle	Xbox Series X/S	September 4, 2025	MachineGames	
The Order Of Giants	Indiana Jones and the Great Circle	PlayStation 5	September 4, 2025	MachineGames	
Revelations	Doom: The Dark Ages	Windows	July 7, 2026	id Software	
Revelations	Doom: The Dark Ages	Xbox Series X/S	July 7, 2026	id Software	
Revelations	Doom: The Dark Ages	PlayStation 5	July 7, 2026	id Software	

== Other Games ==
=== Hockey League Simulator ===
Hockey League Simulator is a hockey game released by Bethesda Softworks in 1989.

=== Family Card Games Fun Pack ===
Family Card Games Fun Pack is a card game developed by Mud Duck Productions for the PlayStation. The game allows players to compete against computer-controlled opponents in tournaments.

== See also ==
- List of canceled Bethesda Softworks games
