= List of canceled Bethesda Softworks games =

Video game publisher Bethesda Softworks has had several video games that were in development but were later canceled.

== Terminator Dawn ==
After Skynet, Bethesda was working on another Terminator game called Terminator Dawn. Todd Howard was doing design on Dawn and it would involve the player playing as the Terminator.Terminator Dawn never got off the ground due to rights issues and Bethesda doing other projects.

== Untitled Pensacola: Wings of Gold video games ==
In 1997, Bethesda partnered with CBS Enterprises to produce companion video games for the television series Pensacola: Wings of Gold. Bethesda would use storylines, sets, footage and stars of the television series--including James Brolin to recreate onscreen action in an interactive medium using sophisticated 3-D graphics and actual footage from the TV series.

The first Pensacola CD-ROM game was to be released in November 1997, along with plans for an online version of the game. By December 1997, the project was still in development.

== The 10th Planet ==
The 10th Planet was a space combat game that was in development as a joint project between Bethesda and Centropolis Entertainment. According to Todd Howard, the game never made past pre-production.

== Skip Barber Racing ==
Skip Barber Racing was a racing game that was in development by Bethesda, with Brent Erickson being the game's lead designer. After a delay into 2000 caused by the company going through some changes in structure with ZeniMax, resources were then redirected to other projects due to a lack of interest from upper management. Brent Erickson decided to leave Bethesda and his team in Washington was disbanded.

== The Elder Scrolls Travels: Oblivion ==
The Elder Scrolls Travels: Oblivion was a cancelled PlayStation Portable adaptation of The Elder Scrolls IV: Oblivion that was being developed by Climax Studios. The game was never released.

== Prey 2 ==
Prey 2 was a first-person shooter that was in development by Human Head Studios with Bethesda Softworks as the publisher. According to a report from IGN, Human Head ceased development on the game in late 2011 due to a failed buyout attempt by ZeniMax.

== BattleCry ==
BattleCry was a multiplayer video game that was in development by BattleCry Studios. BattleCry Studios was a studio founded in 2012 by ZeniMax Media that was to be headed by Rich Vogel. It was to use Crytek's CryEngine. BattleCry was canceled in late 2015 with Bethesda citing concers about whether it is meeting the objectives they had for it.

== Commander Keen mobile ==
Commander Keen was a game that was being developed by ZeniMax Online Studios for IOS and Android. The game was seemingly scrapped in June 2020, with almost all traces of its official social media presence being gone, and was also pulled from ZeniMax's website.

== Blackbird ==
Blackbird was a sci-fi Massively multiplayer online game that was in development by ZeniMax Online Studios. Development on Blackbird began in 2018 with a projected release date of 2028. The project was canceled in 2025 following layoffs at Microsoft.

== See also ==
- List of Bethesda Softworks video games
