= Golf Magazine: 36 Great Holes Starring Fred Couples =

1995 video game

Golf Magazine Presents 36 Great Holes Starring Fred Couples
- Developer: Flashpoint Productions
- Publisher: Sega
- Producer: Michael Meischeid
- Designers: Guy Carver; Brent Erickson; Shaun Mitchell
- Artist: Shaun Mitchell
- Composers: Ron Saltmarsh; Andy Warr
- Platform: 32X
- Release: 1995
- Genre: Sports

Golf Magazine Presents 36 Great Holes Starring Fred Couples is a golf video game for the 32X. The game features Fred Couples on the cover and is sponsored by Golf Magazine. It was released in 1995 in Japan, North America, and Europe. The game received mixed reviews.

== Gameplay ==
A golfer in Golf Magazine: 36 Great Holes Starring Fred Couples about to take a swing

Players are given a variety of options for play, including selection of clubs, clothing their golfing character wears, and in which order the holes are played. During play, golfers are viewed from behind. Swinging a golf club in the game require three button presses: players must select a shot type and a club, then position the shot. A button press initiates the swing on a power meter that rises and falls; pressing the button again swings at the level of power at which the meter is stopped. During the setup for the swing, players can look at the map of the hole and adjust their stance to change the swing.

== Development ==
The game was in development as early as July 1994.

== Reception ==
Reception

Review scores
Publication	Score
Computer and Video Games	89/100
Electronic Gaming Monthly	6.5/10
Famitsu	23/40
GamePro	3.5/5
M! Games	78%
Mega Fun	77%
Next Generation	3/5
Video Games (DE)	71%
Mean Machines Sega	73/100
Sega Saturn Magazine	7.0/10

Golf Magazine: 36 Great Holes Starring Fred Couples received mixed reviews. In Japan, Famitsu gave the game a score of 23 out of 40. Reviewers for GamePro recommended the game "for thinking golfers who love to experiment", praising the wide range of options and the detailed course graphics, though they criticized the difficult shooting controls and the unclear overhead maps. A reviewer for Next Generation, while assessing it as a decent golf simulation with good features, concluded that Golf Magazine Presents 36 Great Holes Starring Fred Couples "is just another golf sim without the depth of EA's PGA series, and, to top it off, the graphics just aren't that impressive for a 32-bit game. The only thing here that hasn't been seen before is the massive 15 syllable title." He gave it three out of five stars. Two reviewers for Mean Machines Sega scored the game 73 points out of 100, identifying little difference between it and PGA games. Computer and Video Games was more positive, scoring the game 89 points out of 100, with the reviewer calling the game "superior to just about any other title in the genre."

== See also ==
- PGA Tour Golf III
