= The Elder Scrolls Travels: Oblivion =

Cancelled video game

- Developer: Climax Studios
- Publisher: ZeniMax Media
- Producer: Laffy Taylor
- Platform: PlayStation Portable
- Genre: Role-playing
- Mode: Single-player

The Elder Scrolls Travels: Oblivion was a cancelled PlayStation Portable adaptation of The Elder Scrolls IV: Oblivion that was being developed by Climax Studios. It would have been the fifth instalment in The Elder Scrolls Travels sub-series, which is a collection of smaller, portable adaptations of The Elder Scrolls games. It was announced in November 2006, with its release date planned for Spring 2007. The game was cancelled around August 2007, though no official statement was ever made.

Most known information about the game comes from statements made by Todd Howard (executive producer of The Elder Scrolls IV: Oblivion) and Laffy Taylor (producer of The Elder Scrolls Travels: Oblivion) in Official U.S. PlayStation Magazine.

== Plot ==
The Elder Scrolls Travels: Oblivion was intended to have its own story and setting. It would share similarities with the story of the mainline game, such as the focus on the threat of Oblivion gates and Daedra. The events of the PSP version were to be occurring roughly during the same time period as the mainline game.

== Gameplay ==
Rather than being a direct port of the original game, it was supposed to be its own standalone title, likely due to the handheld's technical limitations. The PSP version would share many similarities with the original game, such as gameplay and mechanics, but would contain its own unique story and setting.

Rather than being an open world role-playing game, the spin-off was described more as a dungeon crawler that would consist of ten levels across five regions. Each area would resemble parts from the original game, just in a more condensed format for the limited hardware.

It was planned to have 18 of the 21 skills originally featured in the main game, also containing a similar progression system, where points would be allocated into attributes, while skills would be increased through gameplay.

== Development ==
The game was announced in November 2006 via the Official U.S. PlayStation Magazine, with its release scheduled for Spring 2007.

Development was handled by Climax Studios, who had past experience working with the PlayStation Portable on titles such as Silent Hill: Origins and Silent Hill: Shattered Memories, both of which were praised for their technical prowess. Publishing of the game would have been handled mostly by ZeniMax Media, while Ubisoft would have handled co-publishing in UK & EU regions.

== Leak ==
In 2016, videos surfaced online showing gameplay footage of an early build of the game despite it never being officially released.
