= Velian =

Velian may refer to:

- Velian, Alborz, a village in Alborz Province, Iran
- Velian Hill, a hill of Rome
- Operation: Matriarchy, a computer game
