= Echelon (2001 video game) =

- Developer: MADia Entertainment
- Publishers: CIS: Buka Entertainment; WW: Bethesda Softworks
- Platform: Windows
- Release: RU: March 21, 2001; NA: May 11, 2001; UK: September 28, 2001; Wind Warriors: RU: October 24, 2002; UK: November 14, 2003; NA: February 9, 2004
- Genres: Action, simulation
- Modes: Single-player, multiplayer

Echelon (Russian: «Шторм») is a 3-D science fiction flight simulator video game developed by Saint Petersburg developers MADia Entertainment. It was published in Russia by Buka Entertainment, and in all other territories by Bethesda Softworks.

== Gameplay ==
Screenshot of gameplay

It involves flying futuristic fighters in combat scenarios. The game can be played locally or on a local area network with up to 32 players. The Russian version of the game is called "Шторм" ("Storm"). Operation: Matriarchy (also developed by MADia) takes place in the same continuity as Echelon.

== Plot ==
In the game, you decide the fate of the entire Galactic Federation. The aggressors from the planet Velian, having new weapons that make them almost invincible, are trying to destroy the Federation and capture all of its colonies. The Velians are ruthless to those who are trying to get in their way. They calmly burn entire planets if they show resistance. The player will have to go from the cadet of the Training Center of the Air Force of the Federation to one of the best Air Force aces, who is assigned the most difficult tasks.

== Development ==
The game went gold on April 26, 2001. The game was originally called Storm but that name later proved unavailable. Pete Hines (Bethesda's director of marketing and public relations) and Bethesda's Todd Vaughn were given the task of renaming the game. One morning Todd came to Hine's desk and said, 'How about Echelon?' They liked the military reference and it just sounded cool, so they went with it, hoping there would be no conflicts. The name idea was sent to Brent Erickson, who was VP of development at Bethesda West the company's subsidiary that developed the Bethesda racing titles for a number of years. Erickson liked the name.

== Reception ==
Echelon

Aggregate score
Aggregator	Score
Metacritic	70/100

Review scores
Publication	Score
Computer Gaming World	3.5/5
Eurogamer	7/10
Game Informer	9/10
GameRevolution	C
GameSpot	7/10
GameSpy	7/10
GameStar	48%
GameZone	7.5/10
IGN	7.2/10
Jeuxvideo.com	13/20
Next Generation	3/5
PC Gamer (US)	91%

Echelon received "mixed or average reviews" according to the review aggregation website Metacritic. Steve Butts of IGN said, "In all Echelon is a very welcome addition to the flight sim genre. It takes an approach that most other developers have neglected. Still, the execution and design aren't entirely up to the possibility of the concept. You'll play it, you'll enjoy and, ultimately, put it aside for more traditional games that offer a lot more sparkle." GameSpot said, "In spite of its problems, Echelon does hit close enough to the mark to offer some fast and flashy, but ultimately shallow, thrills." However, Jim Preston of NextGen said of the game, "Credit to Buka for trying to combine two genres, but predictably it neither soars nor crashes."

=== Awards ===
The game was a runner-up for "Sci-Fi Simulation Game of the Year" at GameSpot's Readers' Choice Awards 2001.

== Controversy ==
There was controversy regarding the U.S release of the game in which Bethesda refused to pay MADia for boxed sales of the game.
