= TKO Software =

American video game developer (2002–2005)

TKO Software was a video game developer founded in 2002 in Santa Cruz, California, United States by Jacob Hawley and Michael Songy.

TKO Software created Medal of Honor: Allied Assault: Breakthrough (2003) and the multiplayer portion of Medal of Honor: Pacific Assault (2004), both for Electronic Arts. The company created content for EA's GoldenEye: Rogue Agent, and multiple mobile and handheld titles, including The Elder Scrolls Travels: Shadowkey for Nokia's N-Gage and mobile versions of Tenchu, X-Men 2: Battle, Gauntlet and an adventure game based on the movie The Hitchhiker's Guide to the Galaxy.

The company was working on video games based upon the 2005 film Sahara, and upon Logan's Run.

In 2004, TKO Software sold back the multiplayer rights of Ashen Empires to refocus on its core business.

In January 2005 TKO Software shut down its PC and console games development studio, located in Santa Cruz, leading to the loss of around 60 jobs. The rest of the company's studios closed down shortly afterwards in August 2005.

== Titles ==
- Ashen Empires
- Medal of Honor: Allied Assault Breakthrough
- Leisure Suit Larry: Pocket Party
- The Elder Scrolls Travels: Shadowkey
- Gauntlet (mobile version)
- Knuckle-Up!
- Tenchu: Wrath of Heaven
- X-Men 2: Battle
