= Fork Particle =

Computer graphics visual effects modeling and software development kit

- Developers: Fork Particle, Inc.
- Stable release: 6
- Operating system: Windows, macOS Linux, PlayStation 3, PlayStation 4, Xbox 360, Xbox One
- Type: Game middleware

Fork Particle is a computer graphics visual effects modeling and software development kit (SDK) developed and sold by Fork Particle, Inc. Fork Particle uses its real time particle system technology to simulate visual effects or particle effects such as CGI explosions, fire, rain, smoke, dust, etc. Fork Particle is used in video games and visual simulation software such as a flight simulator. It has been licensed to game developers for Windows, macOS, Linux, PlayStation 3, PlayStation 4, Xbox 360 and Xbox One.

Notable Fork Particle licensees include Ubisoft, Trickstar Games, Firaxis Games, ZeniMax Online Studios, Electronic Arts, Microsoft, LEGO, and Sony. Video games that have utilized Fork Particle’s technology include The Elder Scrolls Online, Sid Meier's Civilization: Beyond Earth, Rocksmith 2014 Edition, Empire Earth III, LEGO Universe, Splosion Man, Sid Meier's Civilization V and Sid Meier's Civilization VI.

== Fork Particle SDK ==
Fork Particle's real time technology component or particle engine is meant to be integrated and used with a video game engine or computer graphics engine. Particle effects are authored by VFX artists or designers using Fork Particle’s effects modeling tool and then brought into the user’s 3D computer graphics environment or 2D computer graphics environment where these particle effects are simulated by Fork Particle’s engine in real time and displayed by the user application’s graphics engine.

The Fork Particle SDK includes these components: real time particle engine (Fork Runtime SDK), particle editor or modeling tool (Fork Particle Studio), live update for in application particle effects editing (Fork Live Tuner), and particle effects definitions batch file exporter.

== Technology partners ==
Fork Particle also includes incorporation or integrations with partner technologies:

- Microsoft Xbox 360
- Microsoft Xbox One
- Sony PlayStation 3
- Sony PlayStation 4
- Havok Physics
- Havok Vision Engine
- Emergent Gamebryo LightSpeed
- Perforce SCM
- Autodesk FBX
- NVidia PhysX
- Android
- Apple
- Intel (Multi-core processor support)
