= All Star Racing 2 =

2003 video game

- European packaging artwork
- Developer(s): Kung Fu Games
- Publisher(s): NA: Mud Duck Productions; EU: Midas Interactive Entertainment
- Platform(s): PlayStation
- Release: NA: April 24, 2003; PAL: February 7, 2003
- Genre(s): Racing
- Mode(s): Single-player, multiplayer

All Star Racing 2 is a racing game for the PlayStation. It was developed by Kung Fu Games and published in North America by Mud Duck Productions and in Europe by Midas Interactive Entertainment. It is the sequel to All Star Racing which released in 2002.

== Gameplay ==
The game contains multiple vehicles and five tracks. It also has multiple viewpoints and three levels of difficulty.

== Reception ==
Reception

Review scores
Publication	Score
All Game Guide	2.5/5
PSX Nation	59%
PlanetStation	3.5/10

PSX Nation said "All Star Racing 2” wastes its potential for being a cool 4-in-1 racing hybrid with generic graphics and a shallow physics model".
