= IHRA Drag Racing: Multiplayer =

- Developer: Vir2L Studios
- Publisher: Mforma
- Series: IHRA Drag Racing
- Platforms: J2ME; BREW
- Release: June 2003
- Genre: Racing

IHRA Drag Racing: Multiplayer is a 2003 video game developed by Vir2L Studios and co-published by Mforma for wireless devices.

== Gameplay ==
The player selects a car, enters a straight drag strip, revs the engine by pressing up briefly, then accelerates by tapping up and shifting with the OK button while using left and right inputs to keep the vehicle aligned; drifting into the other lane causes disqualification, hitting the wall ends the run, and crossing the finish line requires pressing OK again to deploy a parachute, with some versions also offering a shop to purchase upgrades using points earned from races.

== Development ==
IHRA Drag Racing: Multiplayer was announced in February 2003. The title was co-published by Mforma with Bethesda Softworks and Vir2L Studios and Mforma was the worldwide distributor. It was released in June 2003.

== Reception ==
Reception

Review scores
Publication	Score
IGN	4/10
Wireless Gaming Review	4.2/10

IGN called IHRA Drag Racing: Multiplayer dull and boring. Wireless Gaming Review found IHRA Drag Racing: Multiplayer to be an uninteresting gaming experience.
