= IHRA Drag Racing =

- Genre: Racing
- Developers: Digital Dialect (2000); Bethesda Softworks (2001); Super Happy Fun Fun (2003); Vir2L Studios (2003); Bethesda Game Studios (2004, 2006)
- Publisher: Bethesda Softworks
- Platforms: Windows, PlayStation, PlayStation 2, Xbox

IHRA Drag Racing is a series of racing video games about drag racing published by Bethesda Softworks, and developed in collaboration with the International Hot Rod Association (IHRA).

== Games ==
- IHRA Motorsports (2000, PC)
- IHRA Drag Racing (2001, PS1, PC)
- IHRA Drag Racing 2 (2002, PS2)
- IHRA Drag Racing: Multiplayer (2003, J2ME/BREW)
- IHRA Drag Racing 2004 (2003, Xbox)
- IHRA Professional Drag Racing 2005 (2004, PC/PS2/Xbox)
- IHRA Drag Racing: Sportsman Edition (2006, PC/PS2/Xbox)

== Development ==
The games were developed by Bethesda West, formerly known as Flashpoint Productions.
