= The Elder Scrolls Travels: Stormhold =

2003 video game

- Developer: Vir2L Studios
- Publishers: Vir2L Studios; Mforma
- Series: The Elder Scrolls Travels
- Platforms: J2ME, BREW
- Release: July 2003
- Genre: Role-playing
- Mode: Single-player

The Elder Scrolls Travels: Stormhold is a 2003 role-playing game from Vir2L Studios.

== Gameplay ==
The Elder Scrolls Travels: Stormhold is a game which takes in the same universe as the Morrowind series. Players explore a land filled with horrible monsters from a first-person perspective. The action RPG takes players into hazardous catacombs and dungeons, where they must face fearsome beasts guarding valuable treasures. Stormhold is set in a prison ruled by the tyrant Quintus Varis. As a captive, players must find allies among their fellow prisoners. By forming the right friendships and gaining enough experience, they can become strong enough to overthrow the brutal warden.

== Development ==
The Elder Scrolls Travels: Stormhold was developed by Vir2L Studios and co-published by both Vir2L and Mforma. It was released in July 2003 for J2ME and BREW-enabled wireless handsets and to subscribers of Cingular Wireless and AT&T; Wireless.

== Reception ==
Reception

Review scores
Publication	Score
Level	2/5
Wireless Gaming Review	8/10
XS Magazine	4.5/5

XS Magazine gave the game a rating of 4.5 out of 5 and said the game is more similar to the Might and Magic series than older Elder Scrolls games. They praised the wealth of content in the game. Level gave a rating of 2 out of 5 and called the graphics very good for a game of its type. They criticized the lack of typical Elder Scrolls features like cities and extensive dialogue options with NPCs.
