= Noctropolis =

1994 video game

- Developer: Flashpoint Productions
- Publisher: Electronic Arts
- Producer: Roland Kippenhan III
- Designers: Brent Erickson; Shaun Mitchell
- Programmer: Colin McLaughlan
- Artist: Shaun Mitchell
- Composers: Ron Saltmarsh; Andy Warr
- Platforms: MS-DOS; Microsoft Windows; Linux macOS
- Release: MS-DOS; December 1994; Microsoft Windows; 3 September 2015; Linux, macOS; 27 October 2017
- Genre: Adventure game
- Mode: Single-player

Noctropolis is a 1994 MS-DOS third-person adventure game by Flashpoint Productions and published by Electronic Arts. The player assumes the role of the character Peter Grey, a lonely bookstore owner who winds up in the world of his favorite comic book. Grey discovers that he is destined to assume the role of his former comic book hero.

== Gameplay ==
This style of gameplay is mostly third-person point-and-click, with some cut scenes. The player not only has to locate items but carefully choose dialog to gather information to help them progress through the game.

Characters in the game were digitized from analog footage, allowing for real life characters to be placed in 2D digital environments.

== Reception ==
Reception

Review scores
Publication	Score
Computer Gaming World	2.5/5
Next Generation	4/5
Albuquerque Journal	4/5

Charles Ardai of Computer Gaming World, while approving of the game's visual style and detailed art, criticized that the game has a simplistic interface and uses juvenile shock value in the form of gratuitous violence and sexual content in order to distract from the lack of substance to the story. He added, "It's also highly derivative, both of actual comic books and of other computer games." A reviewer for Next Generation highly praised the game's story, abstract and challenging puzzles, comic-book style backgrounds, digitized character animation, soundtrack, and dark atmosphere. Though he remarked that some of the dialogue is silly for a Mature-rated game, and that many of the puzzles require illogical leaps of intuition, he concluded that "Those not requiring the utmost in realism will find this to be one of the best graphic adventures of the season."

== Legacy ==
In 2015 Night Dive Studios acquired the rights of the game and was able to recover the source code from the original developer. The game's assembly code was ported with the help of the original developer to C++ to port the game to modern platforms. On 3 September 2015, the enhanced port was released on Steam, on 21 January 2016 followed a release on the DRM-free distributor GOG.com. The remastered game features full compatibility with contemporary computers, a remastered soundtrack, improved keyboard/mouse support with rebindable keys/buttons and several bug fixes, and removed dead-end situations that would render the game unwinnable. Night Dive Studios released Linux and macOS versions of its port on 27 October 2017. Players who pirated a copy of this version of Noctropolis will see their character imprisoned on the game over screen instead of the standard animations.
