= Medieval Games =

2009 video game

- Developer(s): N-Fusion Interactive
- Publisher(s): Vir2L Studios
- Platform(s): Wii
- Release: NA: October 20, 2009; AU: November 19, 2009; EU: November 27, 2009
- Genre(s): Party
- Mode(s): Single-player, multiplayer

Medieval Games is a party video game developed by American studio n-Fusion Interactive and published by Vir2L Studios for Nintendo's Wii console. It was developed by N-Fusion and was unveiled in December 2008. It was released on October 20, 2009 in North America and on November 27 in Europe.

== Gameplay ==
Medieval Games is a party video game set in a storybook medieval world. The game is similar to the Mario Party series by Nintendo. The game has a story mode with a story based on the Middle Ages, in which you play as a court jester named Scrunth, with each chapter raising Scrunth in the social hierarchy, with the last chapter he is named King of the Fools. The game features 30 Medieval mini-games including sword fighting, jousting, archery and catapulting. The game supports up to 4-player local multiplayer. The game aims to take full advantage of the Wii's motion capabilities. Most of the actions on the game-boards and mini-games requires motion-controls. It also has 2 vs 2 and 1 vs 3 minigames where player 1 is always the solo.

== Reception ==
IGN played four minigames at E3 2009 and wrote in a preview: "Without anything else to base an opinion on, I can only hope the other promised 27 games don't share the same basic, often-lacking controls and thirty-second playtimes. But my hopes aren't high." In a Gamescom 2009 preview IGN played some of the minigames and called them "mildly amusing". Common Sense Media said that the control-scheme could only be enjoyed by an ogre, and was generally negative towards the game. News Shopper wrote: "In short this is tongue-in-cheek fun and ideal fodder for the Wii. It may not look a million groats but who cares when it is this much fun."
