= Ashen Empires =

2003 video game

- Developers: Doug Gesler (Zarquon), David Reese, Jeremy Mappus, Bill Money (OneEye), Denis Loubet
- Publishers: Pixel Mine(current), Iron Will Games (former), Asylumsoft Inc. (original), TKO Software (former)
- Platform: Microsoft Windows
- Release: March 10, 2003
- Genre: Massively multiplayer online role-playing game
- Mode: Multiplayer

Ashen Empires is a two-dimensional massively multiplayer online role-playing game created by American developer Jason "Lothgar" Ely and now owned by Iron Will Games. It was released for a free, open beta in 2002 and later officially released in 2003.

== Origins ==
The original Dransik game, now known as Dransik Classic, was built in honor of Ultima V by Jason Ely, one of the U8 developers and Doug Gesler. Its graphics resemble the tileset used in that game, but in SVGA. Dransik Classic is still available for play using the Pixel Mine launcher. The modern game was originally known as Dransik, and was an upgraded version of the original Dransik game, which utilized an older graphics engine. The game was first launched through an open, free beta in September, 2002, by its original publisher, Asylumsoft Inc.. After the beta-testing stage was complete, the game started following a pay-to-play model on March 10, 2003. Dec 16, 2003 Asylumsoft sold the assets of the game to TKO Software and the game was renamed to Ashen Empires. 2004 TKO Software Sold the multiplayer rights back to Iron Will Games.

At that time, a monthly subscription fee was required to play (a business model seen in many MMORPG's, including World of Warcraft and EverQuest). Iron Will Games later decided to allow users to play for free, but with a limited experience. Until early 2008, players could only receive 10% of all experience gained, were limited in tradeskills they can use and couldn't perform certain tasks such as using the party system, trade table, pickup and drop objects/items to the ground or loot certain mobs. In early 2008, these restrictions were relaxed so that: non-subscribing players now receive 50% of all experience gained; can party with other non-subscribers; can table trade freely with other non-subscribers; can table trade with subscribers but only to receive, not give items.

In 2009, subscriptions were ended and the game became free to play, but added a pay system to earn in-game bonuses. In June 2020 an update added a Questlog to the Game.

In Sept 2022 Ashen Empires and Dransik Release on Steam.

== Character creation ==
Accounts on Ashen Empires are able to contain up to four characters per server. When creating a character, the player can choose one of three races: human, night elf (also known as Astari), or Orc.

There is a total of seventy-one skills in the game; these skills include armed and unarmed combat, magery (spellcasting), and trade skills. Specific examples include Mining, Iron Forging, Baking, Planting, Harvesting, and Large Blades.

== Reception ==
In a 2006 review, Blair Morris of OMGN praised the game, "Ashen Empires is a high quality game that every MMORPG fan should try." Among the praise was the world, the gameplay and the welcoming community.

A 2011 review by Beau Hindman further noted the aged system and the complex and confusing aspects of the game. Ashen Empires has no quest tracking function; and requires the player to keep track of the quests and information manually.
