= Skip Barber Racing School =

Racing school

- Founded: 1975; 51 years ago
- Founder: Skip Barber
- Owner: Anthony DeMonte

The Skip Barber Racing School is an American racing and driving school. Skip Barber founded the school in 1975.

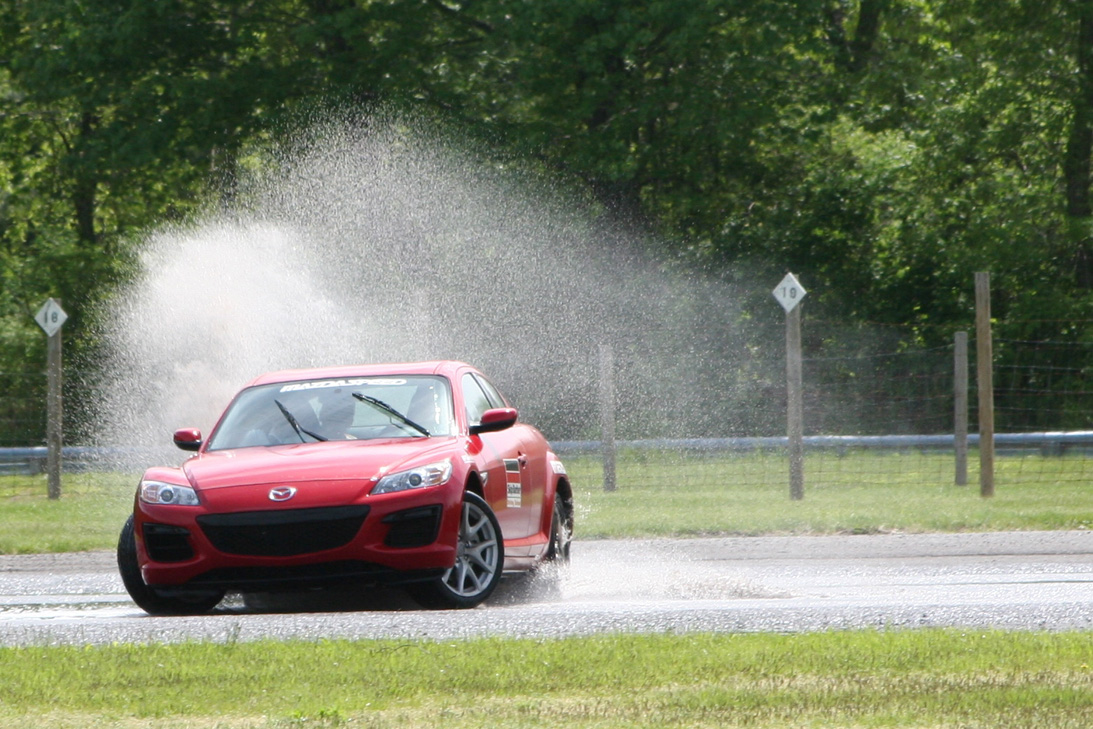
A Mazda RX8 on the Skidpad at Skip Barber Driving School

== History ==
In 1975, Skip Barber started the Skip Barber School of High Performance Driving at Riverside International Raceway. In 1976, it was renamed the Skip Barber Racing School. Despite selling the school in 1999, Barber was the owner of Lime Rock Park from 1984 to April 2021.

On May 22, 2017, the school filed for Chapter 11 bankruptcy.

On December 19, 2017, the school was acquired by DeMonte Motorsports.

On March 22, 2024, the school announced that it has acquired the Superstar Racing Experience with plans for a 2024 season. In August, however, the sale was reported to have fallen through, resulting in SRX management filing a lawsuit.

== In popular culture ==
A Skip Barber Racing School magnet appears on Jerry's refrigerator in the sitcom Seinfeld. The comedian attended the school and competed in several races.

== See also ==
- Barber Pro Series
- Skip Barber Racing (video game)
