= Burnout: Championship Drag Racing =

1998 video game

- Developer: MediaTech West
- Publisher: Bethesda Softworks
- Designer: Brent Erickson
- Engine: XnGine
- Platform: MS-DOS
- Release: NA: March 20, 1998
- Genre: Racing video game
- Modes: Single-player, multiplayer

Burnout: Championship Drag Racing, also known as simply Burnout, is a video game developed by MediaTech West and published by Bethesda Softworks for MS-DOS, released on March 20, 1998. A Player's Choice Edition was released in September 1998 for both DOS and Microsoft Windows. Burnout was licensed by the Hot Rod magazine. Although the name suggests otherwise, the game is not a part of the Burnout series, which would begin 3 years later in 2001.

== Gameplay ==
Burnout Championship Drag Racing is a game of 40-second races, involving a meticulous pre-race setup of each vehicle. With over 60 adjustable components, from suspension and tires to transmission and brakes, the game demands precision tuning to shave off mere fractions of a second. Far from an arcade-style experience, Burnout is a hardcore simulation, designed for players who savor technical depth over flashy gameplay.

== Development ==
The game was developed by Washington based MediaTech West, the same team that did XCar: Experimental Racing in conjunction with Hot Rod Magazine. The game utilizes Bethesda's XnGine It was originally scheduled to be released in November 1997. The game went gold on March 13, 1998 Burnout was released on MPlayer.com in June 1998.

== Reception ==
Reception

Aggregate score
Aggregator	Score
GameRankings	68%

Review scores
Publication	Score
CNET Gamecenter	8/10
Computer Gaming World	4/5
GameRevolution	B
GameSpot	7/10
Next Generation	4/5
PC Gamer (US)	88%
PC Zone	52%
The Cincinnati Enquirer	2.5/5
New York Daily News	4/4

The game received average reviews according to the review aggregation website GameRankings. GameSpot said, "Burnout has such a refreshing feel and intense bursts of white-knuckled action that it's really worth sticking it out for a while." Next Generation found that "The single race is nice for a quick, visceral moment, but the real game is competing in a season or going head-to-head with someone over a network – by far the most adrenaline-pumping way to play."

According to Pete Hines, Director of Marketing and Public Relations at Bethesda, the game is the best-selling drag racing game of all time. According to Tony Sciascia from Sega Dojo, the game sold over 300,000 copies.
