= Skip Barber Racing (video game) =

Cancelled video game

- Developer: Bethesda Softworks
- Publisher: Bethesda Softworks
- Designer: Brent Erickson
- Platform: Windows
- Release: Cancelled
- Genre: RacingSports
- Mode: Multiplayer

Skip Barber Racing is a cancelled video game to be published and developed by Bethesda Softworks. The game was in development in conjunction with the Skip Barber Racing School.

== Gameplay ==
Promotional image, displaying the Barber Pro Series racing cars designed for the game.

Skip Barber Racing was designed as an in-depth simulation with a driving tutorial section so that players would learn the same instructions, techniques and protocols of real racing taught to professional racers by instructors at the Skip Barber Racing School as a part of the lessons and coursework. Players would attend a simulation of the three-day Racing School & Car Control Clinic offered by the school, and the game would include professional evaluation and feedback for the players. Cars used would include the Dodge Dakota truck, Dodge Viper and open-wheel race cars that were used at the actual school. The game would teach players techniques such as trail-braking, and heel-and-toe downshifting.

The game was to allow players to compete in the amateur Formula Dodge and professional Pro Dodge racing cars. Players would compete in virtual championships using at least two different types of cars, the pre-aero Formula Mazda, and Reynard-designed Barber Pro series cars with suspension, wing and brake bias as adjustable components. The physics model would have 6 degrees of freedom, and the tires are all modeled individually and are affected by driver inputs such as throttle, brakes and steering, terrain, suspension, and aerodynamics. The game was designed to include support for Direct 3D and force feedback, as well as positional audio cues, and multi-player support. While the amateur series Formula Dodge cars would be equally prepared so the driver could not make any adjustments, players would be able to make adjustments to the Pro cars in the garage including components such as suspension, wings, and brake bias. The game would feature four views including an in-car view and cockpit view.

== Development ==
The idea to do a Skip Barber racing title was something that we had thought about for years. In 1996 we developed a road-racing product and as a promotion, we joined forces with Skip Barber and gave away several three-day racing school packages. The idea was tossed around for a while after that until the day our now company President, Vlatko Andonov, actually attended a three-day school. It then became remarkably easy to persuade Vlatko to do a product based on the Skip Barber programs.

— Brent Erickson on the idea behind Skip Barber Racing

The game was announced in April 1999. It was originally scheduled to release in late 1999, before being pushed back to early 2000 and early 2001. The game's lead designer was Brent Erickson. Rumors of the game's cancellation first surfaced in December 2000.
