= Wraithborne =

2012 video game

- Developer: Alpha Dog Games
- Publisher: Crescent Moon Games
- Engine: Unreal Engine
- Platforms: iOS, Ouya, Android
- Release: iOS; November 8, 2012; Ouya; August 8, 2013; Android; February 18, 2014
- Genre: Action role-playing
- Mode: Single-player

Wraithborne is an action role-playing game developed by Alpha Dog Games and published by Crescent Moon Games for iOS in 2012, for Ouya in 2013, and for Android in 2014.

== Development ==
The game was developed in six months.

== Reception ==
Reception

Aggregate score
Aggregator	Score
Metacritic	68/100

Review scores
Publication	Score
Gamezebo	3.5/5 stars
IGN	5.2/10
MeriStation	6.8/10
Pocket Gamer	3.5/5 stars
TouchArcade	3.5/5 stars
Digital Spy	3/5 stars

The iOS version received "average" reviews according to the review aggregation website Metacritic.
