= IHRA Drag Racing 2004 =

2003 video game

- Developer(s): Super Happy Fun Fun
- Publisher(s): Bethesda Softworks
- Series: IHRA Drag Racing
- Platform(s): Xbox
- Release: November 2003
- Genre(s): Racing

IHRA Drag Racing 2004 is a 2003 video game from Bethesda Softworks. It is based on IHRA Drag Racing 2.

== Gameplay ==
IHRA Drag Racing 2004 focuses on drag racing, requiring players to drive high-performance vehicles in a straight line. It features licensed drivers and real auto manufacturers. The game accurately represents drag racing, including managing the dragster's engine, tires, and other elements. The game supports Xbox Live, allowing players to download new dragsters.

== Development ==
The game was developed by Super Happy Fun Fun, a company founded in 2001.

== Reception ==
Reception

Review scores
Publication	Score
All Game Guide	2/5
IGN	1.9/10
TeamXbox	5.1/10
Xbox Nation	4/10

IGN gave the game a score of 1.9 out of 10, stating: "Lifting your dining room table two inches off the ground and watching whatever's on it slide off the end would produce more thrills than anything in this game." IHRA Drag Racing 2004 had the ability to download extra content from Xbox Live Criticism was directed toward's the game's bad graphics, lack of track variety, and extremely simple gameplay.
