= Wayne Gretzky Hockey =

1988 video game

- Developer: Bethesda Softworks
- Publishers: Bethesda Softworks; Toy Headquarters (NES)
- Composer: Julian LeFay
- Platforms: Amiga, Atari ST, MS-DOS, Classic Mac OS, NES
- Release: NA: 1988
- Genre: Sports
- Modes: Single-player, multiplayer

Wayne Gretzky Hockey is an ice hockey-themed sports video game developed by Bethesda Softworks, and first published in 1988.

== Gameplay ==
The game features the name and likeness of Canadian professional ice hockey centre Wayne Gretzky. Wayne Gretzky Hockey features realistic sounds, animations, and gameplay physics. Players can choose from three modes — Control Player, Play and Coach, and Coach Only — each offering unique levels of interaction. The overhead view provides a strategic perspective, while the "Instant Replay" feature allows players to analyze plays in detail. The game includes customizable team colors, energy-based player fatigue, and a physics-based puck system. Coaching decisions, like line changes and play selection, add depth, and the mouse-based control system allows precise movement and shooting. Animated referee calls, scoreboard sequences, and a simulated Zamboni are also featured.

== Release ==
Bethesda Softworks published Wayne Gretzky Hockey shortly after Peter Pocklington traded Gretzky from the Edmonton Oilers to the Los Angeles Kings on August 9, 1988.

Bethesda Softworks followed the game with two sequels: Wayne Gretzky Hockey 2 (1990) and Wayne Gretzky Hockey 3 (1992).

== Reception ==
Reception

Review score
Publication	Score
GamePro	NES: 20/25

Sales of Wayne Gretzky Hockey reached 350,000 units by 1995, which "put Bethesda Softworks on the gaming map", according to PC Gamer US.

In the April 1989 edition of Computer Gaming World, Johnny Wilson gave an "unhesitating recommendation" of the game "to anyone who enjoys hockey".

In the January 1990 edition of Games International (Issue 12), Mike Siggins found the arcade version of the game uninspiring, and the strategy game only a bit better. He concluded by giving the game 3 out of 5 for game play and 4 out of 5 for graphics, saying, "It is among the best hockey games around but sadly, given the earlier efforts in this field, that is not saying much [...] It is neither a good arcade game or stats based game, while it attempts to do both."

In 1996, Computer Gaming World declared Wayne Gretzky Hockey the 111th-best computer game ever released. The Amiga version of the game was voted “Best Sports Simulation of the Year’ by members of the Software Publishers Association.

== See also ==
- Wayne Gretzky's 3D Hockey (1996)
