= The Elder Scrolls Travels: Shadowkey =

2004 video game

- Developers: Vir2L Studios, TKO Software
- Publisher: Bethesda Softworks
- Series: The Elder Scrolls Travels
- Platform: N-Gage
- Release: November 9, 2004

The Elder Scrolls Travels: Shadowkey is a role-playing game developed by Vir2L Studios exclusively for N-Gage.

== Gameplay ==
Players create their character from a choice of nine character classes (Assassin, Barbarian, Battlemage, Knight, Nightblade, Rogue, Spellsword, Sorcerer, and Thief) and eight races (Argonian, Breton, High Elf, Dark Elf, Khajiit, Nord, Redguard, and Wood Elf). Gameplay features first-person RPG mechanics, and 3D graphics.

The core gameplay involves exploration, combat, and quests, with a mix of indoor dungeons and open-world locations filled with monsters and NPCs. Characters fight using a hack and slash combat system. The game also features character progression, where leveling up allows players to customize their character's strengths and attributes.

The game offers multiplayer functionality, allowing up to four players to team up via Bluetooth. Solo players can access N-Gage Arena extras, including downloads, rankings, and community features.

Players start with basic quests, such as hunting rats, but the game quickly escalates into more complex missions.

== Plot ==
The player character, an unnamed resident of Azra's Crossing, Hammerfell, is tasked with defeating the Umbra'Keth—a powerful "Shadow of Conflict" created by the ongoing War of the Bendr'Mahk. To this end, the protagonist must gather the seven Star Teeth, ancient crystals infused with the magical power of the stars. Meanwhile, both the Imperial Battlemage Jagar Tharn and Shadowmage Pergan Asuul are independently searching for the Star Teeth in order to bind the Umbra'Keth to their will.

== Development ==
The game was announced in May 2004. The Shadowkey development team consisted of 15 members from Vir2L Studios, Bethesda Softworks, TKO and Nokia and was developed in about nine months. Developers worked closely with the original Elder Scrolls team to ensure authenticity.

== Reception ==
Reception

Review scores
Publication	Score
1Up.com	6/10
GameSpy	3/5
GameSpot	6.1/10
GameZone	6.9/10

The Elder Scrolls Travels: Shadowkey received generally mixed reviews from critics, and holds a score of 59 on Metacritic.

Avery Score of GameSpot criticized the game's controls, combat system, and short draw distance, feeling the gameplay to be "crippled" by N-Gage's technological limitations. He also dismissed the storyline as "unremarkable", but praised the game's co-op multiplayer mode and the use of the soundtrack from Morrowind.
