= IHRA Drag Racing: Sportsman Edition =

2006 video game

- Developer: Bethesda Game Studios
- Publisher: Bethesda Softworks
- Series: IHRA Drag Racing
- Engine: Gamebryo
- Platforms: PlayStation 2, Windows, Xbox
- Release: June 12, 2006
- Genre: Racing

IHRA Drag Racing: Sportsman Edition is a 2006 video game published by Bethesda Softworks.

== Gameplay ==
IHRA Drag Racing - Sportsman Edition is a drag racing simulation focused on quick reflexes. Players perform burnouts to heat their tires, roll back to the starting line, and race straight down the track, adjusting slightly to maintain direction. The game includes a handicap system based on estimated race times. Players have no ability to sell cars or parts.

== Development ==
The game was announced in May 2005 with a release date of Q3 2005.

== Reception ==
Reception

Aggregate score
Aggregator	Score
Metacritic	35/100

Review scores
Publication	Score
AllGame	2/5
GameSpot	3.4/10
GamesRadar+	2/5
IGN	2.3/10
TeamXbox	3/10

IHRA Drag Racing: Sportsman Edition received negative reviews from critics. On Metacritic, the game holds a score of 35/100 for the Xbox version based on 4 reviews. TeamXbox gave the Xbox version of the game a rating of 3 of 10 stating "Unless you're that one extraordinarily diehard drag racing fan that's out there, chances are this game won't exactly light your fire. Pass on this for any of the other wonderful racing experiences that the Xbox already has in its library."
