= NCAA Basketball: Road to the Final Four 2 =

1994 video game

- Developer: Bethesda Softworks
- Publisher: Bethesda Softworks
- Producer: Todd Howard
- Platform: DOS
- Release: March 31, 1994

NCAA Basketball: Road to the Final Four 2 (also known as NCAA: Road to the Final Four 2) is a sports simulation video game developed and published by Bethesda Softworks with the National Collegiate Athletic Association (NCAA) license. Released in 1994 for DOS, the game is a sequel to the 1992 NCAA Basketball: Road to the Final Four.

== Gameplay ==
NCAA Basketball: Road to the Final Four 2 is a college basketball simulation of the 1994 NCAA Division I men's basketball tournament, which includes 64 college basketball teams. The basketball players have individual AI behavior based on NCAA statistics.

== Development ==
NCAA Basketball: Road to the Final Four 2 was produced by Todd Howard. It was the first game Howard worked on. When developing the game's format, Bethesda sought input from current and former NCAA coaches as well as former players. The game was originally scheduled to release in September 1993.

== Reception ==
Reception

Review scores
Publication	Score
Joystick	75%
PC Player	64%
PC Games	79%
PC Team	72%
PC Gamer	80%
The Age	3.5/5

While he called the chase-camera perspective "innovative" and said it "will sit well with fans of the genre", Jed Bowtell of The Age felt that the feature would not lure players averse to sports simulations.
