= NCAA Basketball: Road to the Final Four =

1992 video game

- Developer(s): Bethesda Softworks; Mirage Graphics
- Publisher(s): Bethesda Softworks; Mirage Graphics
- Platform(s): IBM
- Release: 1992

NCAA Basketball: Road to the Final Four is a basketball video game. The game was a joint effort by Bethesda Softworks and Earl Weaver Baseball creators Mirage Graphics. A sequel, NCAA Basketball: Road to the Final Four 2, was released in 1994.

== Gameplay ==
NCAA Basketball: Road to the Final Four is a college basketball simulation which includes all 64 teams that appeared in the 1991 NCAA Division I men's basketball tournament.

== Development ==
The game was in development for three years.

== Reception ==
Reception

Review scores
Publication	Score
Aktueller Software Markt	5/12
Joystick	70%
Power Play	70/100
PC Joker	35%

Dennis Lynch from the Chicago Tribune stated: "Consequently, though it looks great, it soon becomes a bore. This is one basketball program that should be bounced.

German magazine Power Play stated: "Basketball freaks should strike – those who want to become one should take a look – the extensive manual helps just fine. However, this program is not suitable for action athletes"

The Albuquerque Journal said: "These are minor problems and can be corrected, but for a price tag of nearly $50 in most local stores, one has the right to expect a little more accuracy".
