= NIRA Intense Import Drag Racing =

1999 video game

- Developer: Bethesda Softworks
- Publisher: Bethesda Softworks
- Producer: Brent Erickson
- Engine: XnGine
- Platform: MS-DOS
- Release: May 1999
- Modes: Single-player, multiplayer

NIRA Intense Import Drag Racing is a drag racing simulation video game developed and published by Bethesda Softworks. The game is sanctioned by the National Import Racing Association.

== Gameplay ==
NIRA Intense Import Drag Racing is a racing game in which players can extensively modify their cars, including engine, transmission, tires, and more. There are over 85 engines to choose from. The game features two main types of races: straight drag racing and handicapped racing, where players dial-in expected finish times. Handicapped racing involves strategic planning based on car performance and weather conditions. Realistic game physics provide a sensation of high speeds and require careful steering to avoid crashes. The game supported up to 32 players via LAN or online.

== Reception ==
Reception

Review scores
Publication	Score
GameSpot	6.4/10
IGN	70%
PC Gameworld	56%

IGN rated the game a 7 of 10 saying "Overall, the game designers did a good job with NIRA Intense Import Drag Racing. I didn't like it quite as much as Burnout: Championship Drag Racing, but it was fun and it did keep me coming back for more, at least for a while."

Stephen Poole of GameSpot rated the game a 6.4 of 10 saying "However, it turns out that NIRA Intense Import Drag Racing is little more than an add-on pack for Hot Rod Championship Drag Racing designed to run as a stand-alone product".

Tampa Bay Times said "If you're not into drag racing, it can quickly become tedious and boring"
