= Operation: Matriarchy =

2005 video game

- Developer: MADia Entertainment
- Publisher: Buka Entertainment
- Producer: Sergey Lozovoy
- Designers: Nikolay Lezhnev; Stas Sokolov; Petr Poray‑ Koshits
- Programmer: Kirill Prazdnikov
- Artists: Sergey Lozovoy; Alexey Bykov
- Composer: Dmitry Zhelonkin
- Platform: Microsoft Windows
- Release: August 25, 2005
- Genre: First-person shooter
- Modes: Single player, multiplayer

Operation: Matriarchy, known in Russia as Velian (Велиан), is a 2005 science fiction first-person shooter game developed by Russian studio MADia Entertainment and published by Buka Entertainment for Microsoft Windows. The game is a spin-off from MADia's simulation franchise Echelon.

== Plot ==
In the 24th century mankind has formed itself into the Federation of Earth, and has colonized several other planets. However, around 2350 a mysterious virus ravages the colony planet of Velia, targeting only the females within the population. They are transformed into brutal killing-machines, while the males are enslaved for use as sustenance or as subjects for genetic experiments. Having now evolved into an aggressive hive mind, the Velians turn on the Federation, instigating a brutal war. The game begins seven years into the conflict, when the player character, Senior Sergeant Paul Armstrong of the Federation, finds himself forced to take on the Velians when they attack his ship.

== Community support ==
Operation: Matriarchy was released with what appeared to be damaged music files and incomplete sound files; all of the music files, except for the main menu track, simply play static, while several of the sound files are simply silence. A pair of fan-made mods that replace these files and made other enhancements to the game were released. In 2007, a fan-made music and sound enhancement unofficial patch was released, which added a complete in-game music score and enhanced sound effects. In addition, the story was rewritten. In 2009, a fan-made adaption appeared. This offered a complete (optional) translation to German and further changes to the sound effects and music. However, the largest changes were to the visuals, with enhanced lighting and improved versions of many textures and bump maps.
