= IHRA Drag Racing (video game) =

2000 video game

- Developer: Digital Dialect
- Publishers: Bethesda Softworks, Vir2L Studios
- Series: IHRA Drag Racing
- Platforms: PlayStation, Windows
- Release: Windows; November 29, 2000; PlayStation; November 20, 2001
- Genre: Racing
- Modes: Single-player, multiplayer

IHRA Drag Racing is a racing video game developed by Digital Dialect and published by Bethesda Softworks. It is part of the IHRA Drag Racing series of video games. A Dreamcast version, which was scheduled to release on April 25, 2001, was canceled. The game was released on mobile phones on June 1, 2003.

== Gameplay ==
IHRA Drag Racing is a racing game that features 10 of the 11 tracks from the 2001 IHRA Summit Drag Racing Series and includes the cars of 20 professional racers, though players compete against fictional drivers rather than the real-life racers. The game incorporates weather dynamics. Players can modify their car's appearance using external paint programs. Force feedback support is absent, and replays are restricted to a small viewing window rather than full-screen mode. A post-launch patch introduced over 20 fixes, including engine damage and online multiplayer via GameSpy.

== Development ==
The game was announced in March 1999. The game was scheduled to release in Q2 2000.

== Reception ==
Reception

Review score
Publication	Score
GameSpot	5.3/10

Stephen Poole of GameSpot reviewed IHRA Drag Racing for Microsoft Windows and rated it a 5.3 of 10 stating "If you devote a lot of time and patience to the game, there's certainly some fun to be had in IHRA Drag Racing. Unfortunately, because of all the game's problems, it seems likely that not many players will stick with it long enough to enjoy it."

== Sales ==
IHRA Drag Racing sold more than 750,000 copies by March 2003 and over 1 million by November 2003.
