= IHRA Professional Drag Racing 2005 =

2004 video game

- Developer: Bethesda Game Studios
- Publisher: Bethesda Softworks
- Producer: Ashley Cheng
- Series: IHRA Drag Racing
- Engine: Gamebryo
- Platforms: PlayStation 2, Windows, Xbox
- Release: November 10, 2004
- Genre: Racing
- Modes: Single-player, multiplayer

IHRA Professional Drag Racing 2005 is a 2004 racing video game from Bethesda Softworks.

== Gameplay ==
IHRA Professional Drag Racing 2005 is a dedicated drag racing game with two modes of play: arcade mode and a career/simulation mode. Two players can compete in split-screen local multiplayer. The game features over 50 customizable vehicles from professional IHRA levels like Top Fuel, Pro Mod, Pro Stock, and Alcohol Funny Cars. Players are able to crash the vehicles. The environments are recreations of licensed racing venues. The game includes detailed weather effects, day-and-night racing, and various tuning options, all designed for accessibility.

== Development and release ==
IHRA Professional Drag Racing 2005 was published by Bethesda Softworks and developed by its in-house development team, Bethesda Game Studios. The developers used Numerical Design Limited's Gamebryo game engine to create the game. Bethesda made changes from the previous IHRA Drag Racing installment in order to make the game more console friendly; the 12-event season carried over and new arcade-style modes were added.

The publisher announced IHRA 2005 in early May 2004 as an officially licensed product of the International Hot Rod Association. A few days later, the company showcased it at the 2004 E3 trade show. The game was available behind a closed-door display while a drag racing car and promotional models were on the show room floor. Producer Ashley Cheng was present and announced that the game would release in the fourth quarter of 2004 on personal computers and the Xbox and PlayStation 2 home consoles. IHRA 2005 was among the original Xbox games that were backwards compatible with the Xbox 360 console at launch.

== Reception ==
Reception

Aggregate score
Aggregator	Score
Metacritic	36/100

Review scores
Publication	Score
AllGame	1.5/5
IGN	3.1/10
TeamXbox	5.2/10

IHRA Professional Drag Racing 2005 received negative reviews from critics. On Metacritic, the game holds a score of 36/100 for the Xbox version based on 5 reviews. While Dale Legba of TeamXbox felt there were improvements over the previous entry, he lambasted the game, describing the gameplay as "mindless" and the audiovisuals as weak. He considered the Simulation mode a good addition but felt it was not enough to overcome the game's shortcomings. Legba suggested against purchasing it, recommending that only "hardcore motorsports fans" rent it instead.
