= PBA Tour Bowling 2 =

2000 video game

- Developer: Bethesda Softworks
- Publisher: Bethesda Softworks
- Platform: Windows
- Release: February 2000

PBA Tour Bowling 2 (also known as PBA Bowling 2) is a bowling video game developed and published by Bethesda Softworks. Official licensed by the Professional Bowlers Association, the game is a sequel to PBA Bowling.

== Gameplay ==
PBA Tour Bowling 2 is an adaptation professional bowling in which the player competes against other computer players to obtain the highest score. The player uses the computer mouse to control their virtual bowler’s movement, shot strength, precision, and spin. The game features AI opponents and multiplayer matches on the same computer. Customization options allow the player to change hairstyles and clothing, as well as change the weight, color, and texture of the ball.

== Development ==
The game was in development as early as December 1997 and was scheduled to release in 1998. A Dreamcast version was scheduled to release in 2001, but was never released.

== Reception ==
Reception

Review scores
Publication	Score
All Game Guide	2/5
Hacker	9%
IGN	4.5/10

Scott Steinberg of IGN condemned PBA Tour Bowling 2, scoring it low on the website's rating scale. Comparing the game to its predecessor, he wrote that "PBA Bowling 2 certainly leaves a lot to be desired" and commented that the developers failed to go above the base requirements of a bowling simulation.
