= Gromada (video game) =

2000 video game

- Developer: Buka Entertainment
- Publishers: EU: Buka Entertainment; NA: Bethesda Softworks
- Designer: Eugeny Pastukhov
- Platform: Windows
- Release: April 24, 2000

Gromada (Russian: Громада) is a video game developed by Russian studio Buka Entertainment and published by Bethesda Softworks. The game is an arcade shooter.

== Gameplay ==
Gromada is an action-shooter game featuring tank-based combat with a futuristic prototype named Kassandra. Players navigate missions from a world map, engaging in battles against enemy tanks, turrets, and airborne units. The game emphasizes vehicular combat, with occasional objectives like finding keys or upgrading weapons.

== Development ==
The game was announced in April 1999. It was scheduled to release in Q2 1999.

== Reception ==
Reception

Review scores
Publication	Score
GamesIndustry News	4.5/5
Game Critic	3.5/5
GameZone	7/10
Gamezilla	85/100
IGN	6.3/10
Multi-Player Online Gaming	3.5/5

Game Industry News gave the game a 4.5 of 5 stating " All the categories—sound, graphics, gameplay, controls, story, and even entertainment—are simple enough for kids to enjoy but still interesting enough to keep older gamers intrigued and working their way through each arena of Gromada.

Game industry News nominated Gromada as a finalist for its 2000 Family Entertainment Game of the Year award.
