= Hockey League Simulator 2 =

1992 video game

- Developer: Bethesda Softworks
- Publisher: Bethesda Softworks
- Designer: Nick Volkov
- Platform: MS-DOS
- Release: October 1992

Hockey League Simulator 2 (HLS2) is a 1992 ice hockey-themed sports game from Bethesda Softworks. The game is fully compatible with Wayne Gretzky Hockey 3.

== Gameplay ==
Hockey League Simulator 2 features gameplay from an executive's perspective, allowing the player to draft a team and organize its schedule, and hire or fire the coach. As the general manager of a team, the player has the ability to trade players and send them down or back up from the minors. The player can become involved in preseason negotiations to draft hockey players. The player can create custom leagues that can use game played in Wayne Gretzky Hockey 3 as well as fantasy or rotisserie leagues.

The player uses detailed menus to access commands for all of the different options. The player is able to manipulate and change player statistics, financial statistics, and performance statistics. This game included an 'injury prone' option so that players could set the level of injuries during a season.

The player can switch back and forth between viewing the final scores after playing games, to watching a period-by-period recap of the scoring. The player can replay an entire season in a single sitting. The player can play through each game of the season using either Wayne Gretzky Hockey III or with a quick simulation mode.

== Reception ==
Reception

Review scores
Publication	Score
All Game Guide	3/5
Computer Game Review	75%
PC Games	29/100
Pelit	92/100

Peter Freunscht from PC Games rated the game a 29 of 100 criticizing the poor sound and other issues.

Mika Nirvi from Pelit rated the game a 92 of 100 stating "The game comfort is good. The optimal mode of play is the combined mouse-keyboard combination. The direct-dial keys make the game easier and you can catch up quickly. The sounds and animation are top-notch and they create their own atmosphere in the game. The wide selection options and the ability to play HLS2 games keep Wayne Gretzky Hockey 3 as its hockey king".
