= Wayne Gretzky Hockey 2 =

1990 video game

- Developer: Bethesda Softworks
- Publisher: Bethesda Softworks
- Platforms: MS-DOS, Amiga
- Release: November 1990: MS-DOS; 1991: Amiga
- Genre: Sports (ice hockey)
- Mode: Single-player

Wayne Gretzky Hockey 2 is an ice hockey-themed sports video game from Bethesda Softworks. It was published for MS-DOS in 1990 and Amiga in 1991. The game is a sequel to Wayne Gretzky Hockey (1988).

== Gameplay ==
Screenshot of gameplay

The game is rendered two-dimensionally (from directly above the ice). Unlike the original Wayne Gretzky Hockey where two players could compete only against each other, in Gretzky 2 two friends can play on the same team. Players have the option of choosing from the four Stanley Cup finalists of 1970 and 1971, as well as the 1988 Edmonton Oilers and the 1989 Los Angeles Kings. The game has a database which rates the hockey players into 11 categories of skills. The game includes a text line which displays which of the players is handling the puck at the moment.

== Development ==
Doug Carpenter consulted in the programming of the game.

== Reception ==
Reception

Review scores
Publication	Score
Amiga Action	78%
Amiga Format	78%
Amiga Joker	78%
Aktueller Software Markt	8.8/12
CU Amiga	61%
Datormagazin	86%
PC Joker	77%
Power Play Magazine	68%

PC Joker rated the game 77 of 100, stating "Of course, the good Wayne remains unchallenged on the first place in the table because, in terms of graphics, sound, handling (mouse, joy, buttons) and realism, none of the competitors can still outdo him. But a simple update would have achieved the same thing at half the price"

Aktueller Software Markt rated the game an 8.8 of 12 stating "Of course, the question arises: Is it worth it for owners of WGH to loosen up another 90 Marker to get WGH II? I do not think so, because the real strengths of the program, lie in the action on the ice. And after all, very little has changed in this. Those who do not yet call the precursor their own, however, should buy WGH II, because the new features provide additional variety and long-term motivation"

The game was nominated by members of the Software Publishers Association as the best new sports program of 1990.
