= PBA Bowling (1995 video game) =

- Developers: Bethesda Softworks; MediaTech West
- Publisher: Bethesda Softworks
- Platform: Windows
- Release: November 15, 1995
- Genre: Sports (Bowling)

PBA Bowling is a 1995 bowling sports-based video game from Bethesda Softworks. It is the official bowling game of the Professional Bowlers Association. A sequel, PBA Tour Bowling 2, was released in 2000.

== Gameplay ==
PBA Bowling has available play modes of singles, teams, and tournament/league. Players customize their own bowlers, selecting characters, naming them and selecting their clothes. Players interact with the game using four windows: the scorecard, a view to set the spin and power on the ball, a view for aiming the shot, and a display of the ball hitting the pins. Players are able to select their ball weight and choose lane conditions. Players may position their bowlers anywhere on the lane, using the aiming arrows to line up the throw.

== Development ==
PBA Bowling was developed by Bethesda Softworks and MediaTech West. Bruce Nesmith was involved in the project. The game features the PBA logo on the packaging along with an endorsement from PBA Hall of Famer Walter Ray Williams Jr. Williams' likeness also appears on the packaging.

Virgin Interactive Entertainment distributed the game in the UK, Germany, Australia, Scandinavia, Spain, and Italy.

== Reception ==
Reception

Review scores
Publication	Score
Electric Games	88%
GameSpot	6.2/10
PC Joker	48%
PC Gamer	70%
Power Play Magazine	46%
PC Spiel	5/5
VideoGames & Computer Entertainment	6/10

GameSpot gave the game a 6.2 of 10 stating "I'm sure there are people out there saying “Yeah, football and baseball are great, but when is a bowling game for the PC coming out?” Well, here it is. And, if you're a die-hard bowler, it's probably all you hoped for. For the rest of us, though, PBA Bowling leaves a little to be desired."

PC Gamer gave the game a 70% of 100 stating " PBA is one of a king simulation and great fun for fans of sport-but you may tire of the solo action before the beer frame"

Peter Scisco from CNET recommended the game stating "There's no lounge, either. So even if the PBA Bowling is enough sports action for you, you still have an excuse to get out to the lanes. Either way you look at, it's best to download a demo first to see for yourself"

The game was regarded as "moderately successful" according to PC Data and helped rank Bethesda as the 46th largest game publisher in 1996.

According to Pete Hines, Director of Marketing and Public Relations at Bethesda, the game is the best-selling bowling game of all time.
