= The Elder Scrolls Online =

2014 video game

- Developer: ZeniMax Online Studios (Note: Bethesda Game Studios consulted on development.)
- Publisher: Bethesda Softworks
- Director: Nick Giacomini
- Producer: Ala Diaz
- Designers: Nick Konkle; Richard Lambert
- Programmer: Daniel Dunham
- Artists: Jared Carr; Mathew Weathers
- Writers: Wynne McLaughlin; Lawrence Schick
- Composers: Brad Derrick; Jeremy Soule; Rik Schaffer; Inon Zur
- Series: The Elder Scrolls
- Engine: Improved Gamebryo engine
- Platforms: Windows; macOS; PlayStation 4; PlayStation 5; Xbox One; Xbox Series X/S
- Release: Windows, macOS; April 4, 2014; PS4, Xbox One; June 9, 2015; PS5, Xbox Series X/S; June 15, 2021
- Genre: Massively multiplayer online role-playing
- Mode: Multiplayer

The Elder Scrolls Online, abbreviated ESO, is a massively multiplayer online role-playing game (MMORPG) developed by ZeniMax Online Studios and published by Bethesda Softworks. The game is a part of the Elder Scrolls series. It was released for Windows and macOS in April 2014, for PlayStation 4 and Xbox One in June 2015, and for PlayStation 5 and Xbox Series X/S in June 2021.

The Elder Scrolls Online is set on the continent of Tamriel and features a storyline indirectly connected with the other games in the Elder Scrolls series. The game was in development for seven years before its release in 2014 and launched with a mandatory monthly subscription model.

The Elder Scrolls Online initially received mixed reviews from critics. Reception improved significantly with the March 2015 re-release and rebranding as The Elder Scrolls Online: Tamriel Unlimited, transitioning to a buy-to-play model with microtransactions and an optional subscription. The game had sold over 15 million units by 2020 and generated over $2 billion in revenue by 2024.

In December 2024, ZeniMax Online Studios revealed a major shift in content delivery for The Elder Scrolls Online. Beginning in 2025, the game moved away from its traditional annual chapter releases in favor of a seasonal content model. This new structure is designed to offer players more frequent and consistent updates throughout the year.

== Gameplay ==
Like previous Elder Scrolls games, The Elder Scrolls Online can be played from either a first or third-person perspective. Gameplay is mostly non-linear, with a mixture of quests, random events, and free-roaming exploration of the world. The game does not provide a mode for single-player offline play, although the developers stated that there would be "plenty of content" for online solo play.

The player can choose between ten different races for their character:

- Humans: Nords, Redguards, Bretons, and (with separate purchase) Imperials
- Elvish races: Dunmer (Dark Elves), Altmer (High Elves), Bosmer (Wood Elves), and Orsimer (Orcs)
- Bestial races: Khajiit and Argonians

Players also choose one of seven classes when creating a character: Dragonknight, Sorcerer, Nightblade, Templar, Warden, Necromancer, or Arcanist. Each class gives the player different attacks, spells, and passive effects. The game has other character choices beyond those of race and class, such as the player character also being able to become either a vampire or a werewolf, each of which grants access to its own skill tree. As of Update 49, released on March 9, 2026, it has become more accessible to become either a vampire or a werewolf. The monetization of cures in the Crown Store has been removed along with the option of purchasing vampirism/lycanthropy.

There are seven different crafting skill lines: Alchemy, Blacksmithing, Clothier, Enchanting, Woodworking, Provisioning, and Jewelry Crafting.

== Setting ==
The Elder Scrolls Online is set on the continent of Tamriel during the Second Era, but not all places in Tamriel are playable. The events of the game occur a millennium before those of The Elder Scrolls V: Skyrim and around 800 years before The Elder Scrolls III: Morrowind and The Elder Scrolls IV: Oblivion. Its structure is broadly similar to Skyrim, with two separate conflicts progressing at the same time, one with the fate of the world in the balance, and one where the prize is supreme power on Tamriel. In The Elder Scrolls Online, the first struggle is against the Daedric Prince Molag Bal, who is attempting to meld the plane of Mundus with his realm of Coldharbour, and the second is to capture the vacant imperial throne, contested by three alliances of the mortal races. The player character has been sacrificed to Molag Bal, and Molag Bal has stolen their soul, the recovery of which is the primary game objective.

Many parts of the continent of Tamriel can be explored in the game, with all zones accessible regardless of faction or player level. Some zones become accessible only through DLCs, which can be either purchased from the Crown Store or are available as part of the ESO Plus subscription service. Players have the opportunity to join any of the three factions warring over the Ruby Throne of the Emperor of Tamriel: the First Aldmeri Dominion (represented by an eagle) led by Queen Ayrenn and composed of the Altmer (High Elf), Bosmer (Wood Elf), and Khajiit races; the Daggerfall Covenant (represented by a lion) led by High King Emeric and composed of the Bretons, Redguards, and Orsimer (Orcs); and the Ebonheart Pact (represented by a dragon) led by Jorunn Skald-King and composed of the Nord, Dunmer (Dark Elf), and Argonian races.

Players may also unlock the Imperial race by purchasing the Digital Imperial Edition Upgrade in the Crown Store, which may be a part of any of the three factions. The other major ruling faction of Tamriel is the Empire itself, led by Empress Regent Clivia Tharn, which has fallen into instability and disrepair and serves as a non-joinable faction. Pre-ordered copies of the game included the "Explorers' Pack" which allowed all races to be played in each of the factions, and this feature is also available in the Crown Store.

The game begins in the Wailing Prison in Coldharbour, where the player character's soulless husk (known as a soul shriven) has been enslaved. This opening continues another Elder Scrolls tradition of beginning the game with the player as a prisoner. After escaping, the base of operations becomes the Harborage, a cave found at each of the starting cities where the Prophet opens portals to the locations of the main questline. Once the Amulet of Kings is retrieved, the headquarters shift to the Hollow City, a location in central Coldharbour blessed by Meridia.

Civilians saved from Coldharbour's prisons arrive in the Hollow City, and it is from there that attacks are orchestrated on Molag Bal's controlled areas.

== Development ==
The Elder Scrolls Online had been in development for seven years before its release in 2014. It was the first project from ZeniMax Online Studios, which was formed in 2007 as a subsidiary of ZeniMax Media. Matt Firor, studio lead at ZeniMax Online, served as director of The Elder Scrolls Online. ZeniMax Online licensed the HeroEngine in November 2007, which was used as a whiteboard for the game while the main production engine was in development. The game's development was funded by Providence Equity Partners and reinvested profits from the success of The Elder Scrolls IV: Oblivion.

Rumors of a massively multiplayer Elder Scrolls game had been circulating for years, first prompted by a domain registration by ZeniMax Media in November 2007 for ElderScrollsOnline.com. Information about the game and its imminent May 2012 announcement was leaked in March 2012 to online publication Tom's Guide by an anonymous industry source. According to the leak, the game was scheduled to be shown at E3 2012 in June and QuakeCon 2012 in August. On November 8, 2012, Bethesda released a video on YouTube called "An Introduction to The Elder Scrolls Online", in which the game's developers talk about the game's content and development. Several actors were announced to voice characters in the game, including John Cleese, Bill Nighy, Kate Beckinsale, Lynda Carter, Alfred Molina, Michael Gambon, Jennifer Hale, Malcolm McDowell, and Peter Stormare. Beta sign-ups for The Elder Scrolls Online began on January 21, 2013, and continued for seven rounds until February 26.

In June 2013, Sony announced that The Elder Scrolls Online would be available on PlayStation 4 at its E3 press conference. Bethesda later clarified availability on Xbox One. Cross-platform play was only supported on Windows and Mac, and not Xbox One or PlayStation 4. In August 2013, at Gamescom, it was announced that The Elder Scrolls Online would have a monthly subscription fee upon release for all platforms. Subscriptions could be purchased in 30-, 90-, and 180-day increments. It was announced in January 2014 that the game would not require a PlayStation Plus subscription to play online, but that the Xbox One version would require an Xbox Live Gold subscription in addition to an Elder Scrolls Online monthly subscription. On May 8, 2014, Bethesda spoke about development of the console editions, announcing that the release date for the PlayStation 4 and Xbox One versions of the game would be delayed until the end of 2014, though it was revealed in December 2014 that the game's console debut had once again been delayed into early 2015. ZeniMax Online Studios announced that players who purchased The Elder Scrolls Online before the end of June 2014 would have the opportunity to transfer their characters from Windows or Mac OS to either console platform and receive a free 30-day subscription.

== Releases ==
=== Original release ===
The Elder Scrolls Online was announced on May 3, 2012, on the Game Informer website and in that same month's issue of the magazine. It was released on April 4, 2014, for Windows and Mac. It was released for the PlayStation 4 and Xbox One consoles on June 9, 2015. The game was later ported over to Stadia on June 16, 2020.

Shortly after launch, some players reportedly were unable to activate the 30-day complimentary game time without a subscription and—in "a strange state of affairs" and "most likely a mistake"—after a full month had been paid for. A serious item duplication exploit was discovered that allowed players to gain huge fortunes, which was patched shortly after release. ZeniMax later announced that they had permanently banned thousands of accounts because of the exploit.

=== Tamriel Unlimited ===
A subscription is no longer needed to play the game since March 17, 2015. Aside from the initial game price, an optional subscription called "ESO Plus" grants access to all current and future downloadable content (DLC) and a monthly allotment of 1650 Crowns (1500 at the time), one of the in-game currencies, and also grants perks of 10% faster progress than a free player.

=== Gold Edition ===
On July 6, 2016, ZeniMax announced Elder Scrolls Online: Gold Edition for September 9, 2016. It includes the base game, a certain vanity item, and the four major DLCs: Imperial City, Orsinium, Thieves Guild, and Dark Brotherhood. ZeniMax released the "Guilds and Glory" DLC pack for users who already own the base game.

== DLCs and updates ==
=== Chapters ===
The Elder Scrolls Online has received multiple major expansions in the form of downloadable "chapters" since the game was released in April 2014, with each new chapter releasing on a yearly basis. Eight total chapters have been released. The most recent, Gold Road, was released in June 2024.

==== Morrowind ====
On January 31, 2017, an expansion titled Morrowind was announced by ZeniMax. The expansion is set in Vvardenfell, the setting originally playable in the 2002 video game The Elder Scrolls III: Morrowind. Unlike previous DLC, Morrowind was initially sold separately and was purchaseable with Crown points. It includes a new class, a new trial, and a new player vs. player mode called "Battlegrounds". It was released on June 6, 2017. Morrowind was subsequently introduced to the Crown Store by Bethesda during the June/July 2018 sale and is now included with the base game.

==== Summerset ====
On March 21, 2018, an expansion entitled Summerset was announced. The expansion is based around Summerset Isle, a setting that has not been playable since the 1994 game The Elder Scrolls: Arena. Summerset introduces a new zone, a new story line, jewelry crafting, and a new skill line based on the Psijic Order. A new trial, Cloudrest, was also launched. The expansion was released on May 21, 2018, for Windows and macOS, and on June 5, 2018, for PlayStation 4 and Xbox One.

==== Elsweyr ====
On January 15, 2019, an expansion entitled Elsweyr was announced. The expansion takes place in Elsweyr, home of the Khajiit, a setting that has not been playable since The Elder Scrolls: Arena. It introduced a necromancer class and a new storyline involving dragons. A new trial, Sunspire, was launched. The expansion pack was released on June 4, 2019, for all platforms.

==== Greymoor ====
On January 16, 2020, an expansion entitled Greymoor was announced. The expansion takes place in Skyrim, which previously featured as the setting for the 2011 game The Elder Scrolls V: Skyrim. A new zone, Western Skyrim, was introduced along with a new system called Antiquities, a storyline involving vampires, and a new 12-player cooperative trial called Kyne's Aegis. The expansion was released on May 26, 2020, for Windows and macOS, and on June 10, 2020, for PlayStation 4 and Xbox One.

==== Blackwood ====
On January 26, 2021, an expansion entitled Blackwood was announced. The expansion is based in an area encompassing both Cyrodiil and Black Marsh. The story surrounds the Daedric Prince Mehrunes Dagon's nefarious plans for Tamriel. The expansion introduced a new zone to explore, Blackwood, along with a new Companions system and a trial called Rockgrove. The expansion was released on June 1, 2021, for PC and on June 8, 2021, for consoles.

==== High Isle ====
On January 27, 2022, an expansion entitled High Isle was announced. High Isle is based around the Systres archipelago, located in the seas to the west of Tamriel, and is an entirely new region that had not previously been explored in any Elder Scrolls media (though it was first identified on the in-game map in the 1998 game, Redguard). The expansion's story centers around an attempt by the three warring alliances to negotiate an end to the conflict in secret while being plotted against by a group known as the Ascendant Order. The expansion introduced two new playable zones to explore, the eponymous High Isle and another island called Amenos, as well as a new card-based minigame called Tales of Tribute, a new trial called Dreadsail Reef, and two new companions. The expansion was released on June 6, 2022, for PC and Mac, and on June 21, 2022, for consoles.

==== Necrom ====
On January 25, 2023, an expansion entitled Necrom was announced. It was released on June 5, 2023, on Windows and macOS, and on June 20, 2023, for PlayStation 4, PlayStation 5, Xbox Series X/S, and Xbox One.

==== Gold Road ====
On January 18, 2024, an expansion entitled Gold Road was announced. It is part of the Shadow Over Morrowind multi-year story arc, and was released on June 3, 2024, for PC and Mac, and June 18, 2024, for Consoles.

=== Other downloadable content ===
==== The Imperial City ====
On June 14, 2015, at the Bethesda showcase at E3, downloadable content (DLC) was announced for the Imperial City, the capital of Cyrodiil. It was released for Windows and OS X on August 31, 2015, for the Xbox One on September 15, and for the PlayStation 4 on September 16. It introduced a new currency known as Tel Var Stones, a vast sewer system running throughout the city that adds a unique close-quarter PvP experience, and added the game's largest dungeon at that time, The Imperial City Prison. The city itself is overrun by the forces of Daedric Prince Molag Bal, with every district and the central White-Gold Tower being merged into his realm.

==== Infinite Archive ====
Infinite Archive is the fortieth major update patch and introduces a two-person PvE-arena. The update was released on the live server in the winter of 2023.

=== Zone Update ===
==== Orsinium ====
At the E3 showcase, the new zone of Wrothgar was announced in a DLC called Orsinium, the kingdom and capital of the Orsimer (Orcs). The DLC was released in November 2015, and introduces a solo challenge known as the Maelstrom Arena. The questline involves assisting the Orcish King Kurog with rebuilding the city of Orsinium.

==== Thieves Guild ====
The Thieves Guild DLC was revealed by ZeniMax in a livestream to be set in a new area, Hew's Bane in Hammerfell, featuring an all-new quest line and new game mechanics. The DLC was released in March 2016.

==== Dark Brotherhood ====
The 2015 E3 trailer ended with a note with a black hand on it that states, "We Know", a reference to the guild of assassins known as the Dark Brotherhood featured in previous Elder Scrolls games. The Dark Brotherhood DLC takes place on the Gold Coast of Cyrodiil, and introduces new story content and gameplay mechanics. It was released on May 31, 2016, for Windows, and on June 14, 2016, for PlayStation 4 and Xbox One. It was made available on the Public Test Server on April 25, 2016. In addition to the Dark Brotherhood questline, the release of the expansion saw the removal of the Veteran Progression System, a new system of poison crafting, and quality of life changes for The Elder Scrolls Online Plus subscribers, including "craft bags", which allow subscribers to store crafting materials without taking up space in their inventory.

==== Clockwork City ====
Announced along with Horns of the Reach on June 12, 2017, Clockwork City was eventually released on October 23 for Windows and MacOS, and on November 11 for Xbox One and PlayStation 4. This DLC takes players to a new zone, a realm of brass and artificial life forms. The Clockwork City is the domain of Sotha Sil.

==== Murkmire ====
Murkmire was released in late October 2018, and concerns a previously unexplored region of Black Marsh, where the story is about a dead clan of Argonians.

==== Dragonhold ====
Dragonhold brings the year-long Season of the Dragon storyline to a conclusion with content including the Southern Elsweyr zone and new quests. It was released for Windows and MacOS on October 21, 2019.

==== Markarth ====
Markarth was released on November 2, 2020, for Windows, MacOS, and Stadia, and on November 10, 2020, for Xbox One and PS4. It brings the year-long Dark Heart of Skyrim storyline to an end with the introduction of The Reach zone, has a new solo arena, and has a new item collection system.

==== The Deadlands ====
The Deadlands, released on November 1, 2021, concluded the Gates of Oblivion storyline with the introduction of the Deadlands zone.

==== Firesong ====
Firesong was released on November 1, 2022. The setting of the game is in Galen and moves forward into new areas throughout the Systres archipelago.

=== Dungeon updates ===
==== Shadows of the Hist ====
Director Matt Firor said that the last DLC for 2016 would be Argonian-themed. Further information was later released, including the title Shadows of the Hist. The DLC includes two new dungeons: the Cradle of Shadows and Ruins of Mazzatun, and was released in August 2016.

==== Horns of the Reach ====
Horns of the Reach was announced on June 12, 2017. The DLC includes two new dungeons, Bloodroot Forge and Falkreath Hold, and was released on August 14, 2017, for Windows and MacOS, and on August 25 for consoles.

==== Dragon Bones ====
Dragon Bones is a dungeon pack and includes two new dungeons, Fang Lair and Scalecaller Peak. Both include cabals of necromancers, an undead dragon raised by their leader, and an awakened Dragon Priest intending to release a deadly plague. The pack was released for Windows on February 12, 2018, and for consoles on February 27.

==== Wolfhunter ====
Wolfhunter is a dungeon pack announced on June 10, 2018, and released on August 13 for Windows and MacOS, and on August 28 for Xbox One and PlayStation 4. It includes two dungeons, "Moon Hunter Keep" and "March of Sacrifices", both centered around werewolves.

==== Wrathstone ====
Wrathstone features a quest in which players must obtain two parts of a mysterious tablet. The DLC includes two new dungeons: Frostvault and Depths of Malatar. It was announced on January 15, 2019, and was released for Windows and MacOS on February 25, 2019, and for PS4 and Xbox One on March 12, 2019.

==== Scalebreaker ====
Scalebreaker is a dungeon pack and includes two new dungeons: Moongrave Fane and Lair of Maarselok. It was released for Windows on August 12, 2019.

==== Harrowstorm ====
Harrowstorm was released on February 24, 2020, for Windows and MacOS, and March 10, 2020, for Xbox One and PS4. It includes two dungeons, Icereach and Unhallowed Grave, which introduce the storyline of the Dark Heart of Skyrim.

==== Stonethorn ====
Stonethorn was released on August 24, 2020, for Windows, MacOS, and Stadia, and on September 1, 2020, for Xbox One and PS4. It includes two dungeons, Castle Thorn and Stone Garden, which continue the Dark Heart of Skyrim storyline.

==== Flames of Ambition ====
Flames of Ambition was released on March 8, 2021, for Windows, MacOS, and Stadia, and on March 16, 2021, for Xbox One and PS4. It includes two dungeons, Black Drake Villa and The Cauldron, and begins The Gates of Oblivion storyline, which is planned to continue in the Blackwood Chapter.

==== Waking Flame ====
Waking Flame is a dungeon DLC released on August 23, 2021, which will continue the Gates of Oblivion storyline following the Blackwood Chapter. The DLC includes two new dungeons: Red Petal Bastion and The Dread Cellar.

==== Ascending Tide ====
Ascending Tide is a dungeon pack DLC containing two new group dungeons, Coral Aerie and Shipwright's Regret. It is the first part of the Legacy of the Bretons year-long adventure. It was released on March 14, 2022, for Windows and MacOS.

==== Lost Depths ====
Lost Depths is a dungeon pack DLC containing two new group dungeons, Earthen Root Enclave and Graven Deep. It was released on August 22, 2022, for PC, and on September 6, 2022, for consoles.

==== Scribes of Fate ====
Scribes of Fate is a dungeon-based DLC containing two new group dungeons, Scrivener's Hall and Bal Sunnar. It is the first part of the Shadow Over Morrowind story arc and was released on March 13, 2023.

==== Scions of Ithelia ====
Scions of Ithelia is a dungeon pack DLC containing two new dungeons, Oathsworn Pit and Bedlam Veil. It was released on March 11, 2024, for PC and MacOS, and on March 26 for Xbox and PlayStation consoles.

==== Fallen Banners ====
Fallen Banners is a dungeon DLC with two 4-player PvE dungeons Exiled Redoubt and Lep Seclusa. The DLC has been made available through the Content Pass and Crowns that are available for purchase in the Crown Store.

==== Feast of Shadows ====
Feast of Shadows is a dungeon-based DLC featuring two new dungeons: Black Gem Foundry and Naj-Caldeesh. The DLC was released on August 18, 2025, for PC and Mac, and on September 3, 2025, for Xbox and PlayStation consoles.

=== Content updates ===
==== One Tamriel ====
In June 2016, a new content update, titled One Tamriel, was announced. The update changed the core gameplay to allow players to play quests, explore areas, and group up with others without previously implemented restrictions. The update was released in October 2016.

==== Homestead ====
In October 2016, Firor announced that player housing would be coming to the game in 2017. It was released on February 6, 2017, as part of update 13. There are over 40 different types of houses available; homes are styled after the game's ten playable races, and they come in furnished or unfurnished versions, which can be bought using in-game gold or with real money using crowns.

=== Champion system redesign ===
In March 2021, a major change called Update 29 was released. It significantly altered the late game advancement system called Champion Points. It expanded the cap from 810 to 3,600 Champion Points. Numerous changes were made to equipment and skills.

== Reception ==
Reception

Aggregate score
| Aggregator | Score |
|---|---|
| Metacritic | PC: 71/100; PC (Tamriel Unlimited): 80/100; PS4: 74/100; XONE: 77/100 |

Review scores
| Publication | Score |
|---|---|
| GameRevolution | 4/5 |
| GameSpot | 6/10 |
| IGN | 8/10 |
| PC Gamer (US) | 68/100 |
| Polygon | 6/10 |

=== Original release ===
The Elder Scrolls Online received "mixed or average" reviews from critics for the PC version, according to review aggregator website Metacritic. PC Gamer gave it a score of 68/100, writing that it is "an MMORPG of moderate scope with a few good ideas" but cautioning that "'okay' isn't good enough when you're facing down this much of a premium."

ZeniMax addressed many of the game's early criticisms and released major updates. In January 2015, they announced that the game would no longer be using a subscription model, becoming effective March 17, 2015. ZeniMax also announced that it would be coming to PlayStation 4 and Xbox One on June 9, 2015, and that it would be rebranded as The Elder Scrolls Online: Tamriel Unlimited.

Summerset won the award for "Outstanding Video Game" at the 30th GLAAD Media Awards. The game was nominated for the "Still Playing" award at the 2019 Golden Joystick Awards, and Elsweyr was nominated for the "Best Game Expansion" award.

=== Tamriel Unlimited ===
Tamriel Unlimited received "generally favorable" reviews from critics for the PC and Xbox One versions, while the PlayStation 4 version received "mixed or average" reviews according to Metacritic. Eurogamer's Dan Whitehead reviewed the game, saying that "For fans eager for a new fix all these years on from Skyrim, that may well be enough. The ability to share the adventure, somewhat clumsily, with friends is both a selling point and a pitfall, but those who concentrate their efforts on the Alliance War will find the experience worthwhile."

=== Sales and user base ===
The Elder Scrolls Online was the top-selling game in the United Kingdom for the week of April 5, 2014, for individual formats, and number two across all formats. When the game was released on consoles, the game once again became the top-selling game in the United Kingdom for the week of June 15, 2015, across all formats, becoming the year's second best-selling game at retail. The game was ranked the best-selling downloadable PlayStation 4 game of June 2015 in the United States and Europe. In the United States, it was the second and sixth best-selling game of June and July 2015, respectively.

In February 2017, it was announced that the game had sold over 8.5 million units and had around one million monthly active players. In June 2017, it was announced the game had over 10 million players since release, and around 2.5 million monthly active players. In June 2019, it was announced that the game had reached 13.5 million players lifetime. As of January 2020, over 15 million units had been sold. Pete Hines called The Elder Scrolls Online the most successful Bethesda game from 2017 to 2021. By 2024, the game had generated $2 billion in revenue.

=== Accolades ===
The Elder Scrolls Online was nominated for Evolving Game at the 19th British Academy Games Awards in 2023.
