= ZeniMax Online Studios =

American video game developer

ZeniMax Online Studios LLC
- Type: Subsidiary
- Industry: Video games
- Founded: August 1, 2007; 19 years ago
- Founder: Matt Firor
- Headquarters: Hunt Valley, Maryland, US
- Number of locations: 2 (2026)
- Key people: Josh Henderson (co-studio head); Nick Giacomini (co-studio head)
- Products: The Elder Scrolls Online
- Number of employees: 186 (2026)
- Parent: ZeniMax Media
- Divisions: ZeniMax Online Studios Hungary
- Website: zenimaxonline.com

ZeniMax Online Studios LLC is an American video game developer and a subsidiary of ZeniMax Media, specializing in massively multiplayer online games. The company developed The Elder Scrolls Online and its downloadable content. In 2025, it had over 461 employees before undergoing a round of layoffs. Its main studio is located in Hunt Valley, Maryland, and it also operates a satellite studio in Budapest, Hungary. Additionally, ZeniMax Online Studios has locations in Austin, San Diego, Seattle, and Wisconsin.

== History ==
=== 2007–2018: Formation, The Elder Scrolls Online ===
The formation of ZeniMax Online Studios was announced by ZeniMax Media on August 1, 2007, to be headed by Matt Firor, a massively multiplayer online game designer and veteran of Mythic Entertainment.

The company was built to specialize in the creation of a massively multiplayer online game. In 2007 the company announced a partnership with Simutronics for the use of HeroEngine. In June 2008, ZeniMax Online Studios moved into its current office in Hunt Valley. On March 15, 2010, ZeniMax Online Studios announced that it will be using the Fork Particle SDK to create the particle effects in its unannounced upcoming massively multiplayer game. On March 15, 2011, ZeniMax Online Studios announced plans to open a customer support center in Galway, Ireland. The company's new facility will provide customer support for players of their future massively multiplayer online games and is expected to result in the creation of hundreds of jobs over the next several years. On August 8, 2011, ZeniMax Online Studios selected Splunk to be its platform for business intelligence, network operations monitoring, and operational intelligence. On March 6, 2012, ZeniMax Online Studios signed a licensing deal with Elastic Path Software. On May 3, 2012, Game Informer announced that ZeniMax Online Studios's video game in development will take place in The Elder Scrolls universe, approximately a millennium before the events of The Elder Scrolls V: Skyrim. The game, The Elder Scrolls Online, was released in 2014. The Ireland branch effectively shut down in 2015.

By 2012, the company employed 250 people.

The studio also did additional work on Doom and Fallout 76, which are other titles published by Bethesda.

=== 2018–2024: New intellectual property, Microsoft, Company expansion ===
In 2018, ZeniMax began to work on a new Triple-A MMO game codenamed Blackbird, a third-person online looter-shooter that placed a heavy emphasis on vertical movement. It was to be a brand new IP set within a new franchise with a sci-fi, noir aesthetic, similar to Blade Runner. In December 2020, ZeniMax Online Studios formed a satellite office in San Diego to work on an original intellectual property. Ben Jones, Creative Director at ZeniMax Online Studios publicly stated in October 2022 that the company was developing the new IP for four and a half years with a team of about 200 people. ZeniMax Media was acquired by Microsoft for US$7.5 billion in March 2021 and became part of Microsoft Gaming.

ZeniMax Media purchased Hungarian studio Nemesys Games in 2022, and rebranded them as ZeniMax Online Studios Hungary.

300 QA testers, a majority at ZeniMax Online Studios voted to unionize as "ZeniMax Workers United-CWA" in January 2023. 461 designers, engineers, graphics artists and developers at ZeniMax Online Studios unionized as "ZOS United-CWA" in December 2024. Microsoft signed a labor-neutrality agreement in 2024, agreeing not to interfere with any unionization efforts in any ZeniMax Media subsidiary.

=== 2025–present: Layoffs and restructuring ===
"This carcass of workers that remains is somehow supposed to keep shipping award-winning games. I don't really know [how that works] … Microsoft just took everything that could have been great about the culture and collaboration and decimated it."

— Autumn Mitchell, senior QA tester at ZeniMax

In March 2025, insiders reported that Xbox executives were blown away by ZeniMax's upcoming MMO Project Blackbird, with nothing but complimentary words for the project. The team for the game had expanded to 300 people by this time, and was aiming to release in 2028.

In May 2025, Microsoft and ZeniMax Online Studios reached an agreement with employees associated with the ZOS United-CWA union about raising minimum wages and instituting a new credit policy after they threatened a strike. In July 2025, the studio underwent a round of layoffs as part of company-wide layoffs at Microsoft, with the unnamed Blackbird MMO in development at the studio being canceled and Joseph Burba replacing Matt Firor as the studio head. In January 2026, Firor confirmed that his sudden resignation was caused by the cancellation of Blackbird and mass layoffs of employees, calling Blackbird the game he had "waited his entire career to create". Many employees were initially unsure if they had been laid off due to a lack of communication from Microsoft, finding themselves unexpectedly locked out of their email and Slack accounts with no prior notice. Amid the layoffs, Microsoft Gaming CEO Phil Spencer boasted about how their gaming division had "never looked stronger", while former developers at the company spoke of how the remaining team members were understaffed and morale was at an extreme low.

In July 2026, a new round of layoffs across Microsoft has affected 213 employees working on The Elder Scrolls Online. Studio head Joseph Burba was among the layoffs. It has been announced that ZeniMax Online Studios will partner closely with Bethesda Game Studios on The Elder Scrolls franchise.

== Games developed ==
Year	Title	Platform(s)	Notes
2014	The Elder Scrolls Online	macOS, Microsoft Windows, PlayStation 4, Xbox One, PlayStation 5, Xbox Series X, Stadia	
2016	Doom	Microsoft Windows, PlayStation 4, Xbox One, Nintendo Switch, Google Stadia	Additional work
2018	Fallout 76	Microsoft Windows, PlayStation 4, Xbox One	Additional work

== Cancelled games ==
Title	Platform(s)	Notes
Commander Keen	Android, iOS	Cancelled
Project Blackbird (Note: production name)	Unknown	Cancelled
