= Wayne Gretzky Hockey 3 =

1992 video game

- Developer: Bethesda Softworks
- Publisher: Bethesda Softworks
- Platform: MS-DOS
- Release: October 1992
- Genre: Sports (ice hockey)
- Mode: Single-player

Wayne Gretzky Hockey 3 is an ice hockey-themed sports video game developed and published by Bethesda Softworks. It was released for MS-DOS in 1992, then as part of Gretzky Gold: The Collector's Edition in 1993.

== Gameplay ==
The game offers a 3/4 view of the players. Wayne Gretzky Hockey 3 is a hockey simulation game in which players can choose between a press box view for managing teams and rosters or a 3/4 rink view for gameplay. The game offers extensive customization, including modifying player attributes, selecting NHL teams from the 1992 season, and even renaming players. Gameplay involves controlling one player at a time, with the option to let the computer handle coaching decisions or manually manage strategies using the Coach's Clipboard. Players can adjust game settings such as match length, penalties, fights, and referee choices.

== Release ==
The game was published in 1992. A package containing the game and Hockey League Simulator 2 was released in August 1993 as Gretzky Gold: The Collector's Edition. In addition to both games, the package includes a photo of Wayne Gretzky.

== Reception ==
Reception

Review scores
Publication	Score
Game Players	4.5/5
Pelit	92/100
PC Player	65/100
Power Play Magazine	92/100"
PC Zone	69/100
PC Joker	78%

PC Player rated the game a 65 of 100 stating that "Occasional sports players should also be warned about the third Wayne Gretzky program. The ice hustle and bustle seems a bit too hectic and tiring if you don't really want to “get used to it”. Ice hockey fans who can delight in features such as the line-up editor are offered the currently most competent simulation of this sport on PCs".

Power Play magazine rated the game a 92 of 100 stating that "Wayne Gretzky Hockey 3 is without a doubt the best ice hockey simulation for PC. Like its predecessors, the game correctly adheres to the ice hockey rules and offers fans a realistic simulation of their favorite sport. Thanks to a flood of options, both beginners and ice hockey veterans will have a lot of fun with it. For example, the speed can be regulated continuously or the referee declared a blind hen. Graphically, Wayne Gretzky Hockey 3 shines in previously unfamiliar VGA splendor. The new 3-D perspective in particular is beautifully drawn. The players are very nicely animated, but without a fast computer they run across the ice with chills. Music and sound effects have also increased tremendously in quality and quantity compared to their predecessors."

=== Sales ===
The game was regarded by Christopher Weaver in 1997 as one of the most popular Bethesda Softworks games along with The Terminator 2029 and The Elder Scrolls series.
