= IHRA Drag Racing 2 =

2002 video game

- Developer: Bethesda Softworks
- Publisher: Bethesda Softworks
- Series: IHRA Drag Racing
- Platform: PlayStation 2
- Release: 2002
- Genre: Racing

IHRA Drag Racing 2 is a 2002 video game from Bethesda Softworks.

== Gameplay ==
IHRA Drag Racing includes drag racing stars driving their IHRA professional and sportsman cars on actual 1/4 and 1/8 mile tracks. The player can choose from over 50 cars in the categories of classic, late model, funny cars, pro stock, pro mod, and top fuel. The player can use the shop area in the game to design a custom drag racer using ready-made parts or the player can make custom designs. The game includes details such as engine RPM speed, temperature indicators for the tires and engine, and Line Lock for the front tires to allow the rear tires maximum burnout. The game includes both day and night racing and detailed weather and atmospheric conditions.

== Development ==
The game was first mentioned in March 2000. It was showcased at E3 2001.

== Reception ==
Reception

Review scores
Publication	Score
All Game Guide	2.5/5
GameSpot	5.4/10
PSX Nation	5/10

GameSpot said "While IHRA Drag Racing 2 does a great job of representing the sport of drag racing, it doesn't necessarily make for the greatest game".

The game sold over 100,000 copies.
