= The Elder Scrolls Travels =

Role-playing video game series

The Elder Scrolls Travels is a series of portable role-playing video games in The Elder Scrolls series, primarily developed and published by Vir2L Studios. The series consists of Stormhold (2003), Dawnstar (2003), Shadowkey (2004), Oblivion Mobile (2006) and the cancelled Oblivion for the PlayStation Portable.

== Stormhold ==
The Elder Scrolls Travels: Stormhold
- Developer: Vir2L Studios
- Publishers: Vir2L Studios; Mforma
- Platforms: J2ME, BREW
- Release: 2003
- Genre: Role-playing
- Mode: Single-player

The Elder Scrolls Travels: Stormhold is a role-playing video game developed for J2ME and BREW devices, in the style of the games from the main The Elder Scrolls series. Like the other two titles in The Elder Scrolls Travels series, it was developed and published by Vir2L Studios.

== Dawnstar ==
The Elder Scrolls Travels: Dawnstar
- Developer: Vir2L Studios
- Publisher: Vir2L Studios
- Platforms: J2ME, BREW
- Release: 2003
- Genre: Role-playing
- Mode: Single-player

The Elder Scrolls Travels: Dawnstar is a role-playing video game developed for J2ME and BREW devices, in the style of the games from the main The Elder Scrolls series. Like the other two titles in The Elder Scrolls Travels series, it was developed and published by Vir2L Studios.

== Shadowkey ==
The Elder Scrolls Travels: Shadowkey is a role-playing game developed by Vir2L Studios exclusively for N-Gage.

The Elder Scrolls Travels: Shadowkey received generally mixed reviews from critics, and holds a score of 59 on Metacritic.

Avery Score of GameSpot criticized the game's controls, combat system, and short draw distance, feeling the gameplay to be "crippled" by N-Gage's technological limitations. He also dismissed the storyline as "unremarkable", but praised the game's co-op multiplayer mode and the use of the soundtrack from Morrowind.

== Oblivion Mobile ==
The Elder Scrolls Travels: Oblivion
- Developer: Vir2L Studios
- Publishers: Bethesda Softworks, ZeniMax Media
- Platform: Java-enabled cell phones
- Release: May 2, 2006
- Genre: Role-playing
- Mode: Single-player

Oblivion Mobile (officially The Elder Scrolls Travels: Oblivion) is an Elder Scrolls Travels game available on Java-enabled cell phones. It follows the storyline established in the console and PC versions of Oblivion.

=== Gameplay ===
Gameplay is handled with the numeric touchpad as well as the normal game action keys. Oblivion Mobile includes ten main levels and four optional quests. Eight classes are available to choose from, and each has access to different armor, weapons, and spells, as well as a number of items available to them all. The mobile version is played from an isometric perspective while mostly retaining the same gameplay as its console and computer counterparts.

== Oblivion (PlayStation Portable) ==
The Elder Scrolls Travels: Oblivion
- Developer: Climax Group London
- Publishers: Bethesda Softworks, ZeniMax Media
- Platform: PlayStation Portable
- Genre: Role-playing
- Mode: Single-player

The Elder Scrolls Travels: Oblivion is a role-playing video game developed for the PlayStation Portable, in the style of the games from the main The Elder Scrolls series. It was never released. Six beta builds can be found online.
