= XCar: Experimental Racing =

1997 video game

Xatax
- Cover art
- Developer: MediaTech West
- Publisher: Bethesda Softworks
- Programmer: Brent Erickson
- Engine: XnGine
- Platform: DOS
- Release: NA: August 22, 1997
- Genre: Racing
- Mode: Single-player

XCar: Experimental Racing is a video game developed by MediaTech West and published by Bethesda Softworks for DOS on August 22, 1997.

== Gameplay ==
XCar: Experimental Racing is a game in which sports prototype vehicles are used for a high-tech racing simulator. The game features 16 advanced cars and 10 diverse tracks, ranging from Mayan jungles to American deserts. It includes vehicle customization options, including different engines (with an optional engine editor), a paint shop, and telemetry tools for fine-tuning performance.

== Development ==
Development on the game started as early as 1995. The game was originally set to release in January 1997 but the release date was pushed to mid August 1997. The game's director of development was Brent Erickson. The development took 8 full time team members.

The game used SciTech Software's Display Doctor Technology.

== Reception ==
Reception

Review scores
Publication	Score
CNET Gamecenter	7/10
Computer Games Strategy Plus	3/5
Computer Gaming World	4/5
GameRevolution	B
GameSpot	6.2/10
GameStar	60%
Génération 4	2/6
Next Generation	3/5
PC Gamer (US)	68%
PC PowerPlay	61%
Chicago Tribune	3/5

The game received average reviews. Next Generation said, "There are an awful lot of racing titles out there, nearly all aimed at enthusiasts of one particular circuit or class of car. XCar has no license to speak of, throwing out any sort of endorsement in favor of raw performance and[,] above all, speed. For players who just want to go fast, it delivers."

Dennis Lynda of Chicago Tribune said, "If you're a would-be mechanic you will love this complex and intricately detailed game, but others will find their heads spinning long after the tires stop." Bad Hare of GamePro said, "XCar requires a driver's precision and a mechanic's sensibility – in other words, it's perfect for serious fans of Papyrus' ultra-real racing sims. If you don't enjoy the details, steer clear – this one ain't for casual Sunday drivers." (Note: GamePro gave the game a perfect 5/5 for graphics, and three 4/5 scores for sound, control, and fun factor.)

XCar: Experimental Racing was a finalist in the Best Sports Software Game category in the 1998 CODiE Awards.
