= Flashpoint Productions =

American video game developer

Flashpoint Productions, Inc.
- Type: Subsidiary
- Industry: Video games
- Founded: 1992
- Founder: Brent Erickson
- Defunct: Unknown
- Headquarters: Olympia, Washington, US
- Number of employees: 9 (1998)
- Parent: Bethesda Softworks (from 1995)

Flashpoint Productions, Inc. was a video game developer based in Olympia, Washington.

== History ==
Founded by Brent Erickson in Utah in 1992. In July 1994, the company moved from Utah to Lacey and at the time had 18 employees. The firm produced musical scores used in network broadcast news shows and Entertainment Tonight.

Bethesda Softworks acquired Flashpoint in July 1995 and rebranded it Media Technology West. The studio was also referred to as MediaTech West and Bethesda West. Erickson felt Bethesda shared his philosophy and subsequently became the company's development director.

Under Bethesda, the studio developed the IHRA Drag Racing games.

== Games developed or Co-developed ==
Year	Title	Platform(s)	Publisher
1994	Noctropolis	MS-DOS, Windows, Linux, Classic Mac OS	Electronic Arts, Night Dive Studios
1995	Golf Magazine: 36 Great Holes Starring Fred Couples	32X	Sega
1995	PBA Bowling	Windows	Bethesda Softworks
1996	The Elder Scrolls II: Daggerfall	MS-DOS	Bethesda Softworks
1996	Skynet	MS-DOS	Bethesda Softworks
1997	XCar: Experimental Racing	MS-DOS	Bethesda Softworks
1998	Burnout Championship Drag Racing	MS-DOS	Bethesda Softworks
