= Brent Erickson =

American video game designer

Brent Erickson is an American computer and video game developer.

== Career ==
Erickson has been programming computer games since he was 12. At the age of 13, he produced/published a text-based adventure game called "Trek For Riches" for the TRS-80.

In 1992, he founded Flashpoint Productions, which was sold to Bethesda Softworks in 1995.

Erickson has been credited in over 50 software titles, including such products as Martian Memorandum, Mean Streets, and the extremely popular golf simulation program, Links.

== Personal life ==
He lived in Steilacoom as a child before his family moved to Salt Lake City. He attended the University of Utah for four years, but never graduated.

== Credits ==
Year	Title	Credited as	System(s)
1994	Noctropolis	Co-Writer, Co-Designer and Co-Creator	MS-DOS, Windows, Linux, macOS
1997	XCar: Experimental Racing	Director of Development	MS-DOS
1998	Burnout: Championship Drag Racing	Lead Designer	MS-DOS
1999	NIRA Intense Import Drag Racing	Producer	Windows
Cancelled	Skip Barber Racing	Lead Designer	Windows
