= ZeniMax Media =

American media company

ZeniMax Media Inc.
- Logo used since 2014
- Type: Subsidiary
- Industry: Video games
- Predecessor: Media Technology Limited
- Founded: 1999; 27 years ago
- Founders: Christopher Weaver; Robert A. Altman
- Headquarters: Rockville, Maryland, US
- Total equity: US$2.5 billion (2016)
- Number of employees: 2,300+ (2020)
- Parent: Microsoft (2021–2022); Xbox (2022–present)
- Subsidiaries: Arkane Studios; Bethesda Softworks; id Software; Obsidian Entertainment; MachineGames; ZeniMax Online Studios
- Website: zenimax.com

ZeniMax Media Inc. is an American video game holding company based in Rockville, Maryland. The company was founded in 1999 by Christopher Weaver and Robert A. Altman as the parent company for Weaver's video game publisher Bethesda Softworks. The company additionally owns the development studios Bethesda Game Studios (The Elder Scrolls, Fallout, and Starfield), id Software (Doom, Quake, and Rage), Arkane Studios (Dishonored, Prey, and Redfall), MachineGames (Wolfenstein), Obsidian Entertainment (Grounded, Fallout: New Vegas) and ZeniMax Online Studios (The Elder Scrolls Online). Microsoft acquired ZeniMax Media for $8.1 billion in March 2021 and operates it under the Xbox division.

== History ==
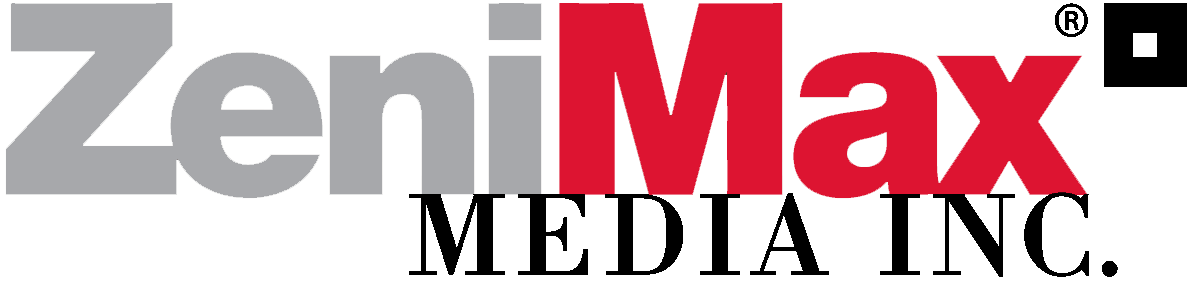
ZeniMax Media, Inc. logo used from 1999 to 2014

=== Formation, investments, and growth (1999–2007) ===
Christopher Weaver, the founder of the video game publisher Bethesda Softworks, and Robert A. Altman, a lawyer, founded ZeniMax Media in 1999. The name is a portmanteau of "zenith" and "maximum". The company was established to succeed Media Technology Limited as the parent company of Bethesda Softworks. Weaver brought Altman onboard as the chief executive officer, contributing his stock in Bethesda Softworks so that ZeniMax Media would be able to obtain funding. Weaver served as the chief technology officer from 1999 to 2002, when he moved into a non-executive role. Later that year, he filed a lawsuit against ZeniMax, alleging breach of contract and claiming he was owed US$1.2 million in severance pay. By February 2007, Weaver only held a 33% stake in the company, which by 2020 had been reduced to "a pittance of the stock".

Among the original board members were Harry E. Sloan, Les Moonves, and Robert Trump. In 2000, SBS Broadcasting Group, operated by Sloan, acquired a 12.5% stake in ZeniMax as part of a partnership between the two companies. Among the partnerships between the companies, ZeniMax's subsidiary e-Nexus Studios developed entertainment portals and websites for SBS. In the same year, Terry McAuliffe, George Mitchell, Dean Devlin, and Jon Feltheimer joined ZeniMax as advisors. The company acquired the Fallout franchise from Interplay Entertainment in 2004.

In August 2007, ZeniMax announced the formation of the studio ZeniMax Online Studios, led by Matt Firor. In October, after ProSiebenSat.1 Media purchased SBS Broadcasting Group and inherited its stake in ZeniMax Media, now 9% of the shares, ProSiebenSat.1 Media announced it would intensify its relationship with ZeniMax. The company launched SevenGames.com, the international edition of its German-language game platform, in December and worked with ZeniMax to develop online games. In the same year, Providence Equity Partners bought a 25% stake in ZeniMax for $300 million. ZeniMax had 200 employees in October 2007. It acquired the Prey and Rage franchise in 2009. After Providence Equity Partners invested another $150 million for an undisclosed stake in 2010, the company grew to 400 employees by January 2011. ZeniMax subsequently announced a partnership with the University of Southern California School of Cinematic Arts to support its Interactive Media Division with a comprehensive educational program of guest lectures and internships.

=== Litigation with Oculus VR (2014–2017) ===
In May 2014, ZeniMax sent a letter to Facebook and its Oculus VR subsidiary, asserting that any contributions John Carmack made to the Oculus Rift project were the intellectual property of ZeniMax, stating that "ZeniMax provided necessary VR technology and other valuable assistance to Palmer Luckey and other Oculus employees in 2012 and 2013 to make the Oculus Rift a viable VR product, superior to other VR market offerings." The company filed a lawsuit against Oculus VR later that month. In June, Oculus VR filed a response to the lawsuit, stating that ZeniMax was falsely claiming ownership to take advantage of its acquisition by Facebook. Oculus VR also claimed that the Oculus Rift did not share any code or technology with ZeniMax's. A jury ruled in favor of ZeniMax in February 2017. They found that, while Oculus VR had not misappropriated ZeniMax's trade secrets, it had violated ZeniMax's copyrights and trademarks in addition to a non-disclosure agreement. ZeniMax was awarded $500 million. In the meantime, ProSiebenSat.1 Media had sold its stake in ZeniMax back to the company for €30 million.

=== Acquisition by Microsoft (2020–present) ===
In September 2020, Microsoft announced it had entered into an agreement to acquire ZeniMax and its subsidiaries for $7.5 billion. For Providence Equity Partners, the deal represented a six-time return on investment. Altman had considered selling ZeniMax for several years and at one point was close to a deal with rival Electronic Arts. Prior the deal's closure, he died on February 3, 2021, aged 73, at a Baltimore hospital. The U.S. Securities and Exchange Commission and the European Commission greenlit the acquisition in March 2021. A preliminary injunction to block the acquisition was being sought in a class-action lawsuit that ZeniMax faced over Fallout 4, with the plaintiffs arguing that Microsoft could shield ZeniMax's assets from damages should it be found liable after the acquisition. Microsoft announced the completion of the acquisition on March 9, 2021. The final cost of the transaction was $8.1 billion. ZeniMax's board of directors was consequently dissolved.

300 QA testers, a majority at ZeniMax Studios voted to unionize as ZeniMax Workers United-CWA in January 2023. This follows the unionization efforts of QA testers at Activision Blizzard which was also acquired by Microsoft. In 2024, Microsoft signed a labor-neutrality agreement with CWA union, agreeing not to interfere with unionization efforts in any ZeniMax Media subsidiaries.

In May 2024, Microsoft announced the impending closures of the ZeniMax studios Arkane Austin, Alpha Dog Games, and Tango Gameworks, as well as Roundhouse Studios' absorption into ZeniMax Online Studios. In July 2024, over 200 Bethesda Game Studios employees unionized with CWA. The wall-to-wall unit was recognized by Microsoft, and includes artists, engineers, programmers, and designers. In August 2024, Krafton agreed to buy Tango Gameworks, preventing its closure.

In July 2026, Microsoft announced a round of layoffs affecting 166 employees at ZeniMax Media.

In September 2026, Xbox transferred Obsidian Entertainment from under Xbox Game Studios to ZeniMax Media.

== Studios ==
- Arkane Studios in Lyon, France; acquired in August 2010.
- Bethesda Softworks in Rockville, Maryland, US; acquired in 1999.
  - Bethesda Game Studios in Rockville, Maryland, US; established in 2001.
    - Bethesda Game Studios Austin in Austin, Texas, US; founded in October 2012 as BattleCry Studios, re-branded in March 2018.
    - Bethesda Game Studios Dallas in Dallas, US; founded in 2007 as Escalation Studios, acquired in February 2017, re-branded in August 2018.
    - Bethesda Game Studios Montreal in Montreal, Canada; established in December 2015.
  - Obsidian Entertainment in Irvine, California, US; shifted to Bethesda Softworks reporting structure in 2026.
- id Software in Richardson, Texas, US; acquired in June 2009.
  - id Software Frankfurt in Frankfurt, Germany; founded in 2015.
- MachineGames in Uppsala, Sweden; acquired in November 2010.
  - MachineGames Sundsvall in Sundsvall, Sweden; founded in 2023.
- ZeniMax Online Studios in Hunt Valley, Maryland, US; founded in 2007.
  - ZeniMax Online Studios Hungary in Budapest, Hungary; founded in 2004 as Nemesys Games, acquired in 2022.

=== Former ===
==== Alpha Dog Games ====
Alpha Dog Games (company name: ZeniMax Halifax Ltd. between 2019 and 2024) is a Canadian mobile video game developer based in Halifax, Nova Scotia.

The company was acquired by ZeniMax Media in October 2019. ZeniMax Media was acquired by Microsoft in March 2021 and became part of Microsoft Gaming. As a result, Alpha Dog Games was owned by Microsoft since 2021, and it was an indirect mobile gaming extension of the Xbox brand. The studio was closed in May 2024 and Mighty Doom was sunset on August 7.

The studio was later revived an independently owned company. Games from the company include Wraithborne, MonstroCity: Rampage and Ninja Golf.

==== Other ====
- Arkane Studios Austin in Austin, Texas, US; acquired in August 2010, closed in 2024.
- e-Nexus Studios (later renamed ZeniMax Productions) in Los Angeles, US; founded in August 1999, headed by former The Simpsons co-creator Sam Simon.
- Mediatech West in Olympia, Washington, US; founded by Brent Erickson in Utah in 1992 as Flashpoint Productions and sold to Media Technology/Bethesda Softworks in 1995. Also referred to as Bethesda West.
- Mud Duck Productions
- Roundhouse Studios in Madison, Wisconsin, US; founded in November 2019, merged into ZeniMax Online Studios in 2024.
- Tango Gameworks in Tokyo, Japan; acquired in October 2010, sold to Krafton in 2024.
- Vir2L Studios based in Washington, D.C., US. It was a provider of complete media solutions and interactive content for the Internet, broadband and wireless. The company developed the games for the Survivor: The Australian Outback series. Games published or developed by Vir2L included Medieval Games, IHRA Drag Racing, The Elder Scrolls Travels, AMF Xtreme Bowling 3D as well as others. Vir2L won a silver award at the Clio Awards, and a Cyber Lions Gold Award.
- XL Translab in Washington, D.C., US; acquired in 1997 by and moved to Bethesda Softworks.
- Visionary Design Technologies; which developed the games Vortex and Datastorm.
