= List of The Elder Scrolls video games =

Comprehensive list of Elder Scrolls video games

The Elder Scrolls is an action role-playing open world video game series developed by Bethesda Game Studios and published by Bethesda Softworks. The Elder Scrolls games take place in the fictional world of Nirn, on the continent of Tamriel. The first game, The Elder Scrolls: Arena, was released in 1994. It was intended for players to assume the role of an arena combatant, but development shifted the game into a role-playing game (RPG), beginning a tradition that persists throughout the series' history. The Elder Scrolls II: Daggerfall was published in 1996, and it featured one of the first true 3D worlds on a large scale, with a game world claimed to be the size of Great Britain. The Elder Scrolls III: Morrowind, released in 2002, saw a return to the old-style expansive and non-linear gameplay, and a shift towards individually detailed landscapes, with a smaller game world than past titles. The game sold over four million units by mid-2005. Two expansions were released between 2002 and 2003: Tribunal and Bloodmoon.

Development of The Elder Scrolls IV: Oblivion began in 2002, and focused on artificial intelligence improvements that interact dynamically with the game world. Released in 2006, the game achieved commercial success and critical acclaim; expansion packs Knights of the Nine and Shivering Isles were released for the game. The Elder Scrolls V: Skyrim followed in November 2011 to critical acclaim. The game is not a direct sequel to its predecessor, Oblivion, but instead takes place 200 years later, in Tamriel's land of Skyrim. Three expansion sets, Dawnguard, Dragonborn and Hearthfire, have been released. The Elder Scrolls Online, a massively multiplayer role-playing video game developed by ZeniMax Online Studios, was announced on May 3, 2012. The game is the first open-ended multiplayer installment of the franchise, and most of the continent of Tamriel is playable in the game. The Elder Scrolls Online had been in development for 5 years prior to its announcement and was released on April 4, 2014.

== Video games ==
Key
Blank cell indicates title was not released on any platform(s) by the specified manufacturers
Cell with games console(s) indicates title was released on platform(s) by the specified manufacturers

=== Main games ===
List of The Elder Scrolls main video games
Title	Release details	Platform(s)		
Title	Release details	Microsoft	Sony	Other
The Elder Scrolls: Arena	Genre: Action role-playing; Publisher: Bethesda Softworks; Release date: March 25, 1994	DOS		
The Elder Scrolls II: Daggerfall	Genre: Action role-playing; Publisher: Bethesda Softworks; Release date: September 20, 1996	DOS		
The Elder Scrolls III: Morrowind	Genre: Action role-playing; Publishers: Bethesda Softworks; Ubisoft (Europe); Release dates: Windows: May 2, 2002; Xbox: June 6, 2002	Windows; Xbox		
The Elder Scrolls IV: Oblivion	Genre: Action role-playing; Publishers: 2K Games (Windows, Xbox 360); Bethesda Softworks (PlayStation 3); Vir2L Studios (Mobile); Release dates: Mobile: May 2, 2006; PlayStation 3: March 20, 2007; Windows: March 20, 2006; Xbox 360: March 20, 2006	Windows; Xbox 360	PlayStation 3	Mobile (Note: The mobile version of The Elder Scrolls IV: Oblivion was developed by Superscape.)
The Elder Scrolls V: Skyrim	Genre: Action role-playing; Publisher: Bethesda Softworks; Release dates: Windows: November 11, 2011; Xbox 360: November 11, 2011; PlayStation 3: November 11, 2011; Special Edition; Playstation 4: October 26, 2016; Xbox One: October 26, 2016; Nintendo Switch: November 17, 2017; PlayStation VR: November 17, 2017; Anniversary Edition; PlayStation 5: November 11, 2021; Xbox Series X and Series S: November 11, 2021	Windows; Xbox 360; Xbox One; Xbox Series X and Series S	PlayStation 3 PlayStation 4 PlayStation 5	Nintendo Switch; Nintendo Switch 2
The Elder Scrolls VI: Sentinel	Genre: Unknown (Presumably action role-playing); Publisher: Bethesda Softworks; Xbox Game Studios; Release date: TBA			

=== Expansions and other games ===
List of The Elder Scrolls expansions and other games
Title	Release details	Platform(s)		
Title	Release details	Microsoft	Sony	Other
An Elder Scrolls Legend: Battlespire	Genre: Action role-playing; Publisher: Bethesda Softworks; Release date: November 30, 1997	DOS		
The Elder Scrolls Adventures: Redguard	Genre: Action role-playing; Publisher: Bethesda Softworks; Release date: October 31, 1998	DOS		
The Elder Scrolls III: Tribunal	Genre: Action role-playing; Publisher: Bethesda Softworks; Release date: November 8, 2002	Windows; Xbox (Note: Tribunal and Bloodmoon are both included in the Xbox version of The Elder Scrolls III: Morrowind – Game of the Year Edition.)		
The Elder Scrolls Travels: Stormhold	Genre: Action role-playing; Publisher: Bethesda Softworks; Release date: August 1, 2003			Mobile
The Elder Scrolls III: Bloodmoon	Genre: Action role-playing; Publisher: Bethesda Softworks; Release date: June 4, 2003	Windows; Xbox		
The Elder Scrolls Travels: Dawnstar	Genre: Action role-playing; Publisher: Bethesda Softworks; Release date: 2004			Mobile
The Elder Scrolls Travels: Shadowkey	Genre: Action role-playing; Publishers: Vir2L Studios; TKO Software; Release date: November 11, 2004			Mobile (Note: The Elder Scrolls Travels: Shadowkey was developed by Vir2L Studios and TKO Software.)
The Elder Scrolls Travels: Oblivion	Genre: Action role-playing; Publishers: Bethesda Softworks; ZeniMax Media; Release date: May 2, 2006			Mobile
The Elder Scrolls IV: Knights of the Nine	Genre: Action role-playing; Publishers: Bethesda Softworks; Ubisoft (Europe); Release date: November 21, 2006	Windows; Xbox 360 (Note: The Xbox 360 version of The Elder Scrolls IV: Knights of the Nine is only available through Xbox Live Marketplace, or through the Xbox version of The Elder Scrolls IV: Oblivion – Game of the Year Edition.)	PlayStation 3	
The Elder Scrolls IV: Shivering Isles	Genre: Action role-playing; Publishers: Bethesda Softworks; 2K Games; Release dates: PlayStation 3: December 8, 2007; Windows: March 26, 2007; Xbox 360 (digital): March 26, 2007; Xbox 360 (retail): October 16, 2007	Windows; Xbox 360	PlayStation 3	
The Elder Scrolls V: Skyrim – Dawnguard	Genre: Action role-playing; Publisher: Bethesda Softworks; Release dates: PlayStation 3: February 26, 2013; PlayStation 4: November 21, 2016; Windows: August 2, 2012; Xbox 360: June 26, 2012	Windows; Xbox 360	PlayStation 3 Playstation 4	Nintendo Switch
The Elder Scrolls V: Skyrim – Hearthfire	Genre: Action role-playing; Publisher: Bethesda Softworks; Release dates: PlayStation 3: February 19, 2013; PlayStation 4: November 21, 2016; Windows: October 5, 2012; Xbox 360: September 4, 2012	Windows; Xbox 360	PlayStation 3 PlayStation 4	Nintendo Switch
The Elder Scrolls V: Skyrim – Dragonborn	Genre: Action role-playing; Publisher: Bethesda Softworks; Release dates: PlayStation 3: February 12, 2013; PlayStation 4: November 21, 2016; Windows: February 5, 2013; Xbox 360: December 4, 2012	Windows; Xbox 360	PlayStation 3 PlayStation 4	Nintendo Switch
The Elder Scrolls Online	Genre: Action role-playing; Publisher: Bethesda Softworks; Release date: Windows, OS X: April 4, 2014; PlayStation 4, Xbox One: June 9, 2015	Windows (Note: The Elder Scrolls Online is developed by ZeniMax Online Studios.); Xbox One	PlayStation 4	Mac OS
The Elder Scrolls: Legends	Genre: Collectible card; Publisher: Bethesda Softworks; Release date: Windows: March 9, 2017; macOS: May 31, 2017; iOS, Android: July 27, 2017	Windows		macOS iOS; Android
The Elder Scrolls: Blades	Genre: Action role-playing; Publisher: Bethesda Softworks; Release date: Android, iOS: May 12, 2020; Nintendo Switch: May 14, 2020			Android iOS; Nintendo Switch
The Elder Scrolls: Castles	Genre: Construction and management simulation; Publisher: Bethesda Softworks; Release date: Android: September 28, 2023 (early access); Android, iOS: September 10, 2024			Android iOS
The Elder Scrolls IV: Oblivion Remastered	Genre: Action role-playing; Publisher: Bethesda Softworks; Release date: Windows, Xbox Series X/S, PlayStation 5: April 22, 2025	Windows; Xbox Series X/S	PlayStation 5	
