= High Rock =

High Rock may refer to:

== Places in the United States ==
- High Rock (Washington), a mountain
- High Rock Mountain (New Jersey)
- High Rock Lake, reservoir in North Carolina
- High Rock Lake (Nevada)
- High Rock Mountain, Uwharrie Mountains, North Carolina

== Other places ==
- High Rock (Antarctica), nunatak on David Island
- High Rock, Bahamas, former district
- High Rock (Ontario), hill in Canada
- High Rock (South Georgia), rock formation
- High Rock, Malahide, Dublin, Ireland

== Other uses ==
- High Rock, fictional region of Tamriel in The Elder Scrolls

== See also ==
- High Rocks, a geological site in England
- High Rock Farm, plantation house in North Carolina
