= The Elder Scrolls IV: Shivering Isles =

Expansion to the video game The Elder Scrolls IV: Oblivion

- Developer: Bethesda Game Studios
- Publishers: Bethesda Softworks; 2K Games
- Series: The Elder Scrolls
- Engine: Gamebryo
- Platforms: Microsoft Windows; Xbox 360; PlayStation 3
- Release: Windows, Xbox 360: NA: March 26, 2007; EU: March 30, 2007; PlayStation 3: NA: December 8, 2007
- Genre: Action role-playing
- Mode: Single-player

The Elder Scrolls IV: Shivering Isles is the second expansion pack for the role-playing video game The Elder Scrolls IV: Oblivion. Announced on January 18, 2007, the expansion was developed, published, and released over the Xbox Live Marketplace by Bethesda Softworks; its retail release was co-published with 2K Games. It was released for Microsoft Windows in a boxed retail edition on March 26, 2007, while the Xbox 360 version was released digitally on the Xbox Live Marketplace.

Shivering Isles takes place on the eponymous isles ruled by the Daedric Prince of Madness, Sheogorath. The player becomes Sheogorath's protégé, and together they try to defeat the Daedric Lord of Order, Jyggalag, thus preventing the isles from being destroyed; this main quest can be ignored for as long as the player wishes to interact with the new world. It is often considered to be Bethesda's best expansion, as well as one of the best expansions in video game history.

== Gameplay ==
Shivering Isles is identical to the basic gameplay of The Elder Scrolls IV: Oblivion; the basic design, maneuvers, and interfaces remain unchanged. As such, it is a fantasy-based role-playing adventure game. Players begin Oblivion by defining their character, deciding on its skill set, specialization, physical features, and race. The player gains experience points through the practice of specific skills, such as gaining archery experience by practicing archery. This goes against standard role-playing game form, where any skill use garners generic experience points that may be put towards any type of specialization. Enemies increase in difficulty as players strengthen their skills, scaling the game's challenge to the players' strength.

As with the original game, The Shivering Isles is an open-ended expansion. The main quest may be delayed or completely ignored as the player explores the game world, follows side quests, interacts with non-player characters, and develops a character according to their taste. Once the game is updated the player can access the extra content at any time with any character.

== Plot ==
The expansion pack takes place on the Shivering Isles, ruled by the Daedric Prince of Madness, Sheogorath. The realm is divided into two sections, Mania and Dementia, both of which have different characteristics in the art and design. The player enters the realm as an event called the Greymarch is about to occur - in which the Daedric Prince of Order, Jyggalag, completely destroys the Shivering Isles. Upon entering the realm, the player has access to only one area of the Shivering Isles, called the Fringe. To gain access to the other areas, the player must defeat a creature called the Gatekeeper. Before entering the other areas, the player is summoned for an audience with the mad god Sheogorath. Sheogorath explains to the player that the Greymarch will destroy the realm, and Sheogorath needs a "champion" to stop the event from occurring. Sheogorath decides to choose the player as his protégé, whom he sends off on various quests in an attempt to stop the Greymarch.

Sheogorath's and the player's attempts to stop the Greymarch ultimately fail. Sheogorath then transforms into Jyggalag, by then revealed to be his alter-ego, and disappears. As the player defends the Court of Madness from the ensuing invasion of the forces of Order, Jyggalag himself appears and attacks the player. The player defeats Jyggalag, and the Greymarch stops. Jyggalag then explains to the player that, when the Daedric Princes were creating their own lands, his power and the rapid expansion of his realm caused the other princes to become fearful and jealous, prompting them to curse him with madness, changing him into Sheogorath, the Prince of Madness. Since Daedra are subject to a reincarnation cycle, Jyggalag/Sheogorath was doomed to relive the Greymarch at the end of each era, after which Jyggalag would once again be transformed into Sheogorath. After explaining this history, Jyggalag thanks the player for breaking the cycle and dubs him/her the "new" Sheogorath, Prince of Madness and ruler of the Shivering Isles.

== Development ==
The earliest news about Shivering Isles surfaced on January 4, 2007, when an issue of PC Zone revealed the expansion. The issue revealed details about the plot and setting of the expansion, published its first screenshots and announced its expected arrival in the second quarter of 2007. Bethesda did not announce the expansion until January 18, 2007. The announcement came after the expansion had already been featured in both PC Zone and PC Gamer, after it had been scheduled for a February 6, 2007 appearance in Games for Windows, and after it had been reported in several online publications. The official announcement also confirmed an eventual release for the Xbox 360, something the magazines, being PC publications, had not previously mentioned.

Further clarification came in early March when Executive Producer Todd Howard revealed the specific release date of March 27, 2007, but due to unscheduled maintenance, it was released on Xbox Live a day early. A disc version of Shivering Isles was announced on September 6, 2007, with a previously disallowed hard drive requirement. The expansion was released as a standalone for the PlayStation 3 version of the game on November 20, 2007, and as a download from the PlayStation Network on November 29, 2007. The expansion was made available for download to Australian customers only on November 23, 2007. Shivering Isles and Knights of the Nine expansions shipped together in the packaged release of Oblivion's Game of the Year edition.

=== Concept art ===
Much of the distinctive look of Shivering Isles is credited to concept artist Adam Adamowicz. The landscape of the Isles is divided into two main areas: Mania and Dementia. The land of Mania is characterized by vivid colour and fantastical flora, while Dementia is filled with bogs and agonistically twisted trees and roots. Adamowicz had a major influence on the style of other Bethesda Softworks game titles such as Fallout 3 and The Elder Scrolls V: Skyrim. The portal to the Shivering Isles was also designed by Adamowicz, and bears his signature style.

== Reception and legacy ==
The Elder Scrolls IV: Shivering Isles

Aggregate scores
Aggregator	Score
GameRankings	^{PC} 86.32% (based on 36 reviews)^{360} 87.62% (based on 45 reviews)
Metacritic	^{PC} 86 of 100 (based on 34 reviews)^{360} 86 of 100 (based on 42 reviews)

Review scores
Publication	Score
Eurogamer	7 of 10
GamePro	4.5 of 5
GameSpot	8.6 of 10
IGN	8.5 of 10
PC Gamer (UK)	75 / 100

Awards
Publication	Award
Game Industry News (2008)	RPG of the year
Voodoo Extreme (2007), Primotech (2007)	Expansion of the year
G-Phoria (2007)	Best Downloadable Content
TeamXbox, Game Pro, and IGN	Editor's Choice
Game Vortex	Top Pick
Advanced Media Network	Silver Award

The Shivering Isles was generally well received in the gaming press. Aggregate sites Metacritic and GameRankings scored both the PC version and the Xbox 360 version of the game at 86 out of 100.

Greg Mueller from GameSpot recommends the game for its value but sees it as "not an absolutely essential expansion" and rates some of the later quests as repetitive and uninspired. Similar comments followed from GamePro reviewer Newton, who found that it is "an impressive expansion" which "delivers more of what made Oblivion great: creative quests, a huge land to explore, and tons of things to do there, [therefore] making this expansion is a solid purchase for anyone who was a fan of the core game". Jim Rossignol from Eurogamer initially rated the game as equally memorable to Oblivion but later saying that it is "the same game as it ever was, only this time with a slightly weirder backdrop, and less interesting questing". Charles Onyett from IGN rates it as "an entirely worthy addition to Bethesda's stellar fourth entry in The Elder Scrolls series" and as "a great excuse to jump back in [the series]".

The expansion received accolades from several media publishers, including "Best RPG" at the 2008 Game of the Year Awards offered by Game Industry News, the "Best Expansion" at the 2007 Game of the Year Awards offered by Voodoo Extreme, as well as those offered by Primotech, and "Best Downloadable Content" at the G-Phoria 2007 Awards. It also received the "Editor's Choice Award" from TeamXbox, Game Pro, and IGN, as well as the "Top Pick Award" by Game Vortex, and the "Silver Award" from Advanced Media Network.

The expansion was included in the 2025 The Elder Scrolls IV: Oblivion Remastered.
