= Arrow in the knee =

Quote from The Elder Scrolls V: Skyrim

"I used to be an adventurer like you. Then I took an arrow in the knee...", or simply "arrow in the knee", is a quotation and Internet meme that originated from The Elder Scrolls V: Skyrim, an action role-playing video game developed by Bethesda Game Studios and published by Bethesda Softworks. Originally a procedurally generated line of dialogue conceived by Senior Bethesda game designer Emil Pagliarulo and spoken by voice actor Paul Ganus, it is said by the Whiterun guard, a non-player character (NPC); the phrase became unexpectedly popular among Skyrim players. The phrase and its variations, such as "arrow to the knee", have since found popular reference outside of the game's original context, as well as media unrelated to The Elder Scrolls franchise.

== Origin ==
The leadership of Bethesda Game Studios decided late in the development of The Elder Scrolls V: Skyrim that they wanted NPCs that play the role of guards to project more substantial personalities, as NPCs playing similar roles in many video games would simply grunt at player characters or convey instructions about what they are supposed to do. As part of the game's main quest, players are likely to visit the city of Whiterun early in their playthrough due to its proximity with the game's starting point, where they are likely to interact with the local guards that patrol the area. According to chief game developer Todd Howard, Emil Pagliarulo was asked to write dialogue that would have the guards reflect their observations back to the player character, and to reinforce their importance as the Last Dragonborn or Dovahkiin within the in-game world of Skyrim. Howard assigned Pagliarulo for the task because of his aptitude with writing memorable one-liners.

As part of Pagliarulo's creative process, he wrote idle lines of dialogue where the NPC guards would compliment the player character, comment on the player's current activities, or reminisce about their own lives. For one of these lines, the guard would tell the player character, "I used to be an adventurer like you, then I took an arrow in the knee." It was an attempt by Pagliarulo to give the guards "flavor and personality", and the idea of a "worn out fantasy beat cop" who is semi-retired felt like a "funny opportunity" for Pagliarulo that is somewhat believable.

According to Skyrim's audio director Mark Lampert, the guard NPCs' dialogue is procedurally generated, though it also undergoes adjustments in response to the player's activities. Due to its random nature, the line was originally intended by the developers to be heard by the player once in a while, if they ever hear it at all. As a majority of players are likely to have visited at least one specific dungeon area prior to their arrival in Whiterun, their characters would have an "adventure flag" on their character that is active once they have cleared out a dungeon area and acquired valuable treasure from within. Whiterun guard NPCs that pass by the flagged player characters are programmed to respond by acknowledging the player's status as an adventurer, though they are also likely to repeat the same phrase during a further encounter with the player due to the unpredictable nature of their artificial intelligence.

== Spread ==
The phrase became unexpectedly popular following the worldwide launch of Skyrim in November 11, 2011. It was frequently quoted on numerous message board forums and blogs across the Internet, either as a catchphrase or a snowclone in the form of "I used to X, but then I took an arrow in the knee", by players who were amused with the guard NPC's line of dialogue and voice acting. Some fans humorously noted that guards would utter the line before complaining about being assigned guard duty as opposed to fighting dragons, despite their previous statement indicating that they were not fit for the front lines. Numerous image macros and video parodies of the phrase, sometimes in modified form, were created and shared as part of a viral phenomenon. By February 2012, Stephen Totilo from Kotaku described the phrase as the "big video game joke of 2011", and the most repeated line from Skyrim.

The phrase's notoriety as a meme spawned numerous fan-made works like T-shirts, tattoos, and an unlicensed fangame. It has also been referenced in the Skyrim mod Enderal, and professionally produced media works which are independent of The Elder Scrolls franchise and the owners of its intellectual property (IP). It became a visual gag in the music video for musical duo LMFAO's 2012 single "Sorry for Party Rocking". It is conveyed as a joke in "Playing with Fire", the 22nd episode of the ninth season of the American police procedural drama NCIS, which aired in May 2012. Video games like the 2013 title Crysis 3 reference the meme with one of its in-game achievements.

The phrase has been misattributed as slang for marriage in Old Norse.

== Reaction ==
An Internet urban legend circulated through websites such as Know Your Meme alleged that the phrase was inspired by Patrick Rothfuss's book The Name of the Wind, a claim which Pagliarulo denied. By July 2012, Bethesda offered the sale of a skin for Xbox Avatars, which features a character model that has one of its knees impaled with an arrow, as an acknowledgement to the meme's popularity. In a retrospective feature article published by GamesRadar about the meme's origins, Lampert noted that video games developed and published by Bethesda often have a selection of memes that would become unintentionally popular with players due to the sheer size of the aforementioned games and the possibilities of emergent gameplay enabled by the conditions of their in-game worlds. In Lampert's view, the meme's breakout popularity was a "perfect storm" of the guard’s accent and wistful demeanor, as well as the apparent prevalence of the line within the opening minutes of Skyrim playthroughs as showcased in popular "Let's Play" videos uploaded to the Internet shortly after the game's launch in November 2011. The phrase's enduring popularity is noted by commentators a decade after the initial release of Skyrim.

Not all reactions to the meme have been affirmative, with some quarters expressing an annoyance at the meme's prevalence and popularity. Jon Partridge from Red Bull considered the full phrase to be one of the worst video game lines of all time, and that it is indicative of the game's "ridiculous script".
