= The Elder Scrolls IV: Oblivion Remastered =

2025 video game

- Developers: Virtuos; Bethesda Game Studios
- Publisher: Bethesda Softworks
- Directors: Theo Gallego; Tom Mustaine
- Producers: Veronique Bruneau; John Faulkenbury; Ricardo Mora; Alexander Murphy
- Designers: Benjamin Lorion; Elliot Ribeiro
- Programmers: John Dean; Dominique Faure; Alexandre Lautie
- Artists: Yago Pérez Diaz; Daniel T. Lee
- Series: The Elder Scrolls
- Engine: Unreal Engine 5 (graphics); Gamebryo (gameplay)
- Platforms: PlayStation 5; Windows; Xbox Series X/S; Nintendo Switch 2
- Release: April 22, 2025: PlayStation 5, Windows, Xbox Series X/S; April 22, 2025; Nintendo Switch 2; August 11, 2026
- Genre: Action role-playing
- Mode: Single-player

The Elder Scrolls IV: Oblivion Remastered is a 2025 action role-playing game co-developed by Virtuos and Bethesda Game Studios and published by Bethesda Softworks. It is a remaster of 2006's The Elder Scrolls IV: Oblivion and includes a full graphics overhaul using Unreal Engine 5 and various other improvements, from sprinting to redesigned menus. Oblivion Remastered includes all of the original game's downloadable content, including the expansion packs Knights of the Nine and Shivering Isles. The game was announced and released digitally for PlayStation 5, Windows, and Xbox Series X/S on April 22, 2025, to generally positive reviews from critics. It was released physically for PlayStation 5 and Xbox Series X/S on October 13. A Nintendo Switch 2 version was released on August 11, 2026.

== Gameplay ==
The Elder Scrolls IV: Oblivion Remastered retains the open world structure and core gameplay mechanics of the original, including real-time combat, character leveling, skill-based progression, and questlines tied to multiple factions. The remaster includes a full graphical overhaul with modern rendering techniques, ray tracing, and updated textures and models. Non-playable character behavior has been revised using improved AI, and all animations have been updated. The user interface and control schemes have also been redesigned for compatibility with current-generation hardware. Audio enhancements include re-recorded ambient sounds, environmental effects, and limited redone voice work. Knights of the Nine and Shivering Isles, which are paid expansion packs of the original game, are included in the remaster.

== Plot ==
The Elder Scrolls IV: Oblivion Remastered is set in the province of Cyrodiil, and the player takes the role of the Hero of Kvatch, who is drawn into a conflict involving the Daedric realm of Oblivion after the assassination of Emperor Uriel Septim VII.

== Development and release ==
The Elder Scrolls IV: Oblivion Remastered was co-developed by Virtuos' Paris studio and Bethesda Game Studios. Both studios began development of the remaster in 2021. The developers used Unreal Engine 5 to enhance the visuals, while relying on the Gamebryo engine for the core to enhance elements like physics and combat. Initial indications of the remaster emerged in September 2023, when internal Microsoft documents (dated 2020) disclosed during the Federal Trade Commission v. Microsoft case referenced, among other unannounced titles, an "Oblivion Remaster" slated for release in the 2022 fiscal year.

Further speculation arose in April 2025 following the discovery of in-game images and promotional materials on Virtuos' website, which were subsequently shared online. The images, found through an accessible WordPress file repository, showed recognizable themes such as the player's first view of the outside world upon leaving the tutorial quest, the Imperial City and its surroundings, and several other highlights. On April 21, 2025, Bethesda confirmed the remaster's existence by announcing a livestream scheduled for the following day, when the game was released for Windows through Steam, PlayStation 5, and Xbox Series X/S, in addition to day-one availability on the Xbox Game Pass. The live announcement on YouTube was watched by more than 600,000 people. On July 14, The Game Collection (an online video game retailer) announced that physical editions for PlayStation 5 and Xbox Series X would release on October 13. The remaster is set to release on Nintendo Switch 2 on August 11, 2026. The physical Switch 2 version of the title contains the entire game on a cartridge, contrary to Bethesda's comments - which stated that the game would contain a download code only in the box as with the Switch 2 physical releases for the Anniversary Editions of Fallout 4 and The Elder Scrolls V: Skyrim.

On April 22, 2025, Bethesda stated that the remaster will not officially support modding. This was seen as unusual by various news outlets due to the company being generally supportive of the practice, adding extensive mod support to most of their titles, including their previous major release Starfield. Despite the lack of official mod support, user-created mods began emerging rapidly after the game's release.

== Reception ==
Reception

Aggregate scores
Aggregator	Score
Metacritic	(PC) 80/100 (PS5) 82/100 (XSXS) 82/100
OpenCritic	87% recommend

Review scores
Publication	Score
GameSpot	8/10
Hardcore Gamer	4.5/5
IGN	8/10
PC Gamer (US)	84/100
Push Square	7/10
RPGFan	90/100
Video Games Chronicle	4/5
VG247	3/5

The Elder Scrolls IV: Oblivion Remastered received "generally favorable" reviews from critics, according to review aggregator website Metacritic. OpenCritic determined that 87% of critics recommended the game. The game won "Best Remake / Remaster" at the 2025 Golden Joystick Awards.

GameSpot's Jake Dekker praised the visuals as establishing "a new standard for Bethesda RPGs", and also highlighted the character models and the handling of original game elements. Dekker additionally commended the revamped leveling system, although he found the combat "still rough".

The game was criticized for performance issues. Digital Foundry's Alex Battaglia found Oblivion Remastered to be "one of the worst-performing PC games I've ever tested", even when played on a high-end PC. Similar technical issues were raised by the game's player base, with official patches from Bethesda failing to alleviate the problems.

=== Surprise release reaction ===
The Elder Scrolls IV: Oblivion Remastered was released without any prior announcement, being available the same day as the start of the livestream. Certain indie developers and publishers criticised this decision, stating that the surprise release affected their games' sales. Jonas Antonsson, co-founder of Raw Fury, expressed his love for Oblivion and the fact that new players can experience the game, while also stating that surprise releases of this size cause smaller games to get "buried". Developer Mike Rose advertised his game Starless Abyss on Twitter, claiming that the release of Oblivion Remastered the same week has not been "fantastic for [the game's] launch." The official Twitter account of Kepler Interactive—the publisher behind Clair Obscur: Expedition 33, released the same day as Oblivion Remastered—posted a tweet, comparing the simultaneous release of the two games to the Barbenheimer phenomenon, while GamesRadar+ compared the launch to the concurrent release of Animal Crossing: New Horizons and Doom Eternal. Bethesda's official Twitter account later responded to Kelper Interactive's tweet with an image of celebrating NPCs from Oblivion in front of a television with Expedition 33, captioned "We can't wait to play!"

=== Sales ===
The Elder Scrolls IV: Oblivion Remastered reached 4 million players three days after release, with a peak of 216,000 concurrent players on Steam. In the first week of May 2025, the game had become the 3rd best-selling game of the year in the United States by dollar sales, while excluding downloads from Xbox Game Pass. It was the best-selling game in the US in April 2025; the game sold more copies in its launch week than the original Oblivion did in its first 15 months in the country. It reached 9 million players three months after release.

== See also ==
- Skyblivion – Upcoming fan remake
