= High Rock (Antarctica) =

Nunatak in Queen Mary Land, Antarctica

- Location within Antarctica

Highest point
- Coordinates: 66°24′00″S 98°38′00″E

Geography
- Country: Australian Antarctic Territory
- Region: Queen Mary Land

High Rock is a nunatak located on David Island, off the coast of Queen Mary Land in eastern Antarctica. It rises 2.3 km northwest of The Doublets.

High Rock was discovered and named by the Western Base party of the Australasian Antarctic Expedition of 1911–1914 under Douglas Mawson.
