= High Rock Mountain (New Jersey) =

Mountain in Warren County, New Jersey, United States

Highest point
- Elevation: 889 ft (271 m) NGVD 29
- Coordinates: 40°50′46″N 74°58′41″W

Geography
- Location: Warren County, New Jersey, U.S.
- Topo map: USGS Washington

Climbing
- Easiest route: Hiking

High Rock Mountain is a mountain in Warren County, New Jersey. The summit rises to 889 feet (271 m), and is located on the boundary of Liberty and White Townships. It is part of the New York–New Jersey Highlands of the Appalachian Mountains, although somewhat isolated to the west of the main body of the Highlands.

High Rock Mountain is not to be confused with High Rocks, a feature of the Kittatinny Valley.
