= High Rock Lake (Nevada) =

- Location within Nevada
- Location: Humboldt County, Nevada
- Coordinates: 41°17′20″N 119°16′57″W
- Type: lake

High Rock Lake is a lake in the U.S. state of Nevada.

High Rock Lake was so named on account of a tall rock formation at its shore.
