= The Elder Scrolls V: Skyrim – Dragonborn =

Video game add-on

- Developer: Bethesda Game Studios
- Publisher: Bethesda Softworks
- Composer: Jeremy Soule
- Series: The Elder Scrolls
- Engine: Creation Engine
- Platforms: Xbox 360; Microsoft Windows; PlayStation 3; PlayStation 4; Xbox One; Nintendo Switch; PlayStation 5; Xbox Series X/S
- Release: December 4, 2012: Xbox 360; WW: December 4, 2012 Microsoft Windows; WW: February 5, 2013 PlayStation 3; NA: February 12, 2013; EU: February 13, 2013 PS4, Xbox One; WW: October 28, 2016 Nintendo Switch; WW: November 17, 2017 PS5, Xbox Series X/S; WW: November 11, 2021
- Genre: Action role-playing
- Mode: Single-player

The Elder Scrolls V: Skyrim – Dragonborn is the third and final add-on for the action role-playing open world video game The Elder Scrolls V: Skyrim. It was developed by Bethesda Game Studios and released by Bethesda Softworks on the Xbox Live Marketplace on December 4, 2012. The Microsoft Windows version was released on February 5, 2013, and the PlayStation 3 version was released on February 12, 2013.

Dragonborn involves the player character (the current Dragonborn) coming into contact with the first Dragonborn, Miraak. The expansion takes place on the island of Solstheim, previously featured in the Bloodmoon expansion for The Elder Scrolls III: Morrowind.

== Gameplay ==
A screenshot of a Netch, one of the creatures included in Dragonborn, previously featured in The Elder Scrolls III: Morrowind. Morrowind's smoking Red Mountain can be seen in the background.

Dragonborn follows the same gameplay style as Skyrim, with the player free to explore the island of Solstheim at will, pursuing quests at their leisure. New armors, weapons, locations, and enemies have been introduced. A new feature in Dragonborn is the ability to tame and ride dragons. The player can use a dragon to target and attack enemies, but does not have complete control of the flight. New dragon shouts have also been introduced.

== Setting ==
The expansion is set on the island of Solstheim, located off the north coast of Morrowind. Solstheim was a territory that once belonged to Skyrim until the High King gave the island to Morrowind to serve as a refuge for the Dunmer fleeing Morrowind after the eruption of the Red Mountain volcano. Geographically, half of Solstheim is similar to northern Skyrim, covered in icy glaciers and snow. The other half is barren, and covered in ash following the Red Mountain disaster. The island's settlements and buildings also reflect the differing cultures, with the Nordic half of the land featuring architecture similar to Skyrim's. The rest of the island follows a Dunmeri (Dark Elves) architectural style, even containing a giant mushroom transformed into a house. The island's main settlement, Raven Rock, is governed by House Redoran, one of five Great Houses who rule over Morrowind, and protected by their personal hold guards, the Redoran Guard.

== Plot ==
Dragonborn's main quest line is initiated following an attack on the player, the Last Dragonborn, by cultists worshipping someone named Miraak, who is also referred to as First Dragonborn. The player defeats the cultists and, upon investigating them, discovers a set of orders revealing their origins: the island of Solstheim. The player then journeys to Solstheim to confront Miraak and his followers by chartering a ship, the Northern Maiden, out of Windhelm to take them to Raven Rock.

After arriving on the island, the player begins interrogating the citizens of Solstheim about Miraak. It immediately becomes apparent that a majority of Solstheim's population has been unconsciously enslaved by Miraak and forced to work on several runic monoliths called "All-Maker Stones", scattered across the island. Among the unaffected observers is a Telvanni wizard, Neloth, who directs the player to the Temple of Miraak. The player reaches the Temple and encounters a Nord named Frea, who is immune to Miraak's control, attempting in vain to break his spell over her people, the Skaal. She accompanies the player into the Temple. Inside, the player discovers a "Black Book", and after reading it, is unwittingly transported into a realm of Oblivion called Apocrypha, where they witness Miraak planning his invasion of Tamriel. Miraak discovers their presence, incapacitates them, and dismisses the player as inferior before having a pair of Seekers, guardians of Apocrypha, return them to Solstheim.

Upon their return, the player visits Skaal Village and, advised by the Skaal shaman Storn, performs a special dragon shout on an All-Maker Stone, purifying the monolith and freeing the Skaal and the other denizens of the island from Miraak's control, while also having to contend with Lurkers, the other guardians of Apocrypha, sent by Miraak to reclaim the All-Maker Stones. Storn then sends the player to Neloth, who reveals that the Black Books are relics belonging to Hermaeus Mora, the Daedric Prince of Fate, Knowledge, and Memory, who is otherwise known as the "keeper of forbidden knowledge", and the source of Miraak's power.

Neloth accompanies the player to the Dwemer ruin of Nchardak to retrieve another Black Book sealed inside a complex container. They release the mechanism and learn of a shout called "Bend Will", which is believed to be instrumental in defeating Miraak. Through the Black Books, the player journeys into Apocrypha again, and personally encounters Hermaeus Mora. Mora explains that if the player wishes to defeat Miraak, he must gain the same knowledge that Miraak possesses. He agrees to impart such knowledge in exchange for the secrets of the Skaal, one of the few remaining pieces of knowledge kept from the Daedric prince to place in his vast library in Apocrypha. After encountering and killing the dragon Krosulhah outside Nchardak, sent by Miraak to eliminate the player, they return to Skaal Village and persuade Storn to surrender the tribe's secrets. If the Water, Earth, Wind, and Beast stones have been freed from Miraak’s control, Storn will agree. Despite Frea's protests, Storn communicates directly with Mora, who then proceeds to sap him of his knowledge, killing him in the process in front of the entire village. The player then learns the final word of "Bend Will", enabling them to defeat Miraak.

The player returns to Apocrypha and uses "Bend Will" to subdue Miraak's dragon, Sahrotaar, allowing them to mount him in flight. Sahrotaar flies the player to Miraak's tower, the Summit of Apocrypha. There, the player and Miraak battle, with Miraak sacrificing Sahrotaar and his other two dragons, Relonikiv and Kruziikrel, to replenish his strength until Hermaeus Mora intervenes, fatally impaling Miraak while expressing anger at his rebellion and betrayal of Mora's trust with the knowledge he was granted by the Daedric Prince. Mora transfers Miraak's soul and power to the player, who is then transported back to Solstheim. The Summit of Apocrypha becomes a place where the player can exchange dragon souls for recovering perk points to place on other skills, customizing their skills to their liking for other quests both in Solstheim and back in Skyrim.

== Soundtrack ==
The soundtrack associated with Dragonborn includes music previously used in The Elder Scrolls III: Morrowind, as well as several new tracks composed by Jeremy Soule, who composed the soundtrack for several other games in The Elder Scrolls series.

== Release ==
Dragonborn was originally announced via a trailer on November 5, 2012. Dragonborn was released on the Xbox Live Marketplace on December 4, 2012. The Microsoft Windows version was released on February 5, 2013. The PlayStation 3 version was released on February 12, 2013 in North America, and February 13, 2013 in Europe.

== Reception ==
Reception

Aggregate score
Aggregator	Score
Metacritic	X360: 82/100; PC: 83/100; PS3: 82/100

Review scores
Publication	Score
Destructoid	8.5/10
Eurogamer	9/10
Game Informer	8.5/10
GameTrailers	8.5/10
IGN	8.8/10
PC Gamer (US)	88%

Dragonborn has received mainly positive critical reception. GamesRadar applauded the number of side quests, and the new weapons and dragon shouts, but dismissed the dragon riding feature as "gimmicky". Eurogamer gave the content 9 out of 10, praising the quests, new enemies and new location. Joystiq applauded the amount of content in Dragonborn, including the new settings and enemies, but felt that the narrative was too familiar.
