= The Elder Scrolls: Legends =

2017 free-to-play digital collectible card video game

- Developers: Dire Wolf Digital (2017–2018); Sparkypants Studios (2018–2025)
- Publisher: Bethesda Softworks
- Director: Iain McCaig
- Producer: Andrew Sullivan
- Designer: Brady Dommermuth
- Artists: Mishi McCaig; Iain McCaig
- Writer: Wynne McLaughlin
- Composer: Bradley Derrick
- Series: The Elder Scrolls
- Engine: Unity
- Platforms: Microsoft Windows, iOS, macOS, Android
- Release: Microsoft Windows: WW: March 9, 2017; macOS: WW: May 31, 2017; iOS, Android: WW: July 27, 2017
- Genre: Collectible card
- Mode: Multiplayer

The Elder Scrolls: Legends was a free-to-play digital collectible card video game, published by Bethesda Softworks for Microsoft Windows, iOS, macOS and Android in 2017.

Bethesda announced in December 2019 that development on Legends had been halted. The game's servers remained online until January 30, 2025.

== Gameplay ==
The Elder Scrolls: Legends was a collectible card game which revolves around turn-based matches between two opponents (player vs. player, or player vs. a computer opponent). The cards are based on creatures, characters and lore found in The Elder Scrolls series.

Each player or computer opponent starts with a deck between 50 and 100 cards (previously 50 to 70). At the start of every battle, each player starts off with three cards drawn from that deck and one magicka, which is used to deploy cards. To offset the advantage of taking the first turn, the second player also starts with a jeweled ring in play that can be activated once per turn to gain one additional magicka three times during the game. Each player gets one additional magicka at the start of their turns thereafter. Without use of specialized cards, a player's magicka can only reach 12 in a game. The player and their opponent are represented by a character with a set amount of health, with the goal to reduce the competitor's health to zero.

Each player can use their available magicka to play any number of cards. Cards are divided into four types: Support cards, which provide ongoing benefits; Action Cards, which are effects that are instantaneously played; Creatures, which are the main method of conducting combat; and Items, which enhance creatures. Creatures normally cannot attack the turn they come into play. Creatures have attack and health values; when creatures attack, they deal the damage equal to their attack value to the opponent creature or opponent character, and take damage equivalent to the defending creature's attack. If a creature's health drops to zero, that creature is defeated and removed from play. Many cards feature additional effects, listed explicitly or by a number of pre-defined keywords.

The Elder Scrolls: Legends features lanes which creatures are played into, limiting their attacks to the opposing creatures in that lane.

When deploying Creatures, the player can place them on one of two sides, called lanes; creatures can only attack opponent creatures in that lane or the opponent character directly. Lanes can have special abilities which alter the fields of battle. In standard play, one lane is a "Shadow Lane" where all creatures played into it cannot be targeted by creature attacks for one turn. Other fields of play have other types of lanes, and some cards have the ability to affect lane placement.

In addition to their health points, a player has a number of runes, one for every 5 points of health that could be lost without dying (e.g. for a typical match with 30 health, the player will have 5 runes). When a player loses health and losing one of the runes, they immediately draw one card. Some cards in the game feature the "Prophecy" keyword, which allows these cards to be played immediately if they are the result of a rune-card draw.

As the player wins matches and completes other tasks in the game, they will level up their character and gain new cards. The distribution of new cards is influenced by the character race that the player selects at the start of the game. Some cards in a player's collection can be leveled up as the player's level increases. Leveling up a card may offer the player the choice of two alternate versions. Players can also obtain new cards by spending in-game gold (given as rewards for some activities or completing daily quests) or real-world money.

The Elder Scrolls: Legends supports five play modes, four of which are always available. Battle mode lets players play with their decks against other players, either in a ranked system through random matchmaking or in casual mode with friends, or may allow players to test decks against computer opponents in practice rounds. Arena mode allows players to draft a deck of cards from a random selection of cards; this deck can then be used to go up against a series of computer opponents or in a number of matches against human ones. A deck is retired if it wins 9 matches against the computer or 7 against other players, or loses 3 matches, with the player getting rewards for how successful their deck was. A campaign-based Story mode features a number of preset opponents that the player must face. Puzzle sets, where the player must defeat or survive against an AI controlled opponent for one turn in a specific scenario. Finally, the game features periodic Gauntlet events that run for a short period of time and allow to play a constructed deck to 9 wins or 3 losses against other players, with rewards based on success.

== Plot ==
The story revolves around the player character and some allies against a High Elf named Naarifin who has invaded the heart of the Empire, Cyrodiil. The player character, called 'The Forgotten Hero', has to fight various hazards along the way to reaching the White-Gold Tower, where Naarifin plans to release demon-like creatures called Daedra in an attempt to fulfill an Elder Scroll prophecy called the Culling. Along the way, the player makes various choices determining how the story unfolds and cards they gain as rewards.

== Development and release ==
The Elder Scrolls: Legends was initially developed by Dire Wolf Digital. The game was revealed at Bethesda's 2015 Electronic Entertainment Expo conference. In April 2016, a closed beta for Windows was released. In August 2016, an open beta for Windows was released. The game was originally scheduled for release in 2016 as a free-to-play title for Android, iOS, macOS, and Windows. The Windows version officially launched on March 9, 2017. An iOS for iPad devices launched on March 23, 2017. Mobile versions for iOS and Android smartphones was released in July 2017. MacOS and Android tablet-only versions have been released. During the Electronic Entertainment Expo 2018, Bethesda also announced that the game is planned for release on PlayStation 4, Nintendo Switch, and Xbox One.

In May 2018, Bethesda announced that Dire Wolf had been transitioned off the project, with the game now being developed by Sparkypants Studios. According to Pete Hines, the decision to change developers was amicable for all parties, and in no way reflected on Dire Wolf Studios' work to date or their current work on a different digital card game. The core concepts of the game are not expected to change with this, but are expected to provide an improved user interface, and better response to adjust gameplay balance and bugs. The first public version of this new client was released in September 2018, which was met with complaints from users of the original client, claiming that the new interface lacked the charm of the original, while adding more clutter to the screen. Bethesda said they would continue to work with Sparkypants and fans to improve the client in the future in response to these complaints.

In December 2019, Bethesda announced that they had halted development on Legends "for the foreseeable future", which includes development of the client and expansion sets for the game. They will continue to offer the game for download, maintain servers, and continue to engage the community with events and special promotions.

The game launched in Asia in March 2020 on iOS and Android. But the Asian server was shut down soon after, on December 31, 2020.

On November 1, 2024, Bethesda announced that the servers for the game would shut down. Legends was delisted from Steam the following day and shut down on January 30, 2025.

== Expansion sets ==
While the main game is free-to-play, expansion sets featuring different themes are available for purchase.

Expansion title	Expansion content	Release date
The Fall of the Dark Brotherhood	It has a new story expansion divided into three "maps" and contains a set of 40 cards.	April 5, 2017
Heroes of Skyrim	The expansion includes over 150 new cards, featuring elements from The Elder Scrolls V: Skyrim.	June 29, 2017
Return to Clockwork City	It has a new story expansion and card pack and contains a set of 55 cards.	November 30, 2017
Houses of Morrowind	The expansion includes 149 new cards.	April 6, 2018
Isle of Madness	It has a new story expansion and contains a set of 55 cards.	January 24, 2019
Alliance War	It contains a set of more than 100 cards.	April 15, 2019
Moons of Elsweyr	It contains a set of more than 75 cards.	June 27, 2019
Jaws of Oblivion	It contains a set of more than 75 cards.	October 8, 2019

== Reception ==
Reception

Aggregate score
Aggregator	Score
Metacritic	PC: 80/100 iOS: 83/100

Review scores
Publication	Score
Game Informer	8.25/10
IGN	8.3/10
PC Gamer (US)	78/100
TouchArcade	5/5

The Elder Scrolls: Legends received "generally positive" reviews, according to review aggregator Metacritic.
