= The Elder Scrolls V: Skyrim – Hearthfire =

2012 Skyrim Expansion

- Developer: Bethesda Game Studios
- Publisher: Bethesda Softworks
- Series: The Elder Scrolls
- Engine: Creation Engine
- Platforms: Xbox 360; Microsoft Windows; PlayStation 3; PlayStation 4; Xbox One; Nintendo Switch; PlayStation 5; Xbox Series X/S
- Release: September 4, 2012: Xbox 360; WW: September 4, 2012 Microsoft Windows; WW: October 5, 2012 PlayStation 3; NA: February 19, 2013; EU: February 20, 2013 PS4, Xbox One; WW: October 28, 2016 Nintendo Switch; WW: November 17, 2017 PS5, Xbox Series X/S; WW: November 11, 2021
- Genre: Action role-playing
- Mode: Single-player

The Elder Scrolls V: Skyrim – Hearthfire is the second downloadable content add-on for the action role-playing open world video game The Elder Scrolls V: Skyrim. The game was developed by Bethesda Game Studios and published by Bethesda Softworks. The Xbox 360 version of Hearthfire launched on September 4, 2012. It was released on Microsoft Windows via Steam on October 5, 2012. It was released for the PlayStation 3 on February 19, 2013, in North America and February 20, 2013, in Europe.

Hearthfire revolves around acquiring and improving land, allowing the player to build and customize their own home. The add-on also introduced adoption, giving players the option of adopting up to two children to live with them in their personal home.

== Gameplay ==
A screenshot of Lakeview Manor during construction. The player must collect materials and resources to build it.

Hearthfire allows the player character to purchase a plot of land and build their own home from raw materials such as lumber and clay, with the option of adding features such as greenhouses, bee hives, and alchemy and enchanting facilities. There are three homesteads the player can build: Lakeview Manor (east of Falkreath), Windstad Manor (northeast of Morthal), and Heljarchen Hall (south of Dawnstar). Each one requires the player to have earned the respect of the Jarl in charge of the hold at the time and become Thane, then purchase the land from the Jarl or their steward. There are options to hire stewards to look after the home, carriage drivers for quick transportation, and a personal bard, along with animals, including horses for easier transport when overloaded with various items. Hearthfire also introduces the option to raise a family by adopting children. In addition, previously bought pre-built homes, such as Proudspire Manor in Solitude or Breezehome in Whiterun, can be altered to have a children's bedroom added into them.

== Release ==
Hearthfire was released on September 4, 2012, for Xbox 360, and October 4, 2012, on PC. Due to performance issues, the PlayStation 3 version of Hearthfire was delayed and later released on February 19, 2013.

== Reception ==
Reception

Aggregate score
Aggregator	Score
Metacritic	X360: 54/100; PS3: 69/100

Review scores
Publication	Score
Eurogamer	5/10
PlayStation Official Magazine – UK	7/10
Official Xbox Magazine (UK)	6/10
VideoGamer.com	4/10
Digital Spy	3/5
The Escapist	3/5

Hearthfire received a mixed reception, with Metacritic ranking the PlayStation 3 and Xbox 360 versions of the game with scores of 69 and 54, respectively. Eurogamer gave Hearthfire a score of 5/10, stating that it could have been "more creative" and "less restrictive" in its house building feature, and that the new child adoption seemed nothing more than "simply picking one of a handful of pre-rendered moppets who will go through a series of pre-rendered routines". However, the site went on to say that its content was worth the low price point, and was a "more interesting way of incorporating useful features into the world than simply having you unlock a pre-built house". PlayStation Official Magazine gave a positive review, calling the DLC "reasonably priced", stating, "Skyrim is a game you really make your own, and building a home in Hearthfire is a natural and enjoyable extension of this concept. It's not quite up there with the excitement of slaying beasts and looting dungeons, but homebodies will love it nonetheless." The Escapist gave the add-on 3 out of 5 stars, and felt that the new adoption feature was "kind of a waste of time" due to the absence of the child developing or growing older. In regards to the home building, the magazine criticized the lack of customization options and wrote, "you can't even choose which furniture goes into each room, just whether or not it's made." The magazine did note that Hearthfire provides an added convenience to the player for managing their items, along with the benefit of cutting down on traveling time to a forge or enchanter's table. VideoGamer.com panned the add-on, specifically its shortcomings in offering the player their personal touch. The site wrote that the "variety and customization" options of the homes were lacking, and as a result "never feels like it's truly yours".
