= High Rock (South Georgia) =

Mountain in Antarctica

- Location within South Georgia Island

Highest point
- Coordinates: 53°57′43″S 37°29′20″W

Geography
- Country: South Georgia and the South Sandwich Islands
- Region: South Georgia

High Rock is a 30 m high cliff rock off the north coast of South Georgia. It rises 7 km west-northwest of Cape Buller at the northern end of the Welcome Islands from the South Atlantic.

Scientists from the British Discovery Investigations discovered it in the course of surveying work between 1926 and 1930 and named it descriptively.
