= Game Pro =

Italian video game magazine

- Editor: Marco Accordi Rickards
- Categories: Games magazine
- Frequency: Monthly
- First issue: July 2007
- Company: Sprea Media Italy
- Country: Italy
- Based in: Rome
- Language: Italian

Game Pro is the Italian edition of Edge video game magazine, specializing in multi-format video games.

== History ==
Launched in 2007 by Future Media Italy, a division of Future Publishing, as Videogiochi (English: Videogames, already under Edge license), the magazine was acquired by the Italian publishing company Sprea Media Italy and renamed Game Pro.

== See also ==
- List of magazines in Italy
