= The Elder Scrolls V: Skyrim – Dawnguard =

Expansion for the video game The Elder Scrolls V: Skyrim

- Developer: Bethesda Game Studios
- Publisher: Bethesda Softworks
- Composer: Jeremy Soule
- Series: The Elder Scrolls
- Engine: Creation Engine
- Platforms: Xbox 360; Microsoft Windows; PlayStation 3; PlayStation 4; Xbox One; Nintendo Switch; PlayStation 5; Xbox Series X/S
- Release: June 26, 2012: Xbox 360; WW: June 26, 2012 Microsoft Windows; WW: August 2, 2012 PlayStation 3; NA: February 26, 2013; EU: February 27, 2013 PS4, Xbox One; WW: October 28, 2016 Nintendo Switch; WW: November 17, 2017 PS5, Xbox Series X/S; WW: November 11, 2021
- Genre: Action role-playing
- Mode: Single-player

The Elder Scrolls V: Skyrim – Dawnguard is a downloadable content add-on for the action role-playing open world video game The Elder Scrolls V: Skyrim. It was developed by Bethesda Game Studios and published by Bethesda Softworks. The Xbox 360 version of Dawnguard was launched in English-speaking territories on June 26, 2012, and in France, Germany, Italy, and Spain in mid-July 2012. It was released on Microsoft Windows via Steam on August 2, 2012. Due to performance issues, the PlayStation 3 release of Dawnguard was delayed until February 26, 2013.

Dawnguard revolves around an ancient prophecy predicted by an Elder Scroll. The Dawnguard is an organization dedicated to hunting vampires who attempt to stop the return of a powerful clan of Vampires named the Volkihar who possess the power to turn into monstrous "vampire lords". The Volkihar's leader Lord Harkon intends to use an Elder Scroll to permanently blot out the sun. The player can choose to either aid the Dawnguard or join the Volkihar, becoming a vampire lord themselves in the process. The DLC includes new armors, items, weapons, characters, etc.

== Gameplay ==
Two unique skill trees are introduced in Dawnguard, one for vampirism and one for lycanthropy. Players are given the choice to join forces with the vampiric Volkihar Clan or to fight them alongside an order of vampire hunters known as the Dawnguard. Players will be granted access to one of two home bases: Castle Volkihar or Fort Dawnguard. New armors, perks, and weapons are introduced, including a crossbow used by the Dawnguard. Crossbows remain loaded while moving in the world, allowing a quicker reaction than bows at the cost of being slower to reload and reducing the player's movement speed during reloading. Crossbows fall under the archery perk tree and all points assigned to archery will also apply to them. Crossbow bolts can be crafted with enchantments to create bolts with additional magical damage.

A temporary transformation into a "vampire lord" is available for vampires. It functions like the existing werewolf transformation, with the exception that it may be used repeatedly rather than being limited to once per day. The vampire lord has a new skill tree to level up. Werewolves have also been given a skill tree, which they did not have previously. The vampire lord skill tree contains eleven perks, and the werewolf skill tree contains eight perks. The vampire lord levels up through kills with its Drain Life spell or its bite attack, while the werewolf gains experience towards its skill tree by consuming corpses while transformed to extend the duration of the transformation.

New locations are featured in Dawnguard, including two explorable new world spaces: a realm of Oblivion called the Soul Cairn, and the Forgotten Vale, a secluded arctic valley located somewhere outside the holds of Haafingar and the Reach. Additionally, large areas serve as central quest hubs during the story, such as Castle Volkihar, located on a coastal island off the Haafingar coastline, and Fort Dawnguard, located in a small canyon outside the Rift. A "face sculptor" character is introduced in The Ragged Flagon in Riften, allowing players to change the facial appearance of their character at will. Stronger "legendary" dragons are also present in Dawnguard, appearing randomly throughout the environment, and can be slain by the player character and absorbed like any other dragon (awarding an achievement). Three new dragon shouts have also been added: Drain Vitality, Soul Tear, and Summon Durnehviir.

== Plot ==
The player character may begin the expansion quest lines in a number of ways. Town guards can be overheard discussing the return of the Dawnguard, or the player character may be approached directly by an Orcish Dawnguard member named Durak and asked to join the order to combat the growing threat of vampires within Skyrim. Regardless of how it is initiated, the player character travels to Fort Dawnguard, accessible through Dayspring Canyon, located near Riften. They meet with the Dawnguard commander, Isran, who reiterates the renewed strength and threat of the vampires, citing their destruction of the headquarters of the Vigilants of Stendarr in the Pale, the Hall of the Vigilants, and killing of Keeper Carcette, as reason to reform the Dawnguard and eradicate the vampires. The player character is given a crossbow and asked to travel to a ruin the vampires are known to be investigating in the Pale known as Dimhollow Crypt. Upon arrival, after dealing with the vampires already investigating the ruin, including their leader Lokil, the player discovers a vampire named Serana (voiced by Laura Bailey) trapped inside a statue. She is in possession of an Elder Scroll, and informs the player that her family live in a dwelling off the coast of Skyrim, near Solitude, called Castle Volkihar. She asks the player character to escort her safely back to her home. When she has been returned home, her father, the vampire Lord Harkon, leader of the powerful Clan Volkihar vampires, offers the player the chance to become a vampire lord out of apparent gratitude for his daughter's safety and join the clan, or the chance to leave Castle Volkihar safely and return to the Dawnguard. This choice begins the main storyline of Dawnguard.

=== Volkihar path ===
If the player accepts Lord Harkon's offer, the vampire lord bites the player character. The player awakens in a room, in front of a shrine to the Daedric Prince of Domination, Molag Bal. Harkon explains Molag Bal is considered the "father of [his] kind". Thousands of years ago, Harkon was a king and a mortal. He pledged his soul to Molag Bal, and sacrificed "a thousand innocents" in his name. The Daedra granted Harkon and his family immortality by afflicting them with vampirism. Harkon shows the player character how to utilize their new vampire lord form and powers. The player is then tasked with retrieving the Bloodstone Chalice, a powerful artifact intended to aid Harkon's cause, to fill it with water from Redwater Den, and then to add the blood of a powerful vampire. While retrieving the Chalice, the player character is attacked by two of the Volkihar, Stalf and Salonia, who are plotting to overthrow Harkon under orders from Vingalmo and Orthjolf, Harkon's top advisers. After killing them, the player adds their blood to the Chalice and returns to Castle Volkihar.

After receiving the Chalice, Harkon spreads false rumors around Skyrim regarding the alleged discovery of an Elder Scroll, to try and lure a Moth Priest to the land. The Moth Priests are an ancient order, capable of looking upon the Elder Scrolls and deciphering prophecy from them. The player travels to Forebear's Holdout just south of Dragon Bridge, and captures a Moth Priest named Dexion Evicus who had been enthralled by an Orcish vampire named Malkus before he was slain by the Dawnguard led by their commander Vanik. The player turns the Priest into a thrall, and upon reading the Scroll, Evicus reveals to the Volkihar that they need to locate a weapon named Auriel's Bow, as well as two more Elder Scrolls. One of the Scrolls lies within the Dwemer ruin of Blackreach, and is retrieved as part of the original main quest line alongside doing the Daedric quest for Molag Bal's fellow Daedric Prince, Hermaeus Mora. The other was taken by Serana's estranged mother, Valerica, when she fled the castle. The player character and Serana journey to a plane of Oblivion known as the Soul Cairn. They locate Valerica and retrieve the final Elder Scroll. Before they return to Tamriel, Valerica warns them to stop Harkon, as he intends to kill Serana to fulfill the prophecy. The player also earns the respect of the dragon Durnehviir, who had acted as Valerica's guardian in the Soul Cairn before being bested in combat by the player, and provides the player with the shout to summon him outside of the Soul Cairn for a while.

The player character learns from the Elder Scrolls that Auriel's Bow is located in Darkfall Cave. The player meets with Gelebor, one of the last remaining Snow Elves, and a Knight-Paladin of the Chantry of Auri-El. He instructs the player how to retrieve Auriel's Bow, by completing a series of tasks and defeating Arch-Curate Vyrthur, Gelebor's brother, who has been corrupted by the Falmer. The player character and Serana confront Vyrthur in the Chantry's Inner Sanctum and discover that he is both a vampire and the creator of the prophecy, and desires to block out of the sun in order to disrupt Auri-El's influence in Tamriel, in retaliation for the god allowing him to be afflicted with vampirism.

After retrieving the Bow, the player character and Serana confront Lord Harkon in Castle Volkihar. They battle Harkon and slay him, ending the threat to Tamriel and to Serana, and the members of Harkon's court acknowledge the player character as their new master and ruler of the castle.

=== Dawnguard path ===
If the player character refuses Harkon's offer and returns to the Dawnguard, the plot plays out nearly identically, albeit viewed from the perspective of the Dawnguard, with the player being assigned by Isran to recruit his old teammates Sorine Jurard and Gunmar to restore the Dawnguard's numbers. Once the Dawnguard are able to replenish their numbers and reform, including adding Florentius Baenius to the group, Serana makes herself known to the Dawnguard, relaying information about Harkon's plan, and pledging assistance to the Dawnguard, though Isran still has his suspicions of Serana's true intentions. After killing Malkus and freeing Dexion from the enthrallment he was placed under, he returns to Fort Dawnguard to read Serana's Elder Scroll to Isran, before becoming fatigued and Isran allowing him time to rest and recuperate in the fort while Serana and the player hunt down the other two Elder Scrolls. In order to enter the Soul Cairn, the player must be blooded as a vampire by Serana or be partially soul-trapped to gain access. Aside from these details, the quest lines follow a similar path to the Volkihar, but it diverges during the last story mission, when the player leads the Dawnguard's final assault on Harkon and his court to slaughter them and prevent the fulfillment of the prophecy. The player and Serana succeed in killing Harkon in a climactic showdown, effectively eliminating the great vampire threat in Skyrim. Isran thanks Serana for her support, showing newfound respect for her, and offers the player a chance to continue helping the Dawnguard in weeding out vampires that still pose a problem in Skyrim.

== Release ==
Dawnguard was announced by Bethesda Softworks on May 1, 2012, via a teaser image on the Bethesda Blog. The first trailer for the add-on was released on May 31, 2012. This showed the first gameplay footage of the add-on, which was later shown in a demo at the Electronic Entertainment Expo 2012. Bethesda announced a Dawnguard beta for Xbox 360 on June 1, 2012. On February 1, 2013, Bethesda announced on Facebook that Dawnguard will be available for the PlayStation 3 on February 26, 2013.

== Reception ==
Reception

Aggregate score
| Aggregator | Score |
|---|---|
| Metacritic | X360: 73/100; PC: 66/100; PS3: 79/100 |

Review scores
| Publication | Score |
|---|---|
| Eurogamer | 7/10 |
| Game Informer | 8.0/10 |
| GameSpot | 7.0/10 |
| GameTrailers | 7.9/10 |
| IGN | 8.0/10 |
| PC Gamer (UK) | 59% |
| The Guardian | 4/5 |

Dawnguard was released to a generally positive critical reception. IGN stated that, "Dawnguard is neither as meaty nor as cohesive as Shivering Isles, its Oblivion expansion pack counterpart, but then again it is not as expensive either. The other issue, as with any Elder Scrolls add-on content, is usefulness... but Dawnguard is certainly worth the investment." UK newspaper The Guardian was impressed with the content of the expansion, but felt that there were a few bugs in it; the newspaper stated, "If you already own a copy of Skyrim, buying Dawnguard isn't so much a good decision to make as it is a no-brainer." Wired UK was generally positive about the expansion, writing about its plot: "Dawnguard puts its own spin on the vampire theme by weaving in Elder Scrolls lore and history into the story, and offers Skyrim fans a mostly enjoyable ten to 15 hours of entertainment as a result." GameSpot enjoyed what Dawnguard had to offer, commenting on its "excellent new areas to explore" and "number of great individual moments", and stating that, "being a vampire lord can feel gleefully evil". However, they found that, "being a vampire lord can also be a headache", and complained about the number of bugs.

=== Technical issues ===
Dawnguard was released on Xbox 360 and PC on June 26, 2012. However, its PlayStation 3 release was delayed. Bethesda released a statement on their official forum stating, "The PlayStation 3 is a powerful system, and we're working hard to deliver the content you guys want. Dawnguard is obviously not the only DLC we've been working on either, so the issues of adding content get even more complicated. This is not a problem we're positive we can solve, but we are working together with Sony to try to bring you this content." Dawnguard was released on the PlayStation Network on February 26, 2013.
