= The Elder Scrolls: Castles =

2023 video game

- Developer: Bethesda Game Studios
- Publisher: Bethesda Softworks
- Series: The Elder Scrolls
- Engine: Unity
- Platforms: Android, iOS
- Release: September 10, 2024
- Genre: Construction and management simulation
- Mode: Single-player

The Elder Scrolls: Castles is a 2024 mobile video game published by Bethesda Softworks. It is similar to the game Fallout Shelter.

== Gameplay ==
The Elder Scrolls: Castles is a game in which the player trains their subjects, and performs other functions such as naming heirs and maintaining order so that their kingdom grows. The player takes the role of several different kings and queens that rule a royal dynasty and its castle. The player may customize the castle layout and can add and expand rooms, as well as decorate them and place monuments, and is also able to assign workers to stations. Each real life day spans over a full year in the game. Aside from humans, the game world is also populated by High, Dark, and Wood Elves, Khajiit, Orcs, and Argonians. Players may also create heroes to send on quests to defeat foes from Elder Scrolls games to collect valuable items. Combat involves various weapons and makes use of different skills.

== Development ==
The Elder Scrolls: Castles was released in early access in September 2023. The game was later officially announced in January 2024 and was soft-launched in the Philippines the same month. The game was released globally on September 10, 2024.

== Reception ==
Reception

Review scores
Publication	Score
GamesRadar+	2.5/5
Pocket Gamer	4/5
Multiplayer.it	7.5/10

GamesRadar+ said "The Elder Scrolls: Castles promises to put you in charge of your own castle and dynasty, and it certainly does, but managing your subjects, making rulings, crafting gear, and venturing outside to fight only to do all of the above again and again and again makes the new Elder Scrolls title lose its sheen sooner rather than later".

Pocket Gamer said "If you love Fallout Shelter and are looking for something to hold you while you wait (and wait) for Elder Scrolls VI, this game is for you".
