= The Doublets =

The Doublets (66°25′S 98°40′E) are rock outcrops located centrally on the western side of David Island. The feature was discovered and named by the Western Base party of the Australasian Antarctic Expedition (1911–14) under Douglas Mawson.
