= The Elder Scrolls IV: Knights of the Nine =

Expansion to the video game The Elder Scrolls IV: Oblivion

- Developer: Bethesda Game Studios
- Publisher: Bethesda Softworks: EU: Ubisoft
- Series: The Elder Scrolls
- Engine: Gamebryo
- Platforms: Microsoft Windows; Xbox 360; PlayStation 3
- Release: Windows, Xbox 360: NA: November 21, 2006; AU: November 23, 2006; EU: November 24, 2006; PlayStation 3: NA: March 20, 2007; AU: April 26, 2007; EU: April 27, 2007
- Genre: Action role-playing
- Mode: Single-player

The Elder Scrolls IV: Knights of the Nine is an expansion pack for the role-playing video game The Elder Scrolls IV: Oblivion. Announced on October 17, 2006, for release on November 21, 2006, the expansion was developed by Bethesda Game Studios, and published and released in North America by Bethesda Softworks; in Europe, the game was co-published with Ubisoft. The Microsoft Windows version is available either as a downloadable plug-in from the company website or as part of the retail-released Oblivion Downloadable Content Collection CD—a release that also includes all previously released official downloadable content available for Oblivion. The Xbox 360 version is available via Xbox Live Marketplace, and the PlayStation 3 version of Oblivion includes Knights of the Nine in its packaged release.

Knights of the Nine centers on a faction of the same name, devoted to locating and preserving a set of "Crusaders' Relics". Once found, these relics must be used to defeat the sorcerer-king Umaril, who seeks revenge on the Nine Divines. Knights of the Nine was generally well received in the gaming press. Although it made little change to the basic mechanics of Oblivion, it was judged by reviewers to be a brief but polished addition to the game's main plot.

== Gameplay ==
Knights of the Nine is identical to the gameplay of Oblivion; the basic design, maneuvers, and interfaces remain unchanged. As such, it is a fantasy-based role-playing adventure game. Players begin Oblivion by defining their character; deciding on its skill set, specialization, physical features, and race. Knights of the Nine is an example of open-ended-style gameplay: the main quest may be delayed or completely ignored as the player explores the game world, follows side quests, interacts with NPCs, and develops a character according to their taste. Furthering the goal of open-ended gameplay, Knights of the Nine, unlike Bethesda's prior content packs for Oblivion, begins with no explicit prodding towards the newly introduced content; players must seek out and find the game's quest without external aid.

== Plot ==
An in-game screenshot displaying the Knights of the Nine's titular "Crusader" sporting the helmet, cuirass, shield, gauntlets, greaves and mace relics of the Crusader

Knights of the Nine's quest begins as the player approaches the Chapel of Dibella in Anvil. The Anvil Chapel had recently been desecrated and everyone present had been killed. The quest proceeds as the player consults a prophet near the scene of the attack who indicates that the one responsible for the destruction is Umaril, an ancient Ayleid sorcerer-king, who escaped from his prison in the realm of Oblivion in order to destroy Cyrodiil. The prophet reveals that Umaril can only be defeated by a "Crusader" favoured by the gods and bearing the relics of Pelinal Whitestrake, the knight who had originally slew Umaril and banished his spirit to Oblivion.

The player must then make a cleansing pilgrimage to nine shrines across Cyrodiil to show their devotion to the Nine, the gods of Cyrodiil. Upon completing the pilgrimage, the player receives a vision from Whitestrake, who reveals the location of his tomb beneath a lake surrounding the Imperial City. Upon travelling to the tomb, the player discovers the Crusader's Helm, one of the Crusader relics which had belonged to Whitestrake. The player also finds the corpse of Sir Amiel, a Knight of the Nine, a member of an order dedicated to protecting the Crusader relics. Sir Amiel's diary, found on his body, reveals the location of the Priory of the Nine, which houses the Crusader Cuirass.

Upon arriving at the priory, the player must prove themselves worthy by defeating the ghost of the each old Knight of the Nine in single combat. Upon completing this trial, the player is given access to the Crusader Cuirass, and the ghosts then reveal clues about the last known location of each of the remaining relics. After collecting all eight Crusader relics, representing each of the original eight gods, the prophet gives the player the blessing of Talos, the ninth god, indicating that the blessing will allow him to completely destroy Umaril rather than simply re-banish him to Oblivion. The player, joined by new NPCs who have offered their assistance and now make up the new Knights of the Nine, attack Umaril's stronghold. The player then duels Umaril in the physical realm, before using the blessing of Talos to pursue Umaril into the spirit world and destroy his spirit. The player then wakes up in the priory among the new Knights of the Nine, who reveal that they had found the player's corpse in Umaril's stronghold. It is concluded that the Nine had resurrected the player, and the quest is complete.

== Development ==
Prior to any announcement regarding Knights of the Nine, Bethesda had pursued a somewhat novel plan to distribute downloadable content through micropayments, priced from US$0.99 to US$2.99, instead of the more common practice of releasing expansion packs. The program was initially met with criticism by customers due to its alleged low value, but later releases—at a reduced price, and with more content—proved more popular. The releases, in addition to stirring controversy, raised questions regarding Bethesda's future content release plans, and as to whether expansion pack releases were necessary at all. In August 2006, one Bethesda employee wrote in a post to Bethesda's The Elder Scrolls forums that the company had "no plans to make an expansion for Oblivion". Further questions were raised by a product listing found on game retailer GameStop's website September 11, 2006, listing a Knights of the White Stallion Expansion Pack for Oblivion. The game had a listed shipping date of November 21, 2006. The title was kept on the website only briefly—removed after gaming news site GameSpot sent Bethesda a request for comment on the product.

Knights of the Nine began its life as a supposedly "exclusive" quest for the PlayStation 3 release of The Elder Scrolls IV: Oblivion. Along with the confirmation of the PlayStation 3 release on October 9, 2006, some gaming news websites reported that the release would contain "a huge, exclusive quest" focusing on "a new faction, The Knights of the Nine". Some reports prefixed "allegedly" onto statements that the release would be exclusive. Suggestions of exclusivity, in any case, did not last long: an October 17, 2006 Bethesda press release announced that Knights of the Nine content was also scheduled for PC and Xbox 360 releases, eliciting commentary from Joystiq remarking on "how finicky" the word 'exclusive' had come to be, and Kotaku remarking on how "Oblivion's PlayStation 3 content didn't stay exclusive for long... or at all". Other sites saw no incongruence in the announcement: GameSpot assumed that Knights of the Nine was simply the earlier Knights of the White Stallion by a different name, and 1UP.com had anticipated the move ever since an IGN interview with Oblivion's executive producer Todd Howard, where Howard had described Bethesda's general aim "to have all our content available across all platforms"; the final announcement served only to confirm their suspicions.

The October 17 press release set November 21, 2006 as the North American distribution date for the Xbox 360 and PC versions of Knights of the Nine. The European release for the Xbox 360 and PC was set two days later, on November 23. The European release was co-published by Bethesda and Ubisoft. On November 9, 2006, Bethesda clarified earlier statements regarding PC releases, declaring that, although the boxed retail PC edition of Knights of the Nine was set for release on November 21, the PC release downloadable from the company website would not be available until December 4. This caused some consumer complaints, for although the Xbox 360 release was available on the Xbox Live Marketplace for 800 Microsoft Points (the equivalent of US$10.00, or GB£6.80), for the time being, PC owners had only the US$19.99 boxed retail edition of the game. The increased price of the PC's boxed retail release (The Elder Scrolls IV: Knights of Nine Oblivion Downloadable Content Collection) resulted from its inclusion of Oblivion's other previously released downloadable content. Such content was not included in either the downloadable PC release, the Xbox Marketplace download, or the PlayStation 3 edition of Oblivion. The downloadable release was ultimately issued on December 6 at the price of US$9.99. According to IGN Entertainment's GamerMetrics, a service based on compiled visitor activity information on IGN's website, the pack was the fourth most anticipated release of its release week, following Tom Clancy's Rainbow Six: Vegas, Superman Returns and College Hoops 2K7.

== Reception and legacy ==
The Elder Scrolls IV: Knights of the Nine

Aggregate scores
Aggregator	Score
GameRankings	84/100 (based on 12 reviews)
Metacritic	81/100 (PC; based on 12 reviews); 86/100 (Xbox 360; based on 8 reviews)

Review scores
Publication	Score
Eurogamer	8/10
GamePro	4.25/5
GameSpot	8.3/10
PC Format	79%
PC Gamer (UK)	74%
PC Gamer (US)	80%
PC Zone	74%

Knights of the Nine was generally well received in the gaming press. Metacritic, an aggregate review site, scored the PC version of the game with an 81 out of 100, and the Xbox 360 version of the game with an 86 out of 100. GameSpot recommended the game for its value; although it made few improvements over the basic Oblivion experience, Knights of the Nine provides "a good day or two's worth of questing for a low price". Similar comments followed from GamePro, who found that the "polish" and "affordable price" of the pack excused the fact that the pack's content "doesn't really change [Oblivion's] gameplay".

Eurogamer praised the game for its memorable plot and new, unique content. They concluded that if "more of the same is what you're after, you can't really argue with what Bethesda's served up for its hardcore fans." The review hypothesized, however, that if consumers were to fully accept individually priced content releases, Bethesda might just begin charging for all its quests.

The expansion was included in the 2025 The Elder Scrolls IV: Oblivion Remastered.
