= The Elder Scrolls =

Video game franchise

- Genre: Action role-playing
- Developers: Primary; Bethesda Softworks (1994–1998); Bethesda Game Studios (2002–present); Other; Vir2L Studios (2003–2004); TKO Software (2004); ZeniMax Online Studios (2014); Dire Wolf Digital (2017); Virtuos (2025)
- Publishers: Primary; Bethesda Softworks (1994–present); 2K Games (Oblivion only); Other; Vir2L Studios (2003–2004); Nokia (2004)
- Platforms: Android; iOS; J2ME; macOS; Windows; MS-DOS; N-Gage; Nintendo Switch; Nintendo Switch 2; PlayStation 3; PlayStation 4; PlayStation 5; Stadia; Xbox; Xbox 360; Xbox One; Xbox Series X/S
- First release: The Elder Scrolls: Arena; March 25, 1994
- Latest release: The Elder Scrolls IV: Oblivion Remastered; April 22, 2025

The Elder Scrolls is a series of action role-playing video games primarily developed by Bethesda Game Studios and published by Bethesda Softworks. The series focuses on free-form gameplay in an open world. Most games in the series have been critically and commercially successful, with The Elder Scrolls III: Morrowind (2002), The Elder Scrolls IV: Oblivion (2006) and The Elder Scrolls V: Skyrim (2011) all winning Game of the Year awards from multiple outlets. The series has sold more than 90 million copies worldwide. (Note: The Elder Scrolls Series sales: The Elder Scrolls: Arena: 120,000 sold; 1994: 90,000; 1995: 24,000; 1996: 6,000; The Elder Scrolls II: Daggerfall: 700,000 sold; The Elder Scrolls III: Morrowind: 4 million sold; The Elder Scrolls IV: Oblivion: 9.5 million sold; The Elder Scrolls V: Skyrim: 60 million sold; The Elder Scrolls Online: 15 million sold)

Within the series' fictional universe, each game takes place on the continent of Tamriel. The setting combines pre-medieval real-world elements, such as a powerful Roman-like Empire, with high fantasy medieval themes, including limited technology, widespread magic use, and the existence of many mythological creatures. The continent is split into a number of provinces inhabited by humans and humanoid fantasy races such as elves, orcs and anthropomorphic animals. A common theme in the lore is that a chosen hero (represented by the player's character) rises to defeat an impending threat, typically a malevolent being or an antagonistic army.

Since debuting with The Elder Scrolls: Arena in 1994, the series has produced a total of five main games (of which the last three have each featured two or three expansions) as well as several spin-offs. In 2014, a massively multiplayer online role-playing game, The Elder Scrolls Online, was released by Bethesda's affiliated ZeniMax subsidiary ZeniMax Online Studios.

== Development history ==
Release timeline Main series in bold
1994	**Arena**
1995
1996	**II: Daggerfall**
1997	Battlespire
1998	Adventures: Redguard
1999–2001
2002	**III: Morrowind**
2002	III: Tribunal
2003	III: Bloodmoon
2003	Travels: Stormhold
2004	Travels: Dawnstar
2004	Travels: Shadowkey
2005
2006	**IV: Oblivion**
2006	IV: Knights of the Nine
2007	IV: Shivering Isles
2008–2010
2011	**V: Skyrim**
2012	V: Dawnguard
2012	V: Hearthfire
2012	V: Dragonborn
2013
2014	Online
2015
2016	V: Special Edition
2017	Legends
2017	V VR
2017	Online Morrowind
2018	Online Summerset
2019	Online Elsweyr
2020	Blades
2020	Online Greymoor
2021	Online Blackwood
2021	V Anniversary
2022	Online High Isle
2023	Online Necrom
2024	Online Gold Road
2024	Castles
2025	IV: Oblivion Remastered
TBA	**VI: Sentinel**

=== Before The Elder Scrolls ===
Prior to working on The Elder Scrolls series, Bethesda had worked predominantly with sports and action games. In the six years from its founding to Arena's 1994 release, Bethesda had released ten games, six of them sports games, with titles such as Hockey League Simulator, NCAA Basketball: Road to the Final Four ('91/'92 Edition), and Wayne Gretzky Hockey, and the remaining four adaptations from other media, primarily the Terminator series. Bethesda's course changed abruptly when it began working on its first action role-playing game. Designer Ted Peterson recalls: "I remember talking to the guys at Sir-Tech who were doing Wizardry VII: Crusaders of the Dark Savant at the time, and them literally laughing at us for thinking we could do it." Ted Peterson worked alongside Vijay Lakshman as one of the initial designers of what became known as Arena, a "medieval-style gladiator game".

=== Arena ===
Peterson and Lakshman were joined by Julian LeFay who, according to Peterson, "really spear-headed the initial development of the series". Peterson, Lakshman, and LeFay were longtime aficionados of pen-and-paper role-playing games, which greatly influenced the creation of the world of Tamriel. They were also fans of Looking Glass Studios' Ultima Underworld series, their main inspiration for Arena. Initially, Arena was not to be a role-playing game at all. The player, and a team of their fighters, would travel the world, fighting other teams in their arenas until the player became "grand champion" in the world's capital, the Imperial City. Along the way, side quests of a more role-playing nature could be completed. As the process of development progressed, however, the tournaments became less important and the side quests more. Role-playing game elements were added, as it expanded to include cities outside the arenas, and dungeons beyond the cities. Eventually it was decided to drop the idea of tournaments altogether, and focus on quests and dungeons, making the game a "full-blown [role-playing game]". Although the team had dropped all arena combat from the game, all the material had already been printed up with the title, so the game went to market as The Elder Scrolls: Arena. Lakshman, who then worked at Christopher Weaver's Bethesda Softworks, came up with the name of The Elder Scrolls and the words eventually came to mean "Tamriel's mystical tomes of knowledge that told of its past, present, and future". The game's initial voice-over was changed in response, beginning: "It has been foretold in the Elder Scrolls ..."

Bethesda missed their Christmas 1993 deadline for releasing Arena, and the game was released in the first quarter of 1994 instead, a "really serious [mistake] for a small developer/publisher like Bethesda Softworks". The packaging included a scantily clad female warrior, which further contributed to distributor concern, leading to an initial distribution of only 20,000 units. Having missed the Christmas sales season, the development team was concerned that they "had screwed the company". Nevertheless, sales continued to grow, month after month, as news of the game was passed by word-of-mouth. Despite some initial software bugs, and the formidable demands the game made on players' machines, it became a cult hit. Evaluations of the game's success varied from "modest" to "wild". Still, the game maintained traction with its audience. Game historian Matt Barton concluded that "the game set a new standard for this type of role-playing video game, and demonstrated just how much room was left for innovation".

=== Daggerfall ===
A first-person screenshot from Daggerfall, demonstrating the user interface and graphical capabilities of the game

Work on The Elder Scrolls II: Daggerfall began after Arena's release in March 1994. Ted Peterson was assigned the role of lead game designer. He endeavoured to make Daggerfall's plot less "clichéd" than Arena's and involve a "complex series of adventures leading to multiple resolutions". With Daggerfall, Arena's experience-point-based system was replaced with one rewarding the player for conducting role-playing activities with their character. Daggerfall came equipped with an improved character generation engine, one that included a GURPS-influenced class creation system, offering players the chance to create their own classes, and assign their own skills. Daggerfall was developed with an XnGine engine, one of the first truly 3D engines. Daggerfall realized a game world the size of Great Britain, filled with 15,000 towns and a population of 750,000. It was influenced by analog games and literature that Julian LeFay or Ted Peterson happened to be playing or reading at the time, such as Dumas's The Man in the Iron Mask and Vampire: The Masquerade. It was released in September 1996. Like Arena, Daggerfall's initial release suffered from some bugs, leaving consumers disgruntled. These early anomalies were fixed in later versions. This experience led to a more prudent release schedule for future games.

=== Battlespire and Redguard ===
Following the release of Daggerfall, work began on three separate projects at once: An Elder Scrolls Legend: Battlespire, The Elder Scrolls Adventures: Redguard, and The Elder Scrolls III: Morrowind. Battlespire, originally titled Dungeon of Daggerfall: Battlespire, was the first of the three to be released, on November 30, 1997. Originally designed as an expansion pack for Daggerfall, it was eventually rebranded as a standalone game. Battlespire focused on dungeon romping and offered multiplayer gaming in the form of a player versus player deathmatch mode, the only series title to do so prior to the release of The Elder Scrolls Online in 2014. Redguard was the second of the three titles to be released, on October 31, 1998. It was an action-adventure game inspired by Tomb Raider, Prince of Persia, and the Ultima series. Redguard did not offer the player the chance to create their own character. Instead, players would play the prefabricated "Cyrus the Redguard". Both games did poorly with Bethesda's target audience. Players used to the vast open spaces of Daggerfall did not take well to the reduced worlds of Redguard and Battlespire. Based upon its customers' clear desire for massive role-playing game worlds, Bethesda redoubled its efforts to build the next major chapter.

=== Morrowind ===
A third-person screenshot from the game, demonstrating Morrowind’s advanced graphics: pixel-shaded water; long render distances; and detailed textures and models.

The third title in The Elder Scrolls series was conceived during the development of Daggerfall. Initially designed to encompass the whole province of Morrowind and allow the player to join all five Dunmer Great Houses, it was decided that the scope of the game was too much for the technology available at the time. At publication, it covered the province's central isle of Vvardenfell and allowed the player to join three of the Great Houses. The XnGine was scrapped and replaced with Numerical Design Limited's Gamebryo, a Direct3D-powered engine with transform, clipping, and lighting capacity, 32-bit textures and skeletal animation. It was decided that the game world would be populated using the methods the team had developed in Redguard; with the game objects crafted by hand, rather than generated using random algorithmic methods.

The project took "close to 100-man-years to create". Bethesda tripled their staff and spent the first year developing The Elder Scrolls Construction Set. This allowed the game staff to easily balance the game and to modify it in small increments rather than large. Ted Peterson, who had left following the release of Daggerfall, returned to work as an author of in-game material, and as a general consultant on the lore-based aspects of the work. The PC version of Morrowind had gone gold by April 23, 2002, and was released on May 1 in North America, with the Xbox release set at June 7. On January 3, Bethesda announced that game publisher Ubisoft would take control of Morrowind's European distribution, in addition to those of eight other Bethesda games.

The expansion pack The Elder Scrolls III: Tribunal went gold on November 1 and was released, with little fanfare, on November 6. Tribunal puts the player in the self-contained, walled city of Mournhold, which can be teleported to from Morrowind's land mass. Development on the expansion began after Morrowind shipped, giving the developers a mere five-month development cycle to release the game. The prior existence of the Construction Set, however, meant that the team "already had the tools in place to add content and features very quickly". Interface improvements, and specifically an overhaul of Morrowind's journal system, were among the key goals. Morrowind's second expansion, The Elder Scrolls III: Bloodmoon, went gold by May 23, and was released on June 6. It had been worked on since the release of Tribunal. In the expansion, the player travels to the frozen island of Solstheim and is asked to investigate the uneasiness of the soldiers stationed there.

=== Oblivion ===
An in-game screenshot showing Oblivion's user interface, HDR lighting and long draw distance, changes made as part of a goal to create "cutting-edge graphics"

Work on The Elder Scrolls IV: Oblivion began in 2002, after Morrowind's publication. Oblivion was developed by Bethesda Softworks, and the initial Xbox 360 and PC releases were co-published by Bethesda and Take-Two Interactive subsidiary 2K Games. Oblivion was released on March 21, 2006. The game centers around an event referred to as "The Oblivion Crisis", where portals to the planes of Oblivion open and release hordes of Daedra upon Tamriel. Developers working on Oblivion focused on providing a tighter storyline, more developed characters, and to make information in the game world more accessible to players. Oblivion features improved AI, improved physics, and improved graphics. Bethesda developed and implemented procedural content creation tools in the creation of Oblivion's terrain, leading to landscapes that are more complex and realistic than those of past titles, but had less of a drain on Bethesda's staff. Two downloadable expansion packs, Knights of the Nine and Shivering Isles were released in 2006 and 2007, respectively. Knights of the Nine added a questline surrounding the search for a set of Crusader relics, while Shivering Isles added the eponymous plane to the game.

A remaster of Oblivion was revealed and subsequently released on April 22, 2025.

=== Skyrim ===
A third-person screenshot from Skyrim

In August 2010, Todd Howard revealed Bethesda was working on a game that had been in development since the release of Oblivion, and that progress was very far along. While the game was conceptualized after Oblivion's release, main development was restricted until after Fallout 3 was released. In November, Kristian West, then the editor-in-chief of Eurogamer's Danish outlet, reported overhearing a developer on a plane talking about the project; a new The Elder Scrolls game, although Bethesda did not comment on the report. At the Spike Video Game Awards in December, Howard appeared on stage to unveil a teaser trailer and announce the title of the game. The Elder Scrolls V: Skyrim was released on November 11, 2011, to widespread critical acclaim. It was awarded 'Game of the Year' by IGN, Spike and others. The game is set after the events of Oblivion, when the great dragon Alduin the World Eater returns to Skyrim; a beast whose existence threatens all life in Tamriel. The setting is heavily based on Scandinavia, as seen in the climate and creatures the character encounters. Three pieces of add-ons were released on PC and Xbox 360 in 2012 – Dawnguard, Hearthfire and Dragonborn, with a PlayStation 3 release in February 2013. Dawnguard added two joinable factions and an associated questline revolving around Vampires and the Dawnguard, a group of vampire hunters, while Hearthfire added more home customization options including a house creation kit and the ability to adopt children. Dragonborn added the island of Solstheim to the northeast. On October 28, 2016, Skyrim – Special Edition was released. In 2016, on the fifth anniversary of Skyrim's release, Zen Studios developed and released a virtual pinball adaptation of the game as part of the Bethesda Pinball collection, which became available as part of Zen Pinball 2, Pinball FX 2 and Pinball FX 3, as well as a separate free-to-play app for iOS and Android mobile devices. On November 17, 2017, Skyrim VR was released for PlayStation 4. On June 10, 2018, Skyrim: Very Special Edition, a voice-activated text adventure game poking fun at the game's many releases, was released for Amazon Alexa devices. The player character, Dragonborn, is a downloadable Mii fighter costume in the Nintendo crossover fighting game Super Smash Bros. Ultimate.

=== The Elder Scrolls Online and Legends ===
On May 3, 2012, The Elder Scrolls Online was revealed. The Elder Scrolls Online was released for Windows and macOS on April 4, 2014, with the Xbox One and PlayStation 4 versions initially slated to follow in June 2014 but later delayed until June 9, 2015. The game originally required a subscription to play, but this requirement was dropped on March 17, 2015. There is however a subscription service entitled "ESO Plus" which grants access to all current and future downloadable content (DLC). The DLC is otherwise available for individual purchase in the Crown Store. Additionally, the optional subscription grants various perks that allow players to progress slightly faster than a free player, and grants them a payment of 1650 crowns per month. On June 14, 2015, The Elder Scrolls: Legends, a collectible card game, was announced by Bethesda during the Electronic Entertainment Expo 2015. It was released on March 9, 2017, for Microsoft Windows and later that year for Android, iOS, and macOS. The game's servers remained online until January 30, 2025.

=== Blades and Castles ===
At Bethesda's E3 2018 press conference, Todd Howard announced The Elder Scrolls: Blades, originally planned for release in Q3 2018, and it was originally expected to be released for Apple and Android phones first, followed by PC and console, including VR. The player is able to play as a member of the faction called the Blades, who has returned home to their town to find it destroyed. There are survival, arena, and town-building modes, with multiplayer support through its arena and town-building mode, as well as cross-platform. The game is also able to be played in portrait mode, unusual for a role-playing game. The early access of Blades began March 27, 2019 for those who pre-ordered the game. Blades was expected to be fully released some time in early 2019, before being released for Android, iOS and Nintendo Switch in May 2020. Blades was later shut down on June 30, 2026. The Elder Scrolls: Castles, a mobile spin-off game similar to Fallout Shelter, was released for Android in early access on September 28, 2023, formally releasing on Android and iOS on September 10, 2024.

=== Sentinel ===
Elder Scrolls VI was first announced as being in pre-production during E3 2018, along with Starfield. Phil Spencer said that The Elder Scrolls VI would be coming out after Playground Games' Fable title. The game was expected to be released exclusively on PC and Xbox, following Microsoft's 2021 acquisition of Bethesda. In late 2025, Todd Howard commented on the latest installment to the series, asking for patience from fans and stating the game is still a long way off. In a March 2026 interview with IGN, Howard stated that "builds of the game are consistently working every day."

== Gameplay ==
The Elder Scrolls games are action role-playing games and include elements taken from action and adventure games. In Arena, players advance by killing monsters (and thereby gaining experience points) until a preset value is met, whereupon they level-up. However, in Daggerfall, Morrowind, and Oblivion, the series took a skill-based approach to character advancement. Players develop their characters' skills by applying them and only level-up when a certain set of skills have been developed. Skyrim took a new approach, where the more a skill is leveled, the more it helps to level the character. This shifted the focus away from character creation and more onto character development. The flexibility of the games' engines has facilitated the release of game extensions (or mods) through The Elder Scrolls Construction Set.

The Elder Scrolls main series of games emphasizes different aspects of the gaming experience than most role-playing games. A brief article by Joystiq in early November 2006 compared BioWare's creations to Bethesda's by noting a difference in emphasis. Bethesda's creations focused on "aesthetic presentation and open-ended adventuring"; BioWare's on a combat system and modular architecture. This overarching aim has been noted by their designers as well. Bethesda has described their motivations in creating the first series game, Arena, as those of any good pen-and-paper role-playing games: creating an environment in which the player could be what the player wants and do what the player wants. Daggerfall's manual begins with a design manifesto, declaring the developers' intention to "create a book with blank pages" and "a game designed to encourage exploration and reward curiosity". Choices, in the form of paths taken by the player, to do good, to chase after evil, are left open to the player, "just like in real life". This design trend continued with Morrowind, following the hiatus of similarly epic games in the interim, though Joystiq's previously noted insistence on graphics came again to the fore. During the development of Morrowind, Bethesda tripled its staff, so as to perfectly color its newly hand-made world. In their own words, "We knew we had to exceed the visual polish of the other games on the market, and we made it our goal to put The Elder Scrolls back into the forefront of game innovation."

== Series overview ==
=== Setting ===
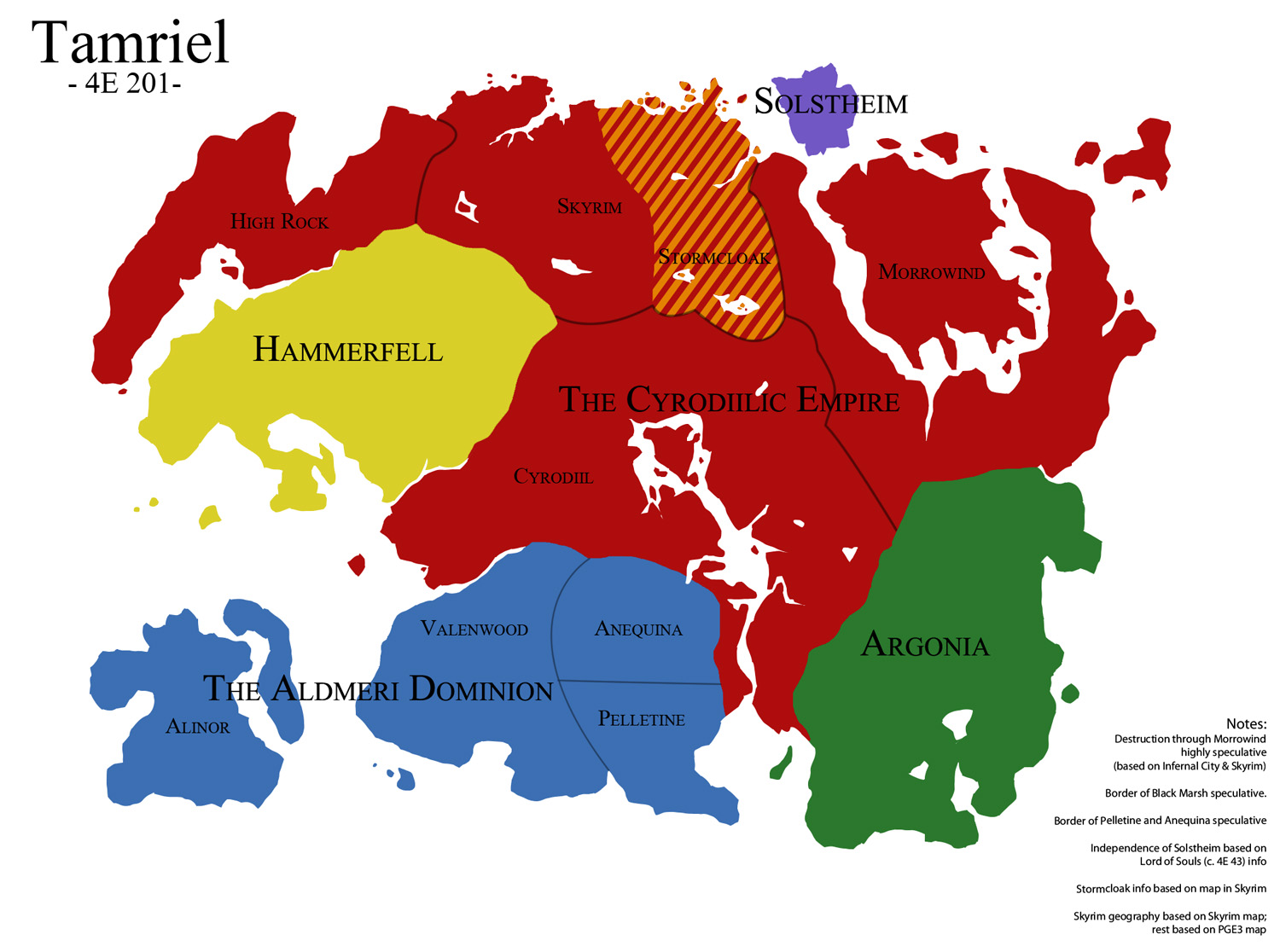
Map of Tamriel, c. 4E 201 (beginning of Skyrim)

The Elder Scrolls takes place in a high fantasy world with influences from real world cultures. Like most works of high fantasy, The Elder Scrolls games are typically serious in tone and epic in scope, dealing with themes of a grand struggle against a supernatural or evil force.

Many races exist in the world of The Elder Scrolls, some typical of high fantasy works, such as humans, orcs and elves; some atypical, such as the lizard-like Argonians and cat-like Khajiit; and some subversions, such as the extinct Dwemer, known colloquially as "dwarves", who follow the high fantasy stereotype of being subterranean, skilled metallurgists and masons, but are actually classified as a variety of elf who are highly technologically advanced. As is also typical in high fantasy works, magic and sorcery, mythical creatures, factions with their own political agendas, walled medieval cities and strongholds, and plot elements driven by prophecies and legends are common.

The Elder Scrolls is known for its attention to detail, including extensive lore, scenery and backstory. There is no omniscient narrator. Instead, the lore is presented in-universe, as written by the fictional scholars who inhabit the world, and it is subject to their biases and speculation. Players are encouraged to form their own interpretations of the lore and have developed extensive fan works. The developers avoid invalidating or overruling fan theories through canon. Internal inconsistencies are explained as errors in scholarship. Some inconsistencies, such as incorporating mutually exclusive endings to earlier games, are intentionally introduced and explained as magical paradoxes. Other elements of the lore are intentionally contradictory or made ambiguous to allow players to decide for themselves what is true. Players can, for example, deny being a prophesied hero or accept the role.

The first game in the series, Arena, featured little in the way of lore and lacked many elements that would come to define the series. An elaborate system of gods and myths was introduced in the second game, Daggerfall. The lore's complexity came from a desire to improve on the writing in Arena, which had been criticized as lackluster.

After Daggerfall, the designers focused on further expanding the lore once they realized they still did not know much about the world's fictional history or religions. The series' fictional cosmology is inspired by Gnosticism. There are contradictory creation myths, one of which claims that some of the gods were tricked into creating the mortal world, surrendering a portion of their power. These became the Eight Divines (also known as Aedra), who are worshipped as benevolent deities. A Ninth Divine, Talos, was added upon the death of Tiber Septim, who was the first to unite Tamriel under a single empire. Tiber Septim's apotheosis as Talos remains controversial, especially among elven races, and is one of the major conflicts of The Elder Scrolls V: Skyrim. A separate pantheon of more demonic deities known as the Daedra retain their full power and reside in Oblivion, a separate dimension. Individual Daedra are not necessarily evil, though they are often depicted as lacking empathy. Some races retain their own pantheons or have syncretised them with the Imperial religion.

The Elder Scrolls games primarily take place on the continent of Tamriel, located on the planet of Nirn. The exceptions are An Elder Scrolls Legend: Battlespire, which is set in a different dimension; portions of The Elder Scrolls IV: Oblivion and the entirety of its expansion, Shivering Isles, which take place in Oblivion; quests in Oblivion during the Dawnguard and Dragonborn add-ons of The Elder Scrolls V: Skyrim; and further quests in Oblivion from The Elder Scrolls Online. Other continents exist on Nirn aside from Tamriel, such as Akavir, Pyandonea, Yokuda, and Atmora, but the people of Tamriel have little to no contact with these other continents and therefore do not possess much verifiable knowledge about them.

Tamriel comprises nine provinces, each of which is dominated by a distinct race: Black Marsh is home to the Argonians; Cyrodiil is home to the Imperials; Elsweyr is home to the Khajiit; Hammerfell is home to the Redguards; High Rock is home to the Bretons; Morrowind is home to the Dunmer, or Dark Elves; Skyrim is home to the Nords; Summerset Isle is home to the Altmer, or High Elves; and Valenwood is home to the Bosmer, or Wood Elves. A tenth race, the Orsimer, or Orcs, reside in settlements scattered across Tamriel and, at some points in history, a kingdom inside High Rock known as Orsinium. Each province is shared by many races, as this notion is a point of tension in Elder Scrolls V.

Although various empires have controlled Tamriel over its several thousand years of recorded history, most games in the series have taken place during the Third Cyrodiilic Empire, which initially unites the entire continent under the reign of the Septim dynasty. In Arena, players are tasked with freeing the Emperor Uriel Septim VII from a magical prison engineered by his court wizard, who has usurped the throne and magically disguised himself as the Emperor. In Daggerfall, Uriel VII tasks the player with finding a powerful artifact. The player can give it to any of several factions, which will use it to reshape the regional power structure. In Morrowind, the player is prophesied to be the reincarnation of a great elven hero. Taking advantage of this, the Empire tasks the player with stabilizing the province of Morrowind by putting down a rebellion by a would-be god. In Oblivion, a religious cult opens a dimensional gate to a Hell-like realm and throws the Empire into chaos by killing Uriel VII and all of his known heirs. Although the player assists an illegitimate royal heir in closing the dimensional gate, the heir's heroic sacrifice brings an abrupt end to the Septim bloodline, causing a succession crisis that devastates the Empire and reduces it to a rump state. In Skyrim, the Empire (now ruled by the Mede dynasty) is recovering from a horrific war against an elven separatist ethnostate, the Aldmeri Dominion, which covers most of southwest Tamriel, and whose terms of surrender have weakened the Empire even further and ultimately led to an ongoing civil war in the province of Skyrim. Amid these mounting tensions, Tamriel has to face the return of a legendary dragon known as "the World-Eater", long after dragons were thought to have gone extinct.

The Elder Scrolls Online serves as a prequel to the Third Empire storyline, taking place in the middle of a 600-year interregnum between the Second and Third Cyrodiilic Empires. The initial game follows the player, who has been sacrificed by followers of the Daedric prince Molag Bal, as they manage to return to the mortal plane with the help of a former Emperor masquerading as a prophet. The player must join one of the three different military alliances that are vying for control of Tamriel in the Three Banners War, but is ultimately tasked with uniting all three factions against Molag Bal's attempt to assimilate the entirety of the planet Nirn into his realm of Coldharbour.

The Elder Scrolls themselves play a very limited role in the storyline of the series, usually only as a framing plot device (i.e. "[the events in this game] were foretold in the Elder Scrolls..."). The Elder Scrolls are rarely referenced in the games. The Elder Scrolls IV: Oblivion marks the first appearance of the Scrolls in the final quest of the Thieves Guild questline. The Scroll appears as an incomprehensible chart containing luminous glyphs. Oblivion further introduces monks who dedicate their lives to the study of the scrolls. In The Elder Scrolls V: Skyrim, the Scrolls are integrated into the series' creation myth and are portrayed as potentially causing insanity when deciphered. The Scrolls are used in the main quest to travel back in time and learn how to defeat the antagonist, an immortal dragon. Skyrim's Dawnguard expansion adds a quest to acquire the Scrolls to either assist or stop a vampire from blotting out the sun.

=== Future ===
At E3 2016, Bethesda Game Studios director Todd Howard reported that the studio was already working on a sixth installment in The Elder Scrolls franchise, although it would still be "a very long way off" and at E3 2017, Bethesda Softworks vice president of public relations stated that no new title was in active development, and that they have "at least two major titles" to complete before this would change. At E3 2018, Howard presented a short teaser trailer for The Elder Scrolls VI and announced that it would be released following Starfield. In an interview in June 2023, Howard also stated that it may be the last Elder Scrolls game he makes. Information about "early builds" of the game were mentioned in 2024 with Howard stating in 2026 that the new game would run on an updated Creation Engine.

== Other media ==
In 2009, science-fiction author Gregory Keyes released The Infernal City, a novel set approximately 40 years after the Oblivion Crisis. Lord of Souls was released in 2011 as Keyes's second novel in his The Elder Scrolls book series.

== Reception ==
Aggregate review scores
Game	GameRankings	Metacritic
The Elder Scrolls: Arena	(PC) 80%	—
The Elder Scrolls II: Daggerfall	(PC) 79%	—
An Elder Scrolls Legend: Battlespire	(PC) 63%	—
The Elder Scrolls Adventures: Redguard	(PC) 78%	—
The Elder Scrolls III: Morrowind	(PC) 89% (Xbox) 87%	(PC) 89 (Xbox) 87
The Elder Scrolls III: Tribunal	(PC) 81%	(PC) 80
The Elder Scrolls III: Bloodmoon	(PC) 83%	(PC) 85
The Elder Scrolls Travels: Shadowkey	(NG) 56%	—
The Elder Scrolls IV: Oblivion	(X360) 94% (PC) 93% (PS3) 93%	(X360) 94 (PC) 94 (PS3) 93
The Elder Scrolls IV: Knights of the Nine	(PC) 83%	(PC) 81
The Elder Scrolls IV: Shivering Isles	(X360) 88% (PC) 87%	(X360) 86 (PC) 86
The Elder Scrolls V: Skyrim	(X360) 95% (PC) 94% (PS3) 88%	(X360) 96 (PC) 94 (PS3) 92
The Elder Scrolls V: Skyrim – Dawnguard	(PS3) 79% (X360) 76% (PC) 69%	(PS3) 79 (X360) 73 (PC) 66
The Elder Scrolls V: Skyrim – Hearthfire	(PS3) 74% (X360) 62%	(PS3) 69 (X360) 54
The Elder Scrolls V: Skyrim – Dragonborn	(PS3) 83% (PC) 83% (X360) 83%	(PC) 83 (PS3) 82 (X360) 82
The Elder Scrolls Online	(PC) 71%	(PC) 71
The Elder Scrolls: Legends	(PC) 82% (iOS) 77%	(PC) 80
The Elder Scrolls: Castles	—	(iOS) 56
The Elder Scrolls IV: Oblivion Remastered	—	(PS5) 82 (XSXS) 82 (PC) 80

In 2012, Complex ranked The Elder Scrolls at number 20 on the list of the best video game franchises. In 2013, The Elder Scrolls was voted as the Greatest Game Series of the Decade on GameSpot, beating out 64 other competitors. The Elder Scrolls reached the final round, beating the Grand Theft Auto series by a margin of 52.5% of the vote for The Elder Scrolls to 47.5% for Grand Theft Auto.

=== Controversies ===
The fourth main game of the series, Oblivion, was initially released with a Teen rating by the ESRB, but after reports that its developers failed to disclose content that would not be encountered through normal gameplay but would be inconsistent with that rating, the ESRB took a second look at Oblivion that took the obscured content into consideration and in an unprecedented move that drew significant media coverage, raised the game's rating to Mature.

In August 2011, Bethesda Softworks contacted the developer of Minecraft, Mojang, claiming that the intended trademark of the title Scrolls for its new game breached Bethesda's trademark on The Elder Scrolls. On March 10, 2012, Markus Persson tweeted that the two had come to an agreement over the use of the name. The agreement prohibits Mojang from using the title Scrolls in any future sequels of the game.

In May 2019, Bethesda Softworks released a promotional free tabletop role-playing game titled Elsweyr. It was accused of being plagiarized as it shared a very similar plot to the Dungeons & Dragons adventure "The Black Road", written by Paige Leitman and Ben Heisler, and contains reworded text that substitutes some words for synonyms. After Leitman posted about the similarities on Facebook, the game was removed from their The Elder Scrolls Online Facebook page.
