= The Wayward Realms =

Upcoming video game

- Developer: OnceLost Games
- Publisher: OnceLost Games
- Directors: Ted Peterson; Julian LeFay
- Composer: Eric Heberling
- Engine: Proprietary based on Wicked Engine
- Platform: Windows
- Genre: Action role-playing

The Wayward Realms is an upcoming open world action role-playing video game developed by OnceLost Games. The game's development is led by Ted Peterson and was formerly co-led by the late Julian LeFay, both former Bethesda Softworks developers best known for their role in creating The Elder Scrolls series. The game is intended to serve as a spiritual successor to The Elder Scrolls: Arena and The Elder Scrolls II: Daggerfall.

== Gameplay ==
The Wayward Realms is an action role-playing game played from a first-person perspective, in which the player can explore an open world, fight hostile enemies, talk to non-player characters, and complete quests. The game features several gameplay mechanics similar to Daggerfall, including a life-sized procedurally generated open world, the ability to craft spells, climb walls, buy a boat, ride a horse, as well as a complex faction reputation system and class creation system.

== Story ==
The Wayward Realms is set on a group of over one hundred islands, known collectively as the Archipelago, where different factions and kingdoms vie for influence and power. The game foregoes a traditional main quest and instead allows the player to guide the story through their actions and have the game react dynamically, similar to a game master in a traditional tabletop roleplaying game.

== Development ==
In 2017, while researching for a video on the history of The Elder Scrolls, YouTuber Ian Phoenix became curious about the fate of Julian LeFay, who despite being credited with co-creating The Elder Scrolls series and leading the development of Arena, Daggerfall and Battlespire, had disappeared from the public eye after leaving Bethesda Softworks in 1998. He was able to track him down and arrange a remote interview. The discussion went on for over 3 hours. LeFay soon followed it up with a Reddit AMA a month later. In 2018, Ted Peterson, another Elder Scrolls co-founder, commented on the video and Phoenix arranged an interview with him as well. After releasing both interviews and his Elder Scrolls retrospective video to his YouTube channel, Phoenix was approached by video game agent Stefan Metaxa with the idea of getting Julian LeFay and Ted Peterson to work together on a new open world roleplaying game in the spirit of the early Elder Scrolls games.

In 2019, Phoenix, LeFay, and Peterson, along with Arena lead director Vijay Lakshman, officially founded the independent game studio OnceLost Games, and they began development on The Wayward Realms. They also announced that Arena and Daggerfall composer Eric Heberling would be returning to compose the game's soundtrack. In addition, Douglas Goodall, a writer and quest designer for The Elder Scrolls III: Morrowind, joined the team in late 2019. The news garnered a fair amount of media attention, and the team was soon approached by a major video game publisher with an offer of $8 million, however Vijay Lakshman reportedly rejected this offer believing that they needed at least $12 million in order to compete with The Elder Scrolls VI and Cyberpunk 2077. Unable to find a traditional publisher to fully fund their project based on pitch alone, the team shifted their focus toward creating a playable build of the game with a team of over 40 volunteer writers, artists, and programmers, which they could then shop around to publishers.

On September 1, 2020, after 18 months of development, Ian Phoenix released a public statement saying that he would be leaving the project, citing his frustrations with the lack of progress, lack of communication from the founders, and the amount he was spending out of pocket on the project, although he emphasized that he held no grudge against the team and still wished them success. He also implied that at least two other Bethesda veterans had left around the same time. Ted Peterson responded with a statement saying that he did not deny the validity of Ian's claims and apologized to him for his lack of communication, but added that development issues of this kind were common in the industry and that the team was still dedicated to bringing a spiritual successor to Daggerfall to life.

Despite the departure of Phoenix, the team continued to work on the project over the next four years, periodically posting concept art, Q&A Interviews, screenshots, and eventually pre-alpha gameplay footage to their social media accounts. On May 30, 2024, the team launched a Kickstarter campaign with the goal of raising $500,000 to fund one full year of development on an early access build, with the hope of then finding a publisher. The campaign reached their goal within 12 days, raising $701,900 in total over its 30-day run.

On July 16, 2025, OnceLost Games released a statement to their YouTube channel revealing that Julian LeFay had been battling cancer for several years, and due to worsening health would be stepping back from the team. In regard to the future of the project they added, "Anticipating this possibility, Julian has documented his vision and concepts well, ensuring the team is left with the resources needed to complete the game." He died on July 22, 2025.

On December 1, 2025, OnceLost Games announced via their social media accounts that they would be fully moving away from Unreal Engine in favor of building their own proprietary engine for the game. They added that in doing so, it would be necessary to delay the release of the early access build to June 2026.
