= The Terminator: Rampage =

1993 video game

- Cover art by Simon Bisley
- Developer: Bethesda Softworks
- Publisher: Bethesda Softworks
- Producer: Christopher Weaver
- Designer: Vijay Lakshman
- Programmer: Craig Walton
- Artist: Rick Kauzlarich
- Composer: Eric Heberling
- Series: Terminator
- Platform: DOS
- Release: December 1993
- Genre: First-person shooter
- Mode: Single-player

The Terminator: Rampage is a first-person shooter video game released for personal computers with the operating system DOS by Bethesda Softworks in 1993. It is the third game based on the Terminator film series that was made by Bethesda, following The Terminator and The Terminator 2029.

== Gameplay ==
Original PC version screenshot

The Terminator: Rampage is played as a first‑person shooter in which the player moves through the Cyberdyne building’s 32 floors, navigating its interior spaces while engaging Skynet‑controlled robots and cyborgs.

The player starts the game armed with a Beretta 9mm, but can also acquire an Uzi 9mm, AK-47, SPAS-12 shotgun, HK-95 minicannon (similar to a M134 Minigun) and an M-30 grenade launcher.

The player progresses by exploring each level, locating and collecting the scattered components of the V‑TEC PPC weapon, and using conventional firearms and other available tools to fight enemies encountered throughout the facility. The structure of play centers on advancing through floors, defeating hostile units, and assembling the necessary equipment to complete the game’s objective.

== Plot ==
Skynet has sent a computer core containing its core programming back to 1984, shortly before its ultimate defeat at the hands of John Connor's human resistance in 2024. The computer core (known as the Meta-Node) arrives at Cyberdyne Systems' headquarters at the Cheyenne Mountain Complex, and proceeds to take over the building and begin manufacturing an army of Terminators. A lone commando is sent into the past by John Connor, arriving there in 1988. His mission is to destroy the Skynet computer core and eliminate the threat of Skynet once and for all. To do so, players must explore the 32 floors of the Cyberdyne building, fighting off various Skynet robots and cyborgs while assembling the pieces of a prototype plasma weapon called the V-TEC PPC (Phased Plasma Cannon), the only means of destroying the Meta-Node.

== Development ==
The Terminator: Rampage used the same engine as The Elder Scrolls: Arena. According to Bethesda, the game was influential in the development of Doom. Id Software showed a lot of interest in the production of this particular game at Bethesda's stands at various trade shows.

The game's Chief Designer was Vijay Lakshman.

== Release ==
The game was released on both floppy disk and CD-ROM, with the latter adding several additional cinematics, more starting ammunition, and patching some minor glitches found in the floppy version.

== Reception ==
Reception

Review scores
Publication	Score
Aktueller Software Markt	10/12
PC Player	49/100
Pelit	70/100
PC Joker	52%

Computer Gaming World in February 1994 said that the game resembled Doom "though the gameplay doesn't compare. Action, regardless of difficulty, is intense". The magazine said in March 1994 that the game was "a decent attempt for an imitative product, but you might say that the effort to catch-up and cash-in on id Software's success was doomed from the beginning".

Roy Bassave of Odessa American said in May 1994 "No special glasses needed to enjoy this very real Virtual Reality experience. The closest thing is Capstone's "Corridor 7" game with Wolfenstein 3D programming.

Website Just Games Retro gave the game 2/5 stars, highlighting the poor framerate (regardless of the hardware it is run on), enormous levels with excessive key hunting, and limited action compared to similar first person shooters of the era.

The game sold 30,000 units in its first week.
