= Ted Peterson (writer) =

Writer and video game designer

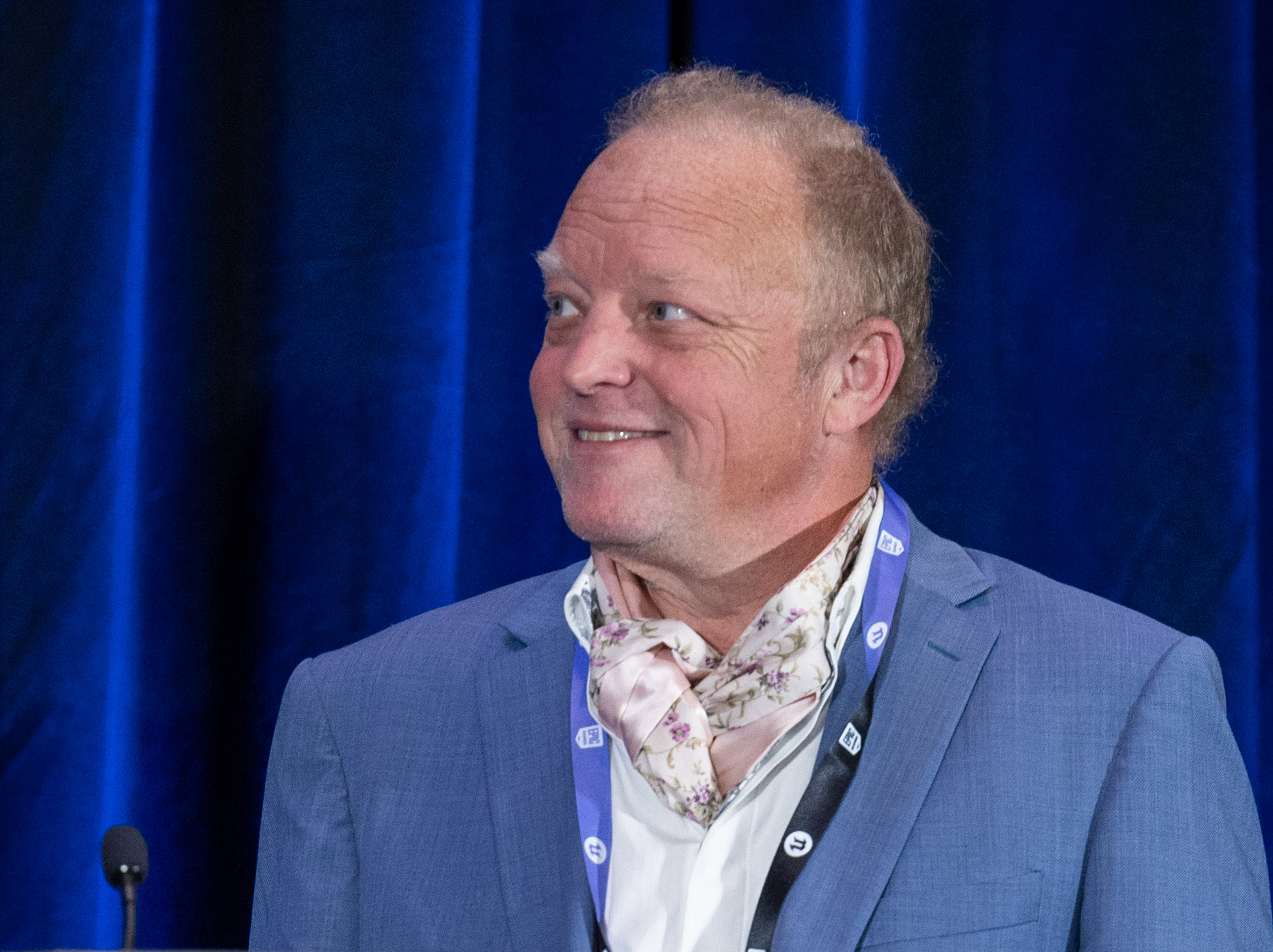
- Peterson in 2024
- Occupations: Writer; video game designer
- Known for: The Elder Scrolls series

Ted Peterson is a writer and video game designer best known for his work on The Elder Scrolls series. He co-founded the independent game studio OnceLost Games with Julian LeFay and Vijay Lakshman in 2019.

== Career ==
Peterson joined Bethesda Softworks as a junior writer in the early 1990s after responding to an advertisement in The Washington Post. His first project at Bethesda was writing for The Terminator 2029, followed by The Terminator: Rampage. During his time at Bethesda, he worked as a designer and writer on The Elder Scrolls: Arena and lead designer on The Elder Scrolls II: Daggerfall. He left the company in 1996, just as Daggerfall was completed. After leaving Bethesda, Peterson joined Activision and worked as a writer on Heavy Gear II, also performing freelance work for Bethesda on The Elder Scrolls III: Morrowind and The Elder Scrolls IV: Oblivion. As a writer for Bethesda, Peterson wrote almost 200,000 words of prose within in-game books in The Elder Scrolls.

Peterson worked at Savage Entertainment for ten years, contributing to games such as Star Wars: Battlefront II (PSP; 2005) and WALL-E (2008). He has also worked for Electronic Arts and Disney.

In 2019, Peterson co-founded the independent game studio OnceLost Games alongside former Bethesda developers Julian LeFay and Vijay Lakshman. The studio is developing The Wayward Realms, described as a "spiritual successor to Daggerfall", funded by a successful Kickstarter campaign.

== Games ==
List of video games worked on by Ted Peterson
Year	Title	Role(s)	Notes
1992	The Terminator 2029	Writer	
1993	The Terminator: Rampage	Writer	
1994	The Elder Scrolls: Arena	Designer and writer	
1996	The Elder Scrolls II: Daggerfall	Lead designer	
1997	Zork: Grand Inquisitor	Designer	
1999	Heavy Gear II	Writer	
2002	The Elder Scrolls III: Morrowind	Additional Writing & Quest Design	
2005	Star Wars: Battlefront II (PSP)		
2006	The Elder Scrolls IV: Oblivion	Additional Writing	
TBD	The Wayward Realms		

== Television ==
- Bones season 12, story writer and editor
