= The Elder Scrolls Adventures: Redguard =

1998 video game

- Developers: Bethesda Softworks; XL Translab
- Publisher: Bethesda Softworks
- Director: Todd Howard
- Designers: Todd Howard; Michael Kirkbride; Kurt Kuhlmann
- Programmer: Andrew Taylor
- Artist: John Pearson
- Writers: Todd Howard; Michael Kirkbride; Kurt Kuhlmann
- Composers: Chip Ellinghaus; Grant Slawson
- Series: The Elder Scrolls
- Engine: XnGine
- Platform: MS-DOS
- Release: NA: November 16, 1998; EU: March 26, 1999
- Genre: Action-adventure
- Mode: Single-player

The Elder Scrolls Adventures: Redguard is a 1998 action-adventure video game developed and published by Bethesda Softworks. It is unique in The Elder Scrolls series as the only game with a predetermined character and forced third-person point of view.

The story is set on the island of Stros M'Kai, an island off the coast of Hammerfell in Tamriel, in the final years of the Second Era, between the events of The Elder Scrolls Online and Arena. Cyrus, a young Redguard, arrives on the island in order to find his missing sister, Iszara, and subsequently finds himself in the middle of political intrigue.

== Gameplay ==
Redguard is a free-roaming action-adventure game played from a third-person perspective. It also features a protagonist with a set name, race and set of skills, whereas the other games in the series allow the player to customize all of these elements.

== Plot ==
Redguard's storyline takes place amid the Tiber Wars, shortly after Tiber Septim's Third Empire conquered and occupied Hammerfell. The death of Hammerfell's king had sparked a civil war between its competing political factions, the Crowns and the Forebears, the former led by the king's son, Prince A'tor. Septim sided with the Forebears and pushed the Crowns back to Stros M'Kai, where his best admiral, Lord Richton, and the mercenary dragon Nafaalilargus crushed Prince A'tor's remaining forces at the Battle of Hunding Bay. Richton's Dark Elf assassin Dram shot A'tor with a poisoned arrow, and despite the wizard Voa's attempts to save the prince, he seemingly did not survive. In the months that followed, Richton was named provisional governor of Stros M'Kai, a position he has held ruthlessly at the expense of the island's residents.

Cyrus is a mercenary under the employ of the Khajiit crime boss S'rathra. In Sentinel, he receives a letter from his old mentor and friend, Tobias. Tobias urges Cyrus to come to Stros M'Kai, where his sister has gone missing. Cyrus travels by ship, but as he nears the island, a group of Restless League pirates raids the ship. He dispatches them without trouble and the ship docks at the harbor. At the Draggin' Tale inn, Tobias fills Cyrus in on further details.

Hoping to gain an audience with Lord Richton, Cyrus takes a courier job which involves journeying to the Sload necromancer N'Gasta's fortified isle and delivering an amulet of his to Richton. The delivery is an opportunity for him to interrogate the governor, but he oversteps and is condemned to summary execution. Richton, impressed by the swift defeat of his guards, decides to imprison Cyrus in the palace's catacombs instead. There, Cyrus meets a dying Restless League member who gives him a key to the Saintsport lighthouse. He escapes the catacombs and learns how to signal the League at the lighthouse. Their ship arrives and takes him to their pirate cove hideout. Cyrus discovers that Iszara was prince A'tor's lover and a member of the Restless League, and that A'tor did not die but had his soul trapped in a soul gem, the very same amulet Cyrus had delivered to Richton. Iszara's plan had been to restore A'tor to life, but the League's caution made her steal the soul gem and take matters into her own hands.

Cyrus locates the legendary Flask of Lillandril, which he is told can be used to counter N'Gasta's magic spells. He returns to N'Gasta's tower in the hopes of finding Iszara there. The necromancer reveals how he tricked her and sent her soul to Clavicus Vile. Cyrus defeats N'Gasta using the flask then performs a ritual to enter Vile's realm, where he confronts the Daedric Prince. Vile relinquishes Iszara's soul after Cyrus wagers his own soul that he can solve a riddle. Iszara's soul restored, she accompanies Cyrus back to the League hideout. Cyrus succeeds at traversing the palace treasure vaults and slaying the dragon Nafaalilargus, who was tasked with guarding the soul gem.

In addition to the soul gem itself, Cyrus found Voa's ring within the island's underground goblin-infested caverns. He also helped a Yokudan wise woman, Saban, guide her son's soul past N'Gasta's soul snare to an afterlife in the Far Shores. This required fixing and studying the island's Dwarven orrery with a gear he found in the nearby ruins. With the soul gem, ring, and Saban to perform the ritual, Cyrus, Iszara, and the Restless League sneak into the local temple where A'tor's body is hidden. The ritual fails, however, placing A'tor's soul in his sword. Cyrus wields the "soul sword" and rallies his disheartened compatriots into a final attack on the harbor while he enters the palace to kill Richton. In the chaos of the attack, Richton and Dram prepare to flee the island in a Dwarven airship. Cyrus manages to board it as it launches. He duels Richton, who feigns surrender so that Dram can finish Cyrus off. Prince A'tor's spirit takes command of the soul sword to deliver fatal blows to Richton and Dram. With the governor defeated, Iszara assumes leadership of Stros M'Kai, begins rebuilding, and negotiates favorable treaties for Hammerfell with Tiber Septim and the Forebears as Cyrus leaves to explore Tamriel again.

== Development and release ==
The game was in development for two and a half years. Redguard was the second of the three titles to be released, on November 14, 1998. With the inspiration of Tomb Raider, Prince of Persia, and the Ultima series, Bethesda was to create a new series of pure action-adventure games under The Elder Scrolls Adventures label. Players would talk to NPCs through keywords, use items to solve puzzles, and follow an "epic" storyline, while moving through dungeons, sword fights and chasms. Bethesda Softworks subsidiary XL Translab worked with the Redguard team to create over thirty minutes of animation for the game.

With Redguard, the team focused its art time on achieving great detail in one particular area with the XnGine, creating the real-time 3D environments of the island and town of Stros M'Kai. Redguard did not offer the player the chance to create their own character. Instead, players would play the prefabricated "Cyrus the Redguard".

Redguard runs in MS-DOS through the XnGine engine, but the CD-ROM shipped with the Windows-only InstallShield installation program, and features a software renderer as well as a hardware accelerated Glide renderer. The game's manual also included a section called the Pocket Guide to the Empire, in which details were given on all the provinces of the Empire during that Era. This guide is written from the point of view of an Imperial, and has several handwritten notices in it written by an anti-imperial. Lastly, in some distributions of the game, the map that was provided in the box was partially burnt to provide an additional level of verisimilitude.

Early copies of Redguard also shipped with a comic book depicting the events that led up to Cyrus' adventure on Stros M'Kai. The comic is available for free download, via the official website.

== Reception ==
Reception

Aggregate score
Aggregator	Score
GameRankings	78%

Review scores
Publication	Score
Adventure Gamers	4/5
AllGame	4/5
CNET Gamecenter	7/10
Computer Gaming World	4/5
GameSpot	8.1/10
IGN	7/10
Next Generation	4/5
PC Accelerator	7/10
PC Gamer (UK)	63%
PC Gamer (US)	88%

Awards
Publication	Award
Computer Gaming World	Best Adventure (nominated)
PC Gamer US	The Best Adventure Game (nominated)
GameSpot	Adventure Game of the Year (nominated)

Like its predecessor An Elder Scrolls Legend: Battlespire, Redguard was a commercial flop. In retrospect, Todd Howard summarized that Redguard "didn't do well for the company", which contributed to Bethesda's financial downward spiral between 1996 and 2000.

The game received favorable reviews according to the review aggregation website GameRankings. Next Generation said that "Even with the faults [...] Redguard is an impressive addition to the Elder Scrolls series and deserves any true adventure fan's attention."

The game was a finalist for Computer Gaming World's 1998 "Best Adventure" award, but lost it to Grim Fandango and Sanitarium (tie). Likewise, GameSpot and PC Gamer US nominated the game as the year's best adventure title, but ultimately gave the distinction to Grim Fandango. The staff of the latter publication wrote, "While it has a lot of action-style gameplay that may turn off the stodgier adventure fans, Redguard delivers the genre's staples of exploration and puzzle solving in a fresh and entertaining way."
