= The Terminator 2029 =

1992 video game

- Developer: Bethesda Softworks
- Publisher: Bethesda Softworks
- Producer: V. J. Lakshman
- Programmer: Julian LeFay
- Composer: Julian LeFay
- Series: Terminator
- Platform: DOS
- Release: 1992
- Genre: Action-adventure
- Mode: Single player

The Terminator 2029 is a first-person shooter video game developed and published by Bethesda Softworks. It is based on the Terminator film series, and was released in 1992 for DOS. It is Bethesda's second Terminator game following The Terminator (1991).

== Gameplay ==
Terminator in battle

Encased in ACE Battle Armor, the player enters a ruined Los Angeles in 2029, a city reduced to rubble and burned remains after the nuclear strikes of 1997. Rebel Command assigns missions through detailed briefings from John Connor's team, outlining objectives, recommended weapons, and the enemies expected in the field. After receiving the briefing, the player visits the armory to equip gear before being deployed into hostile territory. Because Terminators and other threats are pervasive, the game provides a dedicated training arena that recreates real combat scenarios; here, the player can practice without permanent consequences, refine combat skills, and learn to operate the armor effectively before attempting actual missions where survival and preservation of the suit are critical.

== Development ==
The game had used a new concept which was first-person POV down the barrel of a gun. Weaver said the developers at id Software took Bethesda's idea and did it better.

== Deluxe CD Edition ==
The Deluxe CD Edition, released in 1994, includes the original game along with the 1993 expansion pack Operation Scour, giving a total of 34 missions. This edition also includes 330MB of additional mission briefings and character speech, as well as new gameplay music.

== Reception ==
Reception

Review scores
Publication	Score
Computer and Video Games	84/100
Just Games Retro	2/5
Pelit	88/100
Power Play	73/100
PC Joker	59/100

Gordon Goble of Computer Gaming World said "Those who are able to win the game in the optimal seven mission path may not become as sated as this reviewer, but I would have liked to see this product serve as more than a shoot-'em-up. The fact is that Terminator 2029 shines graphically, features an interesting premise, and supplies ample audible realism and thunder. It runs as a good computer game should, bereft of any annoying mid-play screen freezes". Finnish magazine Pelit wrote "Terminator 2029 would have had the makings of a real mega-game, but without W3D graphics, plenty of sound mats, and smart fellow soldiers, it's an absolutely grueling package that must be played to a conclusion. There is no greater shortage in the game, the top game is missed because every aspect could still have been improved".

In 1996, T. Liam McDonald of PC Gamer called it a "frustrating, often impossibly difficult game" with a confusing mouse and keyboard control interface.

Just Games Retro wrote in 2004 that the game "ends up being a mostly average shooter. It's a faithful and suitable use of the license, but it's really quite boring most of the time. Some simple design changes could have probably fixed this – giving you health or ammo from some destroyed enemies, for starters, or points received from killing baddies that you can spend on weapon upgrades, instead of getting new ones automatically for each mission. The enemy pop-in seems to be partially design, and partially technical limitations, but the game would probably benefit from something a little more predictable, or not so overtly random that enemies teleport from nowhere. This game isn't terrible, but Future Shock is a much better realization of what Bethesda was trying to do here".

=== Operation Scour ===
Reception

Review score
Publication	Score
Pelit	79/100

Tapio Salminen from Pelit reviewed the Operation Scour expansion pack stating that "Overall, the new additional disc is disappointing as it offers far too little new to be really interesting. Old Bugs remain uncorrected, and the base game is not replenished, let alone updated. Operation Scour is an additional feature for those who like the original game. Let the others not bother".

== Sales ==
According to Bethesda founder Christopher Weaver, the game had good sales but not great. The game was regarded by Weaver in 1997 as one of the most popular Bethesda titles along with Wayne Gretzky Hockey 3 and the Elder Scrolls series. Ted Peterson, one of the original creators of the Elder Scrolls series, stated in 2021 that the game was a moderate success for the company.
