= XnGine =

Game engine

- Developer: Bethesda Softworks
- Initial release: 1995
- License: Proprietary

XnGine (or X-ngine) is a DOS based 3D engine developed by Bethesda Softworks. Bethesda used the engine for several games released between 1995 and 1999.

== History and features ==
XnGine was developed by Bethesda Softworks in 1995. Bethesda has invested over $3 million and nine man-years in continued development of the engine. The Terminator: Future Shock was the first game to use the engine, and also the first 3D PC game to use the now popular mouse-look interface, which was initially unpopular with gamers.

XnGine incorporated technology advances that made games more realistic. The engine featured quicker action, unrestricted viewing angles and freedom of movement. Its proprietary technology integrates 360-degree rotation with fully textured polygons, SVGA/VGA graphics and specialized video effects. XnGine can generate weather effects, such as snow, sleet and fog; realistic shading; and textured, contoured terrain. In an Interview with PCM&E Magazine in 1996, Todd Howard described the engine as a true 3D engine that delivered above any other engine in its lighting in that it uses real-time phong shading, which means that light effects from fires, explosions, the moon, or whatever will bleed off and light up anything the light will touch.

With The Elder Scrolls Adventures: Redguard, support was implemented for 3D graphics cards equipped with 3dfx graphics processors. Competing technologies from Matrox and Nvidia were not supported.

== Reception ==
With the release of Battlespire, GameSpot wrote the following regarding the engine:

XnGine vividly demonstrates some of its traditional weaknesses. Being DOS-based, the XnGine suffers from stability problems within Windows 95, infrequently crashing for no apparent reason (even when using DOS window memory settings suggested by Bethesda). Battlespire's version of the XnGine has a real problem with "clipping" errors, which cause players and creatures to get hopelessly stuck in walls or the numerous 3D polygonal objects littering Battlespire's levels.

== Games using XnGine ==
Year	Title	Platform(s)	Ref.
1995	The Terminator: Future Shock	MS-DOS	
1996	Skynet	MS-DOS	
1996	The Elder Scrolls II: Daggerfall	MS-DOS	
1997	XCar: Experimental Racing	MS-DOS	
1997	An Elder Scrolls Legend: Battlespire	MS-DOS	
1998	Burnout: Championship Drag Racing	MS-DOS	
1998	The Elder Scrolls Adventures: Redguard	MS-DOS	
1999	NIRA Intense Import Drag Racing	MS-DOS	

=== Canceled ===
The 10th Planet
