= An Elder Scrolls Legend: Battlespire =

1997 video game

- North American cover art
- Developer: Bethesda Softworks
- Publisher: Bethesda Softworks
- Director: Julian LeFay
- Producer: Christopher Weaver
- Designers: Ken Rolston; Julian LeFay; Richard Guy; Dan Greenberg
- Programmers: Julian LeFay; Marvin Herbold; Julian LeFay, Marvin Herbold
- Artists: Richard Guy; Mark Jones; Gary Noonan; Louise Sandoval
- Series: The Elder Scrolls
- Engine: XnGine
- Platform: MS-DOS
- Release: 4 December 1997
- Genre: Action role-playing
- Modes: Single-player, multiplayer

An Elder Scrolls Legend: Battlespire is a 1997 role-playing video game developed and published by Bethesda Softworks for MS-DOS. Set in the universe of The Elder Scrolls franchise, players navigate the titular Battlespire and planes of Oblivion to find and defeat Mehrunes Dagon, before his armies invade the world of Tamriel. Following the release of Daggerfall in 1996, Battlespire was first conceived as an expansion pack to the game, and adapted into a spin-off title set in The Elder Scrolls universe, alongside The Elder Scrolls Adventures: Redguard. Led by Elder Scrolls developer Julian Le Fay, it was designed with a smaller scope and linear level design. The game featured several novel mechanics not seen in previous titles, including the addition of a multiplayer mode.

Upon release, Battlespire received mixed reviews, with critics divided on the merits of the game's visuals, gameplay, and smaller scope, and critiquing the high level of software bugs. Critics retrospectively assessed the game as an unsuccessful spin-off in the series, and its developers viewed that the game's commercial and critical failure, alongside Redguard, had led to a period of decline for Bethesda Softworks not recovered until the development and release of The Elder Scrolls III: Morrowind.

== Gameplay ==
Battlespire is played in a 3D world, although characters are displayed in 2.5D.

Battlespire is an action-adventure video game in which the objective is to progress through a series of seven levels by defeating enemies, solving puzzles and collecting objects. In contrast to its series predecessors such as The Elder Scrolls II: Daggerfall, Battlespire is a linear game set in a dungeon. Players navigate through the world from a fixed first-person perspective, and pressing the enter key allows players to look around freely in their current position. The arrow keys are used to move, and players use the mouse and point-and-click control to look around and interact. The function keys can be customised as hotkeys for various actions, including use of inventory items or casting spells. Players create a character at the start of the game, altering their appearance from one of six races and selecting one of eighteen classes, or manually creating a custom build by spending a limited amount of points to adjust the character's hit points, skills and attributes, starting magic spells and equipment.

Combat consists of clicking and dragging the mouse button to swing weapons in one of four directions. A primary and secondary weapon can be equipped and changed by pressing a key. Magic spells are obtained at character creation or acquired from scrolls found in libraries, and can be customised by type, area of effect and range, and assigned to a hotkey. Skills can be incremented by using them throughout the game. When a level is completed, players earn experience points that can be used to increase skills and attributes. Players can interact with characters using a dialog box with responses chosen from a dialog tree.

Battlespire supports multiplayer using a local area network or via the Internet using Mplayer.com. In 'Co-operative Scenario', up to eight players can complete the campaign co-operatively one level at a time, with additional monsters in each level. 'Team vs. Team' tasks players to complete levels in one of two groups with a maximum of four players, with the first team to complete the level winning. In these modes, players cannot save the game during the level or enter dialog with non-player characters. Competitive multiplayer modes include 'Deathmatch ', which involves player versus player combat for up to eight players set in the game levels.

== Plot ==
On the edge of the realm of Oblivion, a pocket universe enhanced by magic, is a floating fortress named the Battlespire. The Emperor of Tamriel, a continent on the planet of Nirn, created the Battlespire in this alternate dimension as a training base and college to train aspiring elite Imperial Battlemages who act as his bodyguards. As one of these Battlemages, players are sent to the Battlespire, whose trainers, the Preceptors, have been killed by Daedric monsters under the command of the Prince Mehrunes Dagon. They must investigate what has caused the Daedra to overrun the Battlespire and save it from destruction by following them through a number of other settings throughout Oblivion. They are guided by the notes and messages of another adventurer, who ascended the Battlespire before players.

Upon entering the Battlespire, players are trapped inside and cannot return. Upon investigation, they learn a servant of Mehrunes Dagon corrupted a mage in the Battlespire to betray the Empire and let the Daedra inside. The Daedric army is revealed to be assembling in other realms and plan to use the Battlespire to launch an invasion of the world of Tamriel. Players follow the path of the Daedra as they open corridors through the realms, including the Soul Cairn, Shade Perilous, Chimera of Desolation and Havoc Wellhead. They meet lovers Jaciel Morgen and Deyanira Katrece, who have been attacked by the passing army. Deyanira sacrifices herself to assist the player's progress, and Morgen vows to help them defeat Mehrunes Dagon. After defeating Dagon's bodyguards, players call on Jaciel to distract him for long enough to kill him and cast him into an empty void of Oblivion. Having defeated Dagon, players free his captives and return to Tamriel to receive the praise of the Emperor in liberating the Battlespire.

== Development and release ==
Following release of The Elder Scrolls II: Daggerfall in 1996, developer Bethesda Softworks simultaneously prepared three projects to capitalise on the success of the game. Battlespire was first planned by Bethesda Softworks as an expansion pack for the game as Dungeon of Daggerfall, but instead, the studio decided to simultaneously produce several spin-off titles set in The Elder Scrolls universe — Battlespire and The Elder Scrolls Adventures: Redguard — announced at E3 1997. The spin-offs aimed to present further stories and worldbuilding set in The Elder Scrolls setting of Tamriel, and fill the gap between development on the planned release of a sequel to Daggerfall, The Elder Scrolls III: Morrowind, which had been delayed to allow more time for development and accommodate the release of the side projects. Intended as simpler, more action-focused counterparts to the main series, the games reflected feedback from players of previous The Elder Scrolls titles that the scope of Daggerfall had been too large.

Development of Battlespire was directed by lead programmer Julian LeFay, who had worked as a lead on previous Elder Scrolls titles. The game was made using Bethesda's proprietary game engine named XnGine used in Daggerfall, upgrading its graphics to the Super VGA standard. Le Fay stated that whilst the game was broadly based on mechanics in Daggerfall, it presented an opportunity to "try a few new things", including modifications to the combat system, dialog and artificial intelligence of enemies. The developers opted to use two-dimensional billboard sprites for non-player characters and enemies instead of 3D, to provide a higher level of detail and allow the team more time to optimisation and other features. The relocation of additional staff from Morrowind to the project allowed for development of a narrative and characters that were not originally intended to feature in the game. 3D animation cutscenes were created by XL Translab.

Battlespire was shipped on 4 December 1997. In 2022, Bethesda re-released Battlespire on Steam and the Xbox Game Pass alongside other Elder Scrolls titles.

== Reception ==
=== Critical reviews ===
Reception

Review scores
Publication	Score
AllGame	3/5
Computer Gaming World	2/5
Computer and Video Games	4/5
GamePro	C+
GameSpot	6.7/10
Hyper	47%
Next Generation	3/5
PC Gamer (UK)	49%
PC Gamer (US)	58%
PC PowerPlay	54%
PC Zone	75%
Boot	5/10
Ultimate PC	86% / 51%

Battlespire received average reviews upon release. Critics were divided on the impact of the game's reduced scope: Next Generation felt that this provided greater focus and less "aimless wandering", however others were disappointed that it lacked the scope and depth of its predecessor's role-playing mechanics. Some critics compared the game's design to the Ultima series of titles.

The visual presentation of Battlespire was faulted, with some finding the XnGine and its graphics dated, and PC Zone wrote they were well below the standards of a game of its type. Critics were divided on its sprites, whilst some found them well-executed, others felt they lacked detail when viewed up close. Describing the graphics as "low-tech", the UK version of PC Gamer described the game's textures as "blocky and drab" and the animation as "shockingly bad" due to their limited detail. Many critics were also unimpressed by the 3D visuals due to the fact that they did not support 3D acceleration as initially promised by the developer.

Reviewers were divided on the gameplay of Battlespire. Whilst Computer & Video Games found it "deeply rewarding and entertaining", other critics found it difficult, citing a lack of ability for players to recover energy and spell points without potions. Writing that gameplay was "tedious" and "exceptionally tough", Computer Gaming World felt it had uncreative gameplay objectives and lacked incentive for players to defeat enemies as it did not have traditional character development. Character design and gameplay mechanics received a generally positive reception: PC Gamer enjoyed the "thorough and highly customisable" character system and user interface, and Boot felt the character generation was also "exquisitely crafted and detailed", but its detail was "out of place" compared to the rest of the game.

The story and writing of Battlespire were generally praised, particularly its dialog. GameSpot praised the game's dialog conversations with characters as a "welcome surprise" and "plentiful, generally well voice-acted and universally well written". GamePro enjoyed that dialog choices could present a "practical alternative to fighting", but found it could be repetitive and overly comedic. However, Ultimate PC found the premise "naff and typical of fantasy genre titles". The multiplayer mode received a mixed reception, with some finding it laggy. GameSpot faulted its lack of modem-to-modem support, and that the multiplayer campaign's omission of dialog and saving limited its viability.

Many critics faulted Battlespire for its bugs, with PC Gamer stating they were "too obvious and numerous to be excusable". Reviewers reported compatibility issues, sluggish frame rates, collision issues, pathfinding problems with non-player characters, and crashes. Reviewing a patched version of the game in 1998, PC PowerPlay stated that upon release, the game was "roundly criticised, by gamers and reviewers alike for being a buggy, almost unplayable mess", and observed that occasional crashes and compatibility issues persisted.

=== Retrospective reception ===
Retrospective reception of Battlespire has been negative, with several assessments characterising it and Redguard as unsuccessful and obscure spin-offs, and describing the game as the worst title in the Elder Scrolls series. Several noted the game's removal of key design elements that were selling points of the Elder Scrolls franchise, including a narrative, open-ended world and character customisation. However, several critics remarked that the game's online capabilities were ahead of their time. Repeatedly describing Battlespire as the worst of the Elder Scrolls series, PC Gamer faulted the game's "brutal" difficulty, lack of towns, and "awful" writing, considering its "clunky" combat ill-suited to a linear dungeon-crawling game. Computer Games Magazine retrospectively critiqued the game for contributing to the "shaky heritage" of the Elder Scrolls series prior to the release of Morrowind, faulting its bugs, dated engine, and control scheme.

== Legacy ==
Several Bethesda staff reflected that co-development of Battlespire and Redguard was strained and their unsuccessful release led to a period of contraction for the studio. Both executive producer Christopher Weaver and LeFay considered that the studio overextended their resources to produce these titles, and as a result experienced attrition of several employees, including LeFay. Studio director Todd Howard stated that Battlespire and Redguard did not benefit the company, and were "close to going out of business" by the time of the company's acquisition by ZeniMax Media in 1999. Whilst the developers could not identify what elements, if any, made their way into future Elder Scrolls titles, Weaver stated the games gave the studio time to test gameplay ideas and provide opportunities to further plan and develop Morrowind.
