= AMF Bowling World Lanes =

2008 video game

- Developer(s): Frontline Studios
- Publisher(s): Vir2L Studios
- Platform(s): Wii
- Release: NA: November 18, 2008
- Genre(s): Sports
- Mode(s): Single-player

AMF Bowling World Lanes is a sports video game developed by American company Frontline Studios and published by Bethesda Softworks on November 18, 2008, for the Wii video game console. It is the second AMF Bowling game on the Wii after AMF Bowling Pinbusters!

== Gameplay ==
In AMF Bowling World Lanes, the player uses the Wii Remote to bowl bowling balls in games played against the AI. When preparing to bowl a ball, the player can choose to throw the ball several seconds after their character has walked up to the line during their approach. The game comes with several characters that players can use and locations where players can bowl. There is also a guy called George with a long beard who you can play as only after bowling 3 perfect games. Characters include a Scottish person that wears a kilt who bowls with his plaid ball and a Brazilian soccer player who bowls with a black and white ball. AMF Bowling World Lanes also contains several bowling mini-games.

== Development ==
The game was announced in April 2008.

== Reception ==
Reception

Review scores
Publication	Score
GameZone	5.5/10
IGN	2.5/10

The game received an aggregated score of 25% at Metacritic. AMF Bowling World Lanes was given a score of 2.5 of 10 from video game critic website IGN. Their review criticized the graphics, asking "if you're going to sell a bowling game, put some effort into making it close to Wii Bowling. Please," and calling the graphics for the characters and locations "flat out bad". They were also disappointed with what they considered character one-liners that emphasized unnecessary stereotypes, along with poor controls which they believed made the game more difficult to control. IGN compared AMF Bowling World Lanes to the bowling component of Wii Sports several times, noting, "it's still not anywhere close to the quality of Wii Sports Bowling, a free game included with every Wii system in North America."
