= AMF Bowling 2004 =

2003 video game

- Developer(s): Black Market Games
- Publisher(s): Mud Duck Productions
- Series: AMF Bowling
- Platform(s): Xbox
- Release: NA: December 1, 2003
- Genre(s): Bowling
- Mode(s): Single-player, multiplayer

AMF Bowling 2004 is a video game developed by Black Market Games and published by Mud Duck Productions exclusively for the Xbox in the US on December 1, 2003. Licensed by AMF Bowling, the game is a simulation of traditional ten-pin bowling, with modes for individual and local multiplayer and tournament play. AMF Bowling received negative reviews, with critics citing its lack of gameplay features and variety and sub-par presentation of the game's character models and environment design. The game was the first in a series of licensed bowling games published by Mud Duck Productions, succeeded by AMF Bowling Pinbusters! for the Nintendo Wii and DS in 2007.

== Gameplay ==
A screenshot of gameplay in AMF Bowling 2004.

AMF Bowling 2004 is a simulation of ten-pin bowling over ten frames. Players control the ball using a circular overlay with three regions and a pointer arrow. The player presses the A button four times to start the bowl, determine the power of the bowl, the accuracy of the bowl, and the level of spin. Lanes feature other mechanics, including an oil pattern that determines the level of grip on a lane, influencing how much spin can be applied to a bowl. The game supports a scoreboard and replay controls to view a completed bowl. Players are also able to create and modify the appearance of their own bowler and change the texture, logo, surface and hook of their ball.

AMF Bowling 2004 supports two modes. In 'Open Bowling' mode, players can complete a regular local game with up to three human or computer opponents, a team game in groups of competitors, or a practice mode in which pins can be removed during frames. In 'Tournament' mode, players compete in rounds against 8, 16, or 32 competitors, either in a match play mode with bowlers eliminated in head-to-head rounds, or a shootout mode where players where eliminations are decided in groups of three, with the top two players facing off to determine the winner.

== Reception ==
Reception

Aggregate score
| Aggregator | Score |
|---|---|
| Metacritic | 48/100 |

Review scores
| Publication | Score |
|---|---|
| GameSpot | 5.2/10 |
| IGN | 5/10 |
| TeamXbox | 3/10 |
| Xbox Nation (XBN) | 6/10 |

AMF Bowling 2004 received a negative reception from critics. Review aggregator Metacritic stating the game received "generally unfavorable reviews" with an average score of 48% across six reviews. Critics were mixed on the merits of the bowling gameplay. Hilary Goldstein of IGN praised the physics as "good as they can get in a bowling game", but found the core gameplay "bare bones" and "boring". Similarly, Alex Navarro of GameSpot praised the game's "realistic delivery", but found the game "isn't much fun" due to the game's "complete and utter lack of variety...with no rule variations", also critiquing the game's poor explanation of mechanics, stating "oil patterns and aiming marks may be true to life, but they aren't exactly intuitive...the game never really explains how these elements come into play." However, Russ Garbutt of Xbox Nation found the game to be "fun", stating "the ball, pin and lane physics are as spot-on as the developers claim they are." Dale Nardozzi of Team Xbox stated the game was "stripped down" and "fails on pretty much every gameplay level", finding the lack of options led to a "purely score-based game" with no unlockable features or motivation to play.

Several critics dismissed the visual presentation and sparse design of the game. Writing for IGN, Hilary Goldstein critiqued the game as having "no frills, weak animations, terrible character models, and a lack of visual pop". Similarly, Alex Navarro of GameSpot stated the game's "graphics and sound leave quite a lot to be desired", dismissing the bowler models as "a complete joke, with badly shaped bodies and no real detail to speak of", and finding the "remaining set pieces and components (to be) pretty low-res and generally not nice to look at". Russ Garbutt of Xbox Nation stated "the title does very little to impress...the flashy balls and pins are artistically rendered, but these are last-generation graphics." Dale Nardozzi of Team Xbox dismissed the graphics as a "full-frontal insult", disliking the "poor animations", "sheer lack of detail", and "terrible" surrounding details.
