= Gridiron! =

1986 video game

- Developer: Bethesda Softworks
- Publishers: Bethesda Softworks (Amiga), Electronic Arts (Atari ST)
- Designer: Ed Fletcher
- Platforms: Amiga, Atari ST
- Release: 1986
- Genre: Sports

Gridiron! is a 1986 sports video game developed by Bethesda Softworks and published by Electronic Arts. The game was the first title of the Maryland studio, founded by MIT graduate Christopher Weaver and lead programmer Ed Fletcher, who aimed to create a more realistic sports simulation game.

== Gameplay ==
The player can input commands to determine the play the football players will execute. The football field is viewed from an overhead perspective and displays the football players as colored dots.

Gridiron! is a sports game in which one or two players act as the coach for an American football team, calling plays to direct the football players. The football field is viewed from a top-down perspective and the football players are represented on the field by colored dots. The statistics for players are provided on an NFL DataDisc.

== Development and release ==
Gridiron! was developed by Bethesda Softworks, a Maryland-based studio founded by Christopher Weaver in 1986. Weaver created the game with lead programmer Ed Fletcher—a colleague from Weaver's consulting company Media Technology—who suggested entering the video game market. A football game was chosen as an initial project due to Fletcher's knowledge and interest in the game. Weaver lacked knowledge of the sport but had experience with physics and display interaction as a MIT science graduate. Production was "extremely frugal" according to Weaver, with development taking place from his home in Bethesda. Developing the tools and physics engine from scratch, the pair aimed to address the limitations of contemporary sports games' capabilities to simulate reality.

Electronic Arts entered an agreement with Bethesda Softworks to further market and distribute Gridiron! in return for developing a licensed John Madden football title, a game that the publisher had been developing since 1984. In 1988, Bethesda Softworks filed a $7.3 million lawsuit against the publisher on the claim that they had ceased release of Gridiron! to integrate major portions of the game into the Madden title. The case settled out of court for an undisclosed sum. Weaver retrospectively named this one of the "worst" decisions made in his company, considering Bethesda Softworks' contributions to its engine and technology to have "heavily influenced" its success. John Madden Football was later published by Electronic Arts in 1988.

== Reception ==
Reception

Review scores
| Publication | Score |
|---|---|
| Atari Explorer | 8/10 |
| Amiga Computing | 78% |
| Amiga Joker | 72% |

Gridiron! received generally positive reviews from critics. Writing for Computer Gaming World, Wyatt Lee wrote that the game's custom playbooks and teams provided the potential for "tremendous constructability" and the "statistics critical" design was not often observed in football simulation games. John Harrington of Games International considered the game to be an impressive mixture of strategy and arcade play. Atari Explorer's Andy Eddy found the Atari title to be challenging and enjoyable with a "strategically accurate" design, commenting that while the minimal graphics assisted with seeing how formations and plays evolve, the graphics were not of a high standard. Ervin Bobo of Compute! noted the game's customisation abilities presented "options never before seen" in a football simulation, finding the simplified graphics was "no handicap" to the gameplay. Amiga World Magazine reviewer Bob Ryan commended the title as an "excellent physical simulation" and the "best game" played on the Amiga, although acknowledging the "simple but not crude" graphics. Uwe Rönitz for Amiga Joker considered the Amiga version to be appealing and playable, although noting the game took time to get used to with the difficulty "high demands" on the user. However, Torsten Blum for Aktueller Software Markt dismissed the Amiga version of the game as a "failed sports-strategy hybrid" and "lousy simulator", citing the lack of game options, the "spartan" graphics and "monotonous" gameplay.

The game sold well and was voted as one of the 40 Best Games of All Time by Amiga World. Weaver later said in 1994 that Gridiron! "put Bethesda on the map," and in 1995 Weaver said that the game was the best-selling sports game ever published for Atari ST and Amiga. By 1989, the game sold nearly 20,000 units.

Several critics have retrospectively praised Gridiron for its technical innovation and subsequent influence upon the Madden Football series. Rick Maese of The Washington Post described the game as "unremarkable for its stone-age graphics but ahead of its time for the physics and coding that laid the technical groundwork for sports titles to follow". Tyler Wilde of PC Gamer described the simulation mechanics as an "unheard of feat" for its time. Luke Plunkett of Kotaku similarly noted the game's simulation mechanics were "unheard of" and the first time "true physics" were integrated into sports gaming, whilst assessing the visuals as "ugly" even by the standards of the time.
