= Skynet (video game) =

1996 first-person shooter game

- European cover art
- Developers: Bethesda Softworks; MediaTech West
- Publisher: Bethesda Softworks
- Director: Morten Mørup
- Producer: Todd Howard
- Designers: Todd Howard; Morten Mørup; John Pearson
- Composer: Andy Warr
- Engine: XnGine
- Platform: MS-DOS
- Release: November 20, 1996
- Genre: First-person shooter
- Modes: Single-player, multiplayer

Skynet (known in Europe as The Terminator: Skynet − stylized as SkyNET) is a 1996 first-person shooter video game developed by Bethesda Softworks based on the Terminator franchise. It was intended as an expansion pack for the predecessor The Terminator: Future Shock, but was adapted into a standalone product.

It received mostly positive reviews, praising its advanced high-resolution graphics for the time, as well as the fact that Bethesda included a multiplayer mode in contrast of its predecessor.

== Gameplay ==
Skynet is played in the first-person perspective. Each of the eight levels in the game require the player to solve a number of objectives before continuing to the next level, while fighting enemy terminators with a wide variety of guns and grenades. Another obstacle in each level is the harsh terrain, as many areas contain too much radiation for the player character to remain alive. The terrain is navigated in three ways, 'on foot', in a jeep with a mounted cannon, or in an HK fighter (a modified terminator robot that flies). Before each mission, the player is briefed via a full-motion video cutscene.

Skynet features a deathmatch mode, which allows players to fight in a number of maps as either a human or a Terminator. Human players move quickly and silently, but are relatively fragile and can only carry lightweight weapons. Terminators, on the other hand, move slowly and make loud hydraulic noises when they walk, but are very resilient to damage and can carry heavy weapons. Players are able to change various options including time limits and the time of day.

== Development ==
Skynet was developed by Bethesda Softworks and MediaTech West and used Bethesda's XnGine. While the majority of the game uses textured polygons to display structures and enemies, many of the items, weapons, and level decorations are still shown using older sprite technology. The game went gold on November 11, 1996.

== Reception ==
Reception

Review scores
Publication	Score
CNET Gamecenter	8/10
Computer Games Strategy Plus	3/5
Computer Gaming World	2.5/5
GameRevolution	B+
Next Generation	5/5
PC PowerPlay	72% (PC)
PC Gamer	88%

A reviewer for Next Generation said the game fixed the problems with the "revolutionary" The Terminator: Future Shock by enabling "high resolution SVGA graphics", adding a multiplayer mode with maps designed specifically for deathmatch, and including an involved storyline. He concluded, "The sheer beauty of the game, combined with the incredible amount of flexibility of the engine, means Terminator: SkyNET could be the best first-person shooter of the new year." Scary Larry of GamePro found that the high resolution mode runs choppy even on high-end PCs, and had a more measured reaction to the game in general, concluding, "Although not as intense as Final Doom or as attitude-filled as Duke Nukem [3D], SkyNET will keep you blasting into the wee hours of the next apocalypse." He was most pleased with the mission objectives which involve riding vehicles and the intuitive, easy-to-remember controls.
