= The 10th Planet =

10th Planet
- Developers: Centropolis Entertainment; Bethesda Softworks
- Publisher: Bethesda Softworks
- Producer: Bruce Nesmith
- Programmer: Kaare Siesing
- Writers: Roland Emmerich, Dean Devlin
- Engine: XnGine
- Platform: Windows
- Release: Cancelled

The 10th Planet was a cancelled space combat game that was to be published by Bethesda Softworks.

== Overview ==
The 10th Planet was intended to be a 3D space combat strategy game where players defend the solar system from alien invaders. Gameplay would have emphasized tactical spaceship building to allow players to fine-tune their ships. Over 100 customizable ship components were planned, including engines, thrusters, shields, and weapons. The 10th Planet was set in the distant future where the Solar System had become a ravaged battlefield with armadas of starships. Using a previously unknown tenth planet orbiting the Solar System as a staging ground, an alien force planned to conquer Earth.

== Development and marketing ==
Development for The 10th Planet began in 1994 as a joint project between Centropolis Entertainment and Bethesda. However, Centropolis stopped work on the game due to its film commitments. The developers kept publicized information to a minimum. GamePro magazine staff described the shoot'em up gameplay as Star Fox meets X-Wing. While the game was intended to be released on home computers, PlayStation and Saturn versions were considered. According to Todd Howard, the game never made past pre-production. It was showcased at E3 1995. The developers aimed to release the game in 1996. This was pushed to October 1997 and later to 1998. XCar: Experimental Racing was advertised as a free bonus to those who pre-ordered the game.
