= Julian LeFay =

Danish programmer (1965–2025)

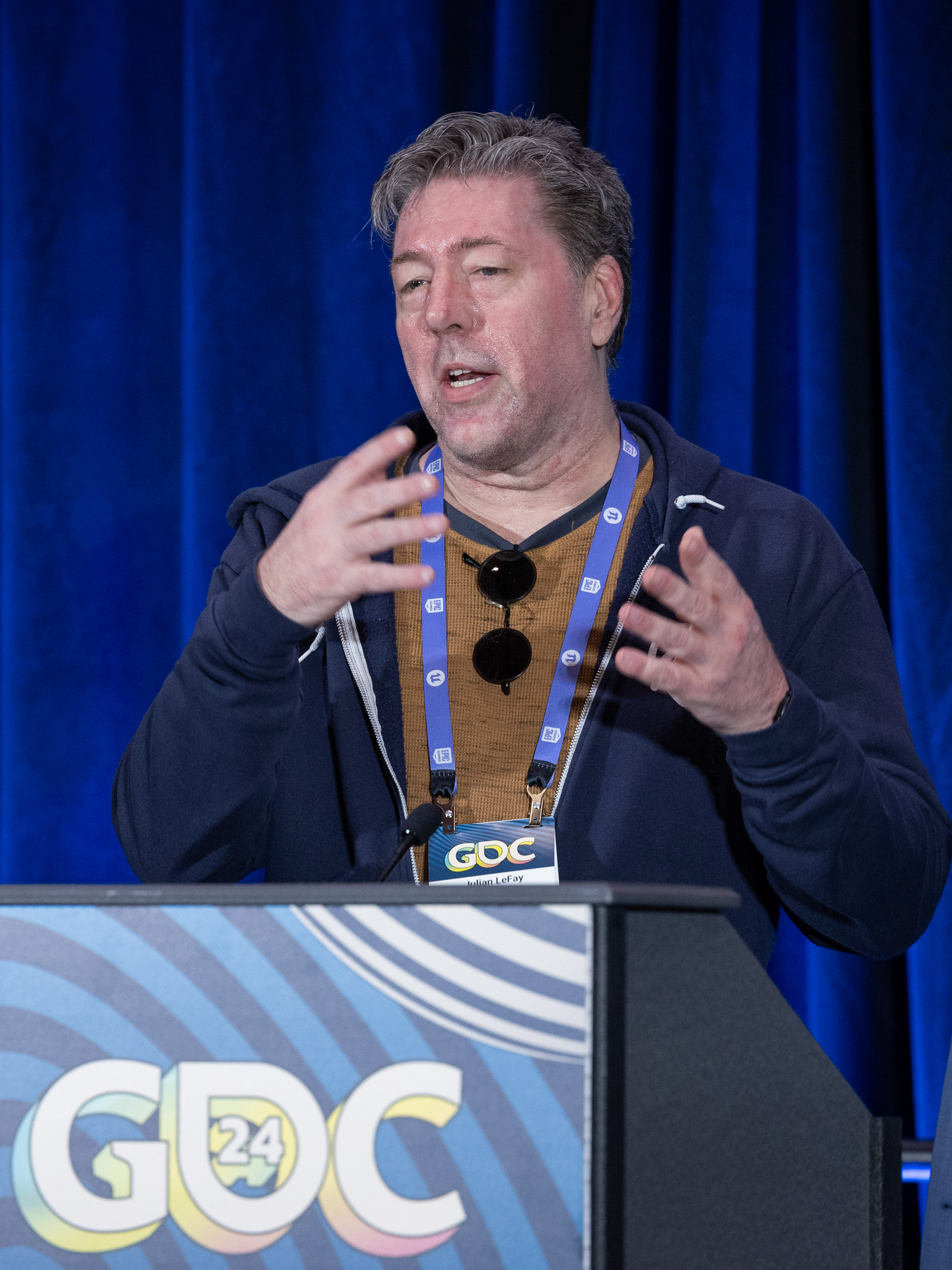
- LeFay in 2024
- Born: Benni Jensen; 30 October 1965; Denmark
- Died: 22 July 2025 (aged 59)
- Occupations: Programmer; game designer; musician
- Known for: The Elder Scrolls series

Julian LeFay (born Benni Jensen; 30 October 1965 – 22 July 2025) was a Danish programmer, video game designer and musician, best known for his work on The Elder Scrolls: Arena, The Elder Scrolls II: Daggerfall, and An Elder Scrolls Legend: Battlespire.

== Early life ==
LeFay was born Benni Jensen on 30 October 1965, in Denmark. Before he began programming, he played in the Danish electro-pop band Russia Heat.

== Career ==
Early in his career, LeFay worked on PC, Amiga and NES projects, performing programming tasks and composing music for games such as Where's Waldo? and Sword of Sodan.

Referred to as the "Father of The Elder Scrolls", LeFay joined Bethesda Softworks shortly after the company's creation in 1987. He held the role of Chief Engineer, and led the company through the creation of some of its seminal games, such as The Terminator 2029, Arena, Daggerfall and Battlespire. The Elder Scrolls deity Julianos is based on Julian. He worked briefly on The Elder Scrolls III: Morrowind as a contractor after quitting Bethesda in 1998. He also briefly worked at Sega, and was involved in the production of Skullgirls.

In 2019, LeFay co-founded the independent game studio OnceLost Games with former Bethesda developers Ted Peterson and Vijay Lakshman, and announced they would be working on a new open world role-playing game called The Wayward Realms, which would serve as a spiritual successor to Daggerfall. Although initially offered $8 million by a major publisher, the team rejected the offer as they believed they could not make the game for less than $12 million. The Wayward Realms was first unveiled in 2021. On 30 May 2024, OnceLost Games launched a Kickstarter campaign with a funding goal of $500,000 to support one year of development on an early access build, intended to be used in securing additional publisher support. The campaign was successfully funded.

In January 2021, LeFay became the chief technology officer of Licorice, where he was responsible for building the company's servers and technical infrastructure. He was previously the vice president of research and development at Blockbuster and worked on information retrieval and natural language parsing. While working at Blockbuster, LeFay learned Ancient Greek and developed a parser for the language.

== Personal life and death ==
On 17 July 2025, OnceLost Games announced that LeFay had cancer which had become terminal, causing him to step away from the company and development of The Wayward Realms. He died on 22 July 2025, at the age of 59.

Ted Peterson wrote that LeFay chose to "live his final moments surrounded by his loved ones," noting that "even during his illness, he continued to share his vision with our team, mentor our developers, and ensure that every aspect of the game reflected his commitment to creating something truly extraordinary." Todd Howard, executive producer for Bethesda, said that LeFay "was the driving force in the creation of The Elder Scrolls and the foundations of Bethesda as a game studio", stating that "simply put, without Julian, we would not be here today".

== Games ==
List of video games worked on by Julian LeFay
| Year | Title | Role(s) | Ref. |
|---|---|---|---|
| 1988 | Sword of Sodan | Music | |
| 1988 | Wayne Gretzky Hockey | Game design, coding, music | |
| 1989 | Dragon's Lair | Coding (DOS) | |
| 1991 | Where's Waldo? | Music | |
| 1991 | The Terminator | Designer | |
| 1992 | The Terminator 2029 | Chief programmer | |
| 1994 | The Elder Scrolls: Arena | Lead programmer | |
| 1996 | The Elder Scrolls II: Daggerfall | Project leader and programmer | |
| 1997 | An Elder Scrolls Legend: Battlespire | Lead programmer and designer | |
| 2002 | The Elder Scrolls III: Morrowind | Contractor | |
| TBA | The Wayward Realms | Technical producer | |
