= The Terminator: Future Shock =

1995 first-person shooter

- North American cover art with the T-800 Terminator cyborg.
- Developer: Bethesda Softworks
- Publisher: Bethesda Softworks
- Director: Kaare Siesing
- Producer: Todd Howard
- Designers: Robert Stoll; Ted Peterson
- Programmers: Kaare Siesing; Morten Mørup
- Writers: Robert Stoll; Ted Peterson
- Composer: Andy Warr
- Engine: XnGine
- Platform: MS-DOS
- Release: December 1995
- Genre: First-person shooter
- Mode: Single-player

The Terminator: Future Shock is a first-person shooter video game for MS-DOS developed by Bethesda Softworks and released in 1995. It is based on the Terminator franchise. The game received generally positive reviews, and a sequel, Skynet, was released in 1996.

== Gameplay ==
Players view the environment from a first-person perspective, using weapons to shoot enemies. Player health and other information are at the bottom.

Future Shock is a first-person shooter in which the player navigates 3D levels in a post-apocalyptic world while fighting enemy robots with a wide variety of guns and grenades. Each level requires the player to accomplish a number of objectives before progressing. Levels include harsh terrain, as many areas contain radiation that is lethal to the player character. The terrain is navigated in three ways: on foot, in a jeep with a mounted cannon, or in an aerial combat robot, referred to as an HK fighter.

Future Shock is single-player only. A multiplayer deathmatch mode was added to the sequel, Skynet.

== Plot ==
Set in a post-apocalyptic future, The Terminator: Future Shock begins in 2015 with the player character escaping from an extermination camp with the help of the Human Resistance. After escaping, the character is introduced to John Connor, the leader of the Human Resistance, as well as a young Kyle Reese and begins aiding the resistance effort with missions. After several missions, T-800 model Terminators infiltrate the Human Resistance headquarters, causing its leadership to establish a new headquarters elsewhere. The player character later witnesses enemies appearing out of nowhere, eventually learning that Skynet has perfected time displacement. As a result of the successful resistance missions, Skynet from the future begins manipulating time by strategically placing its forces to thwart successful resistance maneuvers. The Human Resistance learns that Skynet is using time displacement to transmit information to itself in 1995 in an attempt to increase the speed at which it will become sentient. The player character is sent on a mission to stop Skynet as the resistance HQ is besieged and Kyle Reese and Connor himself are seriously wounded.

== Development ==
Bethesda Softworks developed the game using its XnGine 3D graphics engine, which the company had invested over $3 million into developing. Todd Howard produced the title. The XnGine engine incorporated technology advances to portray more realism in games, such as quicker action, unrestricted viewing angles, and freedom of movement. Its proprietary technology integrates 360-degree rotation with fully textured polygons, SVGA/VGA graphics and specialized video effects. XnGine can generate weather effects, such as snow, sleet and fog; realistic shading; and textured, contoured terrain. Howard described the engine as a true 3D engine capable of real-time phong shading, which helps simulate area lighting effects from sources of light in the environment. Future Shock was developed by a team of 8–10 people. It was one of the first games in the first-person shooter genre to feature fully texture-mapped 3D environments and enemies, as well as one of the first to use mouse-look control. According to Howard, the mouse-look feature was carried over from an editor for the game after the development team had become used to this control scheme.

The game was originally scheduled to release in August 1995. However, a game demo was released in November 1995 and the full game was not released until December. A network, multi-layer module was planned for release in February 1996 but ultimately was not. Virgin Interactive Entertainment distributed the game in the UK, Germany, Australia, Scandinavia, Spain, and Italy.

== Reception ==
Reception

Review scores
Publication	Score
Computer Games Magazine	3/5
Computer Gaming World	3.5/5
GameSpot	8.4/10
Next Generation	2/5
PC Gamer (UK)	92%
PC Gamer (US)	84%
Maximum	4/5
PC PowerPlay	9/10

The Terminator: Future Shock received generally favorable reviews from gaming publications. In the United Kingdom, the game ranked 5th in the best-sellers CD-ROMs for PCs during the week of February 25, 1996 according to the European Leisure Software Publishers Association.

Tal Blevins of GameSpot praised several aspects of the game. He described the game environment as "well thought-out", the control system as "smooth", and the audio-visuals as "superb", noting the familiar movie soundtrack. Phil Bedard of Computer Games Magazine compared the game to Doom, "but with some things thrown in that make it different". Bedard praised the music and stereo sound effects but wished that the game supported a higher resolution. He criticized the character controls, calling them difficult, as well as the occasional gameplay lag caused by a large number of game objects and the lack of network play.

A reviewer for Next Generation praised the game's immersion into the film's post-apocalypse world and noted that the freedom of exploration and destruction sets it apart from other first-person shooters. However, he called it "more frustrating than fun", noting that the freedom of movement necessitates complex controls, which the reviewer described as difficult and cumbersome. He further wrote that the dark color palette makes it challenging to see enemies. A Maximum reviewer called it "a slick, professional blaster that sets new standards in the movie to game license wars". He commented that the game's only weakness is the lack of multiplayer and cited multiple positives: the "tangible and involving" environments, the varied mission objectives, the player controlled vehicles, the story line, the mouse look control, and the variety of weapons.

T. Liam McDonald of PC Gamer called it a "damned fine game in many ways", praising the graphics and sound effects, but he was critical of the awkward controls and the difficulty in aiming, as well as the lack of multiplayer. Simon Cox, writing for the UK-based PC Gamer, praised Future Shock as a scary game and "one of the most atmospheric and believable shoot-'em-ups ever". However, he also considered the controls difficult to use at first. Roy Bassave of Knight Ridder said that the game is the most sophisticated 3D game yet.

In retrospect over a decade later, Todd Howard described the game as a forgotten title.
