= AMF Xtreme Bowling 2006 =

2006 video game

- European PS2 cover art
- Developer: Atomic Planet Entertainment
- Publishers: NA: Mud Duck Productions; EU: Blast Entertainment (PS2)
- Platforms: PlayStation 2, Xbox
- Release: NA: June 13, 2006 (PS2); NA: June 28, 2006(Xbox); EU: October 13, 2006 (PS2)
- Genre: Sports
- Modes: Single-player, multiplayer

AMF Xtreme Bowling 2006 (known as AMF Xtreme Bowling in North America) is a 2006 bowling video game released for the PlayStation 2 and Xbox.

== Gameplay ==
AMF Xtreme Bowling 2006 offers a variety of gameplay options, including Practice, Quick Match, Tournament, League, Pin Challenge, and Match Challenge. Players can create custom characters. The game incorporates a triple-click shot system for bowling, where players set power and accuracy, and adjust spin using an analog stick.

== Reception ==
Reception

Review scores
Publication	Score
All Game Guide	2/5 (PlayStation 2)
Associated Press	D
GameSpot	4.6/10
GamesRadar	1/5
IGN	2/10
Official Xbox Magazine	5/10(Xbox)
TeamXbox	3.4/10(Xbox)

The game holds a 30% rating on Metacritic for the PS2 version of the game and a 34% rating for the Xbox version of the game.

GamerFeed rates the PS2 version of the game a 1.5 out of 5 stating "AMF Xtreme Bowling 2006 tries so hard to be liked, but it's trying in too few areas. It goes more for the flash-in-the-pan presentation rather than on the gameplay, where it struggles completely by being merely nothing at all. Had more emphasis been on the actual bowling, its physics, and the fun of multiplayer, we would be getting somewhere. As is, the game's just a flash-in-the-pan cheaper title that even bowling zealots should avoid. Just do the real thing instead"

IGN gave the game a 2 out of 10 stating "With graphics and sound that do nothing to enhance the package, AMF Xtreme Bowling 2006 isn't just a gutter ball, it's tossing a shot seven lanes over, and crashing it through the floor"

Jon Miller of IGN listed the game at number 9 of his favorite games of 2006.
