= The Terminator (DOS) =

1991 video game

- Developer: Bethesda Softworks
- Publisher: Bethesda Softworks
- Director: Julian LeFay
- Producer: Christopher Weaver
- Programmer: Julian LeFay
- Artists: Nancy Freeman; Sheila McKisic; J. Rainey
- Writers: Julian LeFay; Craig Walton
- Composer: Tom McMail
- Series: Terminator
- Platform: DOS
- Release: July 1991
- Genre: Action-adventure
- Mode: Single-player

The Terminator is a 1991 action-adventure game developed and published by Bethesda Softworks for DOS. It is based on the 1984 film of the same name, and was the first video game based on the Terminator film series.

== Gameplay ==
Targeting a police officer

Set in 1984, the player takes on the role of Kyle Reese and protects Sarah Connor from the Terminator, a cyborg sent back in time to kill her. Alternatively, the player can become the Terminator and try to eliminate Kyle and Sarah. Either way, the player chases his opponent through Los Angeles, buying or stealing weapons and equipment, while attempting to eliminate his enemy and avoid the police.

The game takes place within a huge (roughly 10 × 6 miles or 16 × 10 kilometres) 3-D rendered area of central Los Angeles. The game area runs roughly from Beverly Drive to Central Ave (lengthwise), and from Mulholland Drive to National Blvd (vertically). A game map is included in the box for reference. Though the buildings and their placement within the world is generic, and highways/overpasses have been removed, the streets and their layout are largely accurate. The game also includes some landmarks, such as Dodger Stadium, Griffith Park, and the Silver Lake Reservoir.

== Development and release ==
In mid-1990, Bethesda Softworks announced a deal with the Hemdale Film Corporation to create computer video games based on The Terminator. Digitized voices were used for the game's opening credits and victory screen. According to the game's end credits:

This game was written in 100% assembly and takes up more than 35,000 lines. The game contains approximately 20,000 3D objects. It was developed using Turbo Assembler and Turbo Debugger with all debugging being done remotely. It was created on a variety of 286 and 386 computers. All graphics were created on IBMs and Amigas using DPIII and DA. More than 700 frames of animations were created. The delta mode compression yielded a 100-to-1 ratio.

The game was released in July 1991, coinciding with the theatrical release of the film Terminator 2: Judgment Day. It was the first video game based on the Terminator film series. Two companies had made previous attempts to create a Terminator game in the late 1980s.

== Reception ==
Reception

Review scores
Publication	Score
Aktueller Software Markt	5/12
Computer and Video Games	88/100
Los Angeles Times	3/5
Play Time	55%
Power Play	73%

Todd Threadgill of Computer Gaming World wrote that the game did an "excellent" job of capturing the original film's "spirit." He also wrote that the film had always seemed like "perfect material" on which to base a computer game, and that, "One can only wonder why designers waited so long to produce a game based on The Terminator, but gamers should be thankful that the wait is over."

Jeane Decoster and David Crook of the Los Angeles Times found the game's recreation of the city to be "pretty faithful". However, they were critical of the complex controls and wrote, "Even with the joystick, game movement takes more than 50 keystroke combinations. Just starting the manual transmission vehicles and getting them on the road requires at least 5 finger pretzeling keystrokes".

Reviewers for Computer and Video Games offered praise for the game and the ability to play as either Reese or the Terminator. However, they noted initial difficulty in figuring out the gameplay due to an unclear instruction manual, and also wrote that the 3D effects occasionally go "completely haywire". The Age praised the game's title sequences and Terminator theme music. Guido Alt of Aktueller Software Markt criticized the graphics and controls.

The game topped the charts when it was released.
