= The Elder Scrolls II: Daggerfall =

1996 video game

- North American box art by Louise Sandoval
- Developers: Bethesda Softworks; MediaTech West
- Publisher: Bethesda Softworks
- Director: Julian LeFay
- Designers: Julian LeFay; Bruce Nesmith; Ted Peterson
- Programmers: Hal Bouma; Julian LeFay
- Artists: Mark K. Jones; Hoang Nguyen; Louise Sandoval
- Composers: Eric Heberling; Andy Warr
- Series: The Elder Scrolls
- Engine: XnGine
- Platform: MS-DOS
- Release: NA: September 20, 1996; UK: November 1, 1996
- Genre: Action role-playing
- Mode: Single-player

The Elder Scrolls II: Daggerfall is a 1996 action role-playing game published by Bethesda Softworks. The second installment in the Elder Scrolls series, it was released on September 20, 1996 for MS-DOS, following the success of 1994's The Elder Scrolls: Arena. The story follows the player, sent by the Emperor, to free the ghost of King Lysandus from his earthly shackles and discover what happened to a letter sent from the Emperor to the former queen of Daggerfall.

Compared to its predecessor, Arena, the player can now only travel within two provinces in Tamriel, those being High Rock and Hammerfell. Daggerfall consists of 15,000 cities, towns, villages, and dungeons for the character to explore. Arena's experience-point-based system was replaced with a system that rewards the player for utilizing role-playing elements within the game. Daggerfall includes more customization options, featuring an improved character generation engine as well as a GURPS-influenced class creation system, offering players the chance to create their classes and assign their skills.

The game was a critical and commercial success, with sales of around 700,000 copies by 2000. The game was followed by The Elder Scrolls III: Morrowind in 2002. In 2009, to commemorate the 15th anniversary of the Elder Scrolls franchise, Daggerfall was made free to download from the Bethesda website.

== Gameplay ==
A first-person screenshot from Daggerfall, demonstrating the user interface and graphical capabilities of the game

Daggerfall, like the other games in The Elder Scrolls series, takes place on the fictional continent of Tamriel, in which the player can travel between the provinces of High Rock and Hammerfell. Like all The Elder Scrolls games, the player does not have to follow questlines or fill specific character roles, allowing the player to play the game how they see fit.

The game features over 15,000 cities, towns, villages, and dungeons for the character to explore, which gives the player many options when buying a house. In addition to exploring the world the player can join a number of guilds, orders, and religions; all with unique quests and tasks for the player to do. Joining and contributing to these organizations will allow the player to gain ranks and gain a reputation in the game world, which affects how non-playable characters (NPCs) and other factions view the player. One special feature in Daggerfall is the ability for the player to create their own spells using the game's spell-creation system, which is unlocked by joining the Mages Guild; allowing the player to create custom spells with varying effects, the game will automatically generate the magicka cost of the spell based on the power of effects chosen. Similar to the spell-creation is the ability to enchant equipment. The player can craft or find a variety of equipment. Players also have the ability to become a vampire, werewolf, or wereboar.

The combat system uses mouse movement to determine the direction and effect of the weapon swing in melee combat. Daggerfall features a wide range of enemies; the strongest being the Daedra, which can make the journey through these realms difficult. In order to finish the game the player must visit at least 6–8 of the 47 explorable areas present in the game.

== Plot ==
Daggerfall is set in the Iliac Bay, between the provinces of High Rock and Hammerfell. The player is sent here at the Emperor's request, in the year 405 of the Third Era. He wants the player to do two things: First, the player must free the ghost of King Lysandus from his earthly shackles; Second, the player must discover what happened to a letter from the Emperor to the former queen of Daggerfall. The letter reveals that Lysandus's mother, Nulfaga, knows the location of the Mantella, the key to resurrecting the first Numidium, a powerful brass golem created by the long-lost dwarves. Tiber Septim, the founder of the Empire, previously acquired the Numidium from the dark elves of Morrowind and used it to halt the aggressive expansion of an elvish faction in the distant past.

Seeking to return the Numidium to the Empire's control, the emperor wants his spy to force Nulfaga into revealing the location of the Mantella so that the Blades can finish the reconstruction of the machine. Through a series of mishaps and confusions, the letter fell into the hands of an orc named Gortworg. Not knowing what the Mantella is, Gortworg consults Mannimarco, the King of Worms (the leader of the Necromancers). During this time, the Underking, who originally destroyed the first Numidium because of its misuse by Tiber Septim, is recuperating deep within a tomb of High Rock after expending so much energy destroying it the first time. For the player to give the Mantella to anyone, the player must kill King Lysandus's murderer and put his ghost to rest. After accomplishing this, the player must steal the totem of Tiber Septim from King Gothryd of Daggerfall and free the Mantella from its prison in Aetherius. Following this, the player has six choices regarding how to deal with the Mantella.

Daggerfall has several endings:

- If the player gives the Mantella to the Underking, he absorbs its power, passes into eternal rest, and creates a large "magicka-free" area around himself.
- If Gortworg is victorious, he uses the Numidium to destroy the Imperial forces and the "Bay Kings," the rulers of the several provinces of the Iliac Bay. The Underking arrives shortly thereafter to destroy the first Numidium, losing his life. Gortworg then succeeds in creating Orsinium, a kingdom of Orcs.
- If the Blades are victorious, they succeed in recreating the first Numidium and use it to defeat the Bay Kings and the Orcs, as well as unite all the provinces of Tamriel under the empire once again.
- If any of the Bay Kings win, that king will use the first Numidium to defeat all the other kings just before the Underking destroys him and itself.
- If Mannimarco receives the Mantella, he uses it to make himself a god.
- One more ending, as described in the strategy guide The Daggerfall Chronicles and elsewhere, was planned by Bethesda, but is not achievable in-game: if the player activates the Mantella while in possession of the totem (the controlling device of the Numidium), the Numidium will slay the player, go out of control, and be destroyed by Imperial forces.

== Development ==
The player can travel almost anywhere on the map, each area featuring hundreds of visitable locations.

Work on The Elder Scrolls II: Daggerfall began immediately after The Elder Scrolls: Arena's release in March 1994. The project saw Ted Peterson assigned the role of lead game designer. Originally titled Mournhold and set in the province of Morrowind, the game was eventually relocated to the provinces of High Rock and Hammerfell, in Tamriel's northwest.

By mid-1994 Daggerfall was the new name. Developers at first planned to connect it with Arena and one or two more games as done with Might and Magic: World of Xeen, but Arena's experience-point based system was replaced with one that rewards the player for actually role-playing their character. Daggerfall features an improved character generation engine, one that includes not only Arena's basic class choices, but also a system that could allow players to create their own classes and assign their own skills, with an option to pick GURPS-inspired bonuses, disadvantages, or disabilities.

Daggerfall was initially developed with an updated 2.5D raycast engine, but it was eventually dropped in favor of XnGine, one of the first truly 3D engines. Daggerfall realized a gameworld "the size of Great Britain," or approximately 209,331 square kilometers filled with 15,000 towns and a population of 750,000. According to Julian LeFay, "The whole idea with Daggerfall was that, like a pen-and-paper role-playing game, you could play for years. You know, keep the same characters, keep on doing stuff." A YouTube channel called "How Big is the Map?" walked across the entire map, a feat that took a total of 69 hours.

Daggerfall, in Peterson's opinion, was only lightly influenced by contemporary video games, as they simply "weren't very interesting." "I can remember playing the latest King's Quest, Doom, and Sam & Max Hit the Road while working on it, but I can't say they had any profound impact on the story or design." Daggerfall's most profound influences came from whatever analog games and literature Julian LeFay or Ted Peterson happened to be playing or reading at the time, such as Dumas's The Man in the Iron Mask, which influenced "the quest where the player had to find the missing Prince of Sentinel," and Vampire: The Masquerade, which influenced "the idea of vampire tribes throughout the region."

Olympia, Washington based MediaTech West, which was acquired by Bethesda in 1995, helped develop the game.

Daggerfall was completed on August 31, 1996, almost three years after production began. It was released in North America on September 20, within the game's intended release window, and in the United Kingdom on November 1. Like that of Arena, Daggerfall's release suffered from buggy code; while the game was patched multiple times, users were still upset about its stability. The yearning to avoid what were, in LeFay's words, "all the stupid patches we had for Daggerfall" led to a more cautious release schedule in the future. Ted Peterson left Bethesda following Daggerfall's release and went to work for a series of companies in Los Angeles and San Francisco: Film Roman, AnyRiver Entertainment, Activision, and Savage Entertainment.

=== Community support ===
Although Daggerfall did not come with official modding tools like later The Elder Scrolls releases, enthusiasts for the game developed tools on their own to access the game's content soon after its release; as a result, a number of additional quests, graphical enhancements, and gameplay features were developed by third parties. Notable works include AndyFall and DaedraFall.

After the end of official support by Bethesda, some mod makers have repaired bugs in the latest official release of Daggerfall with community patches or engine remakes. The DFQFIX quest-fix pack and HackFall were the most recent attempts at this. DaggerfallSetup is a community-made Daggerfall installer for modern Windows versions. The aim of this project is to install and easily run a fully patched Daggerfall on a modern Windows operating system under usage of the DOSBox emulator. This game installer setup contains many official and unofficial patches and also fan translations for several languages, including French, Russian, Spanish, and German.

There are also fan-made game engine rewrite projects for Daggerfall, which aim for native compatibility with modern operating systems and hardware, as opposed to being run in DOS, or through DOSBox. The XL Engine was one of the first attempts, and started in June 2009 as DaggerXL before being merged in 2011 with another engine rewrite project called DarkXL to become The XL Engine. The eventual goal of the project was to create an updated playing environment for Daggerfall, Dark Forces, Outlaws, Blood and other classic games. As a result of the merger, a significant amount of the project's development focused on the refactoring of the XL Engine itself. Additional goals – for Daggerfall specifically – included the implementation of features that were initially promised for the game, but were not included (or only partially coded in) at the time of its release in 1996. By August 2012, DaggerXL supported character creation, the rendering of all provinces and dungeons, user-definable display resolution (including smoothed terrain and Bloom), and basic gameplay. In April 2018 the XL Engine's source code was released under MIT license on GitHub. On April 23, 2020, the author – luciusDXL – took down the XL Engine website and announced via a post on the project's GitHub that the project was officially dead, and would not resume development in the future, with their involvement ceasing back in 2016. They cited "other 'real life' commitments and a lack of time (and sometimes ability) to continue" as the motivating factors. They also commented that, in the years since, there had been other projects that had achieved everything they wanted to do with XL Engine, and that people should look to those projects instead.

Daggerfall Unity is another open-source recreation of Daggerfall. Beginning development in August 2014, it is the most mature Daggerfall project released, and uses the Unity game engine to rewrite the game with updated graphics and mechanics, as well as full mod support through Nexus Mods. With the release of the first Alpha in July 2019, it was made available for download on the project's official website. Unlike DaggerXL, Daggerfall Unity is playable from start to finish with all the core features of the original Daggerfall. Daggerfall Unity was published to GOG.com with a selection of mods pre-installed on June 15, 2022, and on December 31, 2023, the project was officially declared complete. It was delisted from GOG in February 2025, although it is still available elsewhere.

== Reception ==
=== Sales ===
For Daggerfall's launch on September 20, shipments of around 120,000 copies were delivered to stores. The game surpassed Bethesda's internal estimates and became an immediate hit: more than 100,000 copies were sold within two days of release. As a result, supplies were depleted at many retailers. While a second printing of Daggerfall was shipped on September 24, Next Generation reported at the time that "this shipment is expected to be considerably smaller than the first due to production limitations". In the United States, the game debuted in fourth place on PC Data's monthly computer game sales chart for September 1996. It secured sixth place the following month, before dropping to position 16 in November.

According to Bethesda marketing director Pete Hines, Daggerfall sold roughly 700,000 copies by mid-2000 and was "still selling four years after release". He called it likely the company's biggest success by that time.

=== Critical reviews ===
Reception

Review scores
Publication	Score
AllGame	4/5
Computer Gaming World	4.5/5
Next Generation	5/5
PC Gamer (UK)	89%
PC Gamer (US)	90%
PC Zone	65/100
PC Magazine	4/5
Computer Games Strategy Plus	4.5/5
PC Games	A−

Awards
Publication	Award
PC Gamer US	Best Roleplaying Game 1996
Computer Gaming World	Role-Playing Game of the Year
PC Games	Game of the Month
Codie awards	"Best Adventure/Role-Playing Software Game" (finalist)

Daggerfall was met with critical acclaim, surpassing its predecessor in Game of the Year Awards. It was named the best computer role-playing game (CRPG) of 1996 by Computer Gaming World and PC Gamer US, and won the Spotlight Award for "Adventure/RPG Game of the Year" from the Game Developers Conference. It was also nominated as the year's best CRPG by GameSpot and Computer Games Strategy Plus, but lost both awards to Diablo. The editors of Computer Gaming World summarized that the game "is not perfect, but it is revolutionary".

Reviewing the game in PC Gamer US, Michael Wolf hailed it as "about as close to reality (or is that fantasy?) as you can get in a computer game". Although he criticized its bugs and writing mistakes, he summarized Daggerfall as "one of the most realistic, involved, and impressive RPGs on the market". Prior to the game's release, Computer Gaming World ranked it as the eighth top vaporware title in computer game history. The editors wrote: "Featuritis and creeping technology held up this potential jewel for far too long." Despite their frustration with the delay, the publication later awarded the game 4.5/5.

In PC Magazine, Michael E. Ryan called it "revolutionary" and wrote that it "may be the best RPG since Origin's Ultima IV". Like Wolf, he found fault with the game's bugs, the number of which he said "shocked" the magazine's staff. Despite these issues, Ryan remarked that the staff became "hopelessly addicted to Daggerfall's endless possibilities and game play". A reviewer for Next Generation wrote that Daggerfall "comes as close as anything ever has" to simulating real life, and that the long wait for the game was "hands down, worth it". James Flynn of PC Gamer UK praised the game's size, depth and role-playing mechanics, but qualified that it is "very, very slow" and "as large and detailed as a game could ever become without collapsing under its own weight". He argued that the game's biggest flaw is its visuals and wrote: "With all the kit available to programmers and artists today, quite how they've managed to produce such an ugly grey look with Spectrum fonts is a mystery."

Andy Backer of Computer Games Strategy Plus called Daggerfall "a flawed masterpiece", noting that bugs held it back from perfection. However, he wrote that it "may be the best CRPG of all time", as well as "the best CRPG of the year, period". In PC Zone, Charlie Brooker called the game's core concept of simulating a virtual world "a sound one" and suggested that Daggerfall could have succeeded as a MUD. However, he believed that the game was a failed experiment, as contemporary technology could not generate a sufficiently interesting single-player world. Brooker argued: "What's the point in being able to go where you like and do what you want if none of it's as interesting as real life?"

Andy Butcher reviewed The Elder Scrolls: Daggerfall for Arcane magazine, rating it a 7 out of 10 overall, and stated that "If you're prepared to spend the time playing Daggerfall, its size and scope can be rewarding, and in many ways it's the nearest computer equivalent to the freedom of a real roleplaying game. However, in a tabletop RPG there's a ref to make judgements about what's interesting and what should be skipped over, and this is what Daggerfall lacks."

Game Revolution's review of the game described it as "easily the RPG of the year" and "one of the BEST roleplaying games in history (so far)". Writing for GameSpot in 1996, Trent Ward opined that Bethesda "has finally returned to the RPGs of the old school and created an adventure that will take even the most experienced gamer months to unravel". PC Gamer Magazine ranked Daggerfall among their list of 'The Most Ambitious PC Games'.

In 1997, the editors of PC Gamer US named Daggerfall the 50th best game of all time, while those of PC Gamer UK placed it a No. 33 on their list. The former publication hailed it as "a superlative RPG", but again criticized its numerous bugs; the latter called it "so vastly massive that it threatens to collapse under its own gargantuan weight".

=== Lawsuit ===
Media Technology Limited, Bethesda Softworks' parent company, brought a libel suit against U.S. senators Joe Lieberman and Herb Kohl for comments they made about Daggerfall's appropriateness for children. Lieberman and Kohl characterized the suit as a publicity stunt intended to boost holiday sales of Daggerfall.
