= Christopher Weaver =

American entrepreneur and software developer

- Born: Christopher Scot Weaver; February 6, 1951 (age 75); New York City, US
- Education: Dual Master's degrees (Japanese and Computer Science) and a dual CAS (doctoral) degree in Japanese and Physics
- Alma mater: Wesleyan University, Massachusetts Institute of Technology
- Occupations: Software and technology innovator, Entrepreneur, Educator at MIT
- Organization: Bethesda Softworks
- Known for: Founder of Bethesda Softworks and cofounder of ZeniMax Media
- Notable work: One of the creators of The Elder Scrolls series

Christopher Scot Weaver (born February 6, 1951) is an American entrepreneur, software developer, scientist, author, and educator. He is known for founding Bethesda Softworks, where he was one of the creators of The Elder Scrolls role-playing series.

Weaver and Bethesda are credited with developing the first real-time physics engine for sports simulation, used in Bethesda's Gridiron! video game. Weaver also developed game screen captioning for the deaf and made it available as open source software.

== Career ==
At Hobart and William Smith Colleges, Weaver helped redesign the campus radio and television studios, and modified Link Trainers to better simulate situational spatial awareness. Because of this experience, he created AeroTechnology Enterprises, a company specializing in analog training simulators for aviation.

Weaver moved to New York for post-graduate work at Columbia University and got a night job as an Assistant Director of News at NBC. He was then hired by the American Broadcasting Company, where he established the first office of Technology Forecasting for the network. He then became the Vice-President for Science and Technology at the National Cable Television Association (NCTA), followed by an appointment as Chief Engineer to the Congressional Subcommittee on Communications and Technology.

Weaver later started Videomagic Laboratories, a company working in vehicular simulators for military and entertainment purposes. He temporarily moved to Los Angeles to work on the Universal Studios lot in Burbank, working on new camera technology with Panavision for interactive media. During this time, Weaver contributed to early work in graphical interfaces, optical storage, and computer-assisted editing, including encoding spatial information for tracking camera shots.

In the 1980s, Weaver was introduced to video games when he was asked by one of his engineers to look at a football game idea he was developing. Weaver felt it "was boring" and sought to create a more realistic gameplay by incorporating physics. This meant that players would perform based on their masses and accelerations, adding a layer of reality-based strategy to the game. They decided to produce the game, resulting in the formation of Bethesda Softworks. The game was released as Gridiron! for the Atari ST and Commodore 64/128, in 1986. Bethesda later found widespread success as a game developer with its Elder Scrolls series of games.

In 1999, Weaver cofounded ZeniMax Media with Robert A. Altman, as a new parent company for Bethesda. Weaver contributed his stake in Bethesda to ZeniMax, and served as CTO until 2002, then was pushed out. He filed a lawsuit against ZeniMax, claiming he was ousted by his new business partners and was owed severance when ZeniMax didn't renew his employment contract. The lawsuit was ongoing as of 2007, and at that time Weaver was still a 33% stockholder.

== Current ==
As of 2016, Weaver has been pursuing a career in academia, in which he teaches computational media in the College of Integrative Sciences at Wesleyan University. He also teaches in the Comparative Media Studies and Engineering departments at MIT. He is a Fellow of the Futures of Entertainment Consortium; a Board Member of the Communications Technology Roadmap Group and a visiting scientist in the Microphotonics Center. Recently, he was asked to co-direct a new Center at MIT, which will use the science and epistemology of game tools to enhance STEM education for children of multiple age groups.

Weaver continues to serve on committees for various national and international organizations. Some of his past and present appointments include:

- American Association for the Advancement of Science
- National Academy of Sciences
- National Academy of Engineering
- National Research Council
- International Game Developers Association
- Cable Telecommunications Research Institute
- Society of Cable Television Engineers
- Aspen Institute
- Institute of Electrical and Electronics Engineers

In 2016, as part of the MIT educational contingent, he became Director of Interactive Simulation for the AIM Photonics Academy.

He has acted as technical advisor to various governments and organizations, including the White House, Office of Technology Policy, Congressional Committee of House Administration and the Department of Homeland Security. Weaver has been a technical advisor to numerous films including Independence Day, where writer/producer Dean Devlin used Weaver as the basis for the film character David Levinson (played by Jeff Goldblum) and on the science fiction film, Geostorm.

In 2005, Weaver was inducted into the Cosmos Club for excellence in Engineering.

In 2016, Weaver was appointed a Distinguished Research Scholar by the Smithsonian Institution and installed as the first Project Director of the newly created Video Game Pioneers Archive within the Lemelson Center for the Study of Invention and Innovation.

== Publications ==
Weaver has been published in a number of science and technology journals and periodicals, including: the MIT Microphotonics Center, IEEE Spectrum, Techline, Edge Magazine, SCTE Journal, NCTA Bulletin, ITU Standards, Video Magazine, and Next Generation Magazine on subjects ranging from microprocessors to copyright law. He is also a co-writer/creator of the multi-volume science-fiction series The Tenth Planet published by Ballantine Books and was the technical editor and contributor for Fundamentals of Game Design.

== Personal life ==
Weaver is a volunteer air ambulance pilot for AngelFlight and holds numerous FAA licenses and type certificates. He is married to Nanci Weaver. In 1994, he was married to Dr Constance Bohon, chief of gynecology of Columbia Hospital for Women, and they had a son named Isaac.
