= AMF Bowling Pinbusters! =

2007 video game

- Developer: Atomic Planet Entertainment
- Publishers: Mud Duck Productions (2007) (Nintendo Wii); Vir2L Studios (2008) (Nintendo Wii); Vir2L Studios (Nintendo DS)
- Platforms: Nintendo Wii, Nintendo DS, iOS, N-Gage
- Release: Wii; NA: November 20, 2007; EU: March 14, 2008; DS; NA: July 7, 2008; EU: August 22, 2008; iOS; August 7, 2009
- Genre: Sports (Bowling)
- Mode: Multiplayer

AMF Bowling Pinbusters! is a bowling sports-based video game.

== Gameplay ==

The Wii controller allows the player to mimic real bowling by using typical bowling movements. The game environment offers mirrored balls, hot neon lights, and strobe effects. Several mini-games are available such as Obstacles and Pool Bowl.

Players can choose from eight unique characters, such as Cody the Surfer, Sarge the Drill Sergeant, Punk Rock Girl Roxy, Cowgirl Sally, and Rapper Big Money – each with their own personality.

== Development ==
The DS version of the game was announced in April 2008. The game was released for the N-Gage Service on June 17, 2009.

== Reception ==
Reception

Aggregate score
Aggregator	Score	
Aggregator	DS	Wii
Metacritic	51/100	33/100

Review scores
Publication	Score	
Publication	DS	Wii
Eurogamer	N/A	2/10
GamesMaster	N/A	38%
GamesRadar+	N/A	2/5
IGN	4.8/10	2/10
NGamer	N/A	65%

The DS version received "mixed" reviews, while the Wii version received "unfavorable" reviews, according to the review aggregation website Metacritic.

One common complaint was that the latter console version lacked an option to play left-handed. IGN complained about the Wii version's offensive stereotypes and terrible gameplay, and pointed out that Wii Sports had a better bowling simulation for free. GamesRadar+ said of the same console version, "It is, as a whole, considerably worse than what is one-fifth of Wii Sports - in look, execution and enjoyment."

== See also ==
- List of Wii games
