= Bethesda Softworks =

American video game publisher

Bethesda Softworks LLC
- Logo used since 2010
- Type: Subsidiary
- Industry: Video games
- Founded: June 28, 1986; 40 years ago in Bethesda, Maryland, United States
- Founder: Christopher Weaver
- Headquarters: Rockville, Maryland, United States
- Area served: Worldwide
- Key people: Jill Braff (President)
- Products: List of Bethesda Softworks video games
- Parent: Media Technology Limited; (1986–1999); ZeniMax Media; (1999–present)
- Divisions: Bethesda Game Studios
- Website: bethesda.net

Bethesda Softworks LLC is an American video game publisher based in Rockville, Maryland. The company was founded by Christopher Weaver in 1986 as a division of Media Technology Limited. In 1999, it became a subsidiary of ZeniMax Media. In its first 15 years, it was a video game developer and self-published its titles. In 2001, Bethesda spun off its in-house development team into Bethesda Game Studios, leaving Bethesda Softworks to focus on publishing operations.

In March 2021, Microsoft acquired Bethesda's parent company ZeniMax Media, maintaining that the company will continue to operate as a separate business. Part of the Xbox division, Bethesda Softworks retains its function as the publisher of games developed by the different studios under ZeniMax Media.

== History ==
=== 1980s ===
Bethesda Softworks' original logo, 1986

Before founding Bethesda Softworks, Christopher Weaver was a technology forecaster and a communications engineer in the television and cable industries. After finishing graduate school, he was hired by the American Broadcasting Company, where he wrote several memos about "the importance of alternative distribution systems and how satellites and broadband networks would impact network television", which landed him the position of manager of technology forecasting. After several national magazines quoted his articles on "the exciting prospects for cabled distribution systems", he was recruited by the National Cable Television Association and created its Office of Science and Technology, where he helped design high-speed data communication systems for several member companies of the association. Eventually, Weaver became the chief engineer for the United States House Energy Subcommittee on Communications and Technology, where he influenced legislation that affected the telephone, television, and cable industries.

In the meantime, Weaver also founded VideoMagic Laboratories with a friend from the Architecture Machine Group at the Massachusetts Institute of Technology (MIT). They authored and assembled a 400-page business plan to commercialize their prior lab work and, through the Industrial Liaison Office at MIT, came in contact with a wealthy family in the electronics industry that provided VideoMagic with venture capital. The company developed several technologies, including location-based entertainment systems, that Weaver deemed "radical and cutting-edge" but put out prematurely, causing little commercial return. The funding family, having financial issues of its own, dropped out of the venture and sold off some of VideoMagic's properties. After leaving the House Subcommittee some years later, Weaver established Media Technology Associates, Limited (renamed Media Technology Limited in March 1988) in June 1981. The company provided engineering and media consulting for private companies and government organizations. Media Technology had offices in Maryland and New York.

At Media Technology, Weaver worked with Ed Fletcher, an electrical engineer with whom he had collaborated at VideoMagic, on video games for LaserDisc-based systems until that industry crashed in 1984. While waiting for potential new contracts, the company acquired an Amiga personal computer with which the two began to experiment. Fletcher was a fan of American football and suggested that they develop a football video game for the system, which Weaver supported despite no interest in the sport. Fletcher developed the game, later named Gridiron!, out of Weaver's house in Bethesda, Maryland, in roughly nine months. His initial approach was to use lookup tables to map player inputs to predetermined outcomes. Weaver disliked this concept and, at his behest, he and Fletcher devised a more realistic, physics-based system. No artists or animators were involved in the project, which gave the game a sub-par graphical presentation for the time.

Weaver formed Bethesda Softworks "on the proverbial kitchen table" of his Bethesda home as a division of Media Technology on June 28, 1986. The formation was described as an experiment "to see if the PC market was a viable place to develop games". Weaver originally named the company "Softwerke" but found that the name was taken by a company based in Virginia. Weaver and the owner of that company agreed to co-exist rather than fight over the title, and Weaver changed the name of his company to Bethesda Softworks. He had considered creating a unique name, such as one using the word "magic" after a quote from Arthur C. Clarke, but "Bethesda Softworks" ultimately stuck. Unlike VideoMagic, Bethesda Softworks was entirely self-funded, starting with roughly US$100,000, and was not attached to any business plan. Gridiron! was released as the company's first game later in 1986 for the Amiga, Atari ST, and Commodore 64 systems. The initial release of a few hundred copies distributed in plastic bags was sold out within one week, to the surprise of the team.

Gridiron! scored respectably in the gaming press. Electronic Arts was working on the first John Madden Football, and hired Bethesda to help finish developing it, and acquired distribution rights for future versions of Gridiron!. In June 1988, after no new cross-console version of Gridiron! had been released, Bethesda stopped work on the project and sued Electronic Arts for US$7.3 million, claiming EA halted the release while incorporating many of its elements into Madden. The case was resolved out of court.

Courteney Cox, later known for her role in the sitcom Friends, worked at the publisher briefly in the 1980s. Former hockey player Bobby Orr reportedly had a hand in a Bethesda game called Slapshot!.

=== 1990s ===
In 1990, the company moved from Bethesda to Rockville, Maryland. That same year, the company released By Design, a graphic enhancing software.

The first game Bethesda published and developed, based on a popular film franchise, was The Terminator for MS-DOS. The title was released in July 1991, coinciding with the theatrical release of the film Terminator 2: Judgment Day.

By February 1993, the company employed 40 people.

In 1994, the company released its best-known project at the time, The Elder Scrolls: Arena. The first game in The Elder Scrolls role-playing video game series was the work of Programmer Julian LeFay, Director and Producer Vijay Lakshman as well as others. Several sequels have been released since including The Elder Scrolls II: Daggerfall, which was released in September 1996.

Between 1994 and 1997, Bethesda was developing a space combat game titled The 10th Planet. It was a collaboration between Bethesda and Roland Emmerich's Centropolis Entertainment. During development, Centropolis chose to stop working on the game due to the company's commitments to its films. The project was never released.

In 1995, Bethesda Softworks acquired Noctropolis developer Flashpoint Productions, which Brent Erickson had founded in 1992.

In July 1995, Bruce Nesmith joined Bethesda as Senior Producer.

In August 1995, Bethesda Softworks launched its website on the World Wide Web.

In 1997, Bethesda acquired XL Translab, a Washington, D.C., graphics company that stemmed from the Catholic University School of Architecture and Planning. It was moved to Bethesda Softworks' Rockville headquarters. XL Translab had previously done work for PBS and Fortune 500 companies. By 1996, Bethesda Softworks had become the third-biggest player in the privately held PC publishing industry after LucasArts and Interplay Entertainment with 75 employees by that year and revenues of $25 million by 1997.

In June and July 1997, Bethesda announced a partnership with CBS Enterprises to produce the first-ever true companion PC series of games for the television series Pensacola: Wings of Gold. By December 1997, the first CD-ROM game was still in production.

In 1997 and 1998, Bethesda released two The Elder Scrolls spin-offs based on Daggerfall's code, Battlespire and Redguard, neither of which were as successful as Daggerfall and Arena. The downturn in sales affected many of their games, and the company considered filing for bankruptcy as a result.

In October 1999, Pete Hines joined Bethesda to head up its marketing department, running it as what he described as a one-man band. At the start of his tenure, the company had reduced to around 15 people in its Rockville headquarters.

In 1999, Weaver and Robert A. Altman formed the holding company ZeniMax Media. In an interview with Edge, he described the company as being a top-level administrative structure rather than a "parent company" for its holdings, explaining that "ZeniMax and Bethesda for all intents and purposes are one thing. Bethesda has no accounting department, we have no finance, we have no legal, our legal department [and] our financial department is ZeniMax, we all operate as one unit." According to the designer Bruce Nesmith, Altman was principally interested in Bethesda's web development business at Vir2L Studios, not the game development aspect. ZeniMax acquired Media Technology in July 1999 and Bethesda Softworks was reorganized as a division of ZeniMax. By then Bethesda employed nearly 100 people.

=== 2000s ===
In 2001, Bethesda Game Studios was established as the development team, leaving Bethesda Softworks to focus on all publishing operations of ZeniMax Media.

In 2002, Weaver stopped being employed by ZeniMax. He later filed a lawsuit against ZeniMax, claiming he was ousted by his new business partners after giving them access to his brand and was owed US$1.2 million in severance pay. ZeniMax filed counterclaims and moved to dismiss the case, claiming Weaver had gone through emails of other employees to find evidence. This dismissal was later vacated on appeal, and the parties settled out of court. Weaver remained a major shareholder in the company; as of 2007, he said that he still owned 33% of ZeniMax's stock. Providence Equity bought 25% of ZeniMax's stock in late 2007, and an additional stake in 2010.

In 2004, Bethesda Softworks acquired the Fallout series from Interplay Entertainment, with the development of Fallout 3 being handed over to Bethesda Game Studios. Fallout 3 was released on October 28, 2008. Five downloadable content packs for Fallout 3 were released in the year following its release — Operation: Anchorage, The Pitt, Broken Steel, Point Lookout, and Mothership Zeta. Obsidian Entertainment's new Fallout title, Fallout: New Vegas was published in 2010. Fallout 4 was released on November 10, 2015.

Between 2004 and 2008, ZeniMax's subsidiaries Mud Duck Productions and Vir2L Studios released four bowling games for various platforms — AMF Bowling 2004, AMF Xtreme Bowling 2006, AMF Bowling World Lanes, and AMF Bowling Pinbusters!.

In January 2006, Bethesda acquired the rights to develop games based on the Star Trek franchise. The first game published by the company was Star Trek: Encounters, released in 2006.

In September 2009, Bethesda filed a lawsuit against Interplay Entertainment, after being unsatisfied with Interplay's development of the Fallout massively multiplayer online game project. Bethesda stopped funding the project, and Interplay was forced to abandon work on it.

Between 2007 and 2010, Bethesda raised US$450 million in new capital from Providence Equity Partners to fund expansion efforts. In February 2008, the company opened a European publishing arm in London, named ZeniMax Europe, to distribute titles throughout UK/EMEA territories under the Bethesda Softworks brand. This was followed in by opening publishing offices in Tokyo, Frankfurt, Paris, Eindhoven, Hong Kong, Sydney and Moscow in 2008, 2010, 2012, 2013 and 2018 respectively.

On June 24, 2009, ZeniMax Media acquired Doom developer id Software, whose titles, including Rage, would be published by Bethesda Softworks. Between 2009 and 2012, the company expanded publishing operations, with games from independent third-party developers such as Rebellion Developments's Rogue Warrior, Artificial Mind and Movement's Wet, Splash Damage's Brink, and inXile's Hunted: The Demon's Forge.

=== 2010s ===
On October 28, 2010, ZeniMax Media acquired Shinji Mikami's company Tango Gameworks, whose titles, including The Evil Within, would be published by Bethesda Softworks until 2024.

In 2011, Bethesda filed a lawsuit against Mojang (developers of Minecraft) for using Scrolls as the name of a new digital card game, which sounded too close to Bethesda's The Elder Scrolls trademark.

In the mid-2010s, Bethesda began to experiment with new kinds of games, releasing Fallout Shelter, its first mobile, free-to-play game in the summer of 2015. A year later, it released a reboot of id Software's Doom, after several years of development as a failed attempt to produce a sequel to Doom 3. Later that year, Zen Studios released virtual pinball adaptations of three games that Bethesda released during the decade thus far (The Elder Scrolls V: Skyrim, Fallout 4 and the 2016 reboot of Doom) as the Bethesda Pinball collection for its pinball games. Bethesda went on to release two more free-to-play mobile games based on The Elder Scrolls series, a card battle game titled The Elder Scrolls: Legends in 2017 and a first-person role-playing game titled The Elder Scrolls: Blades in 2019.

When Nintendo unveiled its new hybrid console, the Nintendo Switch, Bethesda expressed support for it and released ports of The Elder Scrolls V: Skyrim and Doom for that system in November 2017. A year later, it also ported Fallout Shelter, and has future plans to do the same for its two Elder Scrolls mobile games.

Games such as Prey, Dishonored: Death of the Outsider, The Evil Within 2, and Wolfenstein II: The New Colossus have not sold as well as compared to Fallout and The Elder Scrolls according to Bethesda's Pete Hines.

In late 2018, Bethesda announced and released its first massively multiplayer online game, Fallout 76, a prequel to the Fallout series. Upon its initial release, it was given mixed reviews for its poor quality and was embroiled in several other controversies, including problems with tie-in products and a data breach.

The following year saw Bethesda announce sequels to Rage and Doom, Rage 2 and Doom Eternal. The former was released on May 14, while the latter released in early 2020 shortly after the COVID-19 pandemic reached the United States, following a series of delays for polish after the negative reception of Fallout 76's initial launch.

In November 2019, Human Head Studios shut down while Bethesda established a new studio, Roundhouse Studios, offering all Human Head employees a position within it.

In 2016, Bethesda had released its own application launcher for PC. Fallout 76 and Fallout Shelter were exclusives to the launcher before eventually released on Steam. In 2022, Bethesda shut down the launcher. The launcher was mostly met with negative reception. PC Gamer said that "Bethesda's launcher seems to be designed more as a pretty interface to purchase Bethesda's games than a way of managing them. [...] the client feels more like a store than anything."

=== 2020s ===
In March 2020, Bethesda Softworks published Doom Eternal, a sequel to the 2016 reboot for PlayStation 4, Windows, Xbox One and the Stadia games streaming service from Google. The game's release was one of many that was affected by the impact of the coronavirus (COVID-19) pandemic on the games industry, prompting retailers such as GameStop to begin selling physical copies a day in advance of its general release to minimize crowding of customers. To coincide with Eternal's original release, a remaster of Doom 64 was also launched as both a standalone release, and as a pre-order bonus for the former game on the aforementioned platforms. The re-release was co-developed by id Software and Nightdive Studios, and includes a new post-campaign expansion.

In September 2020, Microsoft entered an agreement to acquire Bethesda's parent company ZeniMax Media for $7.5 billion, gaining ownership over all of Bethesda's associated development teams, now as part of Microsoft Gaming. The agreement stipulated that Bethesda continued to finance and self-publish its games and that titles on other platforms would be decided on a "case-by-case" basis, but that the merger would also allow Bethesda's existing back-catalog of titles to become available on Microsoft's Xbox Game Pass service for console, PC and cloud, and that select future games from the publisher would become exclusives for Windows and the Xbox Series X/S consoles, which simultaneously launched that November. The acquisition of ZeniMax Media was formally completed on March 9, 2021. Following the merger's completion, Xbox CEO Phil Spencer clarified that future titles from Bethesda would primarily ship on any platforms hosting Xbox Game Pass.

In September 2021, Bethesda published Deathloop, a first-person shooter with time-warping mechanics from Arkane Lyon. The following March, Bethesda released Ghostwire: Tokyo, a first-person horror-themed action-adventure game developed by Tango Gameworks. Both games were announced as being timed console exclusives for PlayStation 5 before Microsoft purchased ZeniMax Media, an existing contractual obligation that would be honored by Microsoft despite the amended terms. Both titles were eventually released on Xbox Series X/S a year following their respective PlayStation 5 versions.

In January 2023, Bethesda announced and released Hi-Fi Rush from Tango Gameworks. The publisher purposely kept the game's development secret by due to possible skepticism and uncertainty regarding audience feedback. In May 2023, Bethesda launched Redfall for Windows and Xbox Series X/S from Arkane Austin, though it received a largely mixed to negative reception, with scrutiny directed towards the uninspired narrative, the overall repetitiveness in objectives during the campaign, and consistent technical problems. In September 2023, Bethesda published Starfield for Windows and Xbox Series X/S. Developed by Bethesda Game Studios, the game marked the studio's first wholly original intellectual property in over 25 years. Upon the early access launch, the game reached a peak of 230,000 concurrent players on Steam within two hours. Xbox CEO Phil Spencer announced on launch day that the game subsequently became the most played Xbox Series X/S-exclusive game since the console's launch, as well as the most wish-listed game on Steam for either Xbox or Bethesda in their respective histories. Starfield reached ten million players across Xbox and PC by September 19, making it the biggest launch period in Bethesda's history as a publisher.

In October 2023, Bethesda's head of publishing Pete Hines announced he would be retiring. Later that month, a corporate restructuring of the newly formed Microsoft Gaming subsidiary took place following Microsoft's acquisition of Activision-Blizzard, that saw the promotion of executive Matt Booty from president of Xbox to overseeing its entire Game Content and Studios business, with Jamie Leder still retaining supervision over ZeniMax Media as a "limited integration entity" that would now report to Matt. In December 2023, Jill Braff was appointed to the role as head of Bethesda and ZeniMax Media's development teams, while simultaneously retaining her existing duties as the General Manager of Integrations and Casual Games for Xbox Game Studios.

In May 2024, Microsoft announced that it was closing Arkane Austin, Tango Gameworks and Alpha Dog Games as part of a significant organization restructure of Bethesda's operations. Xbox Game Content and Studios head Matt Booty explained that the shuttering of the studios reflected a desire to prioritize the development of "high-impact titles" and investing more in Bethesda's catalogue of blockbuster franchises. Mobile developer Roundhouse Studios also ceased activity, with its team being consolidated into ZeniMax Online Studios. Development of all DLC content for Redfall also ceased. Xbox president Sarah Bond cited a necessity to keep its gaming business growing through periods of transition and industry stagnation, as a reason for the studio closures. Addressing Tango Gameworks directly, she proposed that the varying metrics for success on a game-by-game basis was examined when deciding to shut the studio down. Despite Tango's closure, Matt Booty reiterated the necessity for Xbox to house smaller budget titles for "prestige and awards" much like Hi-Fi Rush. On August 12, 2024, South Korean publisher Krafton announced it had entered an agreement with Microsoft Gaming and Bethesda to revive and acquire Tango Gameworks in its entirety, which also included the transferral of the Hi-Fi Rush license. Microsoft retained the publishing rights to Tango Gameworks existing games with the exception of Hi-Fi Rush which was transferred to Krafton on November 14, 2025.

== Games published ==
- Wayne Gretzky Hockey (1988–1992)
- Terminator series (1990–1996)
- The Elder Scrolls series (1994–present)
- Symbiocom (1998)
- Zero Critical (1998)
- IHRA Drag Racing series (2000–2006)
- Pirates of the Caribbean series (2003–2006)
- Call of Cthulhu: Dark Corners of the Earth (2005)
- Star Trek series (2006–2007)
- Fallout series (2008–present) (Note: Published by Interplay Entertainment in 1997–2004.)
- Wet (2009)
- Rogue Warrior (2009)
- Rage series (2010–2019)
- Brink (2011)
- Hunted: The Demon's Forge (2011)
- Dishonored series (2012–2017)
- Doom series (2012–present)
- Wolfenstein series (2014–present)
- The Evil Within series (2014–2017)
- Prey (2017)
- Deathloop (2021)
- Ghostwire: Tokyo (2022)
- Hi-Fi Rush (2023–2025)
- Redfall (2023)
- Starfield (2023)
- Indiana Jones and the Great Circle (2024)

== Conflicts with other developers ==
In 2001, Bethesda Softworks published Echelon in the United States, a video game developed by the Russian development studio Madia. Madia stated that Bethesda did not pay for boxed sales of the game, as was allegedly specified in the contract. The developers at Madia wrote an open letter to Bethesda in which they have detailed the affair, but Bethesda refused to pay. In the end Madia decided not to take it to court. Pete Hines, VP of PR at Bethesda, stated that Madia presented misleading allegations about Bethesda's role as publisher of Echelon in North America and that Bethesda had no contractual obligations to Madia.

Bethesda Softworks and ZeniMax Media have been accused of attempting a hostile acquisition of Human Head Studios, as well as a successful hostile acquisition of Arkane Studios before that. According to a report from IGN, ZeniMax started purposefully failing Human Head's project milestones so that it would not get paid, allowing ZeniMax to buy the company at a reduced rate. They were accused of doing the same thing with Arkane Studios, although in Arkane's case, the studio gave in and allowed themselves to be bought. The failed hostile acquisition of Human Head Studios led to cancellation of Human Head's Prey 2, according to the report.

Bethesda also pressured developer No Matter Games to change the name of its game Prey for the Gods to Praey for the Gods, as Bethesda felt the initial title infringed upon the trademark of its own game, Prey. Pete Hines, who serves as Bethesda's VP of marketing, said Bethesda would have risked losing its Prey trademark if it had not requested the title change.

=== Lawsuits ===
In September 2009, Bethesda Softworks sued Interplay Entertainment over Fallout trademark infringement. After a lengthy legal battle the lawsuit was settled in January 2012, with Interplay receiving US$2 million while Bethesda Softworks gained the right to develop a Fallout massively multiplayer online game, as well as the rights to Fallout, Fallout 2 and Fallout Tactics: Brotherhood of Steel after December 31, 2013.

In September 2011, Bethesda's parent company, ZeniMax Media, filed a lawsuit against Mojang, claiming that Mojang's planned trademark of the title Scrolls infringed upon Bethesda's trademark of The Elder Scrolls series. On October 18, Markus Persson announced that Mojang had won the interim injunction, but that Bethesda still had the option to file an appeal. In March 2012, Mojang and Bethesda reached a settlement, in which Mojang would not trademark Scrolls, but Bethesda would not contest Mojang's naming of Scrolls, so long as it would not be a direct competitor against The Elder Scrolls.

In 2018, Bethesda Softworks sued Behaviour Interactive, the company responsible for developing Fallout Shelter, for appearing to copy the game's design onto a tie-in mobile game for the Westworld franchise. The issue was settled with undisclosed terms, allowing Bethesda to drop the lawsuit.
