= Thomas Bergersen discography =

This is the discography of Thomas J. Bergersen, a composer whose music has been used in trailers of Hollywood blockbusters such as Harry Potter and the Order of the Phoenix, Harry Potter and the Deathly Hallows – Part 1, Harry Potter and the Deathly Hallows – Part 2, Star Trek, Star Trek Into Darkness, Interstellar and many others.

== Discography ==
=== Volume 1 ===
Tracks	Year	Notes
Two Steps From Hell; From The Abyss; The Legend of Aramis; Battle Of Dark vs Light; Interceptors Duel; Rise Of Evil; Bloodlust; Spirit Of Death; Necromantics; Souls Feast; Dominius; Dawn Of War; Black Winged Messenger; Lord Of Chaos; Temple Of Damnation; Cursed!; Catch 666; Horrors And Enchantments; Evil Supremacy; Exodus; Crimson Death; Fatespinner Drums; Two Steps From Heaven; Fireflies; Return To Base; Captain Universe; Battle At Sea; Chronicles Of A Hero; Adventures Of Enchantment; Breath Of Cold Air; Prophecies; Undying Faith; Guns And Oil; Trafficking; Wind Queen; Child's Play; The Truth Unravels; Heavenly Lights; Eternal Love	2006	First album, featuring various genres (Two Steps from Hell industry release)

=== Shadows and Nightmares ===
Tracks	Year	Notes
Doomsday; She Rises; Ritual of Resurrection; Nocturnal Prey; Evil! (part 1); Evil! (part 2); Ghost Town; Ghostly Presence; Demonic Procession; Come What May; Betrayed; Face of Dhomor Devah; Tick Tock Goes the Clock; Awakening the Beast; Inhuman Growth; Mountains of Madness; Etergheros Charghela; Bottomless Pit of Torment; Eyes Wide Open; Loch Ness; Discovery of Land; 20000 Tons of TNT; The Return of Life; Approaching Tsunami; Unholy Requiem; Cemetery Waltz	2006	Horror genre album (Two Steps from Hell industry release)

=== Dynasty ===
Tracks	Year	Notes
Armada; Elementum; Tyrianis; Heaven & Earth; Blast The Gates; King's Legion; Flameheart; Dragon Rider; Spirit Of Champions; Black Assassin; The Vendetta Conspiracy; Chariots Of Blood; Chopperhead; Kingdom Skies; Timebomb; Instruments Of War; Web Of Lies; The Brave & Mighty; Deep Voyage; Glory & Honor; Red Army; Magika; The Truth Unravels II; Love & Loss; Sun Goddess; Procession; Epilogue	2007	Epic genre album (Two Steps from Hell industry release)

=== All Drums Go To Hell ===
Tracks	Year	Notes
Barrage Of Noise; Carnival From Hell; Code Of Honor; Death Came Early That Year; Fists Of Steel; Freedom Army; Guerilla Raid; Hellraiser Brigade; Industrial Mayhem; Norwegian Devil; Nuclear Meltdown; Raging Horde; Shoot To Kill; Sleepwalker; Sudden Strike; Tagged Rendezvous; Wave Of Death; Skull Crusher; Toxic Rain; Chasing The Dragon; Diabolic Clockwork; Images Of Horror; Border Patrol; Jungle Fever; Lord Of Two Lands; Operation Sandstorm; Zoologic Stampede	2007	Heavily percussion-oriented album (Two Steps from Hell industry release)

=== Nemesis ===
Tracks	Year	Notes
Dark Ages; Nemesis; Clash of Empires; Atlantis; Army of Justice; Tristan; Road To Revelation; God of Lightning; Sons of War; The Immortals; Wrath of Sea; Red Omen; Sky Titans; Hunter's Moon; Moving Mountains; Eternal Sorrow; Fountain of Life; Enigmatic Soul; Dominion Heart; False King (co-composed with Nick Phoenix); Friendship To Last	2007	Epic genre album (Two Steps from Hell industry release)

=== Pathogen ===
Tracks	Year	Notes
Iron Soul; False King (Rock) (co-composed with Nick Phoenix)	2007	Electro-metal album (Two Steps from Hell industry release)

=== Dreams & Imaginations ===
Tracks	Year	Notes
Secrets Of The Mind; Color The Sky; Transfiguration; Moving Shadows; Through Devil's Eyes; Hello World; Parfait Amour; Aurora Boralis; Sun Gazer; Wings; Gentle Breeze; Mind Tricks; Scent Of A Woman; Flying; Fate Of The Deserted; African Sunset; Rapid Eye Movement; Peace of Mind; Water Reflections; Bed of Roses; Lux Aeterna; Lonesome Dove; Solitude; Weightless; Wake of Desolation; Entombed; I See The Future; Moonshine; Allure; Hidden Beauty; Forsaken; New Dawn; Celebrate Life; Earthgirl; Northern Pastures; A Small Step For Mankind; Eria; Tears; Sleepless; Into Unknown Space; Forever In My Dreams; Sweet May; Great Spirits; Remembrance; Setting Sail; Drifting Thoughts; Touched By Her Hand; Ancient Cities; Frozen Moment; Life Is Beautiful; Meant To Be; From The Heart Of Paris; Reset Life; A Thousand Miles Apart; Missed You; Painted By Numbers; Goodbye For Now; Memories; Dreams & Imaginations; It Tells A Story; El Mexicano; Once Upon A Time; It's The Season For Love; Forgotten Realms; Clair Voyant; River Of Tears; Broken Hearts; A Hero's Return; Another Life; Forgotten September; Lament For The Lonely; Chill Of The Night; Silent Prayer; Torches; Endless Night; Susanna's Mourning; Falling; Snowfall; Perfect Assassination; Hell's Gate; Electric People; Mulholland Drive; Intoxication; Visions; Mmm Chicken!; Possessed Gramophone	2008	New Age album (Two Steps from Hell industry release)

=== Legend ===
Tracks	Year	Notes
Adventure of a Lifetime; Calamity; Call to Arms; Crusaders; Divine Intervention; Fields of Blood; Freedom Fighters; Heart of Courage; Hypnotica; Perchance to Dream; Protectors of the Earth; Red Carpets; Undying Love; Voyager; Fallout; Fateful Night; Perilous Journey; Smell of Victory	2008	Epic genre album (Two Steps from Hell industry release)

=== Ashes ===
Tracks	Year	Notes
Burn Baby; Deck the Halls with Blood; Executive Decision; Exhumed; Kiss of Night; London 1920; Moving Shadows II; Severe Medication; Something Wicked Lurks; Surrounding The Church; Time is Fleeting; Twisted Children	2008	Horror genre album (Two Steps from Hell industry release)

=== The Devil Wears Nada ===
Tracks	Year	Notes
American Soldier; Broommaker's Assistant; Clock Tower Parade; Follow That Kid; Levitating Lilimongers; Liar Liar Pants on Fire; Love Doctor; Monkey Business; My Little Friend Max; Professor Pumplestickle; Say Yes; Sky Brigade; Smirnoff; Sunrise; The Whistleblower; To The Tower; Toys Come Alive; Waltz of the Willows; We Can Fly; Will We Ever Meet Again	2009	Mostly light and humorous album (Two Steps from Hell industry release)

=== Power of Darkness ===
Tracks	Year	Notes
Atlas; Black Blade; Earth Rising; Gravitation; Invincible; Jump!; Power Of Darkness; What's Happening To Me; 72 Virgins; Decimator; Freefall; He Who Brings The Night; Ironheart; Norwegian Pirate; Titan Dune	2010	Epic genre album (Two Steps from Hell industry release)

=== Invincible ===
Tracks	Year	Notes
Heart of Courage; Moving Mountains; Freedom Fighters; Enigmatic Soul; Black Blade; Invincible; False King (With Nick); Hypnotica; Protectors of the Earth; Undying Love; Tristan; To Glory	2010	First public album (Two Steps from Hell)

=== The Human Experience (Music from the Motion Picture) ===
Tracks	Year	Notes
The Human Experience - Overture; The Human Experience - Theme; Exaltation; The Hidden Rainforest; A Surprise Meeting; Emergence	2011	Original motion picture score

=== Illumina ===
Tracks	Year	Notes
Could’ve Been; I Love You Forever; Corruption; Organic Multiplication; Lost in Las Vegas; Down; Global Waste; Timelapse; Hot Cargo; R.E.M.; Love Suspended; Shipwrecked; She Sees The Future; A Hole In The Sun; Threnody; Painted World; Sidyana; Enigma; Paper Planes; Shaken, Not Stirred; Science; You Walk This Earth Alone; Cloud Maker; Walking On Air; You Will Count Your Dead; Bourne In The Future; Eyes Closing	2011	New Age album (Two Steps from Hell industry release)

=== Illusions ===
Tracks	Year	Notes
Aura; Starvation; Dreammaker; Hurt; Ocean Princess; Gift of Life; Rada; A Place in Heaven; Merchant Prince; Promise; Femme Fatale; Homecoming; Immortal; Remember Me; Sonera; Reborn; Age of Gods; Illusions; Soulseeker	2011	First Thomas Bergersen solo album

=== Archangel ===
Tracks	Year	Notes
Archangel; United We Stand – Divided We Fall; Love & Loss; Nero; Atlantis; Strength of a Thousand Men; Magic of Love; Norwegian Pirate; Dragon Rider; Titan Dune; Army of Justice; He Who Brings The Night; What's Happening to Me; Friendship to Last	2011	Compilation of popular tracks (Two Steps from Hell)

=== Nero ===
Tracks	Year	Notes
United We Stand – Divided We Fall; Archangel; Strength of a Thousand Men; Magic of Love; Nero; Salvation; Five Finger Fillet; To Glory; Starfall; Undefeated; Birth of a Hero; Ride To Victory; Casablanca; It Lives!; The Devil Plays a Smoking Trumpet; Tower of Mischief; My Freedom; Allegro Agitato	2011	Epic genre album (Two Steps from Hell industry release)

=== Two Steps From Heaven (Heaven Anthology) ===
Tracks	Year	Notes
Reach for the Skies; Motherland; Strength of an Empire; Benedictus; Men of Honor; Welcome to Fantasia; Liberty Rising; Beyond the Horizon; Cassandra; Spirit of Moravia; Forever More; She's a Superhero; Heart; Into the Moonlight; Neptune's Secret; Hope; Men of Honor; An Awfully Big Adventure; Gloria	2012	Pet project of Thomas Bergersen (Two Steps from Hell industry release)

=== SkyWorld ===
Tracks	Year	Notes
All is Hell that Ends Well; SkyWorld; El Dorado; All the Kings Horses; Winterspell; Blackheart; Dark Ages; For The Win; Sun & Moon; Blizzard; Breathe; Children from the War [Industry version]; Requiem for Destruction [Industry version]; The Colonel [Industry version]	2012	First public album with mostly all-new tracks (Two Steps from Hell)

=== Burn ===
Tracks	Year	Notes
Iron Soul (Dubstep Remix); Tyrianis (Dubstep Remix); Strength of a Thousand Men (Dubstep Remix); All Is Hell That Ends Well (Dubstep Remix); Winterspell (Dubstep Remix); El Dorado (Dubstep Remix); For the Win (Dance Remix); Not Your Soul	2012	Dubstep remix album (Two Steps from Hell industry release)

=== Classics Volume One ===
Tracks	Year	Notes
Nemesis; Armada; Jump!; Sons of War; Strength of an Empire; Eternal Sorrow; Birth of a Hero; Sky Titans; Earth Rising; Ironheart; Clair Voyant; Spirit of Moravia	2013	Compilation Album (Two Steps from Hell)

=== Miracles ===
Tracks	Year	Notes
Miracles; Eria; Compass; Sun Gazer; Eyes Closing; Fountain of Life; Stay; Men of Honor; My Freedom; Perfect Love; Lux Aeterna; I Love You Forever; Color the Sky; Forever in My Dreams; Breath of Cold Air; Heart; Wind Queen; Northern Pastures; Science; Lost in Las Vegas; Compass Bonus Track	2014	Epic drama/emotional album (Two Steps from Hell)

=== Colin Frake on Fire Mountain ===
Tracks	Year	Notes
Colin Frake; Prologue; Legend of Velkee; Fire Mountain; Gore's Theme; Light Comes Before Dark; He's the Giant; Hadrian's Demon; Talia's Theme; Reanne	2014	Soundtrack for E-book (Two Steps from Hell)

=== Open Conspiracy ===
Tracks	Year	Notes
President's Assassination; Baghdad Underground	2014	Electronic Hybrid album (Two Steps from Hell industry release)

=== Amaria ===
Tracks	Year	Notes
Welcome to Amaria; A Blanket of Snow; New Machine; Riders; More than Friends; Magic Entrance; Vengeance; Chase the Light; Companions; Adventures of Gillock; Machine Dreams	2014	New Age/Epic drama (Two Steps from Hell industry release)

=== Sun ===
Tracks	Year	Notes
Before Time; Creation of Earth; Sun; Cry; Our Destiny; New Life; Final Frontier; Starchild; Colors of Love; Cassandra; Always Mine; Dragonland; Fearless; Empire of Angels; Two Hearts; In Paradisum	2014	Second Thomas Bergersen solo album

=== Battlecry ===
Tracks	Year	Notes
None Shall Live; Victory; Rise Above; Never Back Down; Cannon in D Minor; Stronger Faster Braver; Last of the Light; Release Me; Amaria; Flight of the Silverbird; Unforgiven; No Honor in Blood; Star Sky; Star Sky (Instrumental)	2015	First public album released on two discs (Two Steps from Hell)

=== Classics Volume Two ===
Tracks	Year	Notes
Heaven & Earth; Atlas; Starfall; Salvation; Casablanca; Fateful Night; Flameheart; Magika; The Immortals; Ride to Victory; The Colonel; Undefeated; Riders; Adventure of a Lifetime; Clock Tower Parade	2015	Compilation Album (Two Steps from Hell)

=== Vanquish ===
Tracks	Year	Notes
Pegasus; New World Order; Enchantress; His Brightest Star Was You; Evergreen; Stallion; High C's; Dangerous; Inferni	2016	Publicly Released Album w/ New Compositions (Two Steps From Hell)

=== Unleashed ===
Tracks	Year	Notes
Unleashed; Impossible; Wild Heart; Run Free; Never Give Up on Your Dreams; Secret Melody; Molto Piratissimo; Snow Angels; Westward; See Me Fight	2017	Publicly Released Album w/ New Compositions (Two Steps From Hell)

=== American Dream ===
Tracks	Year	Notes
American Dream (Continuous Mix); Prologue; Embarking & Setting Sail; Anticipation & Excitement; All Hands on Deck; Leisure Time; The Ballroom; Pay Your Dues; A Great Expanse; A Storm Is Brewing; Taking The Helm; Missing Home; An American Vessel; Open Seas; Whales; Quien Eres Tu; The American Dream; Land of the Free; Home of the Brave	2018	First orchestral suite

=== Dragon ===
Tracks	Year	Notes
Unbreakable; Bravestone; Emerald Princess; Race to Durango; Dragonwing; Skulls & Trombones; Letters to God; Snowball Fight; Believe	2019	Publicly Released Album w/ New Compositions (Two Steps From Hell)

=== Seven ===
Tracks	Year	Notes
Deliverance; Big Life; Eyes Wider; You Were My Forever; The Stars Are You and Me; Wither All Life and Love; Return to Sender	2019	First hybrid symphony

=== Neon Nights ===
Tracks	Year	Notes
Electro Grid; Vector Hunter; As We Come Alive; Monsters From Planet Awesome; Neon Nights; Summer of 84; Arcade Master; Midnight Love; Turbo Squad; Lamborghini Highway; Tokyo Showdown Mania; LA Electric; Samantha Foxx	2020	Synthwave/Retro-sci-fi album (Two Steps from Hell industry release)

=== Daybreak ===
Tracks	Year	Notes
Daybreak; Gone in the Morning; War and Victory; Escaping; All For One; A Lonely Hero; The Greatest Ride; Enchanted Kingdom; We Were Young; Dreams of a Star; Far and Beyond; Torn Heart; Don't Let Go	2020	Epic drama/emotional album (Two Steps from Hell industry release)

=== Myth ===
Tracks	Year	Notes
Intro; Phantom; Last One Standing; Amethyst Prince; Twin Lights; Away With Your Fairies; Hercules; Inventing the Portal; Pwnd; Shiver Me Timpanis; Dragonborn; Myth; Arcade Master	2022	Publicly released album (Two Steps From Hell)

=== Humanity ===
Humanity

Studio album series by Thomas Bergersen
- Released: 1 July 2020 – present
- Length: 5:40:00 (after 5 of 7 albums)
- Label: Nemesis Productions

Thomas Bergersen chronology
Sun (2014)	Humanity (2020–)

Humanity is an ongoing series of seven albums created by Norwegian composer Thomas J. Bergersen, of Two Steps from Hell fame; his third through ninth solo studio albums, described as an "evolution" of the preceding Illusions (2011) and Sun (2014).

The seven "chapters" each relate musically to a different theme regarding the "ranges of human emotion and history". Bergersen began work on the series in 2014. After six years of development, the first chapter was released in July 2020. The subsequent albums have been released in intervals of several months. Six of the seven chapters have been released as of July 2026.

The series artwork was designed by Sam Hayles.

==== Chapter I ====
The first album, Chapter I, was released on 1 July 2020. Its theme is freedom.

Track listing

No.	Title	Length
1.	"Eleutheria"	2:00
2.	"We Are One"	1:49
3.	"Beautiful People" (feat. Merethe Soltvedt)	4:57
4.	"Wings"	4:07
5.	"L'Appel Du Vide" (feat. Merethe Soltvedt and Claudio Pietronik)	5:27
6.	"Orbital" (feat. Cinda M)	4:21
7.	"Mountain Call"	5:44
8.	"Humanity" (feat. Audrey Callahan)	10:49

Alternative mixes
No.	Title	Length
9.	"Beautiful People (EDM Mashup)"	8:31
10.	"Beautiful People (No Vocals)"	6:42
11.	"Wings (No Vocals)"	4:08
12.	"Mountain Call (No Vocals)"	5:46
13.	"Humanity (No Vocals)"	10:42
Total length:		1:15:01

==== Chapter II ====
The second album, Chapter II, was released on 11 November 2020. Its theme is purpose.

Track listing

No.	Title	Length
1.	"Mир"	3:08
2.	"Crystallize"	5:25
3.	"We Are Legends"	13:12
4.	"Your Imagination" (feat. Audrey Karrasch)	4:35
5.	"The Stars Are Coming Home"	8:42
6.	"Take Me Back"	2:21
7.	"Innocence"	5:03
8.	"Fairytale"	6:53
9.	"Materialize"	6:21
10.	"Vaporize" (feat. Kimera Morrell)	4:37

Alternative mixes
No.	Title	Length
11.	"We Are Legends (Edit)"	7:24
12.	"The Stars Are Coming Home (Edit)"	5:17
Total length:		1:12:58

==== Chapter III ====
The third album, Chapter III, was released on 6 May 2021. Its theme is love.

Track listing

No.	Title	Length
1.	"Sparks"	4:05
2.	"Red" (feat. Merethe Soltvedt)	5:43
3.	"First Kiss"	2:17
4.	"Butterflies"	3:43
5.	"You Are My Home"	3:18
6.	"Magic" (feat. Kimera Morrell)	3:27
7.	"Born To Dream"	3:38
8.	"Little Star" (feat. Audrey Karrasch)	4:33
9.	"Growing Old Together"	3:10
10.	"Until The Lights Go Out"	3:08
11.	"It Was A Life Worth Living"	3:13
12.	"Love Suite"	7:25
13.	"You" (feat. Audrey Karrasch)	3:56
14.	"Sunshower"	10:17
Total length:		1:01:53

==== Chapter IV ====
The fourth album, Chapter IV, was released on 2 September 2021. Its theme is Planet Earth.

Track listing

No.	Title	Length
1.	"Space For Rent"	5:08
2.	"Apollo"	4:08
3.	"Rocket To The Moon"	3:31
4.	"Cruising In Space" (feat. Merethe Soltvedt)	7:45
5.	"Made Of Air"	4:07
6.	"One Million Voices"	8:53
7.	"Made of Water"	5:49
8.	"Made of Earth"	3:25
9.	"Please Don't Go"	3:07
10.	"Made of Fire"	5:40
11.	"Dear Mr. Alien"	5:39
12.	"Rocket To The Moon (Reprise)"	3:36
13.	"So Small"	5:38
Total length:		1:06:26

==== Songs for Ukraine EP ====
Between the release of chapters IV and V, Bergersen released an additional three songs in March 2022. Composed in reaction to the 2022 Russian invasion of Ukraine, the EP, entitled Songs for Ukraine, was released as part of the Humanity series but not as part of the main body of work, rather as an addendum. All proceeds from the sales were donated to UNICEF.

Track listing

No.	Title	Length
1.	"Wings for Ukraine"	5:15
2.	"Shield of Love"	3:03
3.	"Lament for our Children" (feat. Kate St. Pierre)	3:40
Total length:		0:11:58

==== Chapter V ====
The fifth album, Chapter V, was released on 24 April 2023. Its theme is adventure.

Track listing

No.	Title	Length
1.	"Aventura"	2:59
2.	"Iron Will"	5:03
3.	"Memoria" (feat. Merethe Soltvedt)	4:17
4.	"Reflections of You"	3:40
5.	"Night Queen" (feat. Merethe Soltvedt)	3:44
6.	"Heroica"	4:24
7.	"Dreamgarden"	3:16
8.	"Xunia"	5:18
9.	"Kingmaker"	5:44
10.	"Away With Your Fairies (Humanity Version)"	5:07
11.	"One Last Day" (feat. Merethe Soltvedt)	4:33
12.	"Aventura Suite"	10:52
13.	"One Last Day (Instrumental)"	4:33
Total length:		1:03:37

==== Chapter VI ====
Released on July 28th, 2026. Its theme is the dark side of humanity.

No.	Title	Length
1.	"Hope"	2:46
2.	"Destruction of the Earth"	5:07
3.	"Empire of Evil"	3:37
4.	"Maluk"	2:26
5.	"Burn It Down"	5:06
6.	"Unchained"	3:56
7.	"Immortalized" (feat. Kimera Morrell)	4:11
8.	"Toccata In G-Minor" (feat. Claudio Pietronik)	3:35
9.	"Creator of Worlds"	6:54
10.	"Death Rings The Doorbell of All"	5:44
11.	"For The Fallen"	5:25
12.	"Hope Suite" (feat. Kimera Morrell)	7:33
13.	"Evigt ejes kun det Tabte"	3:58
Total length:		1:00:18

==== Chapter VII ====
Future release. Details TBA.

==== Critical reception ====
IFMCA-associated reviews website, MundoBSO, rated chapters I and II seven out of ten stars each.

==== Charts ====
US charts key:
- US CLX – US Classical Crossover Albums (Billboard)
- UK Down. – UK Album Downloads (OCC)

Chapter	US CLX	UK Down.
I	3	—
II	4	—
III	—	—
IV	4	83
V	3	37
"—" denotes releases that did not chart.

=== A Christmas Carol ===
Tracks	Year	Notes
A Christmas Carol; Ebenezer Scrooge; The Ghost of Christmas Past; The Ghost of Christmas Present; The Ghost of Christmas Yet to Come; Scrooge's Transformation; A Christmas Carol (Continuous Suite)	2024	Second orchestral suite

=== Standalone tracks ===
Songs that did not initially appear on any album release and are available as either commercial singles or as free downloads.

- Remember September (2007) — A trance-genre single released with Norwegian EDM artist Boom Jinx. Later reworked for the Two Steps from Hell track Forgotten September.
- Where Are You (2011) — Pop-trance with a unique style. Lyrics performed by Thomas Bergersen.
- Hymn to Life (2012) — A track released on the occasion of Thomas's birthday. Later performed in a Czech concert as "Hymnus Vitae Dedicatus."
- The Hero in Your Heart (2013) — A single made to raise money to help the victims of the Typhoon Haiyan in the Philippines. Lyrics written and performed by Merethe Soltvedt.
- That's A Wrap (2014) — A dark, adventurous orchestral ten-minute song created entirely with Thomas's proprietary sample library.
- Autumn Love (2014) — An emotional, piano-driven track in a similar style to Dreams and Imaginations.
- Into Darkness (2014) — A nine-minute mix of neo-orchestral and EDM club style. Lyrics performed by Thomas Bergersen.
- Children of the Sun (2015) — Original vocal version of "None Shall Live" from the Battlecry album. Lyrics performed by Merethe Soltvedt.
- You Are Light (2018) — A new ethereal 5-minute track featuring the vocals of Felicia Farerre.
- Imagine (2018) — A new song by Thomas Bergersen.
- In Orbit (2018) — A new epic rock song by Thomas Bergersen featuring the vocals of Cinda M. Later reworked into Orbital in Humanity - Chapter I.
- Brightest Smile (2018) — Another ethereal composition by Thomas Bergersen featuring the vocals of Natalie Major.
- Catch Me (2019) — A 7-minute epic pop composition by Thomas Bergersen featuring the vocals of Sonna.
- Next to You (2019) — A 3-minute uplifting track by Thomas Bergersen featuring once again the vocals of Sonna.
- One Million Voices (2019) — A 9-minute track by Thomas Bergersen. Later released in Humanity - Chapter IV.
- Little Star (2019) — A track released during the holiday season. Thomas says he wrote this song "to commemorate those who were dear to us who have since passed, but whose spirits live on in our memory". Lyrics performed by Audrey Karrasch. This track was later included in Humanity - Chapter III.
- So Small (2020) — Later included in Humanity - Chapter IV.
- Wings for Ukraine (2022) — Emotional choral-driven work released to showcase support for Ukraine during the 2022 Russian invasion. Released as a single under the Humanity label.
- Am I Real (2023) — A single released with Boom Jinx.
