= Capellen Music Production =

- Industry: Music production
- Founder: Petr Pololanik
- Website: capellen.cz

Capellen Music Production (CMP) is a music production company. It specializes in film and pop symphony recordings, live concerts and other symphony related services (i.e. music preparation, orchestration, symphonic arrangements, etc.).

Since 2006, CMP uses its specific studio formations, Capellen Orchestra and Capellen Choir.

To date, CMP has produced music for many film and record companies (e.g. Warner Music, EMI Classics, Disney/Pixar, Maxis/Electronic Arts, Magic Circle Music, Java Music Productions...), trailer libraries (Two Steps From Hell, Position Music, audiomachine, Videohelper, FringeElements, Switch, XRayDog, Eternal Eclipse...), as well as sample developers (Garritan, Sonokinetic, 8dio, Performance Samples, EWQL, ...).

Founder and President of Capellen Music Production is Czech conductor, orchestrator and music producer, Petr Pololanik.

== Discography ==
- Beijing Rocks (2001)
- Star Runner (2003)
- The Dark Secret (2004)
- Symphony of Enchanted Lands II – The Dark Secret (2004)
- Triumph or Agony (2006)
- Nobles (2005)
- Sons of Odin (2006)
- Michal David: Love Songs (2006)
- Dynasty (2007)
- Angelique (2007)
- Legend (2008)
- Storm Rider Clash of the Evils (2008)
- The Devil Wears Nada (2009)
- Three Kingdoms: Resurrection of the Dragon (2009)
- Power of Darkness (2010)
- Invincible (2010)
- Echoes of the Rainbow (2010)
- 14 Blades OST (2010)
- The Tudors OST (2010)
- The Pillars of the Earth OST (TV miniseries) (2010)
- The Stool Pigeon (film) (2010)
- The Lost Bladesman OST (2011)
- Vendetta (2011)
- The Human Experience OST (2011)
- Illusions (2011)
- Nero (2011)
- Archangel (Two Steps From Hell) (2012)
- Gitano (2012)
- Tiara Concerto (2012)
- Elysium (2012)
- Awakenings (audiomachine) (2012)
- Skyworld (2012)
- Tree of Life (audiomachine) (2013)
- Collossical (Videohelper) (2013)
- Millenium (Brand-X Music) (2013)
- Company Of Heroes 2 (2013)
- Two Steps From Hell Classics Volume 1 (2013)
- Sun (2014)
- Battlecry (2015)
- Vanquish (2016)

== Filmography ==
- Beijing Rocks (2001)
- Star Runner (2003)
- Traces of a Dragon (2003)
- The Day the Earth Shook - The Absolute Power (2006)
- Angelique (2007)
- Storm Rider Clash of the Evils (2008)
- The Human Experience (2008)
- The Sniper (2009 film) (2009)
- Three Kingdoms: Resurrection of the Dragon (2009)
- The Road Less Travelled (2010)
- Fire of Conscience (2010)
- Future X-Cops (2010)
- 14 Blades (2010)
- The Tudors (2010)
- The Pillars of the Earth (TV miniseries) (2010)
- The Stool Pigeon (film) (2010)
- The Lost Bladesman (2011)
- Lee's Adventure (2011)
- White Vengeance (2011)
- The Four (2012)
- Unbeatable (2013)

== Live performances ==
- Demons, Dragons And Warriors Tour (2005)
- Demons, Dragons And Warriors World Tour (2007)
- Elysium - Xmas Fantasy (2012–13)
- Two Steps From Hell In Concert Live (2013)

== Sample and sound libraries ==
- Garritan Personal Orchestra (2003)
- Garritan World Instruments (2010)
- Tutti (2011)
- Vivace (2012)
- DaCapo (2012)
- Garritan Pipe Organ (2012)
- Minimal (2013)
