= Petr Pololáník =

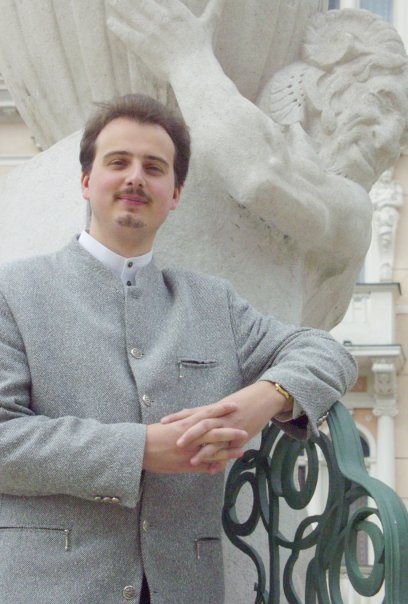
- Petr Pololáník

Background information
- Born: April 24, 1973 (age 53)
- Origin: Brno, Czech Republic
- Genres: Symphonic music
- Occupations: Conductor, Orchestrator, Music Producer
- Instruments: Violin, Piano, Keyboard
- Years active: 1991 – present
- Website: Official website

Petr Pololáník (born April 24, 1973) is a Czech conductor, orchestrator and music producer. His father Zdeněk Pololáník belongs to foremost Czech composers.

Petr studied both violin, piano and conducting; in 1996, he earned his Master of Arts in conducting at the Janacek Academy of Music and Performing Arts in Brno.

Since 1996, Petr has been teaching at the Church Conservatory in Kroměříž, the Film School in Zlín and at the International Conductors Workshops in Kroměříž. In 2001, he became the Executive and artistic director of the Karlovy Vary Symphony Orchestra, one of the oldest symphony orchestras in Europe.

As a conductor, he has cooperated with leading orchestras, choirs and opera houses in Czech and abroad, and made several dozens of concert appearances and recordings for film, TV, radio, world known soloists and groups, production companies as well as sample libraries.

He is the founder and President of Capellen Music Production and conductor & orchestrator of the industry renowned Capellen Orchestra & Choir.

== Discography ==
- Janacek: Works for Strings (1996); conductor
- Bohuslav Martinu: Cello Concertos (1999); conductor
- Gary Garritan: Qualities (2000); conductor, orchestrator
- Andrew B. Waggoner: Legacy (2001); conductor
- Beijing Rocks (2001); conductor, orchestrator
- Becoming Sammi (2002); conductor
- Womyn's Work (2003); conductor
- Star Runner (2003); conductor, orchestrator
- Gary Daverne: Gallipoli (2004); conductor
- The Dark Secret (2004); conductor, orchestrator
- Symphony of Enchanted Lands II – The Dark Secret (2004); conductor, orchestrator
- Erden Bilgen Plays Gallipoli (2004); conductor
- Eberhard Boettcher: Per Orchestra (2005); conductor
- Timothy J. Brown: Infinity (2005); conductor
- Nobles (2005); composer, arranger
- Triumph or Agony (2006); conductor, orchestrator
- Becoming Sammi + My Left Eye Sees Ghosts (2006); conductor
- Sons of Odin (2006); conductor, orchestrator
- Michal David: Love Songs (2006); arranger, music producer
- Dynasty (2007); conductor, orchestrator
- Angelique (2007); arranger, music producer
- Completely yours...Sammi (2006); conductor
- Florencio Asenjo: Angels Dancing On A Pin (2007); score supervisor, sound editor
- Legend (2008); conductor, orchestrator
- Storm Rider Clash of the Evils (2008); conductor, orchestrator
- The Devil Wears Nada (2009); conductor, orchestrator
- Three Kingdoms: Resurrection of the Dragon (2009); conductor, orchestrator
- Power of Darkness (2010); conductor, orchestrator
- Invincible (2010); conductor, orchestrator
- Echoes of the Rainbow (2010); conductor, orchestrator
- The Stool Pigeon (film) (2010); conductor, orchestrator
- Vendetta (2011); conductor, orchestrator
- The Human Experience (2011); conductor, orchestrator
- Illusions (2011); conductor, orchestrator
- Nero (2011); conductor, orchestrator
- White Vengeance (2011); conductor, orchestrator
- Two Steps From Heaven (2012); conductor, orchestrator
- Elysium (2012); conductor, orchestrator
- Archangel (2012); conductor, orchestrator
- SkyWorld (2012); conductor, orchestrator
- Awakenings (2012); conductor, orchestrator
- Gitano (2012); conductor

== Filmography ==
- Return to foreign country (1994); score reader
- Jack the rubber (1998); composer
- Scaramouche (1923/2000); orchestrator
- Beijing Rocks (2001); conductor, orchestrator
- Star Runner (2003); conductor, orchestrator
- Traces of a Dragon (2003); conductor, orchestrator
- The Day the Earth Shook - The Absolute Power (2006); conductor
- Angelique (2007); arranger, music producer
- Storm Rider Clash of the Evils (2008); conductor, orchestrator
- The Human Experience (2008); conductor, orchestrator
- The Sniper (2009 film) (2009); conductor, orchestrator
- Three Kingdoms: Resurrection of the Dragon (2009); conductor, orchestrator
- The Road Less Travelled (2010); conductor, orchestrator
- Fire of Conscience (2010); conductor, orchestrator
- Future X-Cops (2010); conductor, orchestrator
- 14 Blades (2010); conductor, orchestrator
- The Tudors (2010); conductor, orchestrator
- The Pillars of the Earth (TV miniseries) (2010); conductor, orchestrator
- The Stool Pigeon (film) (2010); conductor, orchestrator
- The Lost Bladesman (2011); conductor, orchestrator
- Lee's Adventure (2011); conductor, orchestrator
- White Vengeance (2011); conductor, orchestrator
- The Four (film) (2012); conductor, orchestrator
- Prophecy (2012); conductor, orchestrator

== Tour performances ==
- Meeting of Two Worlds (2002); arranger, conductor
- Meeting of Two Worlds II. (2004); arranger, conductor
- Demons, Dragons And Warriors Tour (2005); conductor
- Demons, Dragons And Warriors World Tour (2007); conductor
- Music from the Silver Screen (2009–10); arranger, conductor
- Elysium - The Xmas Fantasy (2012); arranger, conductor, producer
- Two Steps From Hell in Concert Live (2013); orchestrator, conductor

== Other projects ==
- The Great Theatre of the World (theatre production; 1995); composer, music producer
- Misantrop (theatre production; 1997); composer
- Crime and Punishment (theatre production; 1997); arranger; music producer
- The Eagle with Two Heads (theatre production; 1998); arranger; music producer
- The Goaty Sing (theatre production; 1998); arranger; music producer
- Passion Games (theatre production; 2000); arranger; music producer
- The Merchant of Venice (theatre production; 2000); arranger; music producer
- Garritan Personal Orchestra (sample library; 2003-); recording producer
- SimCity 4: Rush Hour (computer game, 2004); conductor
- Garritan World Instruments (sample library; 2010); recording producer
- Tutti (orchestral FX library; 2011); conductor, consultant, contractor
- Vivace (orchestral FX library; 2011); conductor, consultant, contractor
- Garritan Classic Pipe Organs (sample library; 2012); consultant, recording producer
- DaCapo (sample library; 2012); conductor, consultant, contractor
- Tiara Concerto (online game, 2012); conductor, orchestrator
- Transformers: Fall of Cybertron (computer game, 2012); conductor, orchestrator
- Company Of Heroes 2 (computer game, 2012); conductor, orchestrator
- Minimal (sample library; 2013); conductor, consultant, contractor
