= Vanquish =

Vanquish may refer to:

- Aston Martin Vanquish, a grand tourer automobile
- Vanquish, a brand name formulation of dicamba pesticide
- Vanquish (analgesic), a brand of over-the-counter analgesic
- Vanquish (video game), a 2010 third-person shooter video game
- Vanquish (album), a 2016 album by Two Steps from Hell
- Vanquish (film), a 2021 film starring Morgan Freeman
