= Capellen Orchestra =

- Orchestra
- The orchestra during recording
- Founded: 2006
- Location: Czech Republic
- Website: www.capellen.cz

Capellen Orchestra is a custom sized studio symphony (100+), utilizing selected musicians from the Czech Republic, Slovakia, Austria and Hungary, formed by and exclusively used by Capellen Music Production. In 2011, Capellen Orchestra & Choir were nominated for the award for best performance of Jo Blankenburg "Satorius" by the Hollywood Music in Media.

== Discography ==
- Dynasty (2007)
- Legend (2008)
- Storm Rider Clash of the Evils (2008)
- The Devil Wears Nada (2009)
- Three Kingdoms: Resurrection of the Dragon (2009)
- Power of Darkness (2010)
- Invincible (2010)
- Echoes of the Rainbow OST (2010)
- The Tudors Season 4 OST (2010)
- The Pillars of the Earth (TV miniseries) OST (2010)
- The Stool Pigeon OST (film) (2010)
- 14 Blades OST (2010)
- Vendetta (2011)
- The Human Experience OST (2011)
- Illusions (2011)
- Nero (2011)
- SkyWorld (2012)
- Tiara Concerto Online OST (2013)
- Sun (2014)
- Battlecry (2015)
- Vanquish (2016)

== Filmography ==
- Storm Rider Clash of the Evils (2008)
- The Human Experience (2008)
- The Sniper (2009 film) (2009)
- Three Kingdoms: Resurrection of the Dragon (2009)
- The Road Less Travelled (2010)
- Fire of Conscience (2010)
- Future X-Cops (2010)
- 14 Blades (2010)
- The Tudors (2010)
- The Pillars of the Earth (TV miniseries) (2010)
- The Stool Pigeon (film) (2010)
- The Lost Bladesman (2010)
- Lee's Adventure (2011)
- White Vengeance (2011)
- The Four (2012)
- Unbeatable (2013)

== Video games ==
- Star Citizen
