= Vanquish (album) =

Studio album by Two Steps from Hell
- Released: December 2, 2016
- Length: 1:08:04
- Producer: Thomas Bergersen, Nick Phoenix

Two Steps from Hell chronology
Classics Volume Two (2015)	Vanquish (2016)	Unleashed (2017)

Vanquish is the ninth studio album by the group Two Steps from Hell, released on 2 December 2016. It consists of 17 tracks written by composers Thomas J. Bergersen and Nick Phoenix. The album is the first major public release to include no material from industry album releases. It was recorded live by Capellen Orchestra under the supervision of Petr Pololáník, and features vocal performances by Felicia Farerre, Asja Kadric, Jenifer Thigpen, and Linea Adamson.

The cover artwork and the sleeve are designed by Steven R. Gilmore. The album was made available to the industry via Extreme Music on January 4, 2017.

The album is dedicated to Phoenix's late son, Jack, who was killed in a hit and run incident a year before its release aged 15.

== Track listing ==
No.	Title	Writer(s)	Length
1.	"Fall of the Fountain World" (feat. Felicia Farerre & Asja Kadric)	Nick Phoenix	4:37
2.	"Pegasus" (feat. Felicia Farerre)	Thomas J. Bergersen	4:29
3.	"Vanquish" (feat. Felicia Farerre)	Nick Phoenix	3:15
4.	"New World Order"	Thomas J. Bergersen	3:21
5.	"Future Guardian" (feat. Felicia Farerre & Asja Kadric)	Nick Phoenix	4:13
6.	"Enchantress"	Thomas J. Bergersen	8:17
7.	"Final Kingdom" (feat. Felicia Farerre)	Nick Phoenix	2:33
8.	"His Brightest Star Was You" (feat. Felicia Farerre)	Thomas J. Bergersen	3:19
9.	"Siege" (feat. Felicia Farerre)	Nick Phoenix	4:15
10.	"Evergreen"	Thomas J. Bergersen	3:02
11.	"The Ring of Winter" (feat. Felicia Farerre & Asja Kadric)	Nick Phoenix	2:37
12.	"Stallion" (feat. Jenifer Thigpen)	Thomas J. Bergersen	4:00
13.	"Turin" (feat. Felicia Farerre & Asja Kadric)	Nick Phoenix	3:55
14.	"High C’s"	Thomas J. Bergersen	5:39
15.	"Forge" (feat. Felicia Farerre & Asja Kadric)	Nick Phoenix	4:10
16.	"Dangerous" (feat. Linea Adamson)	Thomas J. Bergersen	3:56
17.	"Inferni"	Thomas J. Bergersen	2:21

== Critical reception ==
Clothilde Lebrun of Trailer Music News was favourable, describing the album as "epic and bombastic at times, inspiring and sweeping at others", albeit not having "the dramatic intensity that some previous industry releases had". Considering the latter, she said it offers "a more diverse listening experience, with very elaborate compositions by Nick Phoenix and more experimental ones by Thomas Bergersen", concluding, "Vanquish is a welcome sequel" to SkyWorld and Battlecry.

The review by Brigid Ehrmantraut published in The Princeton LP was also favourable. She claimed the album was "finessed in comparison with some of the group’s earlier releases". She was most critical of the album's lyrical tracks, calling them an "iffier proposition" compared to tracks featuring choirs. Overall she felt "last year’s output was more compelling" (Classics Volume Two and Battlecry) but that both of the aforementioned "lacked finer points of instrumentation compared with Vanquish". Ehrmantraut concluded: "If Two Steps from Hell classically delivers slices of larger stories and flashes of unfinished dramas, then quite excitingly, Vanquish’s longer numbers, more extensive lyrics, and subtler orchestrations may, in places, be a little closer to offering us fully-fledged plotlines."

IFMCA-associated reviews website, MundoBSO, rated it seven out of ten stars.

== Charts ==
=== Weekly charts ===
Chart (2016–17)	Peak position
Belgian Albums (Ultratop Flanders)	169
Belgian Albums (Ultratop Wallonia)	194
UK Album Downloads (OCC)	94
UK Classical Albums (OCC)	21
UK Independent Album Breakers (OCC)	10
US Classical Albums (Billboard)	9
US Classical Crossover Albums (Billboard)	8
US Heatseekers Albums (Billboard)	5
US Independent Albums (Billboard)	34

=== Year-end charts ===
Chart (2017)	Position
US Classical Albums (Billboard)	20
