= Zdeněk Pololáník =

Czech composer (1935–2024)

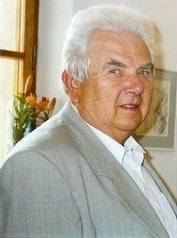
- Pololáník in 2010

Background information
- Born: 25 October 1935; Brno, Czechoslovakia
- Died: 12 August 2024 (aged 88)
- Genres: Film score, Sacred music
- Occupation: Composer
- Instrument: Organ
- Years active: 1956–2024
- Website: www.volny.cz/pololanik

Zdeněk Pololáník (25 October 1935 – 12 August 2024) was a Czech contemporary composer and organist.

== Personal life and death ==
Pololáník was born on 25 October 1935 in Brno. There he studied at the conservatory, then studied privately and subsequently at Janáček Academy of Performing Arts. He lived and worked in Ostrovačice. In addition to composing music, he worked as an organist in Ostrovačice. From 1990 to 1994 he was also the organist of the Cathedral of St. Peter and Paul in Brno. He died on 12 August 2024, at the age of 88.

His son Petr Pololáník is a conductor and orchestrator at Capellen Music Production.

== Career ==
Pololáník wrote nearly 700 compositions of various styles and genres. From the 1960s, he became a sought-after composer of film music, sacred music and commissioned works. His music has been performed by prominent musicians, orchestras and choirs worldwide.
