= Classics Volume Two =

Studio album by Two Steps From Hell
- Released: June 16, 2015
- Length: 1:07:51
- Producers: Thomas Bergersen, Nick Phoenix

Two Steps From Hell chronology
Battlecry (2015)	Classics Volume Two (2015)	Vanquish (2016)

Classics Volume Two, also stylised as Classics, Vol. 2, is the eighth public album by the group Two Steps From Hell, released in June 2015. It features 15 previously unreleased tracks from prior demonstration albums composed by Thomas J. Bergersen, and 10 entirely new tracks from Nick Phoenix (the latter all later released on their industry album, Empire). The album features tracks containing vocal performances by Felicia Farerre and Aya Peard.

== Track listing ==
No.	Title	Writer(s)	From the original demo album:	Length
1.	"Heaven & Earth"	Thomas J. Bergersen	Dynasty	2:17
2.	"Submariner"	Nick Phoenix	—	2:51
3.	"Atlas"	Thomas J. Bergersen	Power of Darkness	2:33
4.	"Neverdark"	Nick Phoenix	—	3:08
5.	"Starfall"	Thomas J. Bergersen	Nero	3:17
6.	"Aratta"	Nick Phoenix	—	2:53
7.	"Salvation" (feat. Felicia Farerre)	Thomas J. Bergersen	Nero	2:54
8.	"Mythic"	Nick Phoenix	—	2:57
9.	"Casablanca"	Thomas J. Bergersen	Nero	4:24
10.	"Fateful Night"	Thomas J. Bergersen	Legend	2:33
11.	"Bastion"	Nick Phoenix	—	2:46
12.	"Flameheart"	Thomas J. Bergersen	Dynasty	1:42
13.	"Kogan" (feat. Felicia Farerre)	Nick Phoenix	—	2:24
14.	"Magika"	Thomas J. Bergersen	Dynasty	1:56
15.	"Ride with Saracen"	Nick Phoenix	—	3:01
16.	"The Immortals"	Thomas J. Bergersen	Nemesis	2:10
17.	"Ride to Victory"	Thomas J. Bergersen	Nero	2:00
18.	"Na Vedui" (feat. Aya Peard)	Nick Phoenix	—	3:07
19.	"The Colonel"	Thomas J. Bergersen	SkyWorld (Extreme Music edition)	2:30
20.	"Dachuur"	Nick Phoenix	—	3:17
21.	"Undefeated"	Thomas J. Bergersen	Nero	2:22
22.	"Flying Snow"	Nick Phoenix	—	3:15
23.	"Riders"	Thomas J. Bergersen	Amaria	3:30
24.	"Adventure of a Lifetime"	Thomas J. Bergersen	Legend	1:09
25.	"Clock Tower Parade"	Thomas J. Bergersen	The Devil Wears Nada	2:55

== Charts ==
Chart (2015)	Peak position
US Classical Albums (Billboard)	7
US Classical Crossover Albums (Billboard)	6
