= Sun (Thomas Bergersen album) =

Studio album by Thomas Bergersen
- Released: September 30, 2014
- Length: 1:10:09

Thomas Bergersen chronology
Illusions (2011)	Sun (2014)	Humanity (2020–)

Sun is the second studio album by Norwegian composer Thomas Bergersen, of Two Steps from Hell fame. It was released in September 2014. It consists of 16 tracks, featuring vocal performances by Merethe Soltvedt, Molly Conole and The Choir of Sofia, as well as instrumental performances by Chris Bleth and Bergersen himself. The album cover and artwork are also designed by Bergersen himself. The tracks "Empire of Angels," "Final Frontier," and "Starchild" were made available as preview tracks on iTunes prior to the full release.

It took over three years for Bergersen to produce the album, following the release of his previous album, Illusions. Initially aiming for a 2013 release, he finally completed work on it in July 2014, having struggled to find the right vocalists. The inspiration for the album was the Sun itself, with Bergersen saying, "I think we owe this giant ball of fire more than a nod of appreciation." It was primarily recorded by the Capellen Orchestra in Prague, Czech Republic, conducted by Petr Pololáník. Other contributions were recorded in many other places across the globe; for some pieces, over 200 musicians were involved.

It peaked at number 3 on the US Classical Albums chart and also broke into the Billboard 200.

== Track listing ==
All tracks are written by Thomas J. Bergersen.

No.	Title	Length
1.	"Before Time"	2:18
2.	"Creation of Earth" (feat. The Choir of Sofia)	5:45
3.	"Sun" (feat. Merethe Soltvedt)	4:08
4.	"Cry" (feat. Molly Conole)	4:06
5.	"Our Destiny"	3:52
6.	"New Life" (feat. The Choir of Sofia)	4:46
7.	"Final Frontier"	4:44
8.	"Starchild"	3:20
9.	"Colors of Love" (feat. The Choir of Sofia)	6:29
10.	"Cassandra" (from Two Steps From Heaven)	3:06
11.	"Always Mine" (feat. Merethe Soltvedt)	3:21
12.	"Dragonland"	5:11
13.	"Fearless" (feat. The Choir of Sofia)	3:59
14.	"Empire of Angels" (feat. Merethe Soltvedt)	5:14
15.	"Two Hearts" (feat. Merethe Soltvedt)	4:16
16.	"In Paradisum" (Based on "Gloria" from Two Steps From Heaven)	5:30

== Critical reception ==
Mark Deming of AllMusic reviewed the album somewhat favourably, rating it three out of five stars.

IFMCA-associated reviews website, MundoBSO, rated it seven out of ten stars.

Clothilde Lebrun of Trailer Music News was very positive, stating, "equally powerful to its predecessor Illusions in terms of emotional impact, Sun is also more mature, complex, positive and romantic", concluding, "Sun is without doubt Thomas Bergersen’s finest work to date".

== Charts ==
Chart (2014)	Peak position
Belgian Albums (Ultratop Flanders)	175
Belgian Albums (Ultratop Wallonia)	142
Belgian Classical Albums (Ultratop Flanders)	1
Belgian Classical Albums (Ultratop Wallonia)	1
UK Independent Albums (OCC)	42
UK Independent Album Breakers (OCC)	10
US Billboard 200	157
US Classical Albums (Billboard)	3
US Classical Crossover Albums (Billboard)	3
US Heatseekers Albums (Billboard)	3
US Independent Albums (Billboard)	27

== Use in media ==
The tracks from Thomas Bergersen are frequently used in film trailers and other promotional materials:

- "Final Frontier" was used in the third trailer for Interstellar, the trailer for Netflix's The Titan, during the opening ceremonies of DreamHack Open Cluj-Napoca 2015, and for the Netflix trailer for Top Secret UFO Projects: Declassified.
- "Creation of Earth" was used in the third trailer for Tomorrowland. Its usage garnered some controversy as it highlighted Bergersen's incorporation of part of the Bulgarian folk song, Izlel ye Delyo Haydutin, most famously sung by Valya Balkanska, in the track, which he was accused of doing so without permission. In response, Balkanska said her consent should have been sought, however that the version used was not actually hers.
- "New Life" was used in the second trailer for Pan, and as the main theme of the 41st anniversary video of El Sistema from Venezuela.
- "Dragonland" and "Our Destiny" were used in Dragon Blade. The former was also used the opening ceremony for the final of DreamHack Masters Malmö 2017.
- "Empire of Angels" was used in the closing of each Planet Earth II episode, and in Season 3 Episode 14 of The Grand Tour.
- "Sun" and "Two Hearts" were used in the trailer for the Netflix film, The Boy Who Harnessed the Wind.
