= Classics Volume One =

Studio album by Two Steps From Hell
- Released: June 11, 2013
- Recorded: 2006–2012; 2013 for new tracks
- Length: 1:00:49
- Producer: Thomas Bergersen, Nick Phoenix

Two Steps From Hell chronology
SkyWorld (2012)	Classics Volume One (2013)	Miracles (2014)

Classics Volume One, also stylised as Classics, Vol. 1, is the fifth public album by the group Two Steps From Hell, released in June 2013. It consists of 23 tracks written by composers Thomas J. Bergersen and Nick Phoenix. This album is the first of their public albums available in lossless audio. All songs except "Return from Darkness" and "Path to Earth" are from their previous demonstration albums. The album also features an extended version of "Eternal Sorrow" from the Nemesis album, as well as tweaked versions of "Magnan Imus", "White Witch", and "The World Is Mind".

The album was later re-released to the industry via Extreme Music, containing two new brand-new bonus tracks.

== Track listing ==
Tracks 3, 8, 17, and 22 are reworked versions from their original releases.

Two slightly different versions of the album were released; the seventh track issued on iTunes and CD Baby is different to the seventh track issued via Amazon Music.

No.	Title	Writer(s)	From the original demo album:	Length
1.	"Nemesis"	Thomas J. Bergersen	Nemesis	1:21
2.	"Armada"	Thomas J. Bergersen	Dynasty	3:03
3.	"Magnan Imus"	Nick Phoenix	Power of Darkness	2:47
4.	"Jump!"	Thomas J. Bergersen	Power of Darkness	4:36
5.	"Sons of War"	Thomas J. Bergersen	Nemesis	1:57
6.	"Return from Darkness"	Nick Phoenix	—	3:34
7.	"Strength of an Empire"	Thomas J. Bergersen	Two Steps From Heaven	3:52
8.	"Eternal Sorrow"	Thomas J. Bergersen	Nemesis	2:19
9.	"The Ancients"	Nick Phoenix	Power of Darkness	2:56
10.	"Birth of a Hero"	Thomas J. Bergersen	Nero	2:13
11.	"Sky Titans"	Thomas J. Bergersen	Nemesis	2:07
12.	"Path to Earth"	Nick Phoenix	—	2:21
13.	"Earth Rising"	Thomas J. Bergersen	Power of Darkness	3:21
14.	"Ironheart"	Thomas J. Bergersen	Power of Darkness	3:00
15.	"Fortress of Seduction"	Nick Phoenix	Dreams & Imaginations	2:21
16.	"Clairvoyant"	Thomas J. Bergersen	Dreams & Imaginations	2:06
17.	"White Witch"	Nick Phoenix	Legend	2:41
18.	"Spirit of Moravia"	Thomas J. Bergersen	Two Steps From Heaven	1:50
19.	"The Cross of Antiquan"	Nick Phoenix	Power of Darkness	2:30
20.	"Asimov"	Nick Phoenix	Legend	2:12
21.	"Stormwatch"	Nick Phoenix	SkyWorld (Extreme Music edition)	2:19
22.	"The World Is Mind"	Nick Phoenix	SkyWorld (Extreme Music edition)	2:39
23.	"Little Ben"	Nick Phoenix	The Devil Wears Nada	3:45

Track exclusive to Amazon Music

No.	Title	Writer(s)	From the original demo album:	Length
7.	"Clash of Empires"	Thomas J. Bergersen	Nemesis	3:12

Tracks exclusive to Extreme Music

No.	Title	Writer(s)	From the original demo album:	Length
24.	"The Dark Unveils"	Nick Phoenix	—	3:28
25.	"Into Darkness"	Thomas J. Bergersen	—	9:20

== Critical reception ==
IFMCA-associated reviews website, MundoBSO, rated it six out of ten stars.

== Charts ==
Chart (2013)	Peak position
UK Soundtrack Albums (OCC)	36
US Classical Albums (Billboard)	10
US Classical Crossover Albums (Billboard)	9
US Heatseekers Albums (Billboard)	23

== Use in media ==
Two Steps From Hell's music has been used frequently in movie trailers.

- Nemesis was used in TV spots for 2012.
- Armada was used in the trailers for The Chronicles of Narnia: The Voyage of the Dawn Treader, The Three Musketeers, The Mummy: Tomb of the Dragon Emperor, and Mass Effect 3.
- Sons of War was used in the trailer for Your Highness and commercials for some Marvel shows, such as Agents of S.H.I.E.L.D. and the third season of the animated series Ultimate Spider-Man.
- The Calgary Flames used this song in their 2011-2012 season opening video.
- Asimov was used in an episode of The Innovators: The Men Who Built America.
- White Witch was used in the second trailer for the first season of Penny Dreadful and the trailer for King Lear.
- Magnan Imus was used in the second trailer for the first season of Penny Dreadful.
