= Unleashed (Two Steps from Hell album) =

Studio album by Two Steps from Hell
- Released: September 22, 2017
- Length: 3:55:31
- Producer: Thomas Bergersen, Nick Phoenix

Two Steps from Hell chronology
Vanquish (2016)	Unleashed (2017)	Dragon (2019)

Unleashed is the tenth studio album by the group Two Steps from Hell, released on 22 September 2017. It consists of 56 tracks (20, when excluding alternative versions and uncompressed mixes) written by composers Thomas J. Bergersen and Nick Phoenix. The album is the longest released to the public by Two Steps from Hell. It features vocal performances by Merethe Soltvedt, C.C. White, Felicia Farerre, Úyanga Bold, Nick Phoenix and Linea Adamson. The cover artwork and the sleeve are designed by Steven R. Gilmore.

Bergersen described his tracks as "generally a little lighter in tone than the previous album".

The album peaked at number 1 on the US Classical Albums chart.

== Track listing ==
The following lists the tracks as presented on the digital release.

The album was later released on CD, across three discs, on which the additional tracks are ordered differently – the alternative versions and uncompressed mixes are essentially presented back-to-front compared with the digital version, with the former on disc three and the latter, disc two. These two discs also have their own unique cover artwork, again designed by Steven R. Gilmore.

Main tracks

No.	Title	Writer(s)	Length
1.	"Unleashed" (feat. Merethe Soltvedt)	Thomas J. Bergersen	5:25
2.	"One Above All" (feat. C.C. White & Felicia Farerre)	Nick Phoenix	3:48
3.	"Impossible" (feat. Merethe Soltvedt)	Thomas J. Bergersen	8:54
4.	"Rune" (feat. Úyanga Bold)	Nick Phoenix	3:34
5.	"Wild Heart" (feat. Felicia Farerre)	Thomas J. Bergersen	3:39
6.	"Neptune and Mars" (feat. Felicia Farerre)	Nick Phoenix	4:05
7.	"Run Free"	Thomas J. Bergersen	2:37
8.	"Oracle" (feat. Úyanga Bold)	Nick Phoenix	3:51
9.	"Never Give up on Your Dreams"	Thomas J. Bergersen	5:20
10.	"Step into the Light" (feat. Nick Phoenix, C.C. White & Úyanga Bold)	Nick Phoenix	4:51
11.	"Secret Melody"	Thomas J. Bergersen	3:46
12.	"Final Days of Rome" (feat. Felicia Farerre)	Nick Phoenix	3:17
13.	"Molto Piratissimo"	Thomas J. Bergersen	3:08
14.	"Descendant of the Sun" (feat. Felicia Farerre & Úyanga Bold)	Nick Phoenix	3:48
15.	"Snow Angels" (feat. Thomas J. Bergersen – Cello)	Thomas J. Bergersen	2:45
16.	"I'll Stand Alone" (feat. Nick Phoenix & C.C. White)	Nick Phoenix	4:20
17.	"Westward"	Thomas J. Bergersen	3:39
18.	"Emblem" (feat. Felicia Farerre & Úyanga Bold)	Nick Phoenix	3:40
19.	"Foundation" (feat. Felicia Farerre)	Nick Phoenix	3:56
20.	"See Me Fight" (feat. Linea Adamson)	Thomas J. Bergersen	5:34
Total length:			1:24:56

Additional tracks

Alternate versions

No.	Title	Writer(s)	Length
21.	"Unleashed (Instrumental)"	Thomas J. Bergersen	5:25
22.	"One Above All (Instrumental)"	Nick Phoenix	3:49
23.	"Impossible (Instrumental)"	Thomas J. Bergersen	8:54
24.	"Rune (Instrumental)"	Nick Phoenix	3:33
25.	"Wild Heart (Alternate Choir)"	Thomas J. Bergersen	3:31
26.	"Neptune and Mars (Instrumental)"	Nick Phoenix	4:03
27.	"Run Free (Instrumental)"	Thomas J. Bergersen	2:37
28.	"Oracle (Instrumental)"	Nick Phoenix	3:50
29.	"Never Give up on Your Dreams (Instrumental)"	Thomas J. Bergersen	5:18
30.	"Step into the Light (Instrumental)"	Nick Phoenix	4:51
31.	"Secret Melody (Instrumental)"	Thomas J. Bergersen	3:46
32.	"Final Days of Rome (Instrumental)"	Nick Phoenix	3:17
33.	"Molto Piratissimo (Instrumental)"	Thomas J. Bergersen	3:08
34.	"Descendant of the Sun (Instrumental)"	Nick Phoenix	3:50
35.	"Emblem (Instrumental)"	Nick Phoenix	3:39
36.	"Foundation (Instrumental)"	Nick Phoenix	3:57

Uncompressed mixes

No.	Title	Writer(s)	Length
37.	"Unleashed (Uncompressed mix)" (feat. Merethe Soltvedt)	Thomas J. Bergersen	5:25
38.	"One Above All (Uncompressed mix)" (feat. C.C. White & Felicia Farerre)	Nick Phoenix	3:50
39.	"Impossible (Uncompressed mix)" (feat. Merethe Soltvedt)	Thomas J. Bergersen	8:55
40.	"Rune (Uncompressed mix)" (feat. Úyanga Bold)	Nick Phoenix	3:33
41.	"Wild Heart (Uncompressed mix)" (feat. Felicia Farerre)	Thomas J. Bergersen	3:40
42.	"Neptune and Mars (Uncompressed mix)" (feat. Felicia Farerre)	Nick Phoenix	4:03
43.	"Run Free (Uncompressed mix)"	Thomas J. Bergersen	2:38
44.	"Oracle (Uncompressed mix)" (feat. Úyanga Bold)	Nick Phoenix	3:52
45.	"Never Give up on Your Dreams (Uncompressed mix)"	Thomas J. Bergersen	5:24
46.	"Step into the Light (Uncompressed mix)" (feat. Nick Phoenix, C.C. White & Úyanga Bold)	Nick Phoenix	4:52
47.	"Secret Melody (Uncompressed mix)"	Thomas J. Bergersen	3:47
48.	"Final Days of Rome (Uncompressed mix)" (feat. Felicia Farerre)	Nick Phoenix	3:18
49.	"Molto Piratissimo (Uncompressed mix)"	Thomas J. Bergersen	3:10
50.	"Descendant of the Sun (Uncompressed mix)" (feat. Felicia Farerre & Úyanga Bold)	Nick Phoenix	3:48
51.	"Snow Angels (Uncompressed mix)" (feat. Thomas J. Bergersen – Cello)	Thomas J. Bergersen	2:45
52.	"I'll Stand Alone (Uncompressed mix)" (feat. Nick Phoenix & C.C. White)	Nick Phoenix	4:21
53.	"Westward (Uncompressed mix)"	Thomas J. Bergersen	3:38
54.	"Emblem (Uncompressed mix)" (feat. Felicia Farerre & Úyanga Bold)	Nick Phoenix	3:40
55.	"Foundation (Uncompressed mix)" (feat. Felicia Farerre)	Nick Phoenix	3:57
56.	"See Me Fight (Uncompressed mix)" (feat. Linea Adamson)	Thomas J. Bergersen	5:32

== Critical reception ==
The critique at IFMCA-associated reviews website, MundoBSO, was positive, describing it as, "in the usual line of the composers, with a wide variety of themes of enormous orchestral, melodic, vocal and choral intensity, with very powerful and beautiful moments." It was rated seven out of ten stars.

== Charts ==
=== Weekly charts ===
Chart (2017)	Peak position
Hungarian Albums (MAHASZ)	38
UK Album Downloads (OCC)	42
UK Independent Albums (OCC)	49
UK Independent Album Breakers (OCC)	14
US Classical Albums (Billboard)	1
US Classical Crossover Albums (Billboard)	1
US Heatseekers Albums (Billboard)	18
US Independent Albums (Billboard)	41

=== Year-end charts ===
Chart (2017)	Position
US Classical Albums (Billboard)	40
