= Halloween (Two Steps from Hell album) =

Studio album by Two Steps From Hell
- Released: September 25, 2012
- Recorded: 2006–2010, 2012
- Length: 1:24:28
- Producer: Thomas Bergersen, Nick Phoenix

Two Steps From Hell chronology
| Archangel (2011) | Halloween (2012) | SkyWorld (2012) |

Halloween is the third public album by the group Two Steps from Hell, released in September 2012. The album contains 48 tracks, written by composers Thomas J. Bergersen and Nick Phoenix. All the tracks, apart from To Die on Halloween, are from prior demonstration albums previously only available to the industry. This is their first public album to feature tracks with English vocals.

It was Two Step from Hell's first themed album, which they described as "spooky music... the ultimate Halloween party soundtrack.", and others as "paying homage to the horror genre". However, the group did not consider it one of their "major" releases; their next, SkyWorld, was released just a month later.

== Track listing ==
Tracks 9 and 27 are reworked versions from their original releases.

An official music video was released on YouTube as a preview for the track To Die on Halloween on 28 August 2012.

"Cemetery Waltz" was included in Town & Country's 2021 list of "The 40 Best Halloween Songs Of All Time".

| No. | Title | Writer(s) | From the original demo album: | Length |
|---|---|---|---|---|
| 1. | "Possessed Gramophone" | Thomas J. Bergersen | Dreams & Imaginations | 0:48 |
| 2. | "Cannibal" | Nick Phoenix | Pathogen | 2:20 |
| 3. | "72 Virgins" | Thomas J. Bergersen | Power of Darkness | 1:50 |
| 4. | "Swing-Set Murders" | Nick Phoenix | Ashes | 1:44 |
| 5. | "Moving Shadows" | Thomas J. Bergersen | Dreams & Imaginations | 1:39 |
| 6. | "Photos in Darkness" | Nick Phoenix | Ashes | 2:23 |
| 7. | "Cemetery Waltz" | Thomas J. Bergersen | Shadows and Nightmares | 1:09 |
| 8. | "To Die on Halloween (feat. Nick Phoenix)" | Nick Phoenix | — | 3:12 |
| 9. | "This Is Oh My Dear (feat. Monica Barta)" | Thomas J. Bergersen | music : "Monkey Business" from The Devil Wears Nada | 2:39 |
| 10. | "Welcome to Widow Woods" | Thomas J. Bergersen | music : "Inhuman Growth" from Shadows and Nightmares | 1:07 |
| 11. | "Helevator" | Nick Phoenix | Ashes | 2:09 |
| 12. | "Ashes" | Nick Phoenix | Ashes | 2:13 |
| 13. | "Something Wicked Lurks" | Thomas J. Bergersen | Ashes | 1:11 |
| 14. | "Come What May" | Thomas J. Bergersen | Shadows and Nightmares | 1:09 |
| 15. | "Hunter's Moon" | Thomas J. Bergersen | Nemesis | 0:49 |
| 16. | "Green Hill Massacre" | Nick Phoenix | Ashes | 1:37 |
| 17. | "Ghostly Presence" | Thomas J. Bergersen | Shadows and Nightmares | 0:58 |
| 18. | "Bottomless Pit of Torment" | Thomas J. Bergersen | Shadows and Nightmares | 0:22 |
| 19. | "Crawlspace" | Nick Phoenix | Ashes | 0:47 |
| 20. | "Exhumed" | Thomas J. Bergersen | Ashes | 2:44 |
| 21. | "Jocelyn Janson" | Nick Phoenix | Ashes | 1:44 |
| 22. | "Evil!" | Thomas J. Bergersen | Shadows and Nightmares | 1:08 |
| 23. | "Crossword Killer" | Nick Phoenix | Ashes | 1:56 |
| 24. | "Mmm Chicken" | Thomas J. Bergersen | Dreams & Imaginations | 1:12 |
| 25. | "Diabolic Clockwork" | Thomas J. Bergersen | All Drums go to Hell | 1:46 |
| 26. | "Take Me to Hell" | Nick Phoenix | Ashes | 2:17 |
| 27. | "Deck the Halls With Blood (feat. Monica Barta)" | Thomas J. Bergersen | Ashes | 2:09 |
| 28. | "Burn Baby" | Thomas J. Bergersen | Ashes | 1:30 |
| 29. | "Death Came Early That Year" | Thomas J. Bergersen | All Drums go to Hell | 0:59 |
| 30. | "Madnophone" | Nick Phoenix | Ashes | 1:36 |
| 31. | "Power of Darkness" | Thomas J. Bergersen | Power of Darkness | 2:50 |
| 32. | "Shed My Skin" | Nick Phoenix | Pathogen | 3:46 |
| 33. | "She Rises" | Thomas J. Bergersen | Shadows and Nightmares | 1:23 |
| 34. | "Decimator" | Thomas J. Bergersen | Power of Darkness | 1:54 |
| 35. | "Stumpy" | Nick Phoenix | Ashes | 2:16 |
| 36. | "Calamity" | Thomas J. Bergersen | Legend | 1:40 |
| 37. | "Flashes of Terror" | Nick Phoenix | Ashes | 1:28 |
| 38. | "It Lives" | Thomas J. Bergersen | Nero | 1:36 |
| 39. | "Pane of Darkness" | Nick Phoenix | Shadows and Nightmares | 1:17 |
| 40. | "Twisted Children" | Thomas J. Bergersen | Ashes | 1:22 |
| 41. | "Rising Darkness" | Nick Phoenix | Shadows and Nightmares | 1:49 |
| 42. | "Black Assassin" | Thomas J. Bergersen | Dynasty | 2:20 |
| 43. | "Raven Hill" | Nick Phoenix | Ashes | 1:34 |
| 44. | "Red Omen" | Thomas J. Bergersen | Nemesis | 1:25 |
| 45. | "Zombie Train" | Nick Phoenix | Ashes | 2:20 |
| 46. | "Split Personality" | Nick Phoenix | Ashes | 1:31 |
| 47. | "Waltz of the Willows" | Thomas J. Bergersen | The Devil Wears Nada | 1:59 |
| 48. | "Otherworld" | Nick Phoenix | Pathogen | 2:52 |

== Critical reception ==
IFMCA-associated reviews website, MundoBSO, rated it six out of ten stars.

== Use in media ==
Two Steps From Hell's music has been used frequently in movie trailers and commercials.

- Ashes was used in the "Rise of the Rakghouls" trailer for Star Wars: The Old Republic.
- Calamity was used in the Killzone 3 Justice Trailer.
- Hunter's Moon was used in the trailer for Beowulf.
- Black Assassin was used in a trailer for Assassin's Creed IV: Black Flag.
- Welcome to Widow Woods was used in an episode of The Men Who Built America.
- Deck the Halls with Blood was used in the Amnesia mod "Tenebris Lake."
