= Capellen Choir =

- Capellen Choir during recording session for Manowar

Background information
- Origin: Czech Republic
- Genre: Film and Pop Symphony
- Occupation: Studio Symphony Chorus
- Years active: 2006 - present
- Members: Selective choralist and soloists within EU; Founder; Petr Pololanik
- Website: www.capellen.cz

Capellen Choir is a custom sized studio chorus (80+), utilizing selected singers from the Czech Republic, Slovakia, Austria and Hungary. Formed and exclusively used by Capellen Music Production.

== Discography ==
- Sons of Odin (2006)
- Three Kingdoms: Resurrection of the Dragon (2009)

== Filmography ==
- Three Kingdoms: Resurrection of the Dragon (2009)
- Future X-Cops (2010)
- 14 Blades (2010)
- The Tudors (2010)
- The Pillars of the Earth (TV miniseries) (2010)
