= Jo Blankenburg =

German composer based in Los Angeles

- Born: Kulmbach, Germany
- Genres: Orchestral, film score, trailer music, epic music
- Occupation: Composer
- Instruments: Piano, drums
- Years active: 2007–present
- Website: joblankenburg.com

Jo Blankenburg is a German composer based in Los Angeles. He writes music for film and motion picture advertising. His primary musical instrument is the piano.

== Early life and education ==
Blankenburg was born and raised in Munich, Germany. He has completed a Film Scoring and Orchestration course at Berklee College of Music.

He was trained to play organ.

== Career ==
Blankenburg once won the MTV Europe Songwriting Contest.

Some of his most popular tracks have been used in the advertising campaigns of The Hunger Games, Harry Potter and the Deathly Hallows, X-Men: First Class, and How To Train Your Dragon among many others.

A solo album Vendetta was released in 2011 by Position Music. This album's songs of have been used for the advertising campaigns of many major movies and television shows. Another solo album, Elysium, was recorded with Capellen Orchestra & Choir in Zlín, Czech Republic. The album was released in 2012 on Position Music.

Blankenburg's "Fearmonger" from his 2020 album Vanguard was chosen for the Netflix series Shadow & Bone soundtrack.

== Personal life ==
Blankenburg resides in Los Angeles, but has also resided in New York City and Auckland, New Zealand.

== Albums ==
=== Floatovations ===
Jo Blankenburg's debut album, Floatovations, published by Zero Latency, was released on January 9, 2007. The album comprised five meditative compositions with an ocean/sea theme.

No.	Title	Length
1.	"The Realm of Levitation"	15:13
2.	"Below the Surface"	15:09
3.	"Merman Encounter"	8:45
4.	"Reaching the Seabed"	7:47
5.	"Awakening"	15:30
Total length:		1:02:24

=== Vendetta ===
An album composed by Jo Blankenburg for Position Music, released on March 21, 2011. Its songs were used for major motion advertising campaigns for Harry Potter and the Deathly Hallows, X-Men: First Class and The Twilight Saga: Breaking Dawn among many others.

No.	Title	Length
1.	"Dystopic"	2:24
2.	"Satorius"	2:09
3.	"Imperatix Mundi"	2:59
4.	"Juggernaut"	2:53
5.	"Hymn Of The Apocalypse"	2:51
6.	"Praetorian Guards"	2:32
7.	"Lament For Cherubin"	2:56
8.	"Knights Of Palmyra"	2:33
9.	"Vendetta"	2:12
10.	"Conquest Of Antaria"	2:20
11.	"Enamorus"	3:25
12.	"Kingdom of Avilion"	2:42
13.	"Chimeran Empire"	2:39
Total length:		34:35

=== Elysium ===
Elysium was released on July 31, 2012 by Position Music, following the success of Vendetta.

No.	Title	Length
1.	"Garador's Flight"	2:49
2.	"Ascencia"	2:08
3.	"Gryphonheart"	2:39
4.	"Illumielle"	2:41
5.	"Terra Mirus"	3:11
6.	"Leaving Lemuria"	2:58
7.	"Zephyrus"	2:39
8.	"Arion"	2:23
9.	"Voyage Dans La Lune"	2:34
10.	"Empyrea"	3:27
11.	"Theogony"	2:35
Total length:		30:04

== Trailer music ==
- 2009 – The Wolfman
- 2009 – How To Train Your Dragon
- 2009 – FlashForward
- 2011 – "Dystopic" for featurette X-Men: First Class
- 2011 – "Satorius" for TV Spot Harry Potter and the Deathly Hallows
- 2011 – "Conquest of Antaria" for Featurette Harry Potter and the Deathly Hallows
- 2011 – "Juggernaut" and "Satorius" for America's Got Talent
- 2011 – "Vendetta" and "Satorius" for TV Spot The Twilight Saga: Breaking Dawn
- 2011 – "Vendetta" for Home Video Trailer Rise of the Planet of the Apes
- 2011 – "Enamorus" for Far Cry 3
- 2012 – "Apophis" for TV Spot The Hunger Games
- 2012 – "Illumielle" for the official Christmas television advert for British department store Debenhams
- 2013 – "Imperatrix Mundi" for 300: Rise of an Empire
- 2014 – "Garador's Flight" for ABC News intro music at 05:30 for the switchover from BBC World Service
- 2018 - "Hiraeth" for Kingdom Come: Deliverance
- 2019 - "Play the Ponies" for Knives Out
- 2020 - "The Magellan Matrix" for Wonder Woman 1984

== Credits ==
- 2005 – "Shortfilm: The World Beneath"
- 2005 – "Documentary: Ticket"
- 2006 – "Documentary: Poetry"
- 2006 – "Feature Film: Stages"
- 2007 – "Music Video: Vahveraasio"
- 2007 – "Shortfilm: Omega99"
- 2007 – "Music Video: Planet Earth Forever"
- 2008 – "Shortfilm: Squalid"
- 2008 – "Four orchestral pieces for Immediate Music
- 2009 – "Music for Congolese opera"
- 2009 – "Theme music for World of Wearable Art
- 2010 – "Demo music for Dr. Grordbort, Weta Workshop (Lord of the Rings)"
- 2011 – "Audio-visual project Oil Spill for Berlin International Film Festival showcase
- 2011 – "Music for documentary The Human Experience"
- 2011 – "Shortfilm: Anamnesis"
- 2011 – "Music for Qtel commercial promoting the 2011 World of Wearable Art

== Discography ==
- 2007 – Floatovations (solo album)
- 2008 – The Feather Dance (solo album)
- 2008 – Squalid (Original Motion Picture Soundtrack)
- 2010 – Vendetta (Position Music)
- 2011 – The Human Experience (Grassroots Films)
- 2012 – Elysium (Position Music)
- 2012 – The Rebirth (single)
- 2015 – Kaleidoscope (Position Music)
- 2016 – Valkyrie (Position Music)
- 2017 – Cronos (Position Music)
- 2018 – Clandestine (Position Music)
- 2018 – Cosmagora (Position Music)
- 2018 – Stillness Speaks (solo album)
- 2019 – Rakasha (solo album)
- 2019 – Petrichor (Position Music)
- 2019 – Sacrosanct (Position Music)
- 2019 – Mile X Mile (Position Music)
- 2019 – Eleomera (Position Music)
- 2020 – Vanguard (Position Music)
- 2020 – Hemispheres (Position Music)
- 2020 – Ghost in the Machine (Position Music)
- 2020 – Vandals (Position Music)
- 2021 – Memoirs (Position Music)
- 2021 – Sentience (Position Music)
- 2021 – Unravel (Position Music)
- 2022 – The World Is Waiting (Position Music)
- 2022 – Clandestine II: Vespertine (Position Music)
- 2022 – Clandestine III: Emanence (Position Music)
- 2023 – Rust (Position Music)
- 2023 - Vocalese (Position Music)

== See also ==
- Trailer music
