= SkyWorld =

Studio album by Two Steps From Hell
- Released: October 25, 2012
- Recorded: July 2012
- Length: 1:15:56
- Producer: Thomas Bergersen, Nick Phoenix

Two Steps From Hell chronology
Halloween (2012)	SkyWorld (2012)	Classics Volume One (2013)

SkyWorld is the fourth public album by the group Two Steps from Hell, released in October 2012; their third major release following the success of Invincible and Archangel. The album contains 22 tracks written by composers Thomas J. Bergersen and Nick Phoenix. All tracks, except for "Dark Ages", are brand new original tracks. This is the second of their albums featuring tracks with English lyrics, namely Titan Dream (feat. C.C. White and Nick Phoenix), The End is the Beginning (feat. Nick Phoenix), and Back to the Earth (feat. Nick Phoenix). Recording took place in both Brno, Czech Republic and Los Angeles, United States.

The cover and sleeve are designed by Steven R. Gilmore, with the futuristic city illustration by Sergey Vorontsov. The album was later re-released to the industry via Extreme Music, featuring exclusive bonus tracks.

It had sold ~20,000 copies in the United States nine months after release, according to SoundScan.

== Track listing ==
No.	Title	Writer(s)	Length
1.	"All is Hell That Ends Well"	Thomas Bergersen	3:53
2.	"Titan Dream"	Nick Phoenix	4:04
3.	"SkyWorld"	Thomas Bergersen	3:12
4.	"El Dorado"	Thomas Bergersen	4:14
5.	"The End is the Beginning"	Nick Phoenix	4:51
6.	"All the King's Horses"	Thomas Bergersen	2:06
7.	"Realm of Power"	Nick Phoenix	3:55
8.	"Winterspell"	Thomas Bergersen	3:20
9.	"Blackheart"	Thomas Bergersen	4:27
10.	"Juggernaut"	Nick Phoenix	2:34
11.	"Dark Ages (Remix)" (original version from Nemesis)	Thomas Bergersen	3:25
12.	"Our Last Hope"	Nick Phoenix	3:57
13.	"Icarus"	Nick Phoenix	2:53
14.	"For the Win"	Thomas Bergersen	2:12
15.	"Sun & Moon"	Thomas Bergersen	4:22
16.	"Big Sky"	Nick Phoenix	4:08
17.	"Starfleet"	Nick Phoenix	3:22
18.	"Queen of Crows"	Nick Phoenix	2:43
19.	"Blizzard"	Thomas Bergersen	2:53
20.	"Breathe"	Thomas Bergersen	2:56
21.	"Back to the Earth"	Nick Phoenix	4:24
22.	"Ocean Kingdom"	Nick Phoenix	2:20
Total length:			1:15:56

Cut track
No.	Title	Writer(s)	Length
23.	"Freedom Fighters (Remix)"	Thomas Bergersen	2:34

Tracks exclusive to Extreme Music
No.	Title	Writer(s)	Length
24.	"Identity Crime"	Nick Phoenix	3:09
25.	"Beneath the Ice"	Nick Phoenix	2:02
26.	"The World is Mind" (later publicly released on Classics Volume One)	Nick Phoenix	2:39
27.	"Children from the War"	Thomas Bergersen	2:37
28.	"Requiem for Destruction"	Thomas Bergersen	1:30
29.	"The Colonel" (later publicly released on Classics Volume Two)	Thomas Bergersen	2:30
30.	"Stormwatch" (later publicly released on Classics Volume One)	Nick Phoenix	2:20

== Personnel ==
Per liner notes

Core

- Thomas J. Bergersen – composer; producer; violin on "Winterspell" and "Blackheart"; guitar on "Dark Ages"; vocals on "Sun & Moon"
- Nick Phoenix – composer; producer; vocals on "Titan Dream", "The End Is the Beginning", and "Back to the Earth"
- Capellen Orchestra – orchestra; choir
- Petr Pololanik – conductor

Additional

- C.C. White – vocals on "Titan Dream"
- Aya Peard – vocals on "Titan Dream", "Our Last Hope", and "Ocean Kingdom"
- Merethe Soltvedt – vocals on "All the King's Horses", "For the Win", and "Breathe"
- Carina Istre – vocals on "Sun & Moon"
- Molly Conole – vocals on "Blizzard"
- Tina Guo – cello on "Titan Dream", "The End Is the Beginning", "Big Sky", and "Back to the Earth"
- Shane Gibson – guitar on "The End Is the Beginning" and "Juggernaut"
- James Rickabaugh – guitar on "Big Sky"
- Tal Bergman – drums on "The End Is the Beginning", "Juggernaut", and "Our Last Hope"
- Chris Bleth – winds on "Realm of Power", "Big Sky", and "Back to the Earth"

== Critical reception ==
James Monger of AllMusic reviewed the album positively, claiming the tracks felt "like the best parts of a Hans Zimmer score condensed into three-to-four minute bursts of over the top tension and melodrama". He rated it four out of five stars.

The critique at IFMCA-associated reviews website, MundoBSO, was positive, saying, "orchestral, melodic, vocal and choral intensity is combined with lyricism and evocative force. It is very spectacular and contains very remarkable moments." It was rated seven out of ten stars.

== Charts ==
=== Weekly charts ===
Chart (2012–13)	Peak position
Belgian Classical Albums (Ultratop Flanders)	12
Belgian Classical Albums (Ultratop Wallonia)	12
US Classical Albums (Billboard)	10
US Classical Crossover Albums (Billboard)	9
US Heatseekers Albums (Billboard)	19

=== Year-end charts ===
Chart (2013)	Position
US Classical Albums (Billboard)	29

== Use in media ==
Two Steps from Hell's music has been licensed for several trailers.

- All is Hell that Ends Well and Titan Dream were used in some History Channel commercials.
- Blackheart was used in a PlayStation 4 commercial and the cast introduction act from the main show of Mediacorp's premier annual television awards, Star Awards 2017.
- For the Win was used in a trailer for the movie, Epic, a commercial for the Cartoon Network series, Ben 10: Omniverse, and a CNN commercial. It was also used by Kenichi Ebina in his performances en route to his victory in the reality show, America's Got Talent, and as the theme song to CTV/TSN’s coverage of the 2018 FIFA World Cup in Russia.
- The Colonel was used in a commercial for the Disney XD show, Lab Rats, as well as a trailer for the Pokémon movie, Volcanion and the Mechanical Marvel. It was used by Dream Theater, during 2017 as the opening song of the Images, Words & Beyond tour.
- El Dorado was used in Sasuke as the theme song for competitor Tomohiro Kawaguchi.
- Breathe was used in the movie Chateau de la Reine as a soundtrack cover towards the ending.
- "Titan Dream was used in both the 2017 and the 2018 NBC Ironman (Kona) Triathlon broadcast.
- El Dorado was used in the 2019 Persian Gulf Map release trailer for DCS.
