= Miracles (Two Steps from Hell album) =

Studio album by Two Steps from Hell
- Released: June 2, 2014
- Genre: New-age
- Length: 1:17:48
- Producer: Thomas Bergersen

Two Steps from Hell chronology
Classics Volume One (2013)	Miracles (2014)	Battlecry (2015)

Miracles is the sixth public album by the group Two Steps From Hell, released in June 2014. It consists of 21 tracks written entirely by composer Thomas J. Bergersen. This album predominantly features material selected from earlier demonstration albums, including Dreams & Imaginations, Illumina, Two Steps From Heaven, and Volume One. However the title track, "Compass", and "Stay" are brand new tracks. The previously unreleased tracks "Sun Gazer," "Eyes Closing," "My Freedom," "Perfect Love", and "Wind Queen" appear with various tweaks and embellishments.

Upon the request of fans, the album is a collection of the group's "ethereal", "emotional", "relaxing" and "dreamy" tracks, described as the "counterpart" to the more epic, upbeat tracks that have appeared on past releases. The cover and sleeve are designed by Steven R. Gilmore.

== Track listing ==
Tracks 4, 5, 9, 10, and 17 are reworked versions from their original releases.

All tracks are written by Thomas J. Bergersen.

No.	Title	From the original demo album:	Length
1.	"Miracles"	—	5:29
2.	"Eria"	Dreams & Imaginations	2:38
3.	"Compass"	—	5:34
4.	"Sun Gazer"	Dreams & Imaginations	2:56
5.	"Eyes Closing"	Illumina	3:12
6.	"Fountain of Life"	Nemesis	3:28
7.	"Stay (feat. Merethe Soltvedt)"	—	3:22
8.	"Men of Honor"	Two Steps from Heaven	3:20
9.	"My Freedom (feat. Merethe Soltvedt)"	Nero	3:55
10.	"Perfect Love"	Dreams & Imaginations; titled "Parfait Amour".	3:30
11.	"Lux Aeterna"	Dreams & Imaginations	3:26
12.	"I Love You Forever"	Illumina	4:00
13.	"Color the Sky"	Dreams & Imaginations	2:34
14.	"Forever in My Dreams"	Dreams & Imaginations	2:05
15.	"Breath of Cold Air"	Volume One	4:23
16.	"Heart"	Two Steps From Heaven; titled "<3".	2:59
17.	"Wind Queen"	Volume One	2:06
18.	"Northern Pastures"	Dreams & Imaginations	2:10
19.	"Science"	Illumina	2:06
20.	"Lost in Las Vegas"	Illumina	10:14

Bonus tracks / alternative versions
No.	Title	From the original demo album:	Length
21.	"Compass (feat. Merethe Soltvedt)"	—	4:22

== Critical reception ==
The critique at IFMCA-associated reviews website, MundoBSO, was positive, highlighting its "moments of careful lyrical beauty". It was rated seven out of ten stars.

== Charts ==
=== Weekly charts ===
Chart (2014)	Peak position
Belgian Albums (Ultratop Wallonia)	157
Belgian Classical Albums (Ultratop Flanders)	7
Belgian Classical Albums (Ultratop Wallonia)	1
UK Soundtrack Albums (OCC)	14
US Classical Albums (Billboard)	3
US Classical Crossover Albums (Billboard)	2
US Heatseekers Albums (Billboard)	9

=== Year-end charts ===
Chart (2014)	Position
US Classical Albums (Billboard)	41

== Use in media ==
Two Steps From Hell's music has been featured frequently in movie trailers.

- "Color the Sky" was used in the official teaser for the Virgin Oceanic Sub.
- "Fountain of Life" was used in The Men Who Built America in the episode "When One Ends, Another Begins."
- "Forever in My Dreams" is used as the entrance music for Total Nonstop Action Wrestling manager/wrestler Maria Kanellis.
- "Men of Honor" is used after Nagano Makoto's last run in Sasuke 32.
- "Science" is used in the official trailer of BBC's The Green Planet.
