= Nick Phoenix =

- Origin: London, England
- Occupations: Singer-songwriter; composer; musician; producer
- Instruments: Piano; keyboards; synthesizers; vocals
- Years active: 1997–present
- Website: https://nickphoenix.com/

Nick Phoenix (born 25 August 1967 in London, England) is a British composer, pianist, and co-founder of the production music company Two Steps from Hell. He has written music for a number of trailers, with over 1,200 scores and placements in total.

Since 1997, he has been involved in composing film trailer music and producing virtual instrument libraries for EastWest Sounds.

== Career ==
In 2006, he formed Two Steps from Hell with his business partner, Thomas Bergersen, and the two publicly released the album Invincible in 2010. Several additional commercial album releases have since followed, including Archangel and SkyWorld, each of which has charted on the iTunes top 100 in the Soundtracks category. Phoenix also performed in a 2013 live concert at the Walt Disney Concert Hall alongside Bergersen, confirming at least one future concert planned for Europe.

In 2013, he released a solo hybrid electronic/orchestral album titled Speed of Sound.

Phoenix's band, Crater Mountain, released its classic rock-genre debut album Hillbilly Starship in 2014, with plans to begin live performances in the fall of that year.

The 2014 release of his first published written work, Colin Frake on Fire Mountain, was accompanied by a Two Steps From Hell soundtrack release featuring music composed by himself and Thomas Bergersen.

The second installment, Colin Frake Asclepius, was published in April 2017.

== Personal life ==
On 15 November 2015 Phoenix's son, Jack, who was 15 years old, was killed in a hit and run incident. The album Vanquish was dedicated to his memory.

== Discography ==
=== Solo albums ===
- Speed of Sound (2013) [Hybrid sci-fi genre solo album]
- King of One (2021) [Lyrical Rock album]
- Wide World (2022) [Lyrical Rock album]
- Underdog (2024) [Lyrical Rock album]

=== Two Steps from Hell ===
==== Demonstration albums ====
- Volume One (2006) [First album, featuring various genres]
- Shadows and Nightmares (2006) [Horror genre album]
- Dynasty (2007) [Epic genre album]
- All Drums Go to Hell (2007) [Heavily percussion-oriented album]
- Nemesis (2007) [Epic genre album mostly composed by Thomas Bergersen]
- Pathogen (2007) [Electro-metal album largely composed by Nick Phoenix].
- Dreams & Imaginations (2008) [New Age album]
- Legend (2008) [Epic genre album, with some tracks composed by Troels Folmann]
- Ashes (2008) [Horror genre album]
- The Devil Wears Nada (2009) [Mostly light and humorous album]
- Power of Darkness (2010) [Epic genre album]
- All Drones Go to Hell (2010) [Also known as Mystical Beginnings; New Age album]
- Illumina (2010) [New Age album]
- Balls to the Wall (2011) [Percussion album, with some tracks composed by Alex Pfeffer]
- Nero (2011) [Epic genre album, with some tracks composed by Alex Pfeffer]
- Cyanide (2013) [Percussion and electro-metal album]
- Crime Lab (2013) [Industrial electronica album]
- Open Conspiracy (2014) [Epic Hybrid album also featuring Hitesh Ceon and Nick Pittsinger, as well as Thomas Bergersen]

==== Public albums ====
- Invincible (2010) [Compilation of some of the most popular Two Steps From Hell tracks]
- Archangel (2011) [Compilation of more of the most popular Two Steps From Hell tracks]
- Demon's Dance (2012) [Compilation of tracks previously unreleased to the public, available only on the Two Steps From Hell application for iOS and Android]
- Halloween (2012) [Compilation of well-known horror tracks from several demonstration albums, with several other-genre tracks as well]
- SkyWorld (2012) [First public album featuring almost entirely new music]
- Classics Volume One (2013) [Compilation of previously unreleased tracks. First public album available in lossless audio]
- Colin Frake on Fire Mountain (July 2014) [Soundtrack accompaniment for an original Nick Phoenix-penned e-book. Also features music composed by Thomas Bergersen]
- Battlecry (2015) ["Ultra epic" follow-up to SkyWorld and the first public album to be released on two discs.]
- Classics Volume Two (2015) [Compilation of new and previously unreleased tracks.]
- Vanquish (2016) [Album published in November 2016, dedicated to his deceased son, Jack Phoenix]
- Myth (2022)

=== Crater Mountain ===
- Hillbilly Starship (2014)

== See also ==
- Thomas J. Bergersen
- Two Steps from Hell
