= Power of Darkness =

Power Of Darkness

Demo album by Two Steps From Hell
- Released: March 10, 2010
- Length: 1:24:42 (main tracks); 3:24:46 (incl. alternatives)

Power of Darkness is a demonstration album by the music production group Two Steps from Hell, originally released exclusively to clients in the motion picture and advertising industry for the purpose of licensing in March 2010. It was uniquely distributed on a flash drive, rather than a physical disc. It includes 32 principal tracks, split into two themed volumes. Additionally, it contains a large collection of alternative versions; therefore, in total, Power of Darkness consists of 77 tracks. They are composed by Thomas J. Bergersen and Nick Phoenix. The album was recorded in Prague, Czech Republic (by Capellen Orchestra), in Los Angeles, and in Utah, United States. The cover artwork and the sleeve are designed by Steven R. Gilmore.

Some tracks were made available to the general public on subsequent commercial albums, starting with Invincible (2010). In 2017, the album was finally released to the public, albeit modified to consist of only tracks which had still not yet been made commercially available and under the title of Power of Darkness Anthology.

== Track listing ==
Below is the original track listing.

The public re-issue of the album as Power of Darkness Anthology was released on 1 August 2017. Its listing is different to the original – it is most of the remaining tracks which, until its release, were still unavailable for public purchase and arranged in a different order; tracks which had already been released to the public on other commercial albums were excluded. Therefore, Power of Darkness Anthology features 40 tracks and has a total length of 01:39:57. The main versions of "The Soul That Must Awaken" and "Ghost Brigades" were omitted from the release as the group were "just not happy" with them, opting to including their alternatives instead.

Volume 1 – "Epic drama"

Main tracks

No.	Title	Writer(s)	Later released on the public album:	Length
1.	"Power of Darkness"	Thomas J. Bergersen	Halloween	2:50
2.	"Fire Nation"	Nick Phoenix	Invincible	3:00
3.	"Black Blade"	Thomas J. Bergersen	Invincible	3:06
4.	"Master of Shadows"	Nick Phoenix	Invincible	3:05
5.	"What's Happening To Me"	Thomas J. Bergersen	Archangel	3:09
6.	"Atlas"	Thomas J. Bergersen	Classics Volume Two	2:34
7.	"Earth Rising"	Thomas J. Bergersen	Classics Volume One	3:21
8.	"The Soul That Must Awaken"	Nick Phoenix	—	3:18
9.	"Eternal Honor"	Nick Phoenix	Power of Darkness Anthology	2:16
10.	"Gravitation"	Thomas J. Bergersen	Power of Darkness Anthology	1:55
11.	"Bed of Nails"	Nick Phoenix	Power of Darkness Anthology	1:34
12.	"Invincible"	Thomas J. Bergersen	Invincible	2:52
13.	"The Ancients"	Nick Phoenix	Classics Volume One	2:55
14.	"Dark Harbor"	Nick Phoenix	Archangel	3:15
15.	"Jump!"	Thomas J. Bergersen	Classics Volume One	4:37
16.	"The Cross of Antiquan"	Nick Phoenix	Classics Volume One	2:28
17.	"Ten Feet Tall"	Nick Phoenix	Power of Darkness Anthology	1:59
18.	"Ironwing"	Nick Phoenix	Archangel	2:38

Alternative mixes
All tracks (except for nos. 7, 8, 10, 15, 16 and 18) were later released on the public version of the album, Power of Darkness Anthology.

No.	Title	Writer(s)	Length
1.	"Power of Darkness (No Choir)"	Thomas J. Bergersen	2:49
2.	"Fire Nation (No Choir)"	Nick Phoenix	3:03
3.	"Fire Nation (Alternative Version)"	Nick Phoenix	0:33
4.	"Black Blade (No Choir)"	Thomas J. Bergersen	3:05
5.	"Master of Shadows (No Choir)"	Nick Phoenix	3:04
6.	"Master of Shadows (Alternative Version)"	Nick Phoenix	3:04
7.	"Master of Shadows (Alternative Version 2)"	Nick Phoenix	3:04
8.	"Master of Shadows (Alternative Version 3)"	Nick Phoenix	3:04
9.	"What's Happening To Me (No Choir)"	Thomas J. Bergersen	3:09
10.	"What's Happening To Me (Alternative Version)"	Thomas J. Bergersen	3:10
11.	"Atlas (No Choir)"	Thomas J. Bergersen	2:33
12.	"Atlas (Alternative Version)"	Thomas J. Bergersen	2:33
13.	"Earth Rising (No Choir)"	Thomas J. Bergersen	3:21
14.	"The Soul That Must Awaken (No Choir)"	Nick Phoenix	3:18
15.	"The Soul That Must Awaken (Alternative Version)"	Nick Phoenix	3:20
16.	"The Soul That Must Awaken (Alternative Version 2)"	Nick Phoenix	3:19
17.	"Eternal Honor (No Choir)"	Nick Phoenix	2:15
18.	"Eternal Honor (Alternative Version)"	Nick Phoenix	2:15
19.	"Invincible (No Choir)"	Thomas J. Bergersen	2:50
20.	"The Ancients (No Choir)"	Nick Phoenix	2:56
21.	"Dark Harbor (No Choir)"	Nick Phoenix	3:16
22.	"The Cross of Antiquan (No Choir)"	Nick Phoenix	2:29
23.	"Ten Feet Tall (No Choir)"	Nick Phoenix	2:00
24.	"Ironwing (No Choir)"	Nick Phoenix	2:37

Volume 2 – "Action"

Main tracks

No.	Title	Writer(s)	Later released on the public album:	Length
1.	"Fight The Machine"	Nick Phoenix	Power of Darkness Anthology	2:04
2.	"Ironheart"	Thomas J. Bergersen	Classics Volume One	3:03
3.	"Velocitron"	Nick Phoenix	Invincible	2:32
4.	"Titan Dune"	Thomas J. Bergersen	Archangel	2:11
5.	"Argovia"	Nick Phoenix	Power of Darkness Anthology	2:27
6.	"He Who Brings The Night"	Thomas J. Bergersen	Archangel	3:09
7.	"Norwegian Pirate"	Thomas J. Bergersen	Archangel	3:00
8.	"Decimator"	Thomas J. Bergersen	Halloween	1:54
9.	"Kronos"	Nick Phoenix	Power of Darkness Anthology	2:29
10.	"Magnan Imus"	Nick Phoenix	Classics Volume One	2:47
11.	"Freefall"	Thomas J. Bergersen	Power of Darkness Anthology	2:04
12.	"Clockmen"	Nick Phoenix	Power of Darkness Anthology	2:03
13.	"Ghost Brigades"	Nick Phoenix	—	2:33
14.	"72 Virgins"	Thomas J. Bergersen	Halloween	1:50

Alternative mixes
All tracks (except for nos. 5, 6, 8, 9, 13, 14, 16 and 17) were later released on the public version of the album, Power of Darkness Anthology.

No.	Title	Writer(s)	Length
1.	"Ironheart (No Choir)"	Thomas J. Bergersen	2:03
2.	"Velocitron (No Choir)""	Nick Phoenix	2:32
3.	"Titan Dune (No Choir)"	Thomas J. Bergersen	2:10
4.	"Argovia (No Choir)"	Nick Phoenix	2:27
5.	"Argovia (No Choir Alternative Version)"	Nick Phoenix	2:29
6.	"Argovia (Alternative Version)"	Nick Phoenix	2:29
7.	"He Who Brings The Night (No Choir)"	Thomas J. Bergersen	3:09
8.	"He Who Brings The Night (No Choir Alternative Version)"	Thomas J. Bergersen	3:08
9.	"He Who Brings The Night (Alternative Version)"	Thomas J. Bergersen	3:09
10.	"Norwegian Pirate (No Choir)"	Thomas J. Bergersen	3:00
11.	"Decimator (No Choir)"	Thomas J. Bergersen	1:54
12.	"Kronos (No Choir)"	Nick Phoenix	2:29
13.	"Kronos (No Choir Alternative Version)"	Nick Phoenix	2:47
14.	"Kronos (Alternative Version)"	Nick Phoenix	2:47
15.	"Magnan Imus (No Choir)"	Nick Phoenix	2:46
16.	"Magnan Imus (No Choir Alternative Version)"	Nick Phoenix	2:47
17.	"Magnan Imus (Alternative Version)"	Nick Phoenix	2:47
18.	"Freefall (No Choir)"	Thomas J. Bergersen	2:04
19.	"Clockmen (No Choir)"	Nick Phoenix	2:03
20.	"Ghost Brigades (No Choir)"	Nick Phoenix	2:34
21.	"72 Virgins (No Choir)"	Thomas J. Bergersen	1:49

== Critical reception ==
IFMCA-associated reviews website, MundoBSO, rated it seven out of ten stars.

Trailer Music News called it "probably the most epic album by Two Steps From Hell" at the time.

== Charts ==
As a demo, the album was not available for public purchase and therefore unable to enter any charts.

However, the re-release of the album as Power of Darkness Anthology in 2017 was a public offering and did chart as follows:

Chart (2017)	Peak position
US Classical Albums (Billboard)	10
US Classical Crossover Albums (Billboard)	9

== Use in media ==
Two Steps From Hell's music has been featured frequently in trailers and commercials.

- Master of Shadows was used in for the trailers for 2012 and Abraham Lincoln: Vampire Hunter and in commercials for Harry Potter and the Deathly Hallows – Part 2.
- Black Blade was used in trailers for Mass Effect 3, Prince of Persia: The Sands of Time, and Priest, TV spots for Star Trek, X-Men Origins: Wolverine, X-Men: First Class, Harry Potter and the Deathly Hallows – Part 2, Abraham Lincoln: Vampire Hunter and The Book of Eli, and commercials for the video games Homefront, Star Wars: The Old Republic and Binary Domain, as well as trailers for the TV shows The Legend of Korra and Terra Nova.
- Invincible was used in a commercial for HBO's Game of Thrones.
- Velocitron was used in commercials for Harry Potter and the Deathly Hallows – Part 2 and a commercial for the video game Assassin's Creed Brotherhood.
- Titan Dune was used in the theatrical trailer for Prince of Persia: The Sands of Time (film).
- Ironwing was used in the launch trailer for Bulletstorm.
- Dark Harbor was used in a trailer for Game of Thrones.
- Norwegian Pirate was used in the Character Progression trailer for the Smuggler class of Star Wars: The Old Republic.
- Magnan Imus was used in the second trailer for the first season of Penny Dreadful (TV series).
- Freefall was used for the entrance music of WWE wrestler Daniel Bryan in 2011.
