= Beijing Rocks =

2001 Hong Kong film by Mabel Cheung

- DVD cover
- 北京樂與路
- Directed by: Mabel Cheung
- Written by: Alex Law
- Produced by: John Chong; Alex Law
- Starring: Le Geng; Richard Ng; Shu Qi; Daniel Wu
- Cinematography: Peter Pau
- Edited by: Danny Pang Phat
- Music by: Henry Lai Wan-man
- Production company: Media Asia Films
- Distributed by: Media Asia Distribution
- Release date: 25 October 2001 (Hong Kong)
- Running time: 110 minutes
- Country: China (Hong Kong)
- Language: Mandarin
- Box office

Chinese name
- Traditional Chinese: 北京樂與路
- Simplified Chinese: 北京乐与路
Transcriptions
Standard Mandarin
- Hanyu Pinyin: Běi Jīng Lè Yǔ Lù
Yue: Cantonese
- Jyutping: Bak1 Ging1 Lok6 Jyu5 Lou6

Beijing Rocks (Chinese: 北京樂與路) is a 2001 Hong Kong film directed by award-winning director Mabel Cheung about the rock and roll music scene in Beijing. Starring Shu Qi and Daniel Wu, it was nominated for five Hong Kong Film Awards including Best Picture and Best Cinematography.

== Cast and roles ==
- Geng Le - Road
- Richard Ng - Wu De-hui
- Shu Qi - Yang Yin
- Daniel Wu - Michael Wu
- Faye Yu
- Henry Ng

== Production and backlash ==
Director Mabel Cheung began production in Beijing in early 2000, interviewing indie rock bands in Shucun, Beijing. Numerous bands provided advice on their lifestyle, mannerisms and costume choices.

However, on 14 October 2000, a list of 10 indie bands from the indie rock community in Shucun issued the "Shucun Statement" (树村声明). It expressed the disappointment of the rock bands during the production process. "We could change a line or a character's hairstyle, but we cannot change the shallowness and the crave for novelty in commercial filmmaking, since we could not make the creator (of the film) understand why we make such music and lifestyle choices." The bands went on to proclaim the end of their involvement with the film so as to not kill off their own image.
