= Illusions (Thomas Bergersen album) =

Studio album by Thomas J. Bergersen
- Released: 22 June 2011
- Genre: World music
- Length: 1:19:34

Thomas J. Bergersen chronology
Illusions (2011)	Sun (2014)

Illusions is the first studio album by Norwegian composer Thomas J. Bergersen, of Two Steps From Hell fame. It was released in June 2011. It consists of 19 tracks and features vocal performances by Vladislava Vasileva, Elitsa Todorova, Merethe Soltvedt, Kate St. Pierre, Jenifer Thigpen and Colin O'Malley, as well as instrumental performances by cellist Tina Guo, and the Capellen Orchestra. The album cover and artwork are designed by Jesper Krijgsman, inspired by visuals from Beauty and the Beast. Initially a digital release, the CD was made available in March 2012. It has sold over 1 million copies worldwide.

It took Bergersen around three years to produce the album. It began with him setting aside compositions he had originally created for Two Steps from Hell but which he ultimately felt were not in keeping with the group's style; he self described the compositions as "all the wonderful musical wonders of the world together in a big collective hug". Originally under the working title of Nemesis II, he confirmed its final title as Illusions in September 2010. Four preview tracks were released in February 2011, with all proceeds going to the relief fund for the 2011 Tōhoku earthquake and tsunami.

In January 2013, the album was released to clients promoting motion picture advertising via Extreme Music, featuring 18 alternative versions of many pieces, which makes 37 tracks in total.

== Track listing ==
All tracks are written by Thomas J. Bergersen.

No.	Title	Length
1.	"Aura"	7:43
2.	"Starvation"	4:27
3.	"Dreammaker" (feat. Vladislava Vasileva)	4:18
4.	"Hurt" (feat. Kate St. Pierre)	1:43
5.	"Ocean Princess" (feat. Merethe Soltvedt)	2:53
6.	"Gift of Life" (feat. Merethe Soltvedt & Tina Guo)	3:22
7.	"Rada" (feat. Vladislava Vasileva)	4:23
8.	"A Place in Heaven" (feat. Jenifer Thigpen)	4:16
9.	"Merchant Prince" (feat. Merethe Soltvedt & Kate St. Pierre)	2:26
10.	"Promise" (feat. Merethe Soltvedt & Tina Guo)	4:59
11.	"Femme fatale" (feat. Vladislava Vasileva)	4:12
12.	"Homecoming"	2:57
13.	"Immortal" (feat. Merethe Soltvedt)	4:08
14.	"Remember Me" (feat. Merethe Soltvedt)	4:30
15.	"Sonera" (feat. Colin O'Malley & Jenifer Thigpen)	5:37
16.	"Reborn" (feat. Kate St. Pierre)	3:53
17.	"Age of Gods"	2:30
18.	"Illusions" (feat. Kate St. Pierre)	8:02
19.	"Soulseeker" (feat. Elitsa Todorova)	3:15

== Critical reception ==
IFMCA-associated reviews website, MundoBSO, was positive, describing it as "intense and at times beautiful... music that navigates various sources that the author surely takes advantage of to find -and expose- his own style." It was rated seven out of ten stars.

Alejandro Clavijo, of ReviewsNewAge, was very positive, stating, "during those three years, Bergersen has played with the melodies until he found the perfect music in the nineteen pieces that make it up. A marvel." He concluded, "the quality and strength that are presented in this work are evident from the first seconds of listening to the touch of the last note." It was subsequently nominated for the outlet's "Album of the Year" award for 2012.

== Charts ==
Chart (2012)	Peak position
US World Albums (Billboard)	13

== Use in media ==
Thomas Bergersen's music has been licensed for several trailers.

- Sonera was used in the Cloud Atlas trailer.
- Reborn was used in the launch trailer for Medal of Honor: Warfighter.
- Hurt and Rada were used in the Metal Gear Rising: Revengeance trailer.
- Remember Me and Dreammaker were used in the documentary, Star Trek: Secrets of the Universe.
- Soulseeker was used by 2012 Olympic Uneven Bars Champion, Aliya Mustafina, as her floor piece for the 2013 World Artistic Gymnastics Championships in Antwerp, Belgium. It was also used as music for a group dance during Season 8 of the popular show, Dance Moms.
- Illusions was played in "The Masterpiece" concert with Uyanga being featured with her vocals.
- Ocean Princess was used by Kenichi Ebina in his performances en route to his victory in the reality show, America's Got Talent.
- Starvation was used as the opening theme for the 5th season and 6th season of Survivor Greece.
- Immortal and Merchant prince are played in the show Le bal des oiseaux fantômes in the French theme park Le Puy du Fou.
- Immortal is also played at the campaign events of the 2022 French Presidential Election candidate Eric Zemmour.
- Promise was used during the opening ceremony of the Gwangju 2015 Summer Universiade.
- Aura and Remember Me was used in Marc Spelmann's act in Britain's Got Talent.
