= Battlecry (Two Steps from Hell album) =

Studio album by Two Steps from Hell
- Released: April 28, 2015
- Length: 1:36:24
- Producer: Thomas Bergersen, Nick Phoenix

Two Steps from Hell chronology
Miracles (2014)	Battlecry (2015)	Classics Volume Two (2015)

Battlecry is the seventh studio album by the group Two Steps from Hell, released on 28 April 2015. It consists of 26 tracks written by composers Thomas J. Bergersen and Nick Phoenix. The album features all-new tracks, except for Amaria from the demonstration album of the same name. It features vocal performances by Merethe Soltvedt, Nick Phoenix and Felicia Farerre.

Battlecry is the first public album by Two Steps from Hell released on two discs and furthermore the first public release to feature instrumental versions of two tracks. The cover artwork and the sleeve are designed by Steven R. Gilmore.

It was the group's first album to peak at number 1 on the US Classical Albums chart as well as the first to feature on the Billboard 200, having sold 3,000 copies in the United States in its first week.

The album was later re-released in 2017 as Battlecry Anthology, featuring instrumental and orchestral versions of all the tracks from the original album.

== Track listing ==
Cannon in D Minor was first uploaded to YouTube in 2014 by Four For Music, Ltd. as a demonstration track for their collaboration with Two Steps from Hell.

The original version of None Shall Live is also available as a commercial single entitled Children of the Sun, featuring vocals by Merethe Soltvedt.

Victory became the first track to surpass 100 million views on the group's official YouTube channel.

The cut track Chosen One was ultimately released in 2020 as L'Appel Du Vide on Bergersen's solo album, Humanity - Chapter I.

Disc 1

No.	Title	Writer(s)	Length
1.	"None Shall Live"	Thomas J. Bergersen	2:19
2.	"Stormkeeper"	Nick Phoenix	2:55
3.	"Victory" (feat. Merethe Soltvedt)	Thomas J. Bergersen	5:20
4.	"Wolf King" (feat. Felicia Farerre)	Nick Phoenix	4:14
5.	"Rise Above" (feat. Merethe Soltvedt)	Thomas J. Bergersen	3:24
6.	"Spellcaster"	Nick Phoenix	3:01
7.	"Never Back Down"	Thomas J. Bergersen	2:55
8.	"Red Tower" (feat. Merethe Soltvedt & Felicia Farerre)	Nick Phoenix	3:08
9.	"Cannon in D Minor"	Thomas J. Bergersen	3:03
10.	"Blackout" (feat. Felicia Farerre)	Nick Phoenix	3:45
11.	"Stronger Faster Braver"	Thomas J. Bergersen	4:38

Disc 2

No.	Title	Writer(s)	Length
12.	"Battleborne" (feat. Merethe Soltvedt, Felicia Farerre & Nick Phoenix)	Nick Phoenix	4:59
13.	"Last of the Light"	Thomas J. Bergersen	2:53
14.	"Ultraground"	Nick Phoenix	3:10
15.	"Release Me"	Thomas J. Bergersen	4:03
16.	"Freedom Ship" (feat. Merethe Soltvedt & Felicia Farerre)	Nick Phoenix	3:22
17.	"Amaria" (Originally "Welcome to Amaria" from Amaria)	Thomas J. Bergersen	3:14
18.	"Flight of the Silverbird"	Thomas J. Bergersen	3:31
19.	"Outpost" (feat. Merethe Soltvedt & Felicia Farerre)	Nick Phoenix	2:58
20.	"Unforgiven"	Thomas J. Bergersen	4:10
21.	"Across the Blood Water" (feat. Felicia Farerre)	Nick Phoenix	3:33
22.	"No Honor in Blood"	Thomas J. Bergersen	3:07
23.	"Sariel" (feat. Felicia Farerre)	Nick Phoenix	2:49
24.	"Star Sky" (feat. Felicia Farerre)	Thomas J. Bergersen	5:30
25.	"Battleborne (Instrumental)"	Nick Phoenix	4:59
26.	"Star Sky (Instrumental)"	Thomas J. Bergersen	5:34

Tracks exclusive to Extreme Music

No.	Title	Writer(s)	Length
25.	"That's a Wrap"	Thomas J. Bergersen	10:00
26.	"Children of the Sun" (feat. Merethe Soltvedt)	Thomas J. Bergersen	4:42

Cut tracks

No.	Title	Writer(s)	Length
25.	"Chosen One"	Thomas J. Bergersen	5:06
26.	"Chosen One (Instrumental Mix)"	Thomas J. Bergersen	5:04

== Critical reception ==
James Monger of AllMusic reviewed the album positively, describing it as "death-defying gymnastic routine-ready pieces of expertly crafted, epically presented audio melodrama".

Ryan Book of Music Times was more ambivalent, initially saying, "the collection seems ready for [a] music video featuring dragons, wizards and epic battles" and comparing its "Gaelic style" favourably to scores by Hans Zimmer and Howard Shore. However he finished his critique with, "orchestral music buffs won't be too keen... but perhaps fans of Nightwish and other symphonic metal might be able to appreciate the album as a whole."

IFMCA-associated reviews website, MundoBSO, highlighted its "great melodic power" and rated it seven out of ten stars.

== Charts ==
=== Weekly charts ===
Chart (2015)	Peak position
Belgian Albums (Ultratop Flanders)	123
Belgian Albums (Ultratop Wallonia)	123
Belgian Classical Albums (Ultratop Flanders)	3
Belgian Classical Albums (Ultratop Wallonia)	1
UK Independent Albums (OCC)	44
UK Independent Album Breakers (OCC)	9
US Billboard 200	183
US Classical Albums (Billboard)	1
US Classical Crossover Albums (Billboard)	1
US Heatseekers Albums (Billboard)	1
US Independent Albums (Billboard)	9
US Top Sales (Billboard)	82

==== Anthology re-release ====
Chart (2017)	Peak position
US Classical Albums (Billboard)	15
US Classical Crossover Albums (Billboard)	12

=== Year-end charts ===
Chart (2015)	Position
US Classical Albums (Billboard)	24
US Classical Crossover Albums (Billboard)	14

Chart (2016)	Position
US Classical Albums (Billboard)	43

Chart (2022)	Position
Belgian Classical Albums (Ultratop Wallonia)	44

== Use in media ==
The tracks from Two Steps from Hell are frequently used in film trailers and other promotional materials:

- "Last of the Light" and "Unforgiven" were used for two trailers of Uncharted 4.
- "None Shall Live" was used in the Captain America: Civil War "Hero Gear" commercial and trailers for the Ultimate Edition of Batman v Superman: Dawn of Justice, Teenage Mutant Ninja Turtles Season 4, Aquaman and The Witcher 3: Hearts of Stone. It was also used in two episodes of the Netflix original series Trollhunters.
- "Flight of the Silverbird" was performed at the 2017 annual Edinburgh Royal Military Tattoo.
- "Battleborne" and "Star Sky" were used in Ubisoft's Watch Dogs 2, during sailboat races mini-game.
- "Victory" was used in the NOVA/PBS documentary Day the Dinosaurs Died, during the introduction of the Chicxulub crater at 10:25.
- "Star Sky" was used in an episode of 60 Minutes Australia.
- "Victory" was used by TSN in Canada for their coverage of the 2026 FIFA World Cup
