= Archangel (Two Steps from Hell album) =

Studio album by Two Steps from Hell
- Released: September 20, 2011
- Recorded: 2006–2010
- Length: 1:12:38
- Producer: Thomas Bergersen, Nick Phoenix

Two Steps from Hell chronology
Invincible (2010)	Archangel (2011)	Halloween (2012)

Archangel is the second public album by the group Two Steps from Hell, released in September 2011. It consists of 26 tracks written by composers Thomas J. Bergersen and Nick Phoenix. All the tracks are from prior demonstration albums previously only available to the industry; 14 are from the album, Nero.

The cover and sleeve are designed by Steven R. Gilmore.

== Track listing ==
No.	Title	Writer(s)	From the original demo album:	Length
1.	"Mercy in Darkness"	Nick Phoenix	Dreams & Imaginations	1:11
2.	"Archangel"	Thomas J. Bergersen	Nero	2:35
3.	"Everlasting"	Nick Phoenix	Nero	2:49
4.	"United We Stand, Divided We Fall"	Thomas J. Bergersen	Nero	3:58
5.	"Love & Loss"	Thomas J. Bergersen	Dynasty	1:49
6.	"The Last Stand"	Nick Phoenix	Nero	2:50
7.	"Nero"	Thomas J. Bergersen	Nero	3:27
8.	"Destructo"	Nick Phoenix	Nero	2:32
9.	"Atlantis"	Thomas J. Bergersen	Nemesis	1:57
10.	"Strength of a Thousand Men"	Thomas J. Bergersen	Nero	2:17
11.	"Unexplained Forces"	Nick Phoenix	Nero	3:11
12.	"Magic of Love"	Thomas J. Bergersen	Nero	2:20
13.	"Norwegian Pirate"	Thomas J. Bergersen	Power of Darkness	3:03
14.	"Dark Harbor"	Nick Phoenix	Power of Darkness	3:15
15.	"Dragon Rider"	Thomas J. Bergersen	Dynasty	1:54
16.	"Mountains from Water"	Nick Phoenix	Nero	2:14
17.	"Titan Dune"	Thomas J. Bergersen	Power of Darkness	2:11
18.	"Ironwing"	Nick Phoenix	Power of Darkness	2:38
19.	"Army of Justice"	Thomas J. Bergersen	Nemesis	2:04
20.	"Immortal Avenger"	Nick Phoenix	Nero	3:44
21.	"He Who Brings the Night"	Thomas J. Bergersen	Power of Darkness	3:07
22.	"Caradhras"	Nick Phoenix	Nero	4:13
23.	"Sanctuary Is Lost"	Nick Phoenix	Nero	2:05
24.	"What's Happening to Me"	Thomas J. Bergersen	Power of Darkness	3:10
25.	"Aesir"	Nick Phoenix	Nero	4:50
26.	"Friendship to Last"	Thomas J. Bergersen	Nemesis	3:13

== Critical reception ==
James Monger of AllMusic reviewed the album favourably, saying it "offers up another explosive set of soaring mini-epics". He rated it three and a half out of five stars.

The critique at IFMCA-associated reviews website, MundoBSO, was positive, saying, "it is a sumptuous creation, of enormous orchestral, melodic, vocal and choral intensity, where the beauty of the celestial and the strength and power of the Averno are recreated. Very spectacular and with more than brilliant moments." It was rated seven out of ten stars.

== Charts ==
Chart (2011–13)	Peak position
US Classical Albums (Billboard)	36
US Heatseekers Albums (Billboard)	28

== Use in media ==
The tracks from Two Steps from Hell are frequently used in film trailers and other promotional materials. This non-exhaustive list includes notable use of tracks from Archangel:

- "Mercy in Darkness" was used in the official trailer for Twilight.
- "Nero" was used in the official trailer for Anna Karenina, the official trailer for The Man Who Knew Infinity, and in a trailer for the Channel 4 mini-series, New Worlds. It was also used in the Top Gear special "The Perfect Road Trip", and the ending credits of Manila Bulletin's official "Lupang Hinirang 2015". As of 2022 "Nero" plays as part of the entrance music loop at EPCOT at Walt Disney World in Orlando, FL.
- "Mountains From Water" was used in the Quarterback Concussion sketch by Key & Peele.
- "Strength of a Thousand Men" (the main part) formed the final part of the accompaniment to the Russian Federation's women's synchronised swimming group that won the gold medal at the 2016 Olympic Games. This was also used as the floor exercise music for Elsabeth Black from 2017–18, which included her performance in winning the all-around silver medal at the 2017 World Artistic Gymnastics Championships. It was also used in a trailer for Avatar: The Last Airbender and in the launch trailer for the "Omega" DLC of Mass Effect 3.
- "Magic of Love" was used in the Harriet Tubman: Freedom Runner sketch by Key & Peele.
- "United We Stand – Divided We Fall" was used in an update trailer for Star Wars: The Old Republic.
- "Love & Loss" was used in the trailer for The Twilight Saga: Breaking Dawn – Part 1, in a trailer for Mass Effect 3, and for a mid-season premiere trailer of The Walking Dead. It was also used in a trailer for the Disneynature documentary film Earth. Swiss artistic gymnast Giulia Steingruber used this song as her floor music in 2013.
- "The Last Stand" was used for National Geographic Channel's documentary Mission Pluto, and in the launch trailer for the "Earth" DLC of Mass Effect 3 Multiplayer.
- "Ironwing" was used in the launch trailer for Bulletstorm.
- "Dark Harbor" was used in a trailer for Game of Thrones.
- "Titan Dune" was used in a trailer for Prince of Persia: The Sands of Time.
- "Army of Justice" was played during the 2012 Olympic Games.
- "Norwegian Pirate" was used in the "Character Progression – Smuggler" trailer for Star Wars: The Old Republic.
- "Archangel" was used in:
  - a trailer for an episode of Doctor Who;
  - a trailer for the Merlin series 5 finale;
  - a trailer for the fantasy series Once Upon a Time in Wonderland;
  - in the May 18, 2013 episode of Britain's Got Talent;
  - in the story trailer for Assassin's Creed IV: Black Flag;
  - in a commercial for the Star Wars mini-series Lego Star Wars: Droid Tales;
  - for the season 2 finale of Marvel's Avengers Assemble;
  - it was also considered for use in a trailer for Avatar but was ultimately not used.
  - starting at the end of the 2013 UEFA Champions League final and returning in the 2018 final, the track is now used for the trophy presentation for the competition winners starting from the 2019 final.
