= Two Steps from Hell =

American trailer music company

- Official logo
- Type: Private
- Industry: Production music
- Founded: 14 February 2006
- Founders: Thomas Bergersen; Nick Phoenix
- Fate: De facto dissolution 8 April 2024
- Headquarters: Los Angeles, California, United States
- Products: Trailer music Commercial music E-books; Merchandise

Two Steps from Hell was an American production music company based in Los Angeles. It was founded in 2006 by Thomas Bergersen and Nick Phoenix, a pair of composers born in Norway and England, respectively. They created the company to make trailer music demos to be circulated exclusively within the movie advertising industry for the purpose of licensing, and were partnered with Extreme Music, which handled licensing arrangements. The duo were among the most successful in their field, having supplied background tracks for thousands of film trailers and TV commercials. They composed separately but released their creations together. Typically, their music was orchestral and choral based, but with modern complements and structured similar to pop songs. The stentorian nature of their works led the frequent use of a contemporary label, "epic music", to define their style.

They established themselves as a major player in the market of the late 2000s, providing tracks to trailers for major film franchises such as Harry Potter, Pirates of the Caribbean, Star Trek and Twilight. As the public became exposed to their music, the pair gained a cult following online who pleaded for their compositions to be made available to purchase; Two Steps from Hell soon released their first two public albums, Invincible (2010) and Archangel (2011), collections of their most popular demo music to date. These were followed by the album SkyWorld (2012), this time consisting entirely of brand new music straight to commercial release. With these albums all successful, the duo organized their first concert, at Walt Disney Concert Hall, in 2013.

As demand for traditional trailer music in the movie industry waned in the mid-2010s, the pair focused increasingly on creating further public albums consisting of new and more varied compositions, with less emphasis on composing demos for trailers, while continuing to release more of their back catalog commercially as well. Such music performed well in the United States; 13 of their releases reached the top ten of the Billboard Classical Crossover Albums charts, three of which peaked at number one: Battlecry (2015), Unleashed (2017), and Myth (2022), the first also charting on the Billboard 200. The 2020s began with the group consolidating their popularity by organizing their first tours in Europe. In 2024, it was announced that Bergersen and Phoenix were going their separate ways, ending Two Steps from Hell.

== History ==
Two Steps from Hell was founded in early 2006 when Thomas Bergersen and Nick Phoenix joined forces to write original music for movie trailers. The two have composed music for over 1,000 major motion picture trailers.

With the founding of the company in 2006, Bergersen was looking for a name that would draw attention with the old adage in mind, "All PR is good PR." The idea for the name came from "Two Steps From Heaven", a Norwegian nightclub that, according to Bergersen, had a similar theme going on.

Despite the company finding success with its music, the tracks were not officially released to the public until the May 2010 release of the commercial album Invincible. Invincible was approaching Gold record status. As of January 2017, Two Steps from Hell has published 10 public albums in addition to 20 demonstration albums, with almost 1,000 unique tracks in total.

Invincible was followed by Bergersen's first solo album, Illusions, then Archangel and Halloween, both primarily compilation albums of industry tracks. Next, SkyWorld was released as the first public album to feature mostly new tracks, followed by the primarily compilation albums Classics Volume One and Miracles.

In 2013 Nick Phoenix released his first solo album, Speed of Sound.

The album Sun, which was released on September 30, 2014, is the second solo album from Thomas Bergersen. Preview tracks were released from the album, titled "Cry" and "Sun", the former of which can be downloaded from Bergersen's official website. An official music video for "Sun" was also released on YouTube, preceding the announcement of a signed limited deluxe edition CD release set to include additional tracks and notes from Thomas, as well as a large-size poster featuring his artwork.

Additionally, in July 2014 Two Steps from Hell released an e-book known as Colin Frake on Fire Mountain, which features a 75,000-word novel written by Nick Phoenix with illustrations by Otto Bjornik, as well as an original score also made available via a soundtrack release. A sequel entitled Colin Frake: Asclepius was released in April 2017.

2015 saw the release of Battlecry featuring all new songs. This album proved to be a huge success for the company, charting at position 183 on the US Billboard 200. This was followed by the compilation album Classics Volume Two in 2015, and the all new albums Vanquish, Unleashed, and Dragon in 2016, 2017, and 2019 respectively.

In 2020 Bergersen released the first two chapters (out of seven) of his Humanity album. These featured mostly new tracks, with several reworked tracks from older releases.

Two Steps from Hell's main graphic artist is Steven Gilmore, who has created album covers for almost every promotional and public release, including the logo of the company, with the only exception being the 2009 DVD release of their library, for which the album cover was created by Paul Zeaiter. Additionally, Thomas Bergersen's Illusions solo album features design by Jesper Krijgsman, while its sequel, Sun, features artwork created by Thomas himself.

Their success has also been reflected in platforms such as YouTube, where they have millions of subscribers and over a hundred million views on popular soundtracks such as "Victory".

=== Main appearances ===
The company's music has been featured in:

- Trailers for, but not limited to: Harry Potter and the Order of the Phoenix, Harry Potter and the Deathly Hallows – Part 1, Harry Potter and the Deathly Hallows – Part 2, Star Trek, Star Trek Into Darkness, The Dark Knight, The Fighter, Rise of the Planet of the Apes, Tron: Legacy, Anna Karenina, No Country for Old Men, 2012, Captain America: The First Avenger, The Avengers, X-Men: First Class, X-Men: Days of Future Past, Pirates of the Caribbean: At World's End, Super 8, Inception, World War Z, Inkheart, The Chronicles of Narnia: The Voyage of the Dawn Treader, Lincoln, WALL-E, Up, The Twilight Saga: Eclipse, Hugo, The Town, Priest, Prince of Persia: The Sands of Time, Interstellar, The Man Who Knew Infinity, Neon Genesis Evangelion, Batman v Superman: Dawn of Justice, and Aquaman. The track "Everlasting" was also used within the documentary "Planet Earth".
- Video games such as Might & Magic Heroes VII (Entrance cinematic), Resident Evil 6, Mass Effect 2, Mass Effect 3 (Taking Back Earth trailer, Black Blade, After the Fall), PlanetSide 2, Killzone 3, Star Wars: The Old Republic, Just Dance 2 (Professor Pumplestickle), Elder Scrolls Online, League of Legends (E-sports tournaments; Various Pieces from the Burn album), The Witcher 3 (A Night to Remember Trailer; A Hole in the Sun), F1 2013, Assassin's Creed IV: Black Flag, Uncharted 4, Mount & Blade II: Bannerlord, and Cities: Skylines II.
- Television series such as Breaking Bad, Doctor Who, Game of Thrones, Sherlock, I'm a Celebrity...Get Me Out of Here!, Revolution, Homeland, The Walking Dead, Supernatural, Merlin, Trollhunters: Tales of Arcadia, Amphibia, Deadliest Warrior, Nathan for You, The World Wars, Wild Planet: North America, Love Island USA, and during the 2012 London Olympics. The track "Archangel", from the album of the same name, was also used in an episode of Britain's Got Talent. The track "Nero" was also used in the Top Gear special: "The Perfect Road Trip", in the series "Heart of Courage" was used in season 17, episode 3 and in season 18, episode 4, and “Black Blade” was used in season 19, episode 2, and season 21, episode 4. The track "Norwegian Pirate" was also used as the main theme of TBS's sports gameshow Sports Danshi Grand Prix, which was the reboot version of the former sports gameshow Pro Sportsman No.1.

=== Concerts ===
Two Steps from Hell hosted a live concert on June 14, 2013, at the Disney Hall, in Los Angeles, California, performing some of their most popular songs, such as "Heart of Courage", "Protectors of the Earth", "To Glory", "Strength of a Thousand Men", "Black Blade", and "Breathe", as well as "Ocean Princess", '"Age of Gods", and "Remember Me" from Bergersen's album Illusions.

The second live concert happened on April 20, 2018, and was organized by the Film Music Prague Festival. The concert was performed by Praga Sinfonietta, which was conducted by Petr Pololáník, Kühns mixed choir, Merethe Soltvedt and Kamila Nývltová as solo singers. Thomas Bergersen participated on several songs playing on violin or piano. Performed were these songs: "Strength of a Thousand Men", "Fill My Heart", "Protectors of Earth", "Everlasting", "Heart of Courage", "Fire Nation", "Ocean Princess", "Master of Shadows", "Flight of the Silverbird", "Blackout", "Winterspell", "Stormkeeper", "Evergreen", "Neverdark", "Victory", "Fall of the Fountain World", "To Glory", and as an encore "Remember Me".

2020 was supposed to see the start of the Two Steps from Hell European tour, but this was postponed due to the COVID-19 pandemic.

On June 15, 2022, Two Steps from Hell started their European tour in Brussels and visited other European cities. The concerts were performed by Odesa Opera Orchestra assisted by ReChoir, a professional Polish choir. Thomas Bergersen and Nick Phoenix participated on several songs. The performances were recorded for the album Live – An Epic Music Experience, their sole live release which features live renditions of the most popular tracks from their catalog, including "Heart of Courage," "Victory," "Star Sky," "Protectors of the Earth," and "Strength of a Thousand Men."

== Discography ==
=== Commercial albums ===
US charts key:
- 200 – Billboard 200
- CLS – Classical Albums
- CLX – Classical Crossover Albums
- HEA – Heatseekers Albums
- IND – Independent Albums

==== Studio albums ====
The group's paramount publicly released music:

Title	Year	Summary	Peak US chart positions				
Title	Year	Summary	200	CLS	CLX	HEA	IND
Invincible	2010	First collection of popular tracks from previously private demo albums. (Note: Also features a negligible number of all-new tracks straight to public release.)	—	—	—	—	—
Archangel	2011	Second collection of popular tracks from previously private demo albums.	—	36	—	28	—
Halloween	2012	Themed album. Collection of horror tracks from previously private demo albums.	—	—	—	—	—
SkyWorld	2012	First album consisting entirely of new tracks straight to public release. (Note: Also features a negligible number of tracks from previously private demo albums.)	—	10	9	19	—
Classics Volume One	2013	Third collection of popular tracks from previously private demo albums.	—	10	9	23	—
Miracles	2014	Themed album. Collection of dreamy/ethereal tracks from previously private demo albums.	—	3	2	9	—
Battlecry	2015	Second album consisting entirely of new tracks straight to public release.	183	1	1	1	9
Classics Volume Two	2015	Fourth collection of popular tracks from previously private demo albums, plus 10 new tracks.	—	7	6	—	—
Vanquish	2016	Third album consisting entirely of new tracks straight to public release.	—	9	8	5	34
Unleashed	2017	Fourth album consisting entirely of new tracks straight to public release.	—	1	1	18	41
Dragon	2019	Fifth album consisting entirely of new tracks straight to public release.	—	2	2	12	29
Myth	2022	Sixth album consisting entirely of new tracks straight to public release.	—	17	1	—	—
"—" denotes releases that did not chart, are unknown to have charted, or were not released in that territory.

==== Solo albums ====
Albums created by only one composer; "part of the Two Steps catalog", but released under the individual composer's name:

Title	Year	Creator	Summary	Peak US chart positions				
Title	Year	Creator	Summary	200	CLS	CLX	HEA	IND
Illusions	2011	Bergersen	First solo studio album.	—	13 (Note: This figure actually refers to the World Albums chart position, as it was not classified on the Classical Albums chart.)	—	—	—
Speed of Sound	2013	Phoenix	First solo studio album. Epic sci-fi electronica and orchestral music.	—	—	—	—	—
Sun	2014	Bergersen	Second solo studio album. Follow-up to Illusions.	157	3	3	3	27
American Dream	2018	Bergersen	First symphonic suite.	—	6	6	—	—
Seven	2019	Bergersen	Second symphonic suite.	—	1	1	15	39
Humanity - Chapter I	2020	Bergersen	First in seven album series; third solo studio album. Start of follow-up to Sun.	—	—	3	—	—
Humanity - Chapter II	2020	Bergersen	Second in seven album series; fourth solo studio album.	—	—	4	—	—
King of One	2021	Phoenix	Second solo studio album. Mix of classic and modern rock.	—	—	—	—	—
Humanity - Chapter III	2021	Bergersen	Third in seven album series; fifth solo studio album.	—	—	—	—	—
Humanity - Chapter IV	2021	Bergersen	Fourth in seven album series; sixth solo studio album.	—	—	4	—	—
Wide World	2022	Phoenix	Third solo studio album. Follow-up to King of One. Classic rock; big orchestra.	—	—	—	—	—
Humanity - Chapter V	2023	Bergersen	Fifth in seven album series; seventh solo studio album.	—	—	3	—	—
Underdog	2024	Phoenix	Fourth solo studio album. Follow-up to Wide World. Rock.	—	—	—	—	—
Heart of the Ocean	2024	Phoenix	Fifth solo studio album. Epic and orchestral music. Consists of new tracks straight to public release.	—	—	—	—	—
Insurgent	2024	Phoenix	Public release of parts of the demo albums Insugrent, Mind Tracer and Open Conspiracy.	—	—	—	—	—
A Christmas Carol	2024	Bergersen	Third symphonic suite.					
It Starts at Zero	2025	Phoenix	Sixth solo album consisting entirely of new tracks.					
Dawnstar	2025	Phoenix	Seventh solo album consisting entirely of new tracks.					
Humanity - Chapter VI	2026	Bergersen	Sixth in seven album series; eighth solo studio album. Set to release in July 2026.	Not yet released.				
Humanity - Chapter VII	TBA	Bergersen	Seventh in seven album series; ninth solo studio album. Future release.	Not yet released.				
Creatures of the Forest	TBA	Bergersen	Details TBA. Future release.	Not yet released.				
"—" denotes releases that did not chart, are unknown to have charted, or were not released in that territory.

==== Anthology series ====
A series of previously private demo albums released for public purchase; modified to consist of just their residual tracks not yet available on other public studio albums:

Title	Year	Summary	Peak charts	
Title	Year	Summary	CLS	CLX
Battlecry Anthology	2017	All Battlecry alternative version tracks not previously commercially available.	15	12
Nero Anthology	2017	Most of the remaining Nero back catalog yet to be made commercially available.	15	12
Heaven Anthology	2017	All of the remaining Two Steps From Heaven back catalog yet to be made commercially available.	6	4
Power of Darkness Anthology	2017	Most of the remaining Power of Darkness back catalog yet to be made commercially available.	10	9
Illumina Anthology	2018	All of the remaining Illumina back catalog yet to be made commercially available.	23	15
Legend Anthology	2019	Most of the remaining Legend back catalog yet to be made commercially available.	19	—
Dreams & Imaginations Anthology	2020	Most of the remaining Dreams & Imaginations back catalog yet to be made commercially available.	—	—
"—" denotes releases that did not chart, are unknown to have charted, or were not released in that territory.

==== Soundtracks ====
Albums featuring the group as the composers of another media's soundtrack:

Title	Year	Summary	Peak charts	
Title	Year	Summary	CLS	CLX
Colin Frake on Fire Mountain	2014	Standalone release of the soundtrack for the e-book of the same name.	22	10

==== Live albums ====
Albums consisting of tracks recorded live:

Title	Year	Summary	Peak charts	
Title	Year	Summary	CLS	CLX
Live – An Epic Music Experience	2022	Live recordings of tracks performed during their 2022 European concert tour.	—	5
"—" denotes releases that did not chart, are unknown to have charted, or were not released in that territory.

==== Japan-exclusive albums ====
Albums compiled for release only in Japan:

Title	Year	Summary
Legacy	2015	Compilation of popular tracks from all public albums as of release date.
Impossible	2018	Compilation of popular tracks from all public albums released since Legacy.

==== Mobile-exclusive albums ====
Miscellaneous albums only available on mobile devices:

Title	Year	Summary
Demon's Dance	2012	Collection of tracks from previously private demo albums; only available via the group's (since discontinued) mobile app.
Two Steps from Hell: Ringtones	2016	Collection of popular tracks, edited/truncated for use as ringtones; only available via Google Play. Since discontinued.

=== Demonstration albums ===
==== Main catalog ====
The group's demo albums released exclusively to clients in the motion picture and advertising industry for the purpose of licensing. Much of the music originating from these demos has since been made available for public purchase on the commercial albums listed above.

Title	Year	Summary
Volume One	2006	First ever album, featuring various genres.
Shadows and Nightmares	2006	Horror genre album, and a sound effects library.
Dynasty	2007	Epic genre album.
All Drums Go to Hell	2007	Percussion album.
Pathogen	2007	Science-fantasy/metal album, composed by Phoenix.
Nemesis	2007	Epic genre album, composed by Bergersen.
Dreams & Imaginations	2008	New-age album.
Legend	2008	Epic genre album, with some tracks composed by Troels Folmann.
Ashes	2008	Horror genre album.
The Devil Wears Nada	2009	Light-hearted and humorous album.
Power of Darkness	2010	Epic genre album.
All Drones Go to Hell	2010	New-age drones and soundscapes album; also known as Mystical Beginnings.
Illumina	2010	New-age album.
Balls to the Wall	2011	Percussion album, with some tracks composed by Alex Pfeffer.
Nero	2011	Epic genre album, with some tracks composed by Alex Pfeffer.
Two Steps from Heaven	2012	"Inspiring, emotional, and adventurous" album, composed by Bergersen.
Burn	2012	Dubstep remixed tracks, composed by Bergersen.
Cyanide	2013	Percussion album.
Crime Lab	2013	Electronic album.
Open Conspiracy	2014	Electronic-hybrid album, with some tracks composed by Hitesh Ceon and Nick Kaelar.
Amaria	2014	New-age/drama album, composed by Bergersen.
Too Big to Fail	2014	Sound effects library / Trailer toolkit.
Empire	2015	Mostly consists of tracks from Classics Volume Two, composed by Phoenix.
Stronger Faster Braver	2015	"Extreme sports music"; motivational, energetic and driving compositions, composed by Phoenix.
Hammerfist	2017	Percussion album, composed by Bergersen.
Trapstar	2018	Experimental hip-hop album, composed by Phoenix.
Greatest Hits Remastered	2020	Collection of remastered popular tracks from all public albums as of release date.
Catch Me	2020	Vocal music, composed by Bergersen.
Landscapes	2020	Atmospheric drone album, composed by Bergersen
Mind Tracer	2020	Synths and strings album, composed by Phoenix and Hitesh Ceon.
Neon Nights	2020	Electronic and synthwave album, composed by Bergersen and Øivind Rosvold.
Daybreak	2020	Epic/dramatic album, composed by Bergersen.
Insurgent	2021	Electronic-hybrid album, composed by Phoenix and Hitesh Ceon.
Maze of Dreams	2023	Epic/dramatic album composed by Phoenix.

==== Third-party albums ====
A handful of albums have been released under the Two Steps from Hell name which are creations entirely by third-party composers; consequently, they are not considered part of the group's primary catalog:

Title	Year	Summary
Sinners	2010	Electronic rock album, composed by Aleksandar Dimitrijevic.
Faction	2011	Dark drones and soundscapes. Putative creator is Brad Rue.
Solaris	2013	Epic futuristic album, composed by Alex Pfeffer.
Orion	2013	Epic hybrid album, composed by Michał Cielecki.
Quarantine	2014	Sci-fi electronica album, composed by Brad Rue.
Chaos Theory	2020	Epic/dramatic hybrid album, composed by Alex Pfeffer.

=== Singles ===
==== Commercial singles ====
Singles available for public purchase that are not on any public album or were initially released as pre-release tracks. All of the following pieces are written by Bergersen, except where noted:

Title	Year	Summary
"A Place in Heaven"	2011	Pre-release singles from Illusions.
"Ocean Princess"	2011	Pre-release singles from Illusions.
"Starvation"	2011	Pre-release singles from Illusions.
"Promise"	2011	Pre-release singles from Illusions.
"<3"	2011	Made to raise money for the Red Cross in response to the Tōhoku earthquake and tsunami disaster in Japan. Later included as "Heart" on Two Steps from Heaven and Miracles.
"The Hero in Your Heart"	2013	Made to raise money for the Red Cross in response to the Typhoon Haiyan disaster in the Philippines. Lyrics performed by Merethe Soltvedt. Later included on Catch Me.
"Autumn Love"	2014	Emotional, piano-based track.
"That's a Wrap"	2014	Adventurous orchestral track created in ten days, entirely from Bergersen's proprietary sample library.
"Into Darkness"	2014	Fusion of neo-orchestral and EDM styles. Lyrics performed by Bergersen.
"Final Frontier"	2014	From Sun.
"Stay"	2014	Pre-release singles from Miracles.
"Miracles"	2014	Pre-release singles from Miracles.
"Children of the Sun"	2015	The original vocal version of "None Shall Live" from Battlecry; lyrics performed by Merethe Soltvedt.
"Christmas Medley"	2015	Orchestral medley of various Christmas songs. Also known as Two Steps From Xmas.
"Threnody for Europe"	2016	Intended as "a musical contemplation on the current unrest in Europe."
"You Are Light"	2018	Ethereal vocal track; lyrics performed by Felicia Farerre. Later included on Catch Me.
"Imagine"	2018	Ethereal vocal track; lyrics performed by Sonna. Later included on Catch Me.
"In Orbit"	2018	Epic rock vocal track; lyrics performed by Cinda M. Later included on Catch Me.
"Brightest Smile"	2018	Ethereal vocal track; lyrics performed by Natalie Major. Later included on Catch Me.
"Catch Me"	2019	Epic pop vocal track; lyrics performed by Sonna. Later included on Catch Me.
"Next to You"	2019	Ethereal vocal track; lyrics performed by Sonna. Later included on Catch Me.
"Little Star"	2019	Ethereal vocal track; lyrics performed by Audrey Karrasch. Later included on Humanity: Chapter III.
"So Small"	2020	Pre-release single from Humanity; included on Chapter IV.
"The Stars Are Coming Home"	2020	Pre-release single from Humanity; included on Chapter II. Lyrics performed by Audrey Callahan.
"Love Suite"	2021	Pre-release singles from Humanity: Chapter III.
"Red"	2021	Pre-release singles from Humanity: Chapter III.
"Wings for Ukraine"	2022	Made to raise money for UNICEF in response to the Russian invasion of Ukraine. Later included on the EP, Humanity: Songs for Ukraine.
"Shield of Love"	2022	Made to raise money for UNICEF in response to the Russian invasion of Ukraine. Later included on the EP, Humanity: Songs for Ukraine.

==== Non-commercial singles ====
Songs that are not on any public album or were initially made available for public listening via the group's official social media channels, but not available for public purchase at the time of publishing. All of the following pieces are written by Bergersen, except when noted:

Title	Year	Summary
"Bird A Short Lived Life"	2002	Demo tracks created using the EastWest/Quantum Leap Symphonic Orchestra.
"Celebration"	2002	Demo tracks created using the EastWest/Quantum Leap Symphonic Orchestra.
"Underneath the Sea"	2002	Demo tracks created using the EastWest/Quantum Leap Symphonic Orchestra.
"Finding the Treasure"	2003	Demo tracks created using the EastWest/Quantum Leap Symphonic Orchestra.
"Percussion"	2003	Demo tracks created using the EastWest/Quantum Leap Symphonic Orchestra.
"Welcome to Inkareth"	2003	Demo tracks created using the EastWest/Quantum Leap Symphonic Orchestra.
"Rise With the Angels"	2003	Demo tracks created using the Vienna Symphonic Library.
"Evolutionary Progress"	2004	Demo tracks created using the Vienna Symphonic Library.
"Itineris Spiritus"	2005	Demo track created using the EastWest/Quantum Leap Symphonic Choirs. Dedicated to his friend Ryan Miglierina, who died in a car accident.
"Thomas J. Bergersen's first L96 mix"	2007	Demo track created using the Samplicity IR-Library 2: "L96".
"Soaring Over Hollywood"	2009	Demo tracks created using the EastWest/Quantum Leap Hollywood Strings.
"Just Another Happy Ending"	2009	Demo tracks created using the EastWest/Quantum Leap Hollywood Strings.
"Tower of Mischief"	2011	Intended as a preview track from Two Steps from Heaven, instead included on Nero.
"My Freedom"	2011	Considered for release on Illusions, instead included on Nero and Miracles. Lyrics performed by Merethe Soltvedt.
"Benedictus"	2011	Intended as a preview track for Sun, instead included on Two Steps from Heaven.
"Where Are You"	2011	Pop-trance track with acoustic elements. Lyrics performed by Bergersen.
"My Soul, Not Yours"	2012	Experimental dubstep track. Later included as "Not Your Soul" on Burn.
"Hymn to Life"	2012	Published in celebration of Bergersen's birthday. Later performed under the title "Hymnus Vitae Dedicatus".
"To Die on Halloween"	2012	Preview track from Halloween. Composed, and lyrics performed, by Phoenix.
"Sun"	2013	Preview tracks from Sun.
"Cry"	2013	Preview tracks from Sun.
"Colin and Petunia"	2014	Preview track from Colin Frake on Fire Mountain. Retitled as "Colin Frake" for its album release.
"Freedom Ship"	2015	Preview track from Battlecry. Composed by Phoenix.
"Neverdark"	2015	Preview track from Classics Volume Two. Composed by Phoenix.
"Dear Mr. Alien"	2018	Inspired by a news report showing a video of children being shot, whilst censoring the man filming it who was cursing. Bergersen summarized, "this absurd hypocrisy baffles me to no end." Later released on Humanity: Chapter IV.
"One Million Voices"	2019	Published in celebration of one million Facebook fans and as a preview track from Humanity; released on Chapter IV.

== Other media ==
=== E-books ===
Two Steps from Hell have expanded their catalog of creations beyond music by also releasing a series of e-books, each written by Phoenix. All are part of a planned pentalogy of sci-fi fantasy novels called Colin Frake. The series follows the adventures of the adolescent protagonist of the same name, set in the fictional world of "Reanne". Each book is accompanied by an orchestral soundtrack created by the group, and a collection of hand-drawn illustrations by artist Otto Björnik.

Title	Year	Publisher	Pages	Notes
Colin Frake on Fire Mountain	2014	BookBaby	400	Features 46 drawings. Soundtrack had a standalone release in 2014.
Colin Frake: Asclepius	2017	BookBaby	218 (Note: Apple Books state 618 pages and 84 drawings. However, the purchase includes both books one and two packaged together as one single e-book. It can therefore be deduced that book two consists of 218 pages, since book one consists of 400, and features 38 drawings, since book one consists of 46.)	Features 38 drawings. Soundtrack has no standalone release. Purchase also includes book one.
Colin Frake: Sumava	2022	TBA	TBA	Confirmed third book. Future release.
Colin Frake 4	TBA	TBA	TBA	Planned fourth book. Future release.
Colin Frake 5	TBA	TBA	TBA	Planned fifth book. Future release.

=== Mobile app ===
On 5 June 2012, Two Steps from Hell announced they would soon be launching an official mobile app for iOS and Android devices. The app was subsequently released three weeks later. Downloading the app gave users access to "news, promotions... videos, photos and albums", but most notably, 19 tracks of previously private demo music available in a new limited-time digital album called Demon's Dance. Gergely Vilaghy of Trailer Music News concluded that the app's creation was not revolutionary but that "it was unseen in the trailer music scene before". It has since been discontinued.
