= Extreme Music =

British music production company

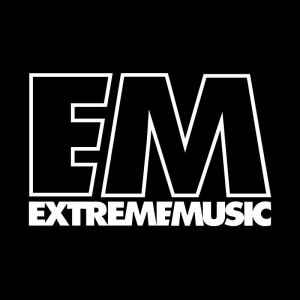
- Type: Subsidiary
- Industry: Music production
- Founded: 1997; 29 years ago
- Founders: Russell Emanuel; Dolphin Taylor
- Headquarters: London, England
- Area served: Worldwide
- Number of employees: 82
- Parent: Viacom (2005; 2005–2008); Sony Music Publishing (2008–present)
- Website: extrememusic.com

Extreme Music is a production music arm of Sony Music Publishing. The company creates and licenses music for use in television, film, advertising and online media. Their library includes music from artists and composers such as Quincy Jones, Hans Zimmer, George Martin, Snoop Dogg, Xzibit, Junkie XL, Labrinth, Ramin Djawadi, Timbaland, Ricky Reed, Brian Tyler, Blues Saraceno, Rodney Jerkins, Eddie Kramer, John Debney, Two Steps from Hell, Andrea Datzman and Dweezil Zappa. Extreme Music is headquartered in London, with its creative operations based in Santa Monica, California. As of 2026, its library contained around 28,000 songs.

== History ==
Extreme Music was founded in London by Russell Emanuel and Dolph Taylor in 1997. Emanuel had played bass with a punk band, Class Ties, and worked a day job as a studio assistant at MCA Music Publishing and Abbey Road Studios. After leaving MCA, Emanuel worked at Bruton, a production music library which produced sound-alike music that was recorded, produced, and licensed inexpensively. He recorded one sound-alike album for Bruton, and financed his band's touring through the royalties the album generated.

Emanuel also managed bands, including Stiff Little Fingers. After beginning a job at a third production library, MatchMusic, Emanuel and Stiff Little Fingers drummer Dolph Taylor began to compose music for MatchMusic together. They built a MIDI suite, and when not on tour, they recorded original tracks that reflected their own musical sensibilities. "We were forever knocking our heads against old-school attitudes and being told that 'This is what the marketplace likes.' But we were seeing a new generation of editors coming into the industry and going to clubs and hearing all these thumping records, and they wanted to know why production music didn't sound like that," Taylor said in a 2003 interview. Taylor and Emanuel decided to approach commercial artists, some of whom they already knew, and ask them to record production music tracks.

With a $100,000 investment from angel investor Mark Levinson, Extreme Music was founded in 1997. The company was positioned to reflect the punk rock ethos of its founders; for example, they mailed condoms to 1,000 music industry executives with packaging that read "Extreme Music: The Only Safe Thing You'll Ever Get From Us." With a focus on production, they "upped the industry ante by using professional recording studios and top-notch musicians."

In August 2005 Extreme Music was bought by Viacom, the then-parent company of CBS, UPN, and Paramount Pictures for $45.1 million, and in 2008 it was acquired by Sony/ATV Music Publishing (now Sony Music Publishing). The terms of the sale were not disclosed.

In January 2013, Extreme introduced Customix, a web application created specifically for music supervisors to quickly customize songs from its library.

Extreme Music tracks have been licensed by editors, music producers and music supervisors at production companies, networks and advertising agencies, including A+E, Fox, BBC, HBO, the NFL and Apple. Among other productions, music from the Extreme library has been used in Mad Men, Ray Donovan, Dancing with the Stars, Birdman, Creed and It's Always Sunny in Philadelphia.

In August 2013, Extreme partnered with composer Hans Zimmer and his business partner, Steve Kofsky, to launch Bleeding Fingers Music. A joint venture, it creates show-specific libraries and scores for unscripted, reality, documentary and light drama television shows. In 2017, it was ranked as the leading custom music scoring company in the industry..
