= Live – An Epic Music Experience =

Live album by Two Steps from Hell
- Released: 4 November 2022
- Recorded: 15 June – 2 July 2022
- Genre: Classical crossover; classical; trailer music
- Length: 123:44
- Label: Sony Classical Records
- Producer: Thomas Bergersen; Nick Phoenix

Two Steps from Hell chronology
Myth (2022)	Live – An Epic Music Experience (2022)

Live – An Epic Music Experience is a live album created by the music production company Two Steps from Hell, released on November 4, 2022. It is distributed by Sony Classical Records digitally, on CD (two discs), and vinyl (three discs). It is the group's first and only live album, and their final commercial release before disbanding in 2024.

The album entirely comprises recordings of songs performed live during concerts forming the group's 2022 European tour, their first concert tour, which concluded four months prior to its release. It consists of all 28 tracks that comprised the tour's setlist, written by composers Thomas J. Bergersen and Nick Phoenix. It features an assortment of songs from the group's entire 16-year catalog, including numerous greatest hits; many were newly arranged (to varying degrees) for the purpose of performing them live in a concert hall and feature as such versions on the album.

Credited artists who performed live on stage with Bergersen and Phoenix include vocalists Úyanga Bold, Merethe Soltvedt, Kamila Nývltová and Rechoir, as well as instrumentalists Esther Abrami, Eliane Correa, Greg Ellis, Skye Emanuel, Helen Nash, Kamila Nývltová, Saulius Petreikis and the Odesa Opera Orchestra.

== Track listing ==
The following shows the track listing of the CD release.

Disc 1

No.	Title	Writer(s)	Original commercial release:	Length
1.	"Empire of Angels (Live)"	Thomas J. Bergersen	Sun	6:41
2.	"Cannon in D Minor (Live)"	Thomas J. Bergersen	Battlecry	3:03
3.	"After the Fall (Live)"	Nick Phoenix	Invincible	2:27
4.	"Unbreakable (Live)"	Thomas J. Bergersen	Dragon	4:20
5.	"Master of Shadows (Live)"	Nick Phoenix	Invincible	3:05
6.	"Fire Nation (Live)"	Nick Phoenix	Invincible	5:01
7.	"Evergreen (Live)"	Thomas J. Bergersen	Vanquish	3:00
8.	"Am I Not Human? (Live)"	Nick Phoenix	Invincible	4:31
9.	"Blackheart (Live)"	Thomas J. Bergersen	SkyWorld	4:24
10.	"Star Sky (Live)"	Thomas J. Bergersen	Battlecry	5:26
11.	"Wings for Ukraine (Live)"	Thomas J. Bergersen	Humanity: Songs for Ukraine	5:15
12.	"Strength of a Thousand Men (Live)"	Thomas J. Bergersen	Archangel	4:09
13.	"Victory (Live)"	Thomas J. Bergersen	Battlecry	5:26
14.	"Wolf King (Live)"	Nick Phoenix	Battlecry	4:03

Disc 2

No.	Title	Writer(s)	Original commercial release:	Length
15.	"Flight of the Silverbird (Live)"	Thomas J. Bergersen	Battlecry	3:24
16.	"Titan Dream (Live)"	Nick Phoenix	SkyWorld	4:03
17.	"Dragon (Live)"	Nick Phoenix	Dragon	3:51
18.	"Remember Me (Live)"	Thomas J. Bergersen	Illusions	5:38
19.	"El Dorado (Live)"	Thomas J. Bergersen	SkyWorld	4:14
20.	"Fall of the Fountain World (Live)"	Nick Phoenix	Vanquish	4:43
21.	"Impossible (Live)"	Thomas J. Bergersen	Unleashed	9:08
22.	"Little Star (Live)"	Thomas J. Bergersen	Humanity: Chapter III	4:33
23.	"New Life (Live)"	Thomas J. Bergersen	Sun	4:39
24.	"Never Give Up On Your Dreams (Live)"	Thomas J. Bergersen	Unleashed	5:10
25.	"Rise Up (Live)"	Nick Phoenix	Wide World	4:47
26.	"Protectors of the Earth (Live)"	Thomas J. Bergersen	Invincible	2:49
27.	"Stormkeeper (Live)"	Nick Phoenix	Battlecry	2:46
28.	"Heart of Courage (Live)"	Thomas J. Bergersen	Invincible	3:08
Total length:				123:44

== Critical reception ==
The review at Faze Magazine called it "pure pleasure, thrilling, with goosebumps, emotions and full of cinematic moments" and rated it 10 out of 10.

== Charts ==
=== Weekly charts ===
Chart performance for Live – An Epic Music Experience
Chart (2022)	Peak position
Belgian Classical Albums (Ultratop Flanders)	3
Belgian Classical Albums (Ultratop Wallonia)	5
German Albums (Offizielle Top 100)	28
Swiss Albums (Schweizer Hitparade)	58
UK Album Downloads (OCC)	39
US Classical Crossover Albums (Billboard)	5

=== Year-end charts ===
Chart performance for Live – An Epic Music Experience
Chart (2022)	Position
Belgian Classical Albums (Ultratop Flanders)	49

Chart performance for Live – An Epic Music Experience
Chart (2023)	Position
Belgian Classical Albums (Ultratop Flanders)	42
Belgian Classical Albums (Ultratop Wallonia)	45
