= Heart of Courage =

Song by Two Steps from Hell

from the album Invincible
- Released: May 3, 2010
- Recorded: 2008
- Genre: Trailer music · Classical
- Length: 1:57
- Songwriter: Thomas J. Bergersen

"Heart of Courage" is a song by the American production music company, Two Steps from Hell; it was composed by co-founder Thomas Bergersen. It originates from the "drama"/second disc of their 2008 trailer music demo album, Legend, circulated exclusively within the movie advertising industry for the purpose of licensing. The track was subsequently made available for public purchase on the group's first commercial album, Invincible, released on 3 May 2010.

It is considered the group's most famous song, having gone on to be extensively used worldwide as the background track for film trailers, video game trailers, TV commercials, stadium events and festivals. Particularly notable was its use as the entrance theme of the teams onto the pitch at all 31 matches of UEFA Euro 2012 which thrust it into the public limelight, becoming known as a de facto theme of the tournament.

== Description ==
"Heart of Courage" is orchestral and choral-based, with an emphasis on strings including significant use of the violin and cello. Instrumental elements were performed by the Czech-based Capellen Orchestra, whilst the choral elements were performed by The Salt Lake Tabernacle Choir.

It begins gently and slowly in B-flat minor. The song starts to build after ~0:30 with the introduction of a repetitive rhythm, and further still at ~0:45 when a catchy melody is introduced, featuring a choir singing short lines, mostly consisting of just a word or two. The song ceases to build after roughly half of its length when it then crescendos in E-flat minor, climaxing in intensity at ~1:40. Strings then continue on until the end of the track, once again returning to B-flat minor and finishing by fading out.

The song is famed for its "epic" and emotive qualities. Soundstripe summaries the song from this perspective saying, "No matter which visual you prefer, this piece of adventure music somehow captures the excitement and danger that we'd expect to find in another place or time. And in two minutes that song creates an experience that might take 30 minutes to pull off in a visual medium." Its capacity to induce emotion has led it to be frequently cited by professional sports people as a popular pre-game motivational anthem.

== Charts ==
Weekly chart performance for "Heart of Courage"
Chart (2012–15)	Peak position
UK Independent Singles (OCC)	46
UK Independent Singles Breakers (OCC)	11
French Top 200 Singles (SNEP)	95

== Appearances ==
"Heart of Courage" has appeared on multiple Two Steps from Hell albums:

- Legend (2008) – Demo album; original appearance.
- Invincible (2010) – Initial commercial release.
- Legacy (2015) – Japan-exclusive greatest hits release.
- Two Steps from Hell: Ringtones (2016) – Mobile-exclusive; track split into three short excerpts intended for use as ringtones.
- Legend Anthology (2019) – Features as an alternative, "no choir" version of the track.
- Greatest Hits Remastered (2020) – Demo album; digital remaster.
- Live – An Epic Music Experience (2022) – Features a live recording of the track from their 2022 European Tour.

== Use in media ==
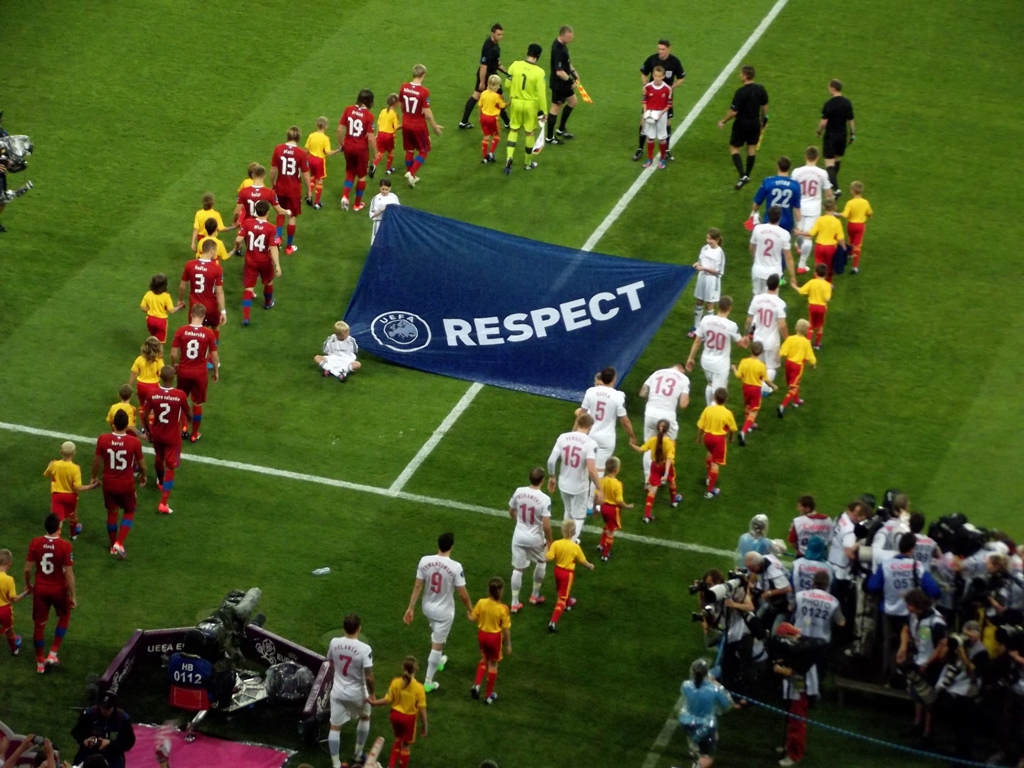
The song accompanied the introduction of players onto the pitch at all UEFA Euro 2012 matches.

The following are select examples of notable uses of "Heart of Courage" in the media, and the varying types it is frequently featured in:

- in trailers for films such as:
  - The Chronicles of Narnia: The Voyage of the Dawn Treader and Avatar.
- in trailers for television shows such as:
  - the NBC series Revolution, the BBC series Frozen Planet, and the ABC series Once Upon a Time in Wonderland.
- in trailers for video games such as:
  - Mass Effect 2, Ryse: Son of Rome, Nehrim: At Fate's Edge (a total conversion mod of The Elder Scrolls IV: Oblivion), the 2014 trailer for Angry Birds Epic and Game of War: Fire Age.
- in television shows such as:
  - featuring in multiple episodes of the BBC series Top Gear, as the opening titles theme of the Comedy Central series Nathan for You, in multiple History Channel documentaries, in an episode of The Masked Singer, in the Greek reality series Survivor Greece, Survivor Turkey, in the Italian series Ulysses – The Pleasure of Discovery and Journey into the Great Beauty, in the German YouTube reality TV series 7 vs. Wild as opening title theme and as the opening background music for the reportages of italian journalist Enrico Lucci.
- in TV commercials and promotional videos such as:
  - for the Ferrari FF in 2011, for a new Mercedes-Benz SUV in 2015, for the 2015 Rugby World Cup, for multiple reed.co.uk adverts in 2016, and for Amazon Alexa in 2020.
- during stadium events and festivals such as:
  - as the opening theme music for all matches of UEFA Euro 2012, at multiple stages of the 2012 Summer Olympics in London, as part of the music accompanying Europe's largest firework display in France, the Great Fire of Saint-Cloud, in 2012, and as the entrance music for numerous clubs in a number of German football leagues.

== Samples and remixes ==
The main segment of the melody has been re-used in a couple popular songs:

- "Darkside" by Alan Walker during the chorus at the lyric "I see it, let's feel it, while we're still young and fearless".
- "Beast in Black" by Beast in Black during the verses.

"The Unknown" by Frequencerz is a higher-key hardstyle remix of "Heart of Courage".
