= Legend (Two Steps from Hell album) =

Demo album by Two Steps From Hell
- Released: May 28, 2008
- Length: 1:26:48 (main tracks); 2:48:03 (incl. alternatives)

Legend is a demonstration album by the music production group Two Steps from Hell, originally released exclusively to clients in the motion picture and advertising industry for the purpose of licensing in May 2008. It consists of three discs: two CDs and a bonus DVD. The former contain a total of 37 principal tracks; 20 on disc one and 17 on disc two. The latter includes a large collection of alternative versions; therefore, in total, Legend consists of 77 tracks. They are predominantly composed by the group's founding members, Thomas J. Bergersen and Nick Phoenix, as well as some by Troels Folmann. The album was recorded by Capellen Orchestra in Prague, Czech Republic and at Capitol Studios in Los Angeles, United States. The cover artwork and the sleeve are designed by Steven R. Gilmore.

Some of the group's most successful tracks originate from this release, like "Heart of Courage", "Protectors of the Earth", and "Freedom Fighters"; a handful of such tracks were made available to the general public on subsequent commercial albums, starting with Invincible (2010). In 2019, the album was finally released to the public, albeit modified to consist of only the tracks which had still not yet been made commercially available and under the title of Legend Anthology.

== Track listing ==
Below is the original track listing.

The public re-issue of the album as Legend Anthology was released on 1 November 2019. Its listing is different to the original – it is of all the remaining tracks (bar five) which, until its release, were still unavailable for public purchase and arranged in alphabetical order; tracks which had already been released to the public on other commercial albums were excluded. Therefore, Legend Anthology features 59 tracks and has a total length of 2:07:03.

CD 1 – "Epic drama"

No.	Title	Writer(s)	Later released on the public album:	Length
1.	"Freedom Fighters"	Thomas J. Bergersen	Invincible	2:28
2.	"Asimov"	Nick Phoenix	Classics Volume One	2:12
3.	"Hypnotica"	Thomas J. Bergersen	Invincible	2:09
4.	"Destiny of Mankind"	Troels Folmann	Legend Anthology	2:00
5.	"Call to Arms"	Thomas J. Bergersen	Legend Anthology	0:56
6.	"Goddysey"	Nick Phoenix	—	2:25
7.	"Protectors of the Earth"	Thomas J. Bergersen	Invincible	2:50
8.	"A.S.A.P."	Troels Folmann	Legend Anthology	2:27
9.	"Down with the Enterprise"	Nick Phoenix	—	2:57
10.	"Smell of Victory"	Thomas J. Bergersen	Legend Anthology	1:53
11.	"Never Forget"	Troels Folmann	Legend Anthology	2:22
12.	"Forces of Destiny"	Nick Phoenix	Legend Anthology	2:27
13.	"Rising Force"	Nick Phoenix	Legend Anthology	1:53
14.	"Divine Intervention"	Thomas J. Bergersen	Legend Anthology	2:09
15.	"Crusaders"	Thomas J. Bergersen	Legend Anthology	1:57
16.	"Infinite Legends"	Nick Phoenix	Invincible	2:03
17.	"Fields of Blood"	Thomas J. Bergersen	Legend Anthology	2:41
18.	"White Witch"	Nick Phoenix	Classics Volume One	2:43
19.	"Fateful Night"	Thomas J. Bergersen	Classics Volume Two	2:23
20.	"Dreams of the Dead"	Nick Phoenix	Legend Anthology	1:56

CD 2 – "Drama"

No.	Title	Writer(s)	Later released on the public album:	Length
1.	"Fill My Heart"	Nick Phoenix	Invincible	2:24
2.	"Undying Love"	Thomas J. Bergersen	Invincible	2:30
3.	"Moonlight Armies"	Nick Phoenix	Legend Anthology	2:51
4.	"Heart of Courage"	Thomas J. Bergersen	Invincible	1:57
5.	"Calamity"	Thomas J. Bergersen	Halloween	1:40
6.	"Calamity (Remix)"	Thomas J. Bergersen	Legend Anthology	1:49
7.	"Day Becomes Night"	Nick Phoenix	Legend Anthology	2:20
8.	"Perchance to Dream"	Thomas J. Bergersen	Legend Anthology	1:59
9.	"Equus"	Nick Phoenix	Legend Anthology	2:37
10.	"The Crossing"	Nick Phoenix	Legend Anthology	2:07
11.	"Adventure of a Lifetime"	Thomas J. Bergersen	Classics Volume Two	1:09
12.	"Fallout"	Thomas J. Bergersen	Legend Anthology	2:30
13.	"Red Carpets"	Thomas J. Bergersen	Legend Anthology	0:59
14.	"Perilous Journey"	Thomas J. Bergersen	Legend Anthology	2:10
15.	"Voyager"	Thomas J. Bergersen	Legend Anthology	1:13
16.	"Shadows of Beauty"	Nick Phoenix	Legend Anthology	2:30
17.	"Legions of Faith"	Nick Phoenix	Legend Anthology	2:41

DVD – Alternative mixes
All tracks (except for nos. 14, 22 and 23) were later released on the public version of the album, Legend Anthology.

No.	Title	Writer(s)	Length
1.	"Adventure of a Lifetime (No Choir)"	Thomas J. Bergersen	1:09
2.	"A.S.A.P. (No Choir)"	Nick Phoenix	2:28
3.	"A.S.A.P. (Voice)"	Nick Phoenix	2:28
4.	"A.S.A.P. (Voice) (Choir)"	Nick Phoenix	2:26
5.	"Asimov (No Choir)"	Nick Phoenix	2:12
6.	"Calamity (No Choir)"	Thomas J. Bergersen	1:41
7.	"Calamity (Strings Only)"	Thomas J. Bergersen	1:41
8.	"Call to Arms (No Choir)"	Thomas J. Bergersen	0:57
9.	"Crusaders (No Choir)"	Thomas J. Bergersen	1:57
10.	"Day Becomes Night (No Choir)"	Nick Phoenix	2:19
11.	"Destiny of Mankind (No Choir)"	Troels Folmann	1:51
12.	"Divine Intervention (No Brass) (No Choir)"	Thomas J. Bergersen	2:10
13.	"Divine Intervention (No Choir)"	Thomas J. Bergersen	2:10
14.	"Down With The Enterprise (No Choir)"	Nick Phoenix	2:57
15.	"Dreams of the Dead (No Choir)"	Nick Phoenix	1:56
16.	"Equus (No Choir)"	Nick Phoenix	2:36
17.	"Equus (No Snare) (Choir)"	Nick Phoenix	2:36
18.	"Equus (No Snare) (No Choir)"	Nick Phoenix	2:37
19.	"Fields of Blood (No Choir)"	Thomas J. Bergersen	2:39
20.	"Fill My Heart (No Choir)"	Nick Phoenix	2:23
21.	"Forces of Destiny (No Choir)"	Nick Phoenix	2:29
22.	"Freedom Fighters (No Choir)"	Thomas J. Bergersen	2:29
23.	"Goddysey (No Choir)"	Nick Phoenix	2:28
24.	"Heart of Courage (No Choir)"	Thomas J. Bergersen	1:58
25.	"Hypnotica (No Choir)"	Thomas J. Bergersen	2:09
26.	"Infinite legends (No Choir)"	Nick Phoenix	2:02
27.	"Legions of Faith (No Choir)"	Nick Phoenix	2:40
28.	"Moonlight Armies (No Choir)"	Nick Phoenix	2:49
29.	"Never Forget (No Choir)"	Troels Folmann	2:25
30.	"Never Forget (Voice)"	Troels Folmann	2:19
31.	"Never Forget (Voice) (Choir)"	Troels Folmann	2:19
32.	"Perchance to Dream (No Choir)"	Thomas J. Bergersen	2:00
33.	"Protectors of the Earth (No Choir)"	Thomas J. Bergersen	2:51
34.	"Red Carpets (No Choir)"	Thomas J. Bergersen	1:00
35.	"Rising Force (No Choir)"	Nick Phoenix	1:51
36.	"Shadows of Beauty (No Choir)"	Nick Phoenix	2:30
37.	"The Crossing (No Choir)"	Nick Phoenix	2:03
38.	"Undying Love (Choir) (Extended)"	Thomas J. Bergersen	2:53
39.	"Undying Love (No Choir)"	Thomas J. Bergersen	2:30
40.	"White Witch (No Choir)"	Nick Phoenix	2:42

== Critical reception ==
IFMCA-associated reviews website, MundoBSO, rated it six out of ten stars.

The editorial team at the Remote Control Productions and Hans Zimmer-affiliated fansite, hans-zimmer.com, rated it four out of five stars.

== Charts ==
As a demo, the album was not available for public purchase and therefore unable to enter any charts.

However, the re-release of the album as Legend Anthology in 2019 was a public offering and did chart as follows:

Chart (2019)	Peak position
US Classical Albums (Billboard)	19

== Use in media ==
Two Steps From Hell's music has been featured frequently in movie trailers and promotional campaigns.

- Freedom Fighters and Down with the Enterprise were used in trailers for the 2009 Star Trek movie.
- Heart of Courage was used in the trailer for The Chronicles of Narnia: The Voyage of the Dawn Treader as well as in TV spots for the DVD of Avatar, the TV shows Camelot, Frozen Planet, The Pacific, and Revolution, the Greek reality show Survivor, and the video game Mass Effect 2. It is also the intro theme for Nathan for You and all games of UEFA Euro 2012. It was used in TV commercials for the Ferrari FF, Tod's. and reed.co.uk It was used for US World Champion gymnast Alicia Sacramone's 2011 floor routine. This song was also used in an episode of The Innovators: The Men Who Built America as well as in the series The World Wars the "Nooice" sketch by Key & Peele, and in the 2021 Major League Baseball All-Star Game during MasterCard’s Stand Up to Cancer tribute.
- ASAP was used in the trailer for series 1 of Sherlock.
- Fill My Heart was used in the international trailer for The Young Victoria, a commercial for The Help, and a TV spot for the 3D re-release of Beauty and the Beast.
- Protectors of the Earth was used in the trailer for Inkheart and a featurette titled "Gringott's and Goblins" for Harry Potter and the Deathly Hallows – Part 2, as well as an ad for the second half of the 6th series of Doctor Who and ads for Thundercats. It was also used in the 6th episode of the third season of Blue Mountain State and is the title music for Vietnam in HD. Additionally, it was also used in the official launch trailer of Mass Effect 3 and for the presentation of the new stadium of AEK Athens.
- Infinite Legends was used in the theatrical trailer for Breaking Dawn – Part 1 and for a trailer for the Merlin TV series.
- Calamity was used in the Killzone 3 Justice Trailer.
- Calamity (Remix) was used in a teaser for The Twilight Saga: Eclipse.
- Undying Love was used in the "Nooice" sketch by Key & Peele.
- Destiny of Mankind was used in the Batman: Arkham Asylum Villain trailer.
- Forces of Destiny was used in an episode of The Innovators: The Men Who Built America.
- Call To Arms was used in "Magical Negro Fight" sketch by Key & Peele and in the Vegas Golden Knights 2017–18 pregame introductions in the Stanley Cup playoffs.
