= Myth (album) =

Studio album by Two Steps from Hell
- Released: May 3, 2022
- Genre: Trailer music
- Length: 86:00
- Producer: Thomas Bergersen; Nick Phoenix

Two Steps from Hell chronology
| Dragon (2019) | Myth (2022) | Live - An Epic Music Experience (2022) |

Myth is the twelfth and final studio album created by the music production company Two Steps from Hell, released on May 3, 2022.

It comprises 21 tracks including one bonus track, all written by composers Thomas J. Bergersen and Nick Phoenix, and features vocal performances by Merethe Soltvedt, Felicia Farerre, Asja Kadrić, Sam Brashear and Úyanga Bold. It also features cellist Tina Guo.

== Track listing ==
| No. | Title | Writer(s) | Length |
|---|---|---|---|
| 1. | "Phantom" (featuring Merethe Soltvedt) | Thomas J. Bergersen | 3:28 |
| 2. | "Queen of the North" (featuring Merethe Soltvedt and Felicia Farerre) | Nick Phoenix | 3:31 |
| 3. | "Last One Standing" (featuring Tina Guo and Úyanga Bold) | Thomas J. Bergersen | 3:25 |
| 4. | "Horn of Gabriel" (featuring Asja Kadrić, Úyanga Bold and Felicia Farerre) | Nick Phoenix | 4:25 |
| 5. | "Amethyst Prince" (featuring Merethe Soltvedt) | Thomas J. Bergersen | 4:13 |
| 6. | "Twin Lights" (featuring Úyanga Bold, originally titled "Neon Nights" from Neon Nights) | Thomas J. Bergersen | 4:28 |
| 7. | "Never Lost Your Life" (featuring Merethe Soltvedt, from Mind Tracer) | Nick Phoenix | 4:17 |
| 8. | "Away With Your Fairies" | Thomas J. Bergersen | 4:22 |
| 9. | "Azdaja" (featuring Úyanga Bold and Asja Kadrić) | Nick Phoenix | 4:13 |
| 10. | "Hercules" | Thomas J. Bergersen | 2:54 |
| 11. | "Thunderstone" (featuring Merethe Soltvedt and Asja Kadrić) | Nick Phoenix | 3:45 |
| 12. | "Inventing the Portal" | Thomas J. Bergersen | 3:58 |
| 13. | "Defenders of the Grail" (featuring Merethe Soltvedt and Felicia Farerre) | Nick Phoenix | 3:09 |
| 14. | "For the Girl Who Has Everything" (from Mind Tracer) | Nick Phoenix | 3:15 |
| 15. | "PWND" (featuring Úyanga Bold) | Thomas J. Bergersen | 3:46 |
| 16. | "Flying Dutchman" | Nick Phoenix | 2:41 |
| 17. | "Shiver Me Timpanis" | Thomas J. Bergersen | 3:04 |
| 18. | "Dragonborn" | Thomas J. Bergersen | 3:42 |
| 19. | "Tale of the Forest" (featuring Merethe Soltvedt) | Nick Phoenix | 4:20 |
| 20. | "Myth" | Thomas J. Bergersen | 7:59 |
| 21. | "Arcade Master" (bonus track, originally from Neon Nights) | Thomas J. Bergersen | 6:55 |
| Total length: | | | 85:08 |

== Charts ==
Chart performance for Myth
| Chart (2022) | Peak position |
|---|---|
| Swiss Albums (Schweizer Hitparade) | 98 |
| UK Album Downloads (OCC) | 25 |
| UK Independent Album Breakers (OCC) | 17 |
| US Classical Albums (Billboard) | 17 |
| US Classical Crossover Albums (Billboard) | 1 |
