= Invincible (Two Steps from Hell album) =

Studio album by Two Steps From Hell
- Released: May 3, 2010
- Recorded: 2006–2010
- Length: 57:37
- Producer: Thomas Bergersen, Nick Phoenix, Petr Pololáník

Two Steps From Hell chronology
Invincible (2010)	Archangel (2011)

Invincible is the first public album by the group Two Steps From Hell, released in May 2010. It consists of 22 tracks written by composers Thomas J. Bergersen and Nick Phoenix. The tracks are a collection of fan favourites from prior demonstration albums previously only available to the industry, "represent[ing] the very best of Thomas and Nick’s first few years at Two Steps From Hell". Two tracks, however, are brand new compositions ("Am I Not Human?" and "To Glory").

Having gained a cult following online following their 2006 creation, fans of the group began "relentlessly begging" for their private industry music to be made available commercially. Two Steps From Hell announced the album in late 2009; Bergersen later confirmed, "we are doing this purely to please our fans". It had the working title of Genesis. Upon release, it went to number 1 on the iTunes Classical charts and remained in the top 10 for over a year.

Initially a digital release, it was eventually released physically a year later via CD Baby, after the group reached 20,000 likes on their Facebook page.

== Track listing ==
Tracks 1, 16, and 17 are reworked versions from their original releases.

No.	Title	Writer(s)	From the original demo album:	Length
1.	"Freedom Fighters"	Thomas J. Bergersen	Legend	2:31
2.	"Heart of Courage"	Thomas J. Bergersen	Legend	1:57
3.	"Master of Shadows"	Nick Phoenix	Power of Darkness	3:04
4.	"Moving Mountains"	Thomas J. Bergersen	Nemesis	3:01
5.	"Am I Not Human?"	Nick Phoenix	—	3:00
6.	"Enigmatic Soul"	Thomas J. Bergersen	Nemesis	2:52
7.	"Fire Nation"	Nick Phoenix	Power of Darkness	2:59
8.	"Black Blade"	Thomas J. Bergersen	Power of Darkness	3:05
9.	"Super Strength"	Nick Phoenix	Volume One	1:58
10.	"Invincible"	Thomas J. Bergersen	Power of Darkness	2:51
11.	"False King"	Thomas J. Bergersen, Nick Phoenix	Nemesis	2:15
12.	"Hypnotica"	Thomas J. Bergersen	Legend	2:08
13.	"Fill My Heart"	Nick Phoenix	Legend	2:23
14.	"Protectors of the Earth"	Thomas J. Bergersen	Legend	2:49
15.	"Velocitron"	Nick Phoenix	Power of Darkness	2:32
16.	"Undying Love"	Thomas J. Bergersen	Legend	2:52
17.	"1000 Ships of the Underworld"	Nick Phoenix	Dynasty	1:40
18.	"Tristan"	Thomas J. Bergersen	Nemesis	2:37
19.	"Breath of Ran Gor"	Nick Phoenix	Dynasty	2:00
20.	"Infinite Legends"	Nick Phoenix	Legend	2:02
21.	"To Glory"	Thomas J. Bergersen	—	4:35
22.	"After the Fall"	Nick Phoenix	The Devil Wears Nada	2:26

== Critical reception ==
James Monger of AllMusic reviewed the album favourably, rating it three and a half out of five stars.

The review at Trailer Music News was very positive, calling it a "musical triumph" and that it "meets the lofty expectations set forth by the community easily, often managing to surpass them... each track will tug at your heart in its own unique and powerful manner". However it did criticise its release in mp3 compression and the lack of lossless availability.

IFMCA-associated reviews website, MundoBSO, rated it seven out of ten stars.

The editorial team at the Remote Control Productions and Hans Zimmer-affiliated fansite, hans-zimmer.com, rated it four out of five stars.

== Charts ==
=== Weekly charts ===
Chart (2012)	Peak position
Belgian Classical Albums (Ultratop Flanders)	9
Belgian Classical Albums (Ultratop Wallonia)	9

=== Year-end charts ===
Chart (2012)	Position
Belgian Classical Albums (Ultratop Flanders)	47

== Use in media ==
Many tracks from Invincible are frequently used in film trailers, television shows, and advertisements.

"Freedom Fighters" was used in:

- the trailer for Evangelion: 1.0 You Are (Not) Alone
- the trailer for the 2009 Star Trek movie

"Heart of Courage" was used in:

- trailers for the movie The Chronicles of Narnia: The Voyage of the Dawn Treader
- television spots for the DVD of the movie Avatar
- trailers for the ABC television show Once Upon a Time in Wonderland
- the movie Long Long Time Ago
- the television show World War II in HD: The Air War
- the television show Camelot
- the television show Frozen Planet
- the television show The Pacific
- the television show Revolution
- the mecha anime television series Buddy Complex, as the "Coupling Mode" theme
- the reality shows Survivor Greece and Survivor Turkey
- the official launch trailer of the video game Mass Effect 2
- Season 1 of the television show Lucha Underground, as Mascarita Sagrada's entrance music
- the History Channel docudrama The Innovators: The Men Who Built America
- the History Channel documentary The Universe Season 6, in episode "Crash Landing on Mars"
- the History Channel documentary Titanic at 100: Mystery Solved
- the History Channel documentary History of the World in Two Hours
- the History Channel docudrama The World Wars
- Season 17 Episode 3, Season 18, and Season 22 of the BBC television show Top Gear
- the opening theme for all games of UEFA Euro 2012
- a Tod's television commercial
- the release trailer of Nehrim: At Fate's Edge, a total conversion mod for the video game The Elder Scrolls IV: Oblivion
- the floor music of gymnast Alicia Sacramone, along with Jorge Quintero's "300 Violin Orchestra", in 2011
- A video showing 26 years of World Youth Days produced by Grassroots Media
- a promotional video of the Ferrari FF
- the main title theme of the Comedy Central television show Nathan For You
- the ending credits of America's Got Talent (season 9) episode "Boot Camp", in 2014
- a commercial for the mobile strategy game Game of War: Fire Age, in 2015
- a commercial for the 1998 Disney film Mulan, in 2018
- background music for various news telecasts by News Live
- an Italian documentary called Ulisse - Il piacere della scoperta
- an episode of The Grand Tour presents... A Massive Hunt - episode 2
- the intro of the German YouTube survival show 7 vs. Wild

"Master of Shadows" was used in:

- the trailer for the movie 2012
- the trailer for the movie Abraham Lincoln: Vampire Hunter
- commercials for the movie Harry Potter and the Deathly Hallows – Part 2
- the History Channel docudrama The Innovators: The Men Who Built America
- the television show Australia's Got Talent
- the National Geographic Channel documentary Mission Pluto
- EverQuest II trailer for Freeblood player race

"Moving Mountains" was used in:

- the trailer for the movie 2012
- the trailer for the movie A Good Day to Die Hard
- the trailer for the movie Jumper
- the trailer for the Twilight Saga movie New Moon
- the International trailer for the movie X-Men: First Class
- television spots for the movie The Debt
- television spots for Harry Potter: Years 1-6 on Blu-ray
- the HBO television series Game of Thrones
- the BBC documentary Planet Dinosaur
- a commercial for the video game Soul Calibur V
- the Discovery Channel documentary Into the Universe with Stephen Hawking

"Am I Not Human?" was used in:

- promotional material for Tron: Legacy (Coca-Cola related campaign)
- the trailer for the Mass Effect 3 Rebellion Multiplayer Downloadable Content
- a Discovery Channel advertisement
- the History Channel documentary Mankind: The Story of All of Us
- the History Channel documentary The Universe Season 6, in the episodes "Crash Landing on Mars" and "God and the Universe"

"Fire Nation" was used in:

- some History Channel documentaries, such as Titanic at 100: Mystery Solved and Your Bleeped Up Brain.

"Black Blade" was used in:

- the trailer for the movie Priest
- television spots for the movie Star Trek
- television spots for the movie X-Men Origins: Wolverine
- television spots for the movie X-Men: First Class
- television spots for the movie Harry Potter and the Deathly Hallows – Part 2
- television spots for the movie Abraham Lincoln: Vampire Hunter
- television spots for the movie The Book of Eli
- the trailer for the video game Mass Effect 3
- the trailer for the video game Prince of Persia: The Sands of Time
- the trailer "Future Visions" for the video game Kingdom of Amalur: Reckoning
- commercials for the video game Homefront
- commercials for the video game Star Wars: The Old Republic
- commercials for the video game Binary Domain
- trailers for the television show The Legend of Korra
- trailers for the television show Atlantis
- trailers for the television show Terra Nova
- the History Channel documentary The Universe Season 6, in episode "Crash Landing on Mars"
- the History Channel docudrama The World Wars

"Super Strength" was used in:

- the trailer for WALL-E
- the History Channel docudrama The Innovators: The Men Who Built America
- a trailer for the video game Star Wars: The Old Republic

"Invincible" was used in:

- a commercial for the HBO television show Game of Thrones
- the long preview for the Adventure Time episode "Up a Tree"
- a performance by the Massed Bands of the Royal Marines at the 2013 Mountbatten Festival of Music in London
- the History Channel documentary, The Universe Season 6, in episode "Crash Landing on Mars"
- the PlayStation 4 launch video on YouTube

"Fill My Heart" was used in:

- the international trailer for The Young Victoria
- a commercial for The Help
- a television spot for the 3D re-release of Beauty and the Beast
- the official trailer for Heaven Is for Real

"Protectors of the Earth" was used in:

- intro movie in Might and Magic Heroes VII
- the trailer for the movie Inkheart
- a featurette titled "Gringotts and Goblins" for Harry Potter and the Deathly Hallows – Part 2
- an advert for the second half of the series 6 of Doctor Who
- adverts for the television show Thundercats
- the sixth episode of Season 3 of Blue Mountain State
- the official trailer for the movie Gladiator
- the opening titles for the History Channel documentary Vietnam in HD
- the Jedi Consular class trailer in Star Wars: The Old Republic
- the official launch trailer of the video game Mass Effect 3
- a commercial for the television show MasterChef Asia, alongside "Rise of the Abyss" from the Solaris album
- the presentation of the new Agia Sophia Stadium of AEK Athens

"Velocitron" was used in:

- commercials for the movie Harry Potter and the Deathly Hallows – Part 2
- commerciales for the video game Assassin's Creed Brotherhood

"1000 Ships of the Underworld" was used in:

- trailers for the movie Priest
- trailers for the movie The Incredible Hulk
- trailers for the movie Aliens vs. Predator: Requiem
- trailers for the movie Miracle at St. Anna
- trailers for the Twilight Saga movie Eclipse
- promotional material for the movie Harry Potter and the Deathly Hallows – Part 2
- teaser trailer for the online video game EverQuest II expansion Destiny of Velious

"Tristan" was used in:

- trailers for the movie Cloudy with a Chance of Meatballs
- trailers for the movie Australia
- a trailer for Series 6 of Doctor Who
- the History Channel documentary, The Universe Season 6, in the episode "Crash Landing on Mars"

"Infinite Legends" was used in:

- theatrical trailer for the Twilight Saga movie Breaking Dawn: Part 1
- trailer for the television series Merlin
- the first episode of the South Korean TV show The Genius

"Undying Love" was used in:

- a promotional trailer for Halo Fest and in the History Channel documentary, The Universe Season 6, in episode "Crash Landing on Mars".

"After the Fall" was used in:

- the "Take Earth Back" trailer for the video game Mass Effect 3
- a commercial for the television series Pretty Little Liars
- the History Channel documentary Titanic at 100: Mystery Solved

"Enigmatic Soul" was used in:

- a National Geographic Channel commercial.

"To Glory" was used in:

- Top Gear USA, season 9, episode 5, "Military Might"
- Top Gear USA, season 5, episode 4, "Snow Show"
- an advert for the Adventure Time online video game
- a commercial for the Marvel television series Avengers Assemble
- the television show Death Battle, in episode "Chuck Norris vs Segata Sanshiro"
- Dubai 2015 New Years fireworks display
- during Game 7 of the 2016 NBA Finals between the Cleveland Cavaliers and the Golden State Warriors
