= The Spiderwick Chronicles (soundtrack) =

The Spiderwick Chronicles (Original Motion Picture Score)

Film score by James Horner
- Released: February 12, 2008
- Studios: Todd-AO Scoring Stage, Studio City, Los Angeles
- Genre: Film score
- Length: 1:11:38
- Label: Lakeshore Records
- Producer: James Horner

James Horner chronology
The Life Before Her Eyes (2007)	The Spiderwick Chronicles (2008)	The Boy in the Striped Pyjamas (2008)

The Spiderwick Chronicles (Original Motion Picture Score) is the score album to the 2008 film composed and conducted by James Horner. The album features 15 tracks from Horner's score and was released on February 12, 2008, by Lakeshore Records. The fils featured an original song, a rendition of the nursery rhyme "London Bridge Is Falling Down" performed by Jordy Benattar, that was not included in the soundtrack. The score received positive reviews.

== Production ==
The score was recorded at the Todd-AO Scoring Stage, Studio City, Los Angeles. Horner conducted the Hollywood Symphony Orchestra and the orchestration is done by Carl Johnson, Eddie Karam, Gary K. Thomas, Steven R. Bernstein. David Edelstein of New York magazine had opined "James Horner–channeling–John Williams score with a few chromatic chords to keep the orchestra from laughing the composer off the podium."

The Japanese version uses "Checkmate" by Yuugin as its theme song.

== Reception ==
Jonathan Broxton wrote "you can't tell many fantasy scores apart... as nice as things like Stardust (2007) and Bridge to Terabithia (2007) are, they simply don't feel very distinct. Horner continues to have a unique, uncompromised voice, and the quality of his writing is far and away better than that of the average composer. It's unlikely that this album will be considered one the year's best, but it is a rewarding experience that will reveal numerous layers upon repeat listens, and is easily recommended to Horner fans out there." Music critic Thomas Simpson gave 3.5 (out of 5) saying "You know Horner wrote it by the use of orchestral bells at their finest. He just seems to have a knack for writing uplifting yet at the same time dark pieces for the bells. And though the flight of the griffin is triumphant is ends on a rather sad note, no pun intended, but given the pace of the movie and the books its the perfect music for the scene. For the movie this is a great score, it fits right in with the movie."

Reviewing for Empire, called Horner's "spot-on score" and production design "will put even adults right where it wants you - part E. T., part Labyrinth, with a dash of The Goonies". Filmtracks.com wrote "there are aspects of this score that will bother detractors of Horner's work, starting with the obvious similarities between one of the two primary themes and Casper's lullaby. But the remainder of score, while not really thematically cohesive, is entertaining in most of its parts. The final two cues, aside from the disappointingly lengthy conclusion to the credits, make a beautiful and noteworthy suite." Philip French of The Guardian, David Wiegand of San Francisco Chronicle's SFGATE and CNN's Tom Charity called the score as "thunderous", "sparkling" and "warm".

James Southall of Movie Wave wrote "The Spiderwick Chronicles feels a little unfocused, very atypical of this composer, but once it hits its stride away half way through the lengthy album it never looks back. "The Flight of the Griffin" and the last two cues are just over twenty minutes between them and those are of the highest quality; enough of the rest is either good or very good to make it an easy recommendation for Horner fans." Soundtrack Beat wrote "James Horner has been resourceful and highly competent at using the orchestra in order to highlight the particularities of each movie. This made him one of the best composers of his generation. The soundtrack he wrote for the movie "The Spiderwick Chronicles" may not be among the best ones that he wrote for the genre of fantasy or in general, but it undoubtedly stands well among his most interesting works and is a sample of mature musical composition, which is lacking nowadays. Whether it is about mystery and suspense or loneliness and drama, James Horner is there to give the ideal musical solution to the riddles posed by the movie. At a time when the distinctive identity in film music is something questionable and never given, soundtracks like this remind us how self-evident this was in the musical scores of James Horner." Katherine Fullton of Allmusic wrote "Despite its resemblance to some of Williams' more whimsical works, the score ends up feeling restrained and unable to keep up with the adventurous plot it's meant to accompany. The Spiderwick Chronicles sounds fine, but there isn't much heart in it."

Following James Horner's death on June 22, 2015, RogerEbert.com's article on Horner's under-rated scores included The Spiderwick Chronicles in the list. Den of Geek included it as one of the "under-rated film scores of the 2000s".

== Track listing ==
No.	Title	Length
1.	"Writing The Chronicles"	3:03
2.	"So Many New Worlds Revealed"	5:12
3.	"Thimbletack And The Goblins"	5:16
4.	"Hogsqueal's Warning Of A Bargain With Mulgarath"	5:16
5.	"Discovering Spiderwick's Secret Workshop"	3:25
6.	"Dark Armies From The Forest Attack"	3:06
7.	"Burning The Book"	2:44
8.	"A Desperate Run Through The Tunnels"	4:47
9.	"Lucinda's Story"	6:02
10.	"The Flight Of The Griffin"	6:56
11.	"Escape From The Glade"	4:45
12.	"The Protective Circle Is Broken....!"	2:08
13.	"Jared And Mulgarath Fight For The Chronicles"	4:17
14.	"Coming Home"	6:18
15.	"Closing Credits"	8:23
Total length:		71:38

== Accolades ==
Award	Category	Recipient	Result
ASCAP Awards	Top Box Office Films	James Horner	Won
International Film Music Critics Association	Best Original Score for a Fantasy/Science Fiction/Horror Film	James Horner	Nominated

== Personnel ==
Credits adapted from CD liner notes

- A&R – Eric Craig
- Art direction – Stephanie Mente
- Music composed and conducted by – James Horner
- Score contractor – Peter Rotter, Sandy De Crescent
- Copyist – Bob Bornstein
- Music editor – Dick Bernstein, Jim Henrikson, Dave Lawrence
- Executive producer – Brian McNelis, Randy Spendlove, Skip Williamson
- Layout – Joe Chavez
- Orchestrator – Carl Johnson, Eddie Karam, Gary K. Thomas, Steven R. Bernstein
- Score producer – James Horner, Simon Rhodes
- Programming – Aaron Martin, Ian Underwood
- Recording and mixing – Simon Rhodes, Tom Hardisty
- Music supervision – Sylvia Wells, J.A.C. Redford
