= John Beal (composer) =

American composer and conductor

John Everett Beal
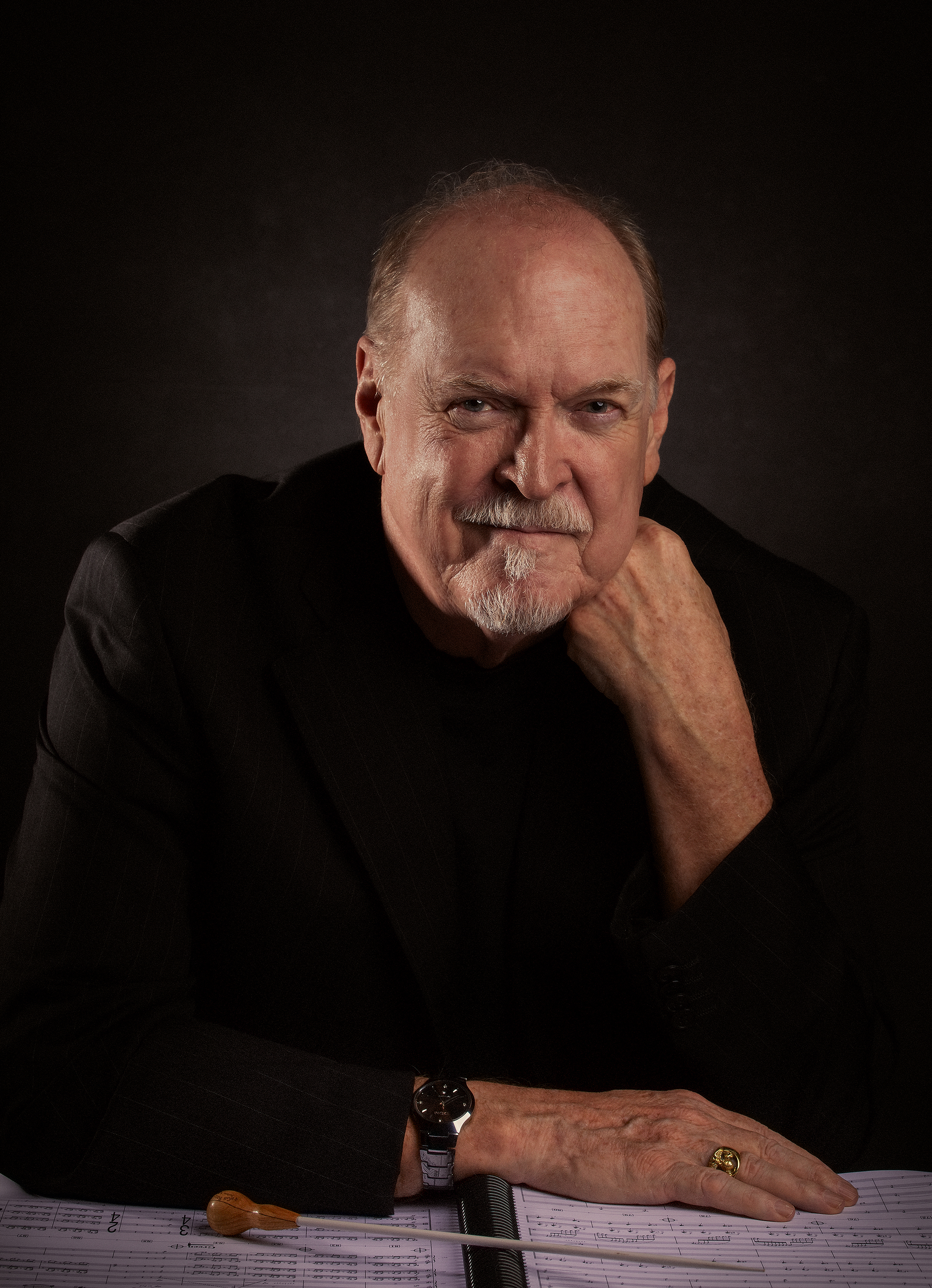
- Formal portrait, 2017
- Born: John Everett Beal; January 20, 1947 (age 79); Santa Monica, California, United States
- Occupations: Music conductor Music composer Jazz Musician; Classical musician Military veteran
- Military career
- Allegiance: United States of America
- Branch: United States Marine Corps
- Service years: 1966–1972
- Conflicts: Vietnam War
- Website: www.composerjohnbeal.com

John Everett Beal (born January 20, 1947) is an American composer and conductor known for his work in the American film industry. He has conducted for major recording artists ranging from Olivia Newton-John to Deadmau5, movies in concert such as Star Wars, Top Gun: Maverick, Toy Story, Home Alone, Rocketman and the Harry Potter series, is the principal conductor of the Hollywood Symphony Orchestra, is considered by the New York Times as the pioneer of original scores for film trailer music, and has composed the music for numerous television series and films.

== Early life ==
John Beal was born in Santa Monica, California, raised in La Cañada Flintridge, California, and graduated from John Muir High School (Pasadena, California), where he was honored for having written many of the drum cadences for the school's internationally renowned Drum Corps, many of which are still used more than 50 years after his graduation. He was named to their Hall of Fame in 2008. He attended San Diego State University and, after being decorated for heroism and bravery in combat with the United States Marine Corps, he attended UCLA. He studied percussion with William Kraft and Bernie Mattinson, and drums with Irv Cotler (drummer for Frank Sinatra), percussion with Ethnomusicologist Craig Woodson, composition with Harry Partch scholar Danlee Mitchell, synthesizers with Clark Spangler, and film scoring with Dominic Frontiere, George Duning, Buddy Baker, Fred Werner, Eddy Lawrence Manson and Earle Hagen. In his early film career, and like many of the young composers of the day, he ghost wrote the scores for numerous major motion pictures and hit television shows and orchestrated and supervised the recording sessions for many others.

== Career ==
Beal's first instrument was piano at age 6. He was a professional soloist in a boys choir at age 8 and a professional jazz and big band drummer on stage and in the recording studio by age 15. After his highly decorated service with the United States Marine Corps, he returned to Hollywood as a musical director and arranger with recording stars Olivia Newton-John (in her U.S. debut), B. B. King, Gladys Knight, Johnny Mathis, Lou Rawls, and for many television variety shows ranging from Ed Sullivan to The Carpenters Make Your Own Kind of Music, The Captain & Tennille Songbook and John Wayne's Emmy Award-winning Sing Out Sweet Land, to The Tonight Show Starring Johnny Carson. Beal was also the conductor and arranger for the vocal groups The Establishment, The Kids Next Door, The Nabors Kids, The King Cousins, and The Doodletown Pipers, and worked on stage in Las Vegas and on the showroom circuit with such icons of the day as Phyllis Diller, Perry Como, Bobby Darin, Raquel Welch, Mitzi Gaynor, Leslie Uggams, Jim Nabors, Sally Struthers, Teresa Graves, Peggy Fleming, Frankie Avalon, and Ed Ames.

Beginning in the late 1970s, he composed original music for numerous hit television series, including Vegas with Robert Urich, Eight Is Enough with Dick Van Patten and Betty Buckley, Happy Days with Ron Howard and Henry Winkler, Laverne & Shirley with Penny Marshall and Cindy Williams, Goodtime Girls with Annie Potts and Georgia Engel, Legmen with Bruce Greenwood and John Terlesky, and Chicago Story with Dennis Franz and Craig T. Nelson. His feature films included Zero to Sixty (1978) starring Darren McGavin and Joan Collins, The Funhouse (1981) from director Tobe Hooper, Terror in the Aisles (1984) starring Donald Pleasence and Nancy Allen, and Killer Party (1986) starring Sherry Willis-Burch.

At the suggestion of Gary LeMel (President, Worldwide Music for Warner Bros.), Beal was tapped by Hollywood's marketing guru and "Godfather of Trailers," Andrew J. Kuehn of Kaleidoscope Films (Jaws and other major hit films) to work with him in the film trailer industry. Kuehn and Beal collaborated on the very inception of today's modern film trailer format and Beal has long been recognized as the man who gave contemporary trailers their musical voice. Beal has composed original scores for over 2,000 trailers. His list of major studio credits includes campaigns for such hit films as JFK, Titanic, The Matrix, Forrest Gump, The Last Samurai, Aladdin, the Star Wars trilogy, The Hunt for Red October, True Lies, In the Line of Fire, Patriot Games, The Mask of Zorro, Black Rain, Ghost, Finding Neverland, and hundreds more. Daily Variety box office results show the financial success of film campaigns to which he contributed original music is literally measured in hundreds of billions of dollars, and he is considered by the New York Times as the pioneer of original scores for film trailer music.

Conducting professionally since he was 23 years old, Maestro Beal is a highly sought-after conductor and has conducted a wide and diverse variety of shows and live-to-film scores with many of the world's greatest musicians in venues stretching from London to Tokyo, from the Orchestre Philharmonique du Luxembourg, the National Orchestra of Belgium and The City of Prague Philharmonic, to the National Symphony of Malaysia Kuala Lumpur and the Evergreen Symphony of Taiwan, as well as major symphony orchestras throughout the United States, including several decades in Los Angeles with the Hollywood Studio Symphony Orchestra. Recently, John Beal has been conducting live to film concerts that include such films as Star Wars Return of the Jedi, Top Gun: Maverick, Toy Story, The Godfather, Indiana Jones and the Raiders of the Lost Ark, The Goonies, Home Alone, Harry Potter and the Sorcerer's Stone [aka Harry Potter and the Philosopher's Stone], Harry Potter and the Chamber of Secrets, Harry Potter and the Prisoner of Azkaban, Harry Potter and the Goblet of Fire, Harry Potter and the Half-Blood Prince, Harry Potter and the Deathly Hallows, Music Directed the world premiere of Respect Film in Concert, Music Directed and conducted the world premiere of Chicago Live to Film and Music Directed and conducted the world premiere of Rocketman: Live in Concert. and Music Directed and conducted the world premiere of Serengeti: Live in Concert

In December 2017 John Beal began working with AIVA and NVIDIA. and in February 2018, John Beal became the conductor on the Deadmau5 studio album "where's the drop?" and its subsequent concerts beginning in March 2018 with deadmau5 and a large symphony orchestra.

== Other projects ==
Working with one of his mentors, Buddy Baker, and the Walt Disney Imagineering Team led by Marc Davis, John Beal composed and arranged music for the Carousel of Progress, Country Bear Jamboree, and America Sings rides at Disneyland and Walt Disney World (Orlando). He was also the music director for live stage acts during the opening of Walt Disney World in Florida and the musical conductor for the park's grand opening ceremony television presentation on NBC. According to his official bio, Beal composed original music for Gentle Jungle and Enchanted Village theme parks. Beal also composed and produced the music for commercials from Apple, NASDAQ, Ben & Jerry's, AMGEN, Dr. Pepper and many other major advertisers.

John Beal served as the General Manager and Producer of the Hollywood Symphony Orchestra for its debut concerts in the Los Angeles area, and as its television producer. Beal is President of Reeltime Creative, a company that consults for and produces motion picture creative advertising ranging from film trailers to posters to web sites.

== Selected film trailers ==
Some of the well-known film trailers (for which John Beal wrote Trailer music between 1977 and 2007) cover a wide range of styles for films including Titanic, We Were Soldiers, The Last Samurai, Finding Neverland, Star Wars, Aladdin, The Matrix, Mean Girls, Planet of the Apes, Batman Beyond, Alaska, Being John Malkovich, Black Beauty, Black Hawk Down, Black Rain, The Bodyguard, Braveheart, Casualties of War, Chaplin, Clear and Present Danger, Conspiracy Theory, Cruising, Dead Again, Donnie Brasco, Fallen, Ferris Bueller's Day Off, First Blood, Flight of the Intruder, Ghost, Hamlet, Heathers, The Hunt for Red October, JFK, The Mask, The Mask of Zorro, Medicine Man, Miracle on 34th Street, Mr. Mom, The Nightmare Before Christmas, Nothing in Common, Patriot Games, Quiz Show, Regarding Henry, Rising Sun, The Santa Clause, The Scarlet Letter, Steel Magnolias, The Toy, True Lies, Volcano, When a Man Loves a Woman, Working Girl, Payback, Tea with Mussolini, Police Academy, Indecent Proposal, Encino Man, Anaconda, Bram Stoker's Dracula, Nine to Five, Revenge, Bicentennial Man and Eraser.

== Organizations ==
According to his official biography, Beal is a former Governor of the Composers & Lyricists Guild of America (CLGA), former National Trustee and Governor of the Los Angeles Chapter of National Academy of Recording Arts and Sciences (Grammy Awards), an active member the Academy of Television Arts & Sciences (Emmy Awards), The Recording Academy Songwriters & Composers Wing and Producers & Engineers Wing, is a Platinum member of the Society of Composers & Lyricists, ASCAP, Veterans Media and Entertainment and the American Society of Music Arrangers and Composers.

== Military service ==
Beal served in the United States Marine Corps and was trained as a specialist in Nuclear, Biological and Chemical Warfare (Weapons of Mass Destruction). Sergeant Beal fought in Vietnam as a door gunner on a Huey gunship, earning his Marine Corps Combat Air Crew Wings and fighting in more than 200 combat missions and 24 major counter-insurgency operations against the North Vietnamese Army in Khe Sanh, Con Thien, Lao Bảo, Dong Ha and the A Shau Valley. He received the Combat Action Ribbon along with 8 Air Medals for bravery and was awarded a Single Mission Air Medal with Bronze Star for heroism during the rescue of a severely wounded Marine reconnaissance team near Hamburger Hill in the A Shau Valley on April 11, 1969. According to the citation for the award, after a serious firefight with an overwhelming force near Lao Bảo earlier in the day, Beal's crew refueled and came upon the trapped recon team. Surrounded by enemy fire, the Marines were struggling to drag their wounded up the extremely steep and muddy mountain to an accessible area, but were taking fire from all sides and nearly out of strength. While engaging the enemy, a rocket warhead crashed through the windscreen, hitting the pilot and crew chief. Without hesitation, the team trapped the as yet unexploded ordnance in the cabin and kept firing. The citation continues that due to his "unwavering tenacity in the face of withering enemy fire," all five Marines were saved. Additionally, Beal was awarded a Navy Achievement Medal with Combat V for Valor for his service to Vietnamese refugees near the DMZ who had fled mass genocide by the North Vietnamese Army in the North in recognition of his dedication in helping to build schools, provide medical care and protect the civilians, and the Vietnam Gallantry Cross and Vietnam Civil Actions Medal from the government of the Republic of Vietnam. Other medals include the Navy and Marine Corps Presidential Unit Citation, Navy Unit Commendation, Meritorious Unit Commendation, Overseas Service Ribbon, Vietnam Service Medal and RVN Vietnam Service Medal.

== Military awards and decorations ==
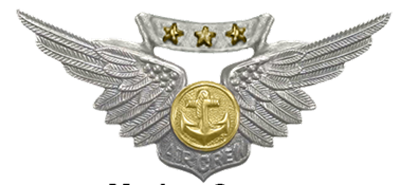

== Discography ==
- Oivia Newton John, My Heart is Alive
- Evergreen: Music of Barbra Streisand
- One and Only, Gladys Knight
- Bob Crewe, Street Talk
- Captain & Tennille, Keeping Our Love Warm
- Linda Lewis, Can't We Just Sit Down?
- David Soul, Playing to an Audience of One
- Ernie Collins, King Tut's Back
- Death of a Nation, Soundtrack
- Killer Party, Soundtrack
- Pakalameredith Band
- Deadly Blessing, Soundtrack
- Disturbing Behavior: Original Score
- The Funhouse, Soundtrack
- Terror in the Aisles, Soundtrack
- The Man with Bogart's Face, Soundtrack
- Zero to Sixty, Soundtrack
- X-Files Celebration
- Cinema Eclectic
- The SnowFiles
- The Best of Stephen King, Vol. 1
- Apocalypse Nam, the 10,000 Day War
- Zork: Grand Inquisitor
- Watch the Skies
- Heart Of The Ocean: The Film Music of James Horner
- Coming Soon, Volumes 1 & 2
- Halloween Horror Hits Volume One
- Halloween Horror Hits Volume Two
- Super Scary Monster Party
- Greatest Science Fiction Hits
- The Jerry Goldsmith Collection - Volume One: Rarities
- Film Noir's Finest: Themes from the Dark Side of the Lens
- The Ring: Horror's Finest, Volume 1
- Music from the X-Files 20th Anniversary Celebration

== Articles and books ==
- Humanizing Music with Composer John Beal CS Music
- BWW Interview: Composer and Film Conductor John Beal Talks Rocketman: Live in Concert BroadwayWorld
- The Emerging Film Composer book by Richard Bellis, 2006 pp. 136–137
- Welcome to Heart Attack City' by John Beal, "The Score", Volume XII Number 4, Winter 1998 p. 1, (continues on p. 4) Online
- John Beal, Musical Chameleon November 11, 1998, interview by Helene San, Cinemusic.net
- The Modern Hollywood Composer: Interview with Composer John Beal, by Simon Barber, Liverpool Institute for the Performing Arts Interview
- The Art of Scoring Trailers: John Beal by Lukas Kendall, Part 1 - Film Score Monthly Magazine, issue #35, July 2003, pp 6–7, Part 2 continues in issue #36/Aug 37/September 1993, pp18–19 Online version
- Art of the Tease by Rick Sherwood, Hollywood Reporter August 25, 1992 pp. S-39-S-72
- Coming Attractions!: The two-minute film scores of John Beal by Randall D. Larson, "The Score" Cinefantastique, June 1999, Volume 31, Number 6 p. 60
- Aisle of the Dead: Revisiting Terror Tonalities with John Beal By Randall D. Larson
- The Oxford Student, Trailer Music'
- Disneyland 60th Anniversary: Composers share favorite Disney music memories by Mark Morton, Examiner
- Trailer Music Vibe: Featured Film Composer John Beal
- Movie Trailer Music: It's Not What You Think The Guardian 2011
- Trailer Music: A Look at the Overlooked
- Razor-thin Copyright Line: Approximating temp music for trailers is risky business, Variety, June 2, 2010 Razor-thin copyright line

== See also ==
- Trailer music
