= Dragon (Two Steps from Hell album) =

Studio album by Two Steps from Hell
- Released: January 18, 2019
- Length: 81:38
- Producer: Thomas Bergersen, Nick Phoenix

Two Steps from Hell chronology
Unleashed (2017)	Dragon (2019)	Myth (2022)

Dragon is the eleventh studio album created by the music production company Two Steps from Hell, released on 18 January 2019. It consists of 19 tracks written by composers Thomas J. Bergersen and Nick Phoenix, and features vocal performances by Merethe Soltvedt, Felicia Farerre and Úyanga Bold. Chris Bleth and Claudio Pietronik are also credited for specific instrumental performances. The cover artwork and the sleeve are designed by Steven R. Gilmore.

The group live-streamed the album, intercut with cameos from personnel involved, on Facebook a day before its release. It was watched by 14,000 viewers.

The album peaked at number 2 on the US Classical Albums chart.

== Track listing ==
Dragon track listing
No.	Title	Writer(s)	Length
1.	"Unbreakable" (featuring Merethe Soltvedt)	Thomas J. Bergersen	4:16
2.	"First Contact" (featuring Merethe Soltvedt)	Nick Phoenix	4:08
3.	"Bravestone"	Thomas J. Bergersen	3:17
4.	"Dragon" (featuring Úyanga Bold)	Nick Phoenix	3:44
5.	"Emerald Princess" (featuring Merethe Soltvedt & Chris Bleth)	Thomas J. Bergersen	11:01
6.	"At the Wall"	Nick Phoenix	4:01
7.	"Race to Durango"	Thomas J. Bergersen	4:05
8.	"Untold" (featuring Felicia Farerre & Merethe Soltvedt)	Nick Phoenix	4:48
9.	"Dragonwing" (featuring Claudio Pietronik)	Thomas J. Bergersen	2:57
10.	"Riders of the Apocalypse" (featuring Úyanga Bold, Felicia Farerre & Merethe Soltvedt)	Nick Phoenix	2:52
11.	"Skulls & Trombones"	Thomas J. Bergersen	4:04
12.	"Lonely Are the Brave" (featuring Felicia Farerre and Merethe Soltvedt)	Nick Phoenix	3:58
13.	"Letters to God"	Thomas J. Bergersen	3:16
14.	"Gift of the Gods" (featuring Úyanga Bold)	Nick Phoenix	4:08
15.	"Nighthawk" (featuring Merethe Soltvedt)	Nick Phoenix	3:24
16.	"Snowball Fight"	Thomas J. Bergersen	5:00
17.	"Cathedral" (featuring Felicia Farerre & Merethe Soltvedt)	Nick Phoenix	3:57
18.	"Believe"	Thomas J. Bergersen	4:52
19.	"Take Me with You" (featuring Felicia Farerre & Merethe Soltvedt)	Nick Phoenix	3:50
Total length:			81:38

== Critical reception ==
IFMCA-associated reviews website, MundoBSO, rated it six out of ten stars.

== Charts ==
=== Weekly charts ===
Weekly chart performance for Dragon
Chart (2019)	Peak position
Belgian Classical Albums (Ultratop Flanders)	3
Belgian Classical Albums (Ultratop Wallonia)	13
Swiss Albums (Schweizer Hitparade)	66
UK Album Downloads (OCC)	36
UK Soundtrack Albums (OCC)	13
UK Independent Albums (OCC)	34
UK Independent Album Breakers (OCC)	9
US Classical Albums (Billboard)	2
US Classical Crossover Albums (Billboard)	2
US Heatseekers Albums (Billboard)	12
US Independent Albums (Billboard)	29

=== Year-end charts ===
Year-end chart performance for Dragon
Chart (2019)	Position
US Classical Albums (Billboard)	20
US Classical Crossover Albums (Billboard)	15
