= Hollywood Symphony Orchestra =

American symphony orchestra based in Los Angeles, California

- Orchestra
- Short name: HSO
- Founded: 2006, by John Scott
- Location: Los Angeles, California, U.S.
- Principal conductor: John Beal

The Hollywood Symphony Orchestra (HSO) is a large-scale American symphony orchestra based in Los Angeles, California. It was founded by John Scott and its current principal conductor and consulting producer is John Beal. The HSO is dedicated to performing classic, contemporary, and world-premiere media scores and comprises recording musicians from the Hollywood movie studios and the Los Angeles concert scene.

Many of the musicians appear in the original recording liner notes of the movie scores presented on stage. Concerts often include a large massed choir from the Los Angeles area, bringing the population on stage to as many as 140 instrumentalists and singers.

== Background ==
Prior to 2006, this orchestra was primarily a recording orchestra, credited as far back in liner notes as The Robe (1953) composed by Alfred Newman conducting the Hollywood Symphony Orchestra (Varèse Sarabande VSD 5295) and 78 rpm recordings such as "Invitation to the Ballet", "How Green Was My Valley", and "Street Scene (A Sentimental Rhapsody)". The inaugural stage concerts of the HSO under the baton of John Scott were on May 18 and October 7, 2006, at UCLA's Royce Hall and were produced by John Beal and Peter Henton. Their first year, in addition to full programs of classic film scores from the 1930s through 2000s, the orchestra performed world premieres of music from Memoirs of a Geisha, Antony and Cleopatra, Flags of Our Fathers, World Trade Center, and The Matrix.

Composers represented in the debut concerts included Miklós Rózsa, Erich Wolfgang Korngold, John Williams, Jerry Goldsmith, Maurice Jarre, Victor Young, Dimitri Tiomkin, Craig Armstrong, Clint Eastwood, Henry Mancini, Elmer Bernstein, Dave Grusin, Alex North, John Scott, Sergei Prokofiev, Ralph Vaughan Williams, Max Steiner, Don Davis, Ernest Gold, and Bernard Herrmann.

The first concert radio broadcast was on August 20, 2006. Southern California's classical radio station K-Mozart 105.1FM broadcast a one-hour program containing portions of the inaugural concert by the Hollywood Symphony Orchestra, under the baton of John Scott.

== Programming ==
The HSO is dedicated entirely to performing visual media scores and, where possible, live-to-film performances of scores in sync with the movie exactly as performed in the original motion picture. In addition to celebrating and preserving the work of Hollywood's master composers of the past, the HSO promotes the work of emerging Hollywood composers.

== Honorary advisors ==
The Honorary Advisors to the HSO are practically a "who's who" of the film, television and music industries, with Academy Award, Golden Globe Award, Emmy Award and Grammy Award winners and nominees, including Alan Bergman, Marilyn Bergman, Marilee Bradford, Bruce Broughton, John Cacavas, Daniel Carlin, Budd Carr, Alf Clausen, Don Davis, John Debney, Allyn Ferguson, Dan Foliart, Charles Fox, Sid Ganis, Billy Goldenberg, Dave Grusin, Ted Kotcheff, Gary Le Mel, Michel Legrand, John Morgan, Randy Newman, Lennie Niehaus, Basil Poledouris (d), Sydney Pollack, Nick Redman, Edye & Pete Rugolo, Lalo Schifrin, Richard Sherman, William Stromberg, Patrick Williams, Christopher Young, Frank Yablans, and Hans Zimmer.

== Organization ==
- John Beal – principal conductor and consulting producer
- Frank DeMartini – legal representation

== Recordings ==
- "The Robe" (1953) composed by Alfred Newman conducting the Hollywood Symphony Orchestra (Varèse Sarabande VSD 5295)
- "Stravinsky: Octet, Septet/Scott: Wind in the Willows" Hollywood Symphony Orchestra, conducted by John Scott (Hollywood Symphony R 1093139)
- "A Study in Terror" (1965) composed by John Scott conducting the Hollywood Symphony Orchestra (HSO 333)
- Hollywood Symphony Orchestra: "Orchestral Fireworks" (Music for Pleasure, 1966)
- "Masquerade" (1988) composed by John Barry conducting the Hollywood Symphony Orchestra (Prometheus ASIN B00009OOPQ)
- "Martinis with Mancini: The Henry Mancini Songbook" – the Hollywood Symphony Orchestra (Boomerang B00000BMYV)
- Hollywood Symphony Orchestra: "Star Wars" (Big Ear Music R 413593)
- Hollywood Symphony Orchestra: Music Inspired by "Burn the Floor" (Big Ear Music R 477969)
- Hollywood Symphony Orchestra: Musical Tribute to James Bond 007 (Big Ear Music R 450599)
- "Escape to Victory" (1981) (score released 2006) composed by Bill Conti conducting the Hollywood Symphony Orchestra (Prometheus B000CQJYFE)
- "The Swarm" (1978) (score released 2004) composed by Jerry Goldsmith conducting the Hollywood Symphony Orchestra (Prometheus B00009OOPT)
