= Nehrim: At Fate's Edge =

Total conversion mod of The Elder Scrolls IV: Oblivion

- The Nehrim logo
- Developer: SureAI
- Engine: Gamebryo
- Platform: Microsoft Windows
- Release: German: June 9, 2010; English: September 11, 2010
- Genres: First person, action role-playing, sandbox
- Mode: Single-player

Nehrim: At Fate's Edge is a total conversion mod of The Elder Scrolls IV: Oblivion developed by the German team SureAI over the span of four years. It was released in German on June 9, 2010, and subsequently in English on September 11, 2010, to positive reviews. A sequel, Enderal: The Shards of Order, was released in 2016.

== Gameplay ==
As a total conversion mod, Nehrim completely departs from Oblivion in several regards and redesigns other aspects of the game. Whereas Oblivion featured a fast travel system and enemies that leveled up along with the player, Nehrim removed the fast travel option in favour of a spell-based teleportation system which uses teleportation runes, and has fixed-level enemies to provide the player with a sense of progression in power. Other departures from Oblivion include a traditional experience point-based leveling system instead of Oblivion's skill-based leveling approach. Nehrim is also set in a completely different universe from The Elder Scrolls series, with its own races, stories, lore, and so on.

== Development ==
The game was developed by a core team of 12 people, supported by over 50 professional voice actors, and several volunteers for testing and various tasks; the development took a total of four years. It also makes use of previously developed Oblivion mods, such as "Ren's Beauty Pack", which improves the appearance of non-player characters, and "Qarl's Texture Pack", which allows for the use of high-resolution textures. Initially released in German only, an English version was made available by September 2010. Nehrim received a Steam release on June 10, 2020, with achievement support.

== Reception and legacy ==
PC PowerPlay reviewed the game and gave it a 9 out of 10, remarking "Nehrim isn't merely a mod; it's the watermark for whatever Bethesda has planned for The Elder Scrolls V to surpass." Nehrim received Mod DB's "Best Singleplayer Mod" for 2010. It also was nominated for their "Best Upcoming Mod" in 2008. PC Gamer US also awarded Nehrim as the "Mod of the Year" for 2010. GameFront picked it in their selection of "Best Mods of the Year" for 2010, along with seven other mods. Nehrim was followed by Enderal, a total conversion mod of The Elder Scrolls V: Skyrim.
