= Survivor Greece (2018) =

- Presented by: Sakis Tanimanidis; Giorgos Lianos
- No. of days: 177
- No. of castaways: 32
- Winner: Ilias Gotsis
- Location: Las Terrenas, Samaná, Dominican Republic
- No. of episodes: 117

Release
- Original release: January 21 – July 13, 2018

Additional information
- Filming dates: January 18 – July 13, 2018

Season chronology
- ← Previous season 5 Next → season 7

Survivor 2018 is the sixth season of Survivor Greece, the Greek version of the popular reality show. The season aired on Skai TV on January 21, 2018 in Greece and in Cyprus started airing the same day on Sigma TV. It is hosted by Sakis Tanimanidis & Giorgos Lianos. The show is produced by the company Acun Medya, which is owned and directed by Acun Ilıcalı. It is also being broadcast abroad via SKAI's international stations. Twelve players and twelve celebrities have been known in Greece through their work are invited to survive on a deserted island, the exotic Dominican Republic, for 6 months, having their luggage, the necessary clothes and basic food supply. Two players, one on each tribe joined them at second week. After 9 weeks from the beginning of the game, 6 new players, three on each team, joined the tribes. On episode 101, the last team match took place and on episode 102, individual matches started. The Finals were held on 11, 12 & 13 July live in the open theatre of Alsos Veikou, Galatsi, Athens. The winner of sixth season was Ilias Gotsis from the team "Warriors" (Μαχητές).

On January 15, 2018 the team of Celebrities travelled from Greece to Dominican Republic and the team Warriors and Sakis Tanimanidis also travelled from Athens the next day to Dominican Republic.

From Greece, Doretta Papadimitriou is hosting the sister show (spin-off show) of Survivor, named Edo Survivor and premiered the same day with Survivor at 19:00 on Skai TV and aired on weekdays at 17:00 on Skai TV. After 3 weeks this show named Survivor Panorama and kept Doretta as the host but the show aired at 17:30 on Skai TV. Also, among Doretta two players from the previous season Evridiki Valavani from Diasimoi (Celebrities) team and Konstantinos Vasalos from Machites (Warriors) team are present in the program's panel among occasional guests.

== Contestants ==
The names of the original tribes were Mαχητές (Machites, meaning warriors), and Διάσημοι (Diasimoi, meaning celebrities). On Episode 4 entered the game Konstantina Spyropoulou for Diasimoi team and Zoi Andronikou for Machites team. On ninth week were added Evi Saltaferidou, Evi Scaroni and Sozon Palaistros-Charos for Diasimoi team and Maria 'Iron Barbie', Pantazi Felicia Tsalapati and Panos Theodorou for Machites Team.

List of Survivor Greece 2018 contestants
Contestant	Original tribe	Switched tribe	Merged tribe	Statistiscs	Final Symbols	Finish
Alexandros Parthenis; 43, Actor, Model	Diasimoi			55%	0	1st Voted Out; Episode 4
Aggeliki Kokalitsa; 26, Trikala, Kick Boxer	Machites			17%	0	2nd Voted Out; Episode 8
Katerina Chalikia; 39, Kaisariani, Basketball Player	Diasimoi			38%	0	3rd Voted Out; Episode 12
Marina Pichou; 25, Trikala, Gymnast	Machites			31%	0	4th Voted Out; Episode 16
Nikos Thomas; 43, Piraeus, Cinematographer	Machites			39%	0	5th Voted Out; Episode 20
Zoi Andronikidou; 20, Thessaloniki, Taekwondo Athlete	Machites			48%	0	Walked; Episode 24
Eleni Chatzidou; 37, Thessaloniki, Singer	Diasimoi			48%	0	6th Voted Out; Episode 25
Maria Samarinou; 22, Thessaloniki, Skier	Diasimoi			59%	0	Walked; Episode 29
Xenia Evven-REC; 28, Singer	Diasimoi			44%	0	7th Voted Out; Episode 30
Ioannis Drymonakos; 33, European Swimming Champion	Diasimoi			52%	0	8th Voted Out; Episode 35
Konstantina Spyropoulou; 29, Rhodes, TV Presenter	Diasimoi			33%	0	9th Voted Out; Episode 40
Evi Skaroni; 27, Athens, Personal Trainer	Diasimoi			23%	0	10th Voted Out; Episode 45
Thodoris Theodoropoulos; 37, Athens, Model	Machites			41%	0	Evacuated; Episode 47
Maria 'Iron Barbie' Pantazi; Melissia, Kickboxer World Champion	Machites			33%	0	11th Voted Out; Episode 48
Olga Farmaki; 32, Fashion blogger, Βusinessman	Diasimoi			52%	0	Walked; Episode 52
Felicia Tsalapati; Athens, Journalist	Machites			27%	0	12th Voted Out; Episode 56
Stelios Kritikos; 44, Rhodes, Actor	Diasimoi			50%	0	13th Voted Out; Episode 66
Sozon Palaistros-Charos; 39, Lemnos, Field hockey coach	Diasimoi			47%	0	14th Voted Out; Episode 71
Konstantinos Tsepanis; 32, Koukaki, Wrestling Champion, Plumber	Machites	Diasimoi		37%	0	15th Voted Out; Episode 76
Darya Turovnik; 20, Cyprus, Model	Machites	Machites		48%	3	16th Voted Out; Episode 81
Nasos Papargyropoulos; 32, Βusinessman, Actor	Diasimoi	Machites		42%	2	17th Voted Out; Episode 86
Michalis Mouroutsos; 37, Athens, Olympic Taekwondo Champion	Diasimoi	Diasimoi		43%	0	18th Voted Out; Episode 91
Rodanthi Kaparou Kaparaki; 19, Heraklion, P.E.Student	Machites	Machites		29%	0	19th Voted Out; Episode 96
Evi Saltaferidou; 28, Thessaloniki, Gymnast	Diasimoi	Machites		57%	3	20th Voted Out; Episode 101
Ioannis Tsilis; 31, Ioannina, Rowing Athlete	Diasimoi	Diasimoi	Merged Tribe	48%	3	21st Voted Out; Episode 106
Panos Theodorou; 36, Volos, P.E. Teacher, Sports Programs Creator	Machites	Machites	Merged Tribe	57%	1	22nd Voted Out; Episode 109
Nikolas Agorou; 26, Athens, Μeter Focus Center	Machites	Machites	Merged Tribe	54%	3	23rd Voted Out; Episode 111
Charis Giakoumatos; 36, Chalandri, Βusinessman	Machites	Diasimoi	Merged Tribe	53%	1	24th Voted Out; Episode 113
Virginia Dikaioulia; 22, Mytilene, Volleyball Player	Machites	Diasimoi	Merged Tribe	36%	2	Quarter-Final; Episode 115
Melina Metaxa; 31, Limassol, Zakynthos, Breakdancer	Machites	Diasimoi	Merged Tribe	57%	0	Semi-Final; Episode 116
Katerina Dalaka; 25, Katerini, Athlete	Diasimoi	Diasimoi	Merged Tribe	62%	5	Runner-Up; Episode 117
Ilias Gotsis; 28, Athens, Personal Trainer	Machites	Machites	Merged Tribe	60%	1	Sole Survivor; Episode 117

== Voting history ==
=== Nominations table ===
	Original tribes																		Switched tribes						Merged Tribe				—N/a
Episode #	3	7	11	15	19	24		29		34	39	44	47		52	55	65	70	75	80	85	90	95	100	105	108	110	112	—N/a
Week #	1	2	3	4	5	6		7		8	9	10	11		13		15	16	17	18	19	20	21	22	23	24		25	—N/a
Tribe	Diasimoi	Machites	Diasimoi	Machites	Machites	Machites	Diasimoi	Diasimoi	Diasimoi	Diasimoi	Diasimoi	Diasimoi	Machites	Machites	Diasimoi	Machites	Diasimoi	Diasimoi	Diasimoi	Machites	Machites	Diasimoi	Machites	Machites	Merge				—N/a
Immunity	Olga & Maria	Darya & Thodoris	Dalaka & Xenia	Ilias & Konstantinos	Rodanthi & Charis	No One	Michalis & Xenia	No One	Michalis & Dalaka	Michalis & Giannis	^{1}Olga & Dalaka	Olga & Stelios	No One	Konstantinos & Darya	No One	Ilias & Melina	Dalaka & Saltaferidou	Saltaferidou & Dalaka	Dalaka & Melina	Panos & Ilias	Nikolas & Ilias	Charis & Giannis	Nikolas	Panos	Melina & Ilias	Virginia & Charis	Dalaka	Ilias	—N/a
Nominated by Immune	Ioannis & Alexandros	Nikos & Rodanthi	Chalikia & Chatzidou	Marina & Darya	Thodoris & Nikos	No One	Konstantina & Ioannis	No One	Xenia & Ιοannis	Ioannis & Nasos	Nasos & Stelios	Sozon & Saltaferidou	No One	Pantazi & Rodanthi	No One	Felicia & Konstantinos	Nasos & Stelios	Nasos & Michalis	Virginia & Charis	Darya & Nasos	Nasos & Saltaferidou	Michalis & Melina	Panos	Nikolas	Panos & Giannis	Panos & Ilias	Ilias	Charis	—N/a
Nominated by Group	Eleni	Aggeliki	Konstantina	Rodanthi	Nikolas	No One	Eleni	No One	Konstantina	Konstantina	Konstantina	Skaroni	No One	Felicia	No One	Rodanthi	Sozon	Sozon	Konstantinos	Rodanthi	Rodanthi	Virginia	Rodanthi	Saltaferidou	Nikolas	Nikolas	Nikolas	Virginia	—N/a
Nominated	Ioannis, Eleni & Alexandros	Aggeliki, Nikos & Rodanthi	Konstantina, Chatzidou & Chalikia	Rodanthi, Marina & Darya	Nikolas, Thodoris & Nikos	No One	Eleni, Konstantina & Ioannis	No One	Konstantina, Xenia & Giannis	Nasos, Konstantina & Ioannis	Nasos, Konstantina & Stelios	Skaroni, Sozon & Saltaferidou	No One	Felicia, Pantazi & Rodanthi	No One	Rodanthi, Felicia & Konstantinos	Sozon, Nasos & Stelios	Sozon, Nasos & Michalis	Konstantinos, Virginia & Charis	Rodanthi, Darya & Nasos	Rodanthi, Nasos & Saltaferidou	Virginia, Michalis & Melina	Rodanthi & Panos	Saltaferidou & Nikolas	Nikolas, Panos & Giannis	Nikolas, Panos & Ilias	Nikolas & Ilias	Virginia & Charis	—N/a
Votes	6-4-2	10-3	7-5	10-1-1	7-4	-	6-5	-	8-1	6-2	8-1-1	6-2-1	-	6-5	-	9-1	6-1	5-1	4-3	6-1	5-1	4-2	4-1	3-1	5-3	4-3	4-2	4-1	—N/a
Eliminated	Alexandros; Fewest votes by public to save	Aggeliki; Fewest votes by public to save	Chalikia; Fewest votes by public to save	Marina; Fewest votes by public to save	Nikos; Fewest votes by public to save	Zoi; Walked	Eleni; Fewest votes by public to save	Maria; Walked	Xenia; Fewest votes by public to save	Ioannis; Fewest votes by public to save	Konstantina; Fewest votes by public to save	Skaroni; Fewest votes by public to save	Thodoris; Evacuated	Pantazi; Fewest votes by public to save	Olga; Walked	Felicia; Fewest votes by public to save	Stelios; Fewest votes by public to save	Sozon; Fewest votes by public to save	Konstantinos; Fewest votes by public to save	Darya; Fewest votes by public to save	Nasos; Fewest votes by public to save	Michalis; Fewest votes by public to save	Rodanthi; Fewest votes by public to save	Saltaferidou; Fewest votes by public to save	Giannis; Fewest votes by public to save	Panos; Fewest votes by public to save	Nikolas; Fewest votes by public to save	Charis; Fewest votes by public to save	—N/a
Voter	Vote																												
Ilias		Aggeliki		Rodanthi	Nikolas									Rodanthi		Rodanthi				Rodanthi	Rodanthi		Rodanthi	Saltaferidou	Giannis	Melina	Virginia	Virginia	Finalist
Dalaka	Alexandros		Konstantina				Konstantina		Konstantina	Konstantina	Konstantina	Skaroni					Sozon	Sozon	Konstantinos			Virginia			Nikolas	Nikolas	Nikolas	Virginia	Finalist
Melina		Aggeliki		Rodanthi	Nikolas									Rodanthi		Rodanthi			Konstantinos			Virginia			Nikolas	Nikolas	Nikolas	Virginia	Finalist
Virginia		Aggeliki		Rodanthi	Nikolas									Felicia		Rodanthi			Konstantinos			Michalis			Nikolas	Nikolas	Nikolas	Melina	Finalist
Charis		Aggeliki		Rodanthi	Nikolas									Felicia		Rodanthi			Konstantinos			Michalis			Nikolas	Nikolas	Nikolas	Virginia	Eliminated
Nikolas		Aggeliki		Rodanthi	Zoi									Felicia		Rodanthi				Rodanthi	Rodanthi		Rodanthi	Saltaferidou	Giannis	Melina	Virginia	Eliminated	
Panos	Not in the game													Rodanthi		Rodanthi				Rodanthi	Rodanthi		Rodanthi	Saltaferidou	Giannis	Melina	Eliminated		
Giannis	Eleni		Konstantina				Eleni		Konstantina	Konstantina	Konstantina	Skaroni					Sozon	Sozon	Virginia			Virginia			Nikolas	Eliminated			
Saltaferidou	Not in the game										Konstantina	Sozon					Sozon	Sozon		Rodanthi	Rodanthi		Rodanthi	Ilias	Eliminated				
Rodanthi		Aggeliki		Nikos	Nikolas									Felicia		Felicia				Nasos	Nasos		Panos	Eliminated					
Michalis	Eleni		Konstantina				Eleni		Konstantina	Konstantina	Konstantina	Skaroni					Sozon	Sozon	Virginia			Virginia	Eliminated						
Nasos	Eleni		Konstantina				Eleni		Konstantina	Konstantina	Konstantina	Skaroni					Sozon	Sozon		Rodanthi	Rodanthi	Eliminated							
Darya		Aggeliki		Rodanthi	Zoi									Felicia		Rodanthi				Rodanthi	Eliminated								
Konstantinos		Aggeliki		Rodanthi	Zoi									Felicia		Rodanthi			Virginia	Eliminated									
Sozon	Not in the game										Konstantina	Saltaferidou					Stelios	Giannis	Eliminated										
Stelios	Eleni		Konstantina				Eleni		Konstantina	Konstantina	Konstantina	Skaroni					Sozon	Eliminated											
Felicia	Not in the game													Rodanthi		Rodanthi	Eliminated												
Olga	Alexandros		Ioannis				Konstantina		Konstantina	Ioannis	Nasos	Skaroni			Walked														
Pantazi	Not in the game													Rodanthi	Eliminated														
Thodoris		Rodanthi		Zoi	Zoi								Walked																
Skaroni	Not in the game										Konstantina	Sozon	Eliminated																
Konstantina	Not in the game		Ioannis				Eleni		Xenia	Ioannis	Stelios	Eliminated																	
Ioannis	Eleni		Konstantina				Eleni		Konstantina	Konstantina	Eliminated																		
Xenia	Alexandros		Konstantina				Konstantina		Konstantina	Eliminated																			
Maria	Alexandros		Ioannis				Konstantina	Walked																					
Eleni	Ioannis		Ioannis				Konstantina	Eliminated																					
Zoi	Not in the game	Rodanthi		Rodanthi	Nikolas	Walked																							
Nikos		Aggeliki		Rodanthi	Nikolas	Eliminated																							
Marina		Aggeliki		Rodanthi	Eliminated																								
Chalikia	Ioannis		Ioannis	Eliminated																									
Aggeliki		Rodanthi	Eliminated																										
Alexandros	Eleni	Eliminated																											

^1 For this week, new players had immunity.

=== Results of the finals ===
Color key
Result details

- Player was proclaimed as the Winner by the public
- Player was proclaimed as the Runner-Up by the public
- Player was saved by the public
- Player was eliminated by the public
- Player was eliminated
- Two Players won immunity in episode 114 & passed directly to the Semi-Final

Finals
Episode #	115 (Quarter-Final)	116 (Semi-Final)	117 (Final)
Date	11/7/2018	12/7/2018	13/7/2018
Saved	Dalaka; 72%	Ilias; 41%	Ilias; Winner; 61%
Saved	Dalaka; 72%	Dalaka; 35%	Ilias; Winner; 61%
Eliminated	Virginia; 28%	Melina; 24%	Dalaka; Runner-Up; 39%
Player	Public Vote		
Ilias	Won immunity	Saved by the public	Most votes by the public to win Winner
Dalaka	Saved by the public	Saved by the public	Fewest votes by the public to win Runner-Up
Melina	Won immunity	Eliminated by the public 3rd Place	Eliminated
Virginia	Eliminated by the public 4th Place	Eliminated	

== Team matches ==
- From Episode 27, a tournament between Turkey, Romania and Greece started. Red is for Turkey, Yellow for Romania, Blue for Greece.
- Tournament between Turkey, Romania and Greece was canceled. So, from Episode 37, a new tournament started between Turkey and Greece.
- From Episode 62, a new tournament started between Romania and Greece.
- From Episode 78, a new tournament started between Colombia and Greece.

Episode	Winner	Score	Notes
1	Machites	10-9	
2	Machites	10-7	
3	Machites	10-9	Immunity Game
4	Diasimoi	10-7	
5	Machites	10-6	
5	Diasimoi	10-9	Mini Game
6	Machites	10-7	
7	Diasimoi	10-9	Immunity Game
8	Diasimoi	10-7	
9	Diasimoi	10-7	
10	Diasimoi	10-9	
10	Machites	10-4	Mini Game
11	Machites	10-8	Immunity Game
12	Diasimoi	10-1	
13	Machites	10-9	
14	Diasimoi	10-8	
14	Machites	10-5	Mini Game
15	Diasimoi	10-5	Immunity Game
16	Diasimoi	10-5	Communication Reward
17	Diasimoi	10-9	
17	Machites	5-3	Best Players' Game
18	Machites	10-5	Communication Reward
19	Diasimoi	10-3	Immunity Game
20	Diasimoi	10-4	
21	Diasimoi	10-8	
21	Machites	5-1	Best Players' Game
22	Diasimoi	10-7	Communication Reward
23	Machites	10-8	
23	Machites	5-2	Mini Game
24	Machites	10-7	Immunity Game
25	Machites	10-2	
26	Diasimoi	10-9	
26	Diasimoi	5-2	Men's Game
27	Machites	5-0	Women's Game
27	Diasimoi	10-9	
27	Ümit	5-4-3	National Game: Men's Match. *Ilias played for Greece and came third.
27	Larisa	5-4-0	National Game: Women's Match. *Katerina played for Greece and came third.
28	Machites	10-8	Communication Reward
29	Machites	10-5	Immunity Game
30	Machites	10-9	
31	Machites	10-6	
31	Machites	5-4	Men's Game
32	Diasimoi	5-2	Women's Game
32	Diasimoi	10-5	
33	Machites	10-5	Communication Reward
34	Machites	10-5	Immunity Game
35	Machites	10-3	
36	Diasimoi	10-5	
36	Diasimoi	5-2	Men's Game
37	Turkey	10-9	National Game
37	Diasimoi	5-3	Women's Game
38	Machites	10-6	Communication Reward
39	Machites	10-4	Immunity Game
40	Machites	10-7	
40	Charis	—N/a	Symbol Game
40	Dalaka	—N/a	Symbol Game
41	Diasimoi	10-2	
42	Machites	10-6	
42	Diasimoi	5-2	Men's Game
43	Diasimoi	10-5	Communication Reward
43	Machites	5-2	Women's Game
44	Machites	10-6	Immunity Game
45	Diasimoi	10-2	
45	Giannis	—N/a	Symbol Game
45	Virginia	—N/a	Symbol Game
46	Machites	10-6	
47	Diasimoi	10-2	Immunity Game
48	Diasimoi	10-8	Communication Reward
48	Nasos	—N/a	Symbol Game
48	Virginia	—N/a	Symbol Game
49	Diasimoi	10-9	
50	Diasimoi	10-9	
50	Machites	10-7	
51	Machites	10-4	Communication Reward
51	Nikolas	—N/a	Symbol Game
51	Dalaka	—N/a	Symbol Game
52	Diasimoi	10-6	
52	Diasimoi	5-0	Women's Match
53	Diasimoi	10-7	
53	Machites	5-2	Men's Game
54	Diasimoi	10-3	Communication Reward
55	Diasimoi	10-6	Immunity Game
56	Diasimoi	10-6	
56	Giannis	—N/a	Symbol Game
56	Dalaka	—N/a	Symbol Game
57	Diasimoi	10-6	
57	Machites	10-8	Mini Game
58	Diasimoi	10-7	
59	Machites	10-2	Communication Reward
59	Ilias	—N/a	Symbol Game
59	Dalaka	—N/a	Symbol Game
60		—N/a	A party was held to celebrate the Merge of the tribes on the same beach and a match didn't take place.
61	Diasimoi	10-8	
62	Greece	10-7	National Game between the players of Survivor Greece and players of reality show Exatlon România
62		—N/a	Symbol Game Men's Quarterfinal
63	Machites	10-3	Communication Reward
63		—N/a	Symbol Game Women's Quarterfinal
64	Machites	10-8	
65	Machites	10-9	Immunity Game
66	Machites	10-9	
67	Giannis	—N/a	Symbol Game Semi-finals & Final
67	Darya	—N/a	Symbol Game Semi-finals & Final
68	Machites	10-6	
68	Diasimoi	5-0	Best Players' Game
69	Machites	10-4	Communication Reward
70	Machites	10-9	Immunity Game
71	Machites	10-8	
72	Machites	10-3	
73	Romania	10-8	National Game between the players of Survivor Greece and players of reality show Exatlon România
73	Machites	10-7	Mini Game
74	Diasimoi	10-8	Communication Reward
75	Machites	10-8	Immunity Game
76	Machites	10-5	
77	Machites	10-6	
77	Machites	10-5	Mini Game
78	Colombia	10-6	National Game between the players of Survivor Greece and players of reality show Exatlón Colombia
78	Nasos	—N/a	Symbol Game
78	Darya	—N/a	Symbol Game
79	Machites	10-8	Communication Reward
80	Diasimoi	10-5	Immunity Game
81	Diasimoi	10-2	
81	Machites	10-3	Mini Game
82	Diasimoi	10-3	
82	Diasimoi	10-6	Mini Game
83	Machites	10-4	
84	Diasimoi	10-6	Communication Reward
85	Diasimoi	10-3	Immunity Game
86	Diasimoi	10-3	
86	Nikolas	—N/a	Symbol Game
86	Saltaferidou	—N/a	Symbol Game
87	Diasimoi	10-8	
87	Machites	10-3	Mini Game
88	Machites	10-9	Communication Reward
89	Greece	10-9	National Game between the players of Survivor Greece and players of reality show Exatlón Colombia
89	Giannis	—N/a	Symbol Game
89	Saltaferidou	—N/a	Symbol Game
90	Machites	10-7	Immunity Game
91	Diasimoi	10-7	
92	Machites	10-8	
93	Diasimoi	10-2	Communication Reward
93	Panos	—N/a	Symbol Game
93	Dalaka	—N/a	Symbol Game
94	Machites	10-8	
95	Diasimoi	10-6	Immunity Game
96	Greece	10-6	National Game between the players of Survivor Greece and players of reality show Exatlón Colombia
96	Machites	5-1	
97	Machites	10-8	
98	Machites	10-7	
98	Machites	10-5	Mini Game
99	Machites	10-7	Communication Reward
99	Nikolas	—N/a	Symbol Game
99	Saltaferidou	—N/a	Symbol Game
100	Diasimoi	10-9	Immunity Game
101	Diasimoi	10-7	Last Team Match

== Individual matches ==
- In the individual matches, the winner has the ability to choose one player to enjoy the reward with him/her, except the immunities.
- At first two Immunity Games, Dalaka won't play because she won the symbol game and passed directly to the finals.

Episode	Winner(s)	Lives	Notes
102	Nikolas	2/4 Lives	
102	Dalaka	1/4 Lives	
103	Ilias	3/4 Lives	
103	Melina	1/4 Lives	
104	Dalaka	—N/a	Symbol Game; Semi-finals & Final
105	Melina	4/5 Lives	Immunity Game
105	Ilias	1/4 Lives	Immunity Game
106	Charis	3/5 Lives	Communication Reward
106	Melina	2/4 Lives	Communication Reward
107	Charis	2/5 Lives	
107	Dalaka	2/4 Lives	
108	Virginia	2/4 Lives	Immunity Game
108	Charis	1/4 Lives	Immunity Game
109	Melina	2/3 Lives	
109	Nikolas	1/3 Lives	
110	Dalaka	1/5 Lives	Immunity Game
111 (Quiz)	Dalaka	—N/a	The winner won a car.
112	Ilias	4/5 Lives	Immunity Game
113	Ilias	1/5 Lives	
114	Ilias	3/4 Lives	Last Immunity Game. The two winners who won immunity passed directly to the semi-final
114	Melina	3/4 Lives	Last Immunity Game. The two winners who won immunity passed directly to the semi-final
115	Dalaka	3/4 Lives	Last Individual Match

== Finals ==
Episode	Winner	Notes
115	Ilias; Melina	Ilias and Katerina won the immunity and qualify to the semifinal.
116	K.Dalaka; ~~Virginia~~	Katerina and Virginia who didn't win the immunity, went through the public vote to qualify to the Semi-final. Katerina qualified and Virginia was eliminated.
116	Ilias; K.Dalaka; ~~Melina~~	At the Semifinal the last three contestants went through public vote and the two would qualify to the grand final. Ilias and Katerina qualified and Melina was eliminated.
117	Ilias Gotsis	At the Final, Ilias Gotsis was named Sole Survivor 2018. Season finale

== Symbol game ==
=== Players' symbols ===
- The players, who were in the merge, are in the list. The 2 players (man and woman) with the most symbols after the finals, they will travel to Greece in order to meet their families.

Player	Symbols before Quarterfinals	Symbols after Quarterfinals	Symbols after Semi-finals	Final Symbols
Giannis	2	2	2	2
Darya	0	0	0	1
Charis	1	1	0	Eliminated
Nikolas	1	1	1	Eliminated
Dalaka	4	4	2	Eliminated
Melina	0	0	0	Eliminated
Ilias	1	0	Eliminated	
Sozon	0	0	Eliminated	
Nasos	1	0	Eliminated	
Panos	0	0	Eliminated	
Virginia	2	1	Eliminated	
Stelios	0	Eliminated		
Rodanthi	0	Eliminated		
Saltaferidou	0	Eliminated		
Michalis	0	Eliminated		
Konstantinos	0	Eliminated		

- Due to injury, Stelios didn't play in Quarter-Final and he qualified for the Semi-Finals because the number of the players must be even. In episode 65, Stelios was eliminated from the game.

==== Quarterfinals ====
- Player qualified for semi-finals
- Player was eliminated for semi-finals

A player who hasn't won yet a symbol and loses the duel, he won't qualify to semi-finals of symbol game. A player who has won a symbol and loses the duel, he will qualify to semi-finals of symbol game losing a symbol.

Men's Quarterfinals (Episode 62)

Duel	Player	Score	Result
I	Nasos	1	Qualified
I	Panos	2	Qualified
II	Giannis	2	Qualified
II	Konstantinos	1	Eliminated
III	Sozon	2	Qualified
III	Ilias	1	Qualified
IV	Nikolas	2	Qualified
IV	Michalis	1	Eliminated
V	Charis	—N/a	Qualified
V	Stelios	—N/a	Eliminated

Women's Quarterfinals (Episode 63)

Duel	Player	Score	Result
I	Saltaferidou	0	Eliminated
I	Melina	2	Qualified
II	Dalaka	2	Qualified
II	Virginia	0	Qualified
III	Darya	2	Qualified
III	Rodanthi	1	Eliminated

==== Semi-finals ====
Men's Semi-final (Episode 67)

First Phase

Duel	Player	Score	Result
I	Giannis	2	Qualified
I	Panos	1	Eliminated
II	Nasos	1	Eliminated
II	Ilias	2	Qualified
III	Sozon	2	Qualified
III	Charis	1	Qualified
IV	Nikolas	—N/a	Qualified Automatically to the second phase of Semi-finals after a draw

Second Phase

Duel	Player	Score	Result
I	Sozon	1	Eliminated
I	Nikolas	2	Qualified
II	Ilias	1	Eliminated
II	Charis	2	Qualified
III	Giannis	—N/a	Qualified Automatically to the Men's Final after a draw

Women's Semi-final (Episode 67)

First Phase

Duel	Player	Score	Result
I	Darya	2	Qualified
I	Virginia	0	Qualified
II	Dalaka	0	Qualified
II	Melina	2	Qualified

Second Phase

Duel	Player	Score	Result
I	Dalaka	0	Qualified
I	Darya	2	Qualified
II	Virginia	0	Eliminated
II	Melina	2	Qualified

==== Final ====
The players get 2 extra symbols in the final phase.

Men's Final

Player	Place	Symbols before the final	Symbols after the final
Giannis	Winner	4	2
Charis	Runner-Up	2	0
Nikolas	Second Runner-Up	3	0

Women's Final

Player	Place	Symbols before the final	Symbols after the final
Darya	Winner	2	1
Dalaka	Runner-Up	4	0
Melina	Second Runner-Up	2	0

=== New symbol game ===
At episode 78, it was announced that a new symbol game will take place. When the new symbol game is finished, the winner of the new symbol game will pass directly to the Finals of Survivor. The Players will have again the symbols which had before the Quarter-finals of the previous symbol game in order to play.

Players' Symbols before the Finals

Player	Symbols before Finals	Result
Dalaka	5	Qualified to the Symbol Game Finals
Giannis	3	Qualified to the Symbol Game Finals
Nikolas	3	Qualified to the Symbol Game Finals
Virginia	2	Qualified to the Symbol Game Finals
Charis	1	Qualified to the Symbol Game Finals
Ilias	1	Qualified to the Symbol Game Finals
Panos	1	Qualified to the Symbol Game Finals
Melina	0	Qualified to the Symbol Game Finals
Saltaferidou	3	Eliminated at Episode 101
Rodanthi	0	Eliminated at Episode 96
Michalis	0	Eliminated at Episode 91
Nasos	2	Eliminated at Episode 86
Darya	1	Eliminated at Episode 81

Players' Symbols during the Finals

- The women will get 2 extra symbols in order to play all of them at the Finals of symbol game.
- The men will get 3 extra symbols in order to play all of them at the Finals of symbol game.

Player	Symbols before Semi-finals	Symbols after Semi-finals	Final Symbols
Dalaka	7	1	1
Ilias	4	3	Eliminated
Melina	2	Eliminated	
Giannis	6	Eliminated	
Charis	4	Eliminated	
Virginia	4	Eliminated	
Nikolas	6	Eliminated	
Panos	4	Eliminated	

==== Women's Semi-final (Episode 104) ====
Player	Place	Symbols before the semi-final	Symbols after the semi-final
Dalaka	Winner	7	1
Melina	Runner-Up	2	0
Virginia	Second Runner-Up	4	0

==== Men's Semi-final (Episode 104) ====
Player	Place	Symbols before the semi-final	Symbols after the semi-final
Ilias	Winner	4	3
Giannis	Runner-Up	6	0
Charis	Second Runner-Up	4	0
Nikolas	4th Place	6	0
Panos	5th Place	4	0

==== Final (Episode 104) ====
- The 2 winners of semi-finals will play at the symbol game final. The winner is the player who will win 5 matches and will keep his/her symbols while the loser of the final will lose his/her symbols.

Player	Final Symbols	Score	Result
Dalaka	1	5	Winner
Ilias	3	2	Runner-Up

== Ratings ==
Episode	Date	Ratings	Share	S15-44	S18-54	Viewers (in millions)	Daily Rank	Weekly Rank
1	21/1/2018	21.5%	45.7%	56.5%	—N/a	2.232	#1	#1
2	22/1/2018	13.5%	30.2%	41.1%	—N/a	1.400	#1	#3
3	23/1/2018	12.5%	29.4%	40.3%	—N/a	1.293	#1	#4
4	24/1/2018	14.2%	34.6%	47.3%	—N/a	1.475	#1	#2
5	28/1/2018	15.4%	41.0%	52.4%	—N/a	1.601	#1	#1
6	29/1/2018	13.3%	32.8%	43.7%	—N/a	1.386	#1	#2
7	30/1/2018	12.3%	30.2%	39.6%	—N/a	1.274	#1	#5
8	31/1/2018	12.7%	30.0%	39.6%	—N/a	1.318	#1	#4
9	4/2/2018	14.2%	34.0%	42.8%	36.7%	1.478	#1	#1
10	5/2/2018	12.1%	27.8%	—N/a	31.7%	1.253	#1	#4
11	6/2/2018	12.3%	29.7%	—N/a	33.9%	1.276	#1	#3
12	7/2/2018	11.7%	27.7%	—N/a	33.9%	1.218	#1	#5
13	11/2/2018	13.9%	37.3%	—N/a	37.9%	1.444	#1	#1
14	12/2/2018	12.2%	29.9%	—N/a	35.5%	1.271	#1	#3
15	13/2/2018	11.6%	28.2%	—N/a	32.3%	1.202	#1	#4
16	14/2/2018	11.0%	27.2%	—N/a	33.4%	1.143	#1	#5
17	18/2/2018	12.6%	36.5%	—N/a	38.5%	1.310	#1	#2
18	19/2/2018	12.8%	31.8%	—N/a	30.0%	1.329	#1	#3
19	20/2/2018	12.0%	28.5%	—N/a	31.4%	1.249	#1	#4
20	21/2/2018	13.4%	31.8%	—N/a	39.7%	1.387	#1	#2
21	25/2/2018	14.0%	35.2%	—N/a	37.2%	1.453	#1	#1
22	26/2/2018	13.3%	34.2%	—N/a	38.1%	1.380	#1	#4
23	27/2/2018	13.7%	32.7%	—N/a	35.8%	1.427	#1	#3
24	28/2/2018	13.8%	36.0%	—N/a	42.3%	1.435	#1	#2
25	1/3/2018	13.0%	32.6%	—N/a	35.9%	1.345	#1	#5
26	4/3/2018	15.4%	39.9%	—N/a		1.597	#1	#1
27	5/3/2018	11.4%	29.5%	—N/a	33.4%	1.183	#1	#8
28	6/3/2018	12.2%	32.4%	—N/a	36.5%	1.269	#1	#3
29	7/3/2018	13.5%	34.8%	—N/a	37.8%	1.406	#1	#2
30	8/3/2018	12.1%	31.8%	—N/a	33.5%	1.258	#1	#4
31	11/3/2018	13.7%	36.8%	—N/a		1.421	#1	#1
32	12/3/2018	11.6%	29.9%	—N/a	32.4%	1.203	#1	#5
33	13/3/2018	11.7%	31.4%	—N/a	32.9%	1.218	#2	#3
34	14/3/2018	11.7%	29.8%	—N/a	32.4%	1.216	#1	#4
35	15/3/2018	11.5%	29.4%	—N/a	34.1%	1.184	#2	#8
36	18/3/2018	15.5%	40.9%	—N/a	41.2%	1.613	#1	#1
37	19/3/2018	13.2%	32.4%	—N/a	33.3%	1.367	#1	#2
38	20/3/2018	11.2%	29.9%	—N/a	34.2%	1.164	#1	#5
39	21/3/2018	12.0%	32.1%	—N/a	35.5%	1.244	#1	#3
40	22/3/2018	11.8%	29.7%	—N/a	31.3%	1.225	#1	#4
41	25/3/2018	13.8%	34.7%	—N/a		1.429	#1	#1
42	26/3/2018	12.5%	30.4%	—N/a	36.6%	1.296	#1	#3
43	27/3/2018	11.8%	29.7%	—N/a	30.7%	1.227	#1	#4
44	28/3/2018	12.9%	32.9%	—N/a	34.8%	1.337	#1	#2
45	29/3/2018	11.3%	29.6%	—N/a	30.8%	1.172	#1	#6
46	1/4/2018	13.9%	35.8%	—N/a		1.442	#1	#1
47	2/4/2018	12.7%	31.4%	—N/a	32.7%	1.321	#1	#1
48	3/4/2018	10.9%	29.1%	—N/a	29.9%	1.136	#1	#2
49	10/4/2018	12.1%	34.2%	—N/a	33.5%	1.260	#1	#2
50	11/4/2018	10.9%	29.0%	—N/a	28.7%	1.133	#1	#3
51	12/4/2018	10.5%	27.2%	—N/a	28.3%	1.089	#1	#4
52	15/4/2018	12.4%	32.9%	—N/a	31.9%	1.284	#1	#1
53	16/4/2018	13.0%	33.3%	—N/a	33.5%	1.354	#1	#1
54	17/4/2018	11.0%	28.1%	—N/a	27.8%	1.139	#1	#6
55	18/4/2018	11.7%	30.5%	—N/a	30.0%	1.215	#1	#4
56	19/4/2018	11.9%	31.2%	—N/a	32.9%	1.238	#1	#3
57	22/4/2018	12.3%	34.1%	—N/a	33.0%	1.274	#1	#2
58	23/4/2018	11.3%	29.7%	—N/a	31.8%	1.173	#1	#3
59	24/4/2018	10.9%	27.1%	—N/a		1.120	#2	#6
60	25/4/2018	13.1%	34.5%	—N/a	35.4%	1.359	#1	#1
61	26/4/2018	10.9%	28.1%	—N/a	28.4%	1.129	#1	#5
62	29/4/2018	12.9%	36.5%	—N/a		1.336	#1	#2
63	30/4/2018	9.8%	25.5%	—N/a	22.2%	1.015	#2	#11
64	1/5/2018	10.0%	26.8%	—N/a	24.9%	1.042	#1	#8
65	2/5/2018	11.4%	27.5%	—N/a	27.3%	1.185	#1	#3
66	3/5/2018	12.0%	30.9%	—N/a	31.7%	1.243	#1	#2
67	6/5/2018	12.4%	32.4%	—N/a		1.284	#1	#1
68	7/5/2018	8.7%	20.7%	—N/a	18.7%	0.906	#3	#13
69	8/5/2018	10.7%	26.7%	—N/a	23.4%	1.113	#1	#6
70	9/5/2018	11.6%	31.1%	—N/a	32.0%	1.206	#1	#4
71	10/5/2018	11.1%	27.1%	—N/a	26.2%	1.152	#1	#5
72	13/5/2018	13.5%	37.2%	—N/a	37.0%	1.402	#1	#2
73	14/5/2018	11.2%	27.7%	—N/a	28.1%	1.164	#1	#5
74	15/5/2018	11.2%	30.0%	—N/a	29.2%	1.165	#1	#4
75	16/5/2018	11.7%	31.2%	—N/a		1.215	#1	#1
76	17/5/2018	11.3%	28.9%	—N/a		1.169	#1	#3
77	20/5/2018	11.7%	32.0%	—N/a		1.214	#1	#2
78	21/5/2018	11.1%	30.9%	—N/a		1.148	#1	#4
79	22/5/2018	11.0%	28.9%	—N/a		1.143	#1	#5
80	23/5/2018	12.5%	32.8%	—N/a		1.298	#1	#2
81	24/5/2018	11.2%	29.1%	—N/a		1.161	#1	#3
82	27/5/2018	9.8%	30.1%	—N/a		1.015	#1	#11
83	28/5/2018	11.1%	28.8%	—N/a		1.151	#1	#3
84	29/5/2018	12.7%	32.7%	—N/a		1.319	#1	#1
85	30/5/2018	11.8%	31.8%	—N/a		1.225	#1	#2
86	31/5/2018	10.6%	28.3%	—N/a		1.100	#1	#5
87	3/6/2018	10.4%	31.0%	—N/a		1.076	#1	#6
88	4/6/2018	10.3%	27.6%	—N/a	25.4%	1.067	#2	#6
89	5/6/2018	11.1%	29.9%	—N/a		1.157	#1	#4
90	6/6/2018	12.6%	36.5%	—N/a	43.1%	1.312	#1	#1
91	7/6/2018	11.3%	32.5%	—N/a		1.178	#1	#2
92	10/6/2018	11.3%	33.2%	—N/a		1.175	#1	#3
93	11/6/2018	9.4%	25.8%	—N/a	26.2%	0.975	#2	#13
94	12/6/2018	9.7%	27.4%	—N/a	26.8%	1.005	#2	#12
95	13/6/2018	10.5%	29.6%	—N/a	31.5%	1.099	#1	#8
96	14/6/2018	11.3%	32.5%	—N/a		1.174	#1	#3
97	17/6/2018	10.0%	26.9%	—N/a	23.9%	1.040	#2	#10
98	18/6/2018	9.9%	25.6%	—N/a		1.028	#1	#10
99	19/6/2018	8.7%	22.9%	—N/a		0.902	#3	#17
100	20/6/2018	9.4%	25.9%	—N/a		0.975	#1	#12
101	21/6/2018	9.6%	26.7%	—N/a		0.998	#2	#11
102	24/6/2018	10.9%	30.4%	—N/a		1.133	#1	#5
103	25/6/2018	10.0%	26.1%	—N/a	24.1%	1.040	#1	#13
104	26/6/2018	9.8%	25.0%	—N/a	24.7%	1.022	#2	#17
105	27/6/2018	10.1%	25.6%	—N/a		1.050	#2	#12
106	28/6/2018	8.8%	23.1%	—N/a		0.911	#3	—N/a
107	1/7/2018	8.1%	26.2%	—N/a		0.843	#3	—N/a
108	2/7/2018	10.1%	31.7%	—N/a	30.6%	1.046	#2	#15
109	3/7/2018	8.1%	25.0%	—N/a		0.842	#2	—N/a
110	4/7/2018	10.5%	38.7%	—N/a		1.090	#1	#12
111	5/7/2018	10.7%	37.6%	—N/a		1.114	#1	#10
112	8/7/2018	9.6%	29.7%	—N/a		0.996	#1	#17
113	9/7/2018	10.0%	33.1%	—N/a	29.6%	1.035	#1	#10
114	10/7/2018	9.3%	39.5%	—N/a	38.0%	0.966	#2	#13
115	11/7/2018	7.3%	34.3%	—N/a	32.2%	0.761	#2	#14
116	12/7/2018	9.8%	35.7%	—N/a	36.4%	1.016	#1	#11
117	13/7/2018	10.3%	40.1%	—N/a	38.7%	1.074	#1	#9
