= Trailer (promotion) =

Short video advertising a creative work

Trailer for Universal Pictures' science-fiction horror film Frankenstein (1931)

A trailer (also known as a preview, coming attraction, or attraction video) is a short advertisement, originally designed for a feature film, which highlights key scenes of upcoming features intended to be exhibited in the future at a movie theater or cinema. It is a product of creative and technical work.

Movie trailers have now become popular on DVDs and Blu-ray discs, as well as on the Internet, livestreaming and mobile devices. Of some 10 billion videos watched online annually, film trailers rank third, after news and user-created video.

The trailer format has been adopted as a promotional tool for television shows, video games, books, and theatrical events/concerts.

== History ==
Silent film trailers for The Red Circle (1915, left) and The Phantom of the Opera (1925, right).

The first trailer shown in an American film theater was in November 1913, when Nils Granlund, the advertising manager for the Marcus Loew theater chain, produced a short promotional film for the musical The Pleasure Seekers, opening at the Winter Garden Theatre on Broadway. As reported in a wire service story carried by the Lincoln, Nebraska Daily Star, the practice which Loew adopted was described as "an entirely new and unique stunt", and that "moving pictures of the rehearsals and other incidents connected with the production will be sent out in advance of the show, to be presented to the Loew's picture houses and will take the place of much of the bill board advertising". Granlund was also first to introduce trailer material for an upcoming motion picture, using a slide technique to promote an upcoming film featuring Charlie Chaplin at Loew's Seventh Avenue Theatre in Harlem in 1914.

Due to trailers initially being shown after, or "trailing", the feature film, the term "trailer" was used to describe the promotion. This practice was found to be somewhat ineffective, often ignored by audiences who left immediately after the film. Later, exhibitors changed their practice so that trailers were shown before the main feature, as were cartoon shorts, newsreels, and serial-adventure episodes. Today, more elaborate trailers and commercial advertisements have largely replaced other forms of pre-feature entertainment, and in major multiplex chains, about the first 20 minutes after the posted showtime is devoted to trailers.

Trailer for The African Queen (1951)

Until the late 1950s, trailers were mostly created by National Screen Service and consisted of various key scenes from the film being advertised, often augmented with large, descriptive text describing the story, and an underscore generally pulled from studio music libraries. Most trailers had some form of narration, and those that did featured stentorian voices, a practice that would wane in the 2000s.

In the early 1960s, the face of motion picture trailers changed. Textless, montage trailers and quick-editing became popular, largely due to the arrival of the New Hollywood and techniques that were becoming increasingly popular in television. Among the trend setters were Stanley Kubrick with his montage trailers for Lolita (1962), Dr. Strangelove or: How I Learned to Stop Worrying and Love the Bomb (1964), and 2001: A Space Odyssey (1968). Kubrick's main inspiration for the Dr. Strangelove trailer was the short film Very Nice, Very Nice (1961) by Canadian film visionary Arthur Lipsett. Pablo Ferro, who pioneered the techniques Kubrick required as necessary elements for the success of his campaign, created the Dr. Strangelove trailer, as well as the award-winning trailer for A Clockwork Orange (1971).

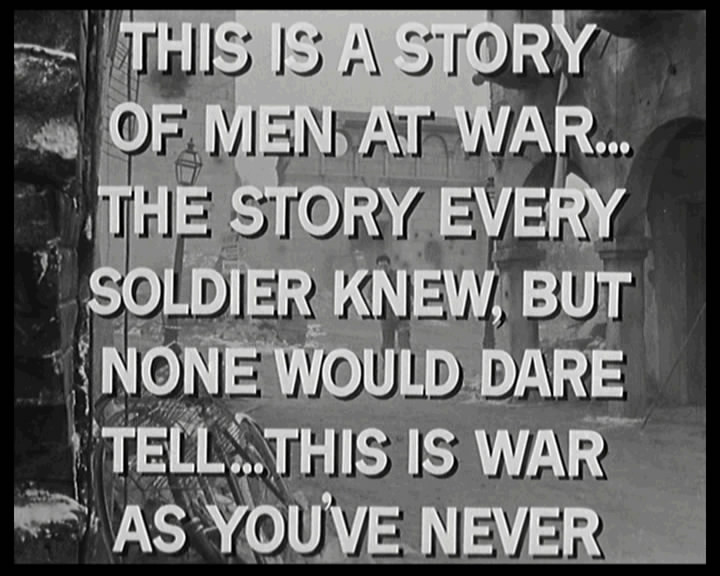
Frame from the 1956 trailer for the war film Attack!

2013 trailer for The Wolverine by 20th Century Fox

Many home videos contain trailers for other movies produced by the same company scheduled to be available shortly after the legal release of the video, so as not to spend money advertising the videos on TV. Most VHS tapes would play them at the beginning of the tape, but some VHS tapes contained previews at the end of the film or at both ends of the tape. VHS tapes that contained trailers at the end usually reminded the viewer to "Stay tuned after the feature for more previews." With DVDs and Blu-rays, and live streaming and mobile devices, trailers can operate as a bonus feature instead of having to watch through the trailers before the film.

In summer 1993, the major movie studios started to make trailers available online with the Walt Disney Company providing promotions for Guilty as Sin, Life With Mikey and Super Mario Bros. available to Macintosh users via CompuServe and Columbia Pictures posting a trailer for In the Line of Fire available for download to AOL subscribers.

Beginning in the mid-to-late 2010s, many trailers have begun to incorporate a short 5- to 10-second preview of the trailer, sometimes called a "micro-teaser", at the very beginning of the video for the trailer itself. This has been explained as being a way to grab the viewer's attention quickly, so that they do not choose to skip the full trailer on streaming sites.

== Definition ==
Trailers consist of a series of selected shots from the film being advertised. Since the purpose of the trailer is to attract an audience to the film, these excerpts are usually drawn from the most exciting, funny, or otherwise noteworthy parts of the film but in abbreviated form and usually without producing spoilers. For this purpose the scenes are not necessarily in the order in which they appear in the film. A trailer has to achieve that in less than 2 minutes and 30 seconds, the maximum length allowed by the MPA. Each studio or distributor is allowed to exceed this time limit once a year, if they feel it is necessary for a particular film.

In January 2014, the movie theater trade group Cinema United issued an industry guideline asking that film distributors supply trailers that run no longer than two minutes, which is 30 seconds shorter than the prior norm. The guideline is not mandatory, and also allows for limited exceptions of a select few movies having longer trailers. Film distributors reacted coolly to the announcement. There had been no visible disputes on trailer running time prior to the guideline, which surprised many.

Some trailers use "special shoot" footage, which is material that has been created specifically for advertising purposes and does not appear in the actual film. The most notable film to use this technique was Terminator 2: Judgment Day, whose trailer featured an elaborate special effect scene of a T-800 Terminator being assembled in a factory that was never intended to be in the film itself. Dimension Films also shot extra scenes for their 2006 horror remake, Black Christmas - these scenes were used in promotional footage for the film, but are similarly absent from the theatrical release. A trailer for the 2002 blockbuster Spider-Man had an entire action sequence especially constructed that involved escaping bank robbers in a helicopter getting caught in a giant web between the World Trade Center's two towers. However, after the September 11 attacks the studio pulled it from theaters.

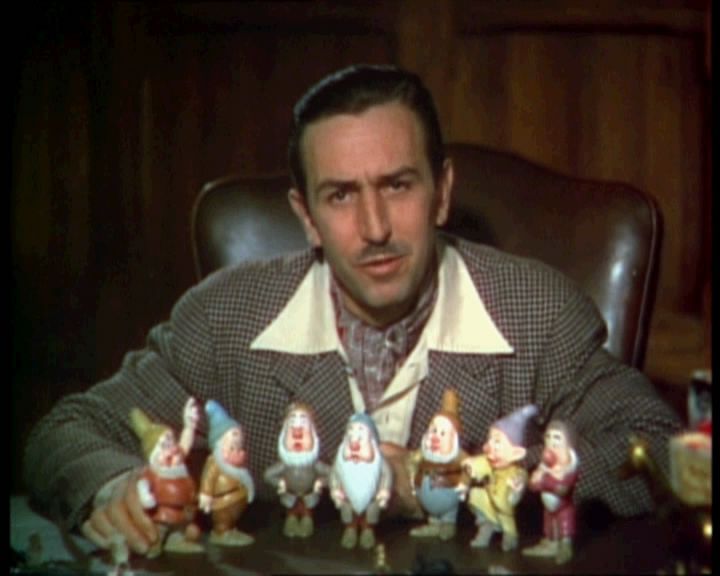
Walt Disney in a 1937 color trailer for the animated musical fantasy film Snow White and the Seven Dwarfs

One of the most famous "special shoot" trailers is that used for the 1960s thriller Psycho, which featured director Alfred Hitchcock giving viewers a guided tour of the Bates Motel, eventually arriving at the infamous shower. At this point, the soft-spoken Hitchcock suddenly throws the shower curtain back to reveal Vera Miles with a blood-curdling scream. As the trailer, in fact, was made after completion of the film when Janet Leigh was no longer available for filming, Hitchcock had Miles don a blonde wig for the fleeting sequence. Since the title, "Psycho", instantly covers most of the screen, the switch went unnoticed by audiences for years until freeze-frame analysis clearly revealed that it was Vera Miles and not Janet Leigh in the shower during the trailer.

In the United States there are dozens of companies, many of which are in Los Angeles and New York City, that specialize in the creation of film trailers. The trailer may be created at agencies (such as The Cimarron Group, MOJO, The Ant Farm, Ben Cain, Aspect Ratio, Flyer Entertainment, Trailer Park, Buddha Jones) while the film itself is being cut together at the studio. Since the edited film does not exist at this point, the trailer editors work from rushes or dailies. Thus, the trailer may contain footage that is not in the final movie, or the trailer editor and the film editor may use different takes of a particular shot. Another common technique is including music on the trailer which does not appear on the movie's soundtrack. This is nearly always a requirement, as trailers and teasers are created long before the composer has even been hired for the film score—sometimes as much as a year ahead of the movie's release date—while composers are usually the last creative people to work on the film.

Some trailers that incorporate material not in the film are particularly coveted by collectors, especially trailers for classic films. For example, in a trailer for Casablanca the character Rick Blaine says, "OK, you asked for it!" before shooting Major Strasser; this line of dialogue is not spoken in the final film.

== Accusations of misdirection ==
Over the years, there have been many instances where trailers have been purported to give misleading representations of their films. They may give the impression that a celebrity who only has a minor part in the film is one of the main cast members, or advertising a film as being more action-packed than it is. These tricks are usually done to draw in a larger audience. Sometimes the trailers include footage not from the film itself. This could be an artistic choice, or because many times, trailer editors are given dailies, basically individual clips, instead of a cut of the whole film. Often, the film is still in production while the trailer is in the works. While the intention is not to be misleading, due to the nature of dailies being easily replaced, sometimes certain shots that are present in the trailer are nowhere to be seen in the final film. Furthermore, trailers could be misleading in a 'for the audience's own good' kind of way, in that a general audience would not usually see such a film due to preconceptions, and by bait and switching, they can allow the audience to have a great viewing experience that they would not ordinarily have. However, the opposite is true too, with the promise of great trailers being let down by mediocre films. An American woman sued the makers of Drive because their film "failed to live up to its promo's promise", although her lawsuit was dismissed. In August 2016, an American lawyer attempted to sue Suicide Squad for false advertising over lack of scenes including Joker.

== Composition ==
Trailers tell the story of a film in a highly condensed fashion to have maximum appeal. In the decades since film marketing has become a large industry, trailers have become highly polished pieces of advertising, able to present even poor movies in an attractive light. Some of the elements common to many trailers are listed below. Trailers are typically made up of scenes from the film they are promoting, but sometimes contain deleted scenes from the film.

The key ambition in trailer-making is to impart an intriguing story that gets film audiences emotionally involved.

Most trailers have a three-act structure similar to a feature-length film. They start with a beginning (act 1) that lays out the premise of the story. The middle (act 2) drives the story further and usually ends with a dramatic climax. Act 3 usually features a strong piece of "signature music" (either a recognizable song or a powerful, sweeping orchestral piece). This last act often consists of a visual montage of powerful and emotional moments of the film and may also contain a cast run if there are noteworthy stars that could help sell the movie.

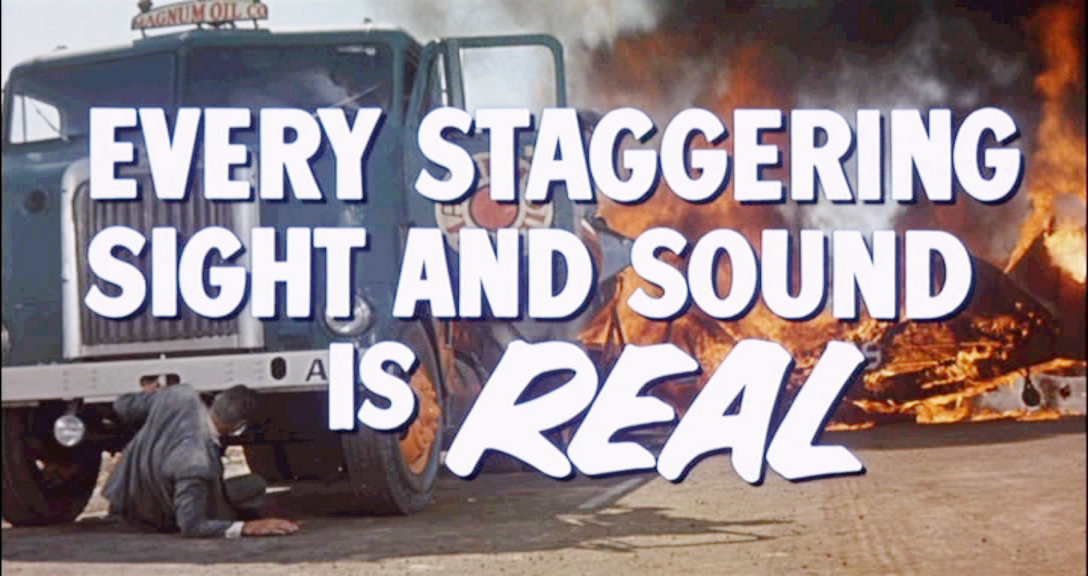
Screenshot from film trailer for 1959 North by Northwest

Voice-over narration is sometimes used to briefly set up the premise of the film and provide explanation when necessary, although this practice has declined in the years after the passing of voice-over artist Don LaFontaine. Since the trailer is a highly condensed format, voice-over is a useful tool to enhance the audience's understanding of the plot. Hollywood trailers of the classic film era were renowned for clichés such as "Colossal!", "Stupendous!", etc. Some trailers have used voice over clichés for satirical effect. This can be seen in trailers for films such as Jerry Seinfeld's Comedian and Tenacious D in The Pick of Destiny.

Music helps set the tone and mood of the trailer. Usually the music used in the trailer is not from the film itself (the film score may not have been composed yet). The music used in the trailer may be:

- Music from the score of other movies.
- Popular or well-known music, often chosen for its tone, appropriateness of a lyric or lack thereof, or recognizability. The most often used of these is O Fortuna from Carmina Burana by Carl Orff, as well as the works of E.S. Posthumus and Beethoven. Popular music may be selected for its tone (i.e. hard rock for an action film, lighter pop for a romantic comedy), or to establish context (e.g. the trailer for a film set in the 1940s might use big band swing).
- "Library" music previously composed specifically to be used in advertising by an independent composer. There are many trailer music library companies which produce trailer music, some of the best known are audiomachine, Two Steps From Hell, Immediate Music and X-Ray Dog or SFX and Music libraries like the ones from Moss Landing, Gerrit Kinkel Productions or RedCola Music.
- Specially composed music. One of the most famous Hollywood trailer music composers, credited with creating the musical voice of contemporary trailers, is John Beal, who began scoring trailers in the 1970s and, in the course of a thirty-year career, created original music for over 2,000 film trailer projects, including 40 of the top-grossing films of all time, such as Star Wars, Forrest Gump, Titanic, Aladdin, Braveheart, Ghost, The Last Samurai and The Matrix. He is considered by the New York Times as the pioneer of original scores for film trailer music,

A cast run is a list of the stars that appear in the movie. If the director or producer is well-known or has made other popular movies, they often warrant a mention as well. Most trailers conclude with a billing block, which is a list of the principal cast and crew. It is the same list that appears on posters and print publicity materials, and also usually appears on-screen at the beginning (or end) of the movie. Studio production logos are usually featured near the beginning of the trailer. Until the late 1970s, they were put only at the end of the trailer or not used at all; however, Paramount Pictures was the first studio to use its actual studio logo at the beginning of its trailers in the 1940s. Often there will be logos for both the production company and distributor of the film.

Many trailers are mixed in Dolby Digital or any other multichannel sound mix. Scenes including sound effects and music that are enhanced by stereophonic sound are therefore the focus point of many modern trailers.

Trailers preceding feature films are generally presented in the same format as the feature, being either 35 mm film or a digital format. High bandwidth internet connections allow for trailers to be distributed online at any resolution. Since the advent of Digital 3D, it has become common for a 3D feature film to be preceded by one or more trailers that are also presented in 3D.

One relatively recent trend is the incorporation of so called "bumpers", which are very short fast-paced edits placed at the beginning of a trailer to provide a small tease of what will be shown. Following the spike of short videos across social media, bumpers are intended to quickly grab viewers' attention so that they are encouraged to watch the entire trailer to the end.

== Collections ==
National Screen Service contracts required that trailers be returned (at the cinema's expense) or destroyed; however, it required no proof of destruction, and depositing them in a waste bin counted. A market for trailers evolved as it became clear that some had a commercial value to collectors. Many of the trailers for films like the Star Wars series reported as 'destroyed' were taken back out of the bin and sold by cinema staff. As they cost about $60 each to make (1981 estimate) and were hired to the cinema for $10, such losses led to NSS increasing its rental charges, which led to a decrease in the number of trailers rented and shown to audiences.

Some cinemas also began to show "trailer trash" programs of trailers without a main feature. Similarly, several DVDs containing nothing but trailers for films, typically from exploitation film genres, have been produced for sale.

== Other types of trailers ==
Beginning in the late 1990s to early 2000s, and along with the development of the Internet and sites such as YouTube as well as animation techniques, more types of trailers began to be created due to easier and cheaper costs to produce and show trailers.

=== Video game trailers ===
A trailer for Slap City, which is composed primarily of gameplay footage with text describing the features of the game, and has a brief animated segment revealing a new character. Select moments of footage are non-combat machinima as opposed to organic gameplay.

In the late 1990s to early 2000s, more video game trailers have been produced as they become more mainstream to entice viewers to purchase the game. There are two main types of video game trailers: cinematic and gameplay. Cinematic trailers are usually made entirely separate from the game engine and rely more on CGI. Even though cinematic trailers do not represent actual gameplay and are a divisive promotional tool in the gaming community, they are commonly accepted as part of the advertising necessary to get a game to sell. Gameplay trailers, sometimes referred to as "in-engine" trailers, are made using the game engine and take place inside the game's actual environment. In theory, this implies that actual game footage is recorded and acts as a "what you see is what you get" demonstration, though it is not always the case. For example, Cyberpunk 2077 failed to deliver multiple features it had included in trailers, and the trailer for Aliens: Colonial Marines featured graphics that were of a higher standard than the game that was eventually sold.

=== TV spots ===
TV spots are trailers for movies shown on television that are often shortened to 30–60 seconds. These trailers are similar to green band trailers and have content "appropriate" for the channel.

=== TV show trailers ===
While not initially prevalent in television, TV show trailers started as a common form of advertisement in the late 2000s. They are often trailers advertising a new TV series, episode, event or marathon premiering on television. Trailers for the next episode of a TV series are often shown during or following the closing credits of the show.

=== Book trailer ===
A book trailer is a video advertisement for a book which employs techniques similar to those of movie trailers to promote books and encourage readers. These trailers can also be referred to as "video-podcasts", with higher quality trailers being called "cinematic book trailers". They are circulated on television and online in most common digital video formats. Common formats of book trailers include actors performing scenes from the book akin to a movie trailer, full production trailers, flash videos, animation or simple still photos set to music with text conveying the story. This differs from author readings and interviews, which consist of video footage of the author narrating a portion of their writing or being interviewed. Early book trailers consisted mostly of still images of the book, with some videos incorporating actors, with John Farris's book trailer for his 1986 novel Wildwood incorporating images from the book cover along with actors such as John Zacherle.

In September 2007, the School Library Journal established the Trailie Award for the best book trailers. There are three categories: author/publisher created, student created and librarian/adult created. The award was announced at the School Library Journal Leadership Summit on the Future of Reading on October 22, 2010, in Chicago.

In 2014, Dan Rosen and CV Herst established BookReels, a website dedicated to allowing publishers and authors to post book trailers and other multimedia, culminating in the annual BookReels Awards. BookReels lets readers browse and rate trailers, post comments and reviews, join discussion groups, and share BookReel discoveries.

Cinematic book trailers have become standard marketing tools used by publishers to promote more commercial titles or novels with film potential.

=== Fan-made trailers ===
For popular movies, fans often make trailers on their own. These are unofficial videos by fans utilizing audio or video of a movie, studio trailer, animation techniques, or fan-acted scenes replacing the video of the official trailer.

== Awards ==
Every year there are two main events that give awards to outstanding film trailers: The Key Art Awards, presented by The Hollywood Reporter, and the Golden Trailer Awards. The Golden Trailer Awards and the Key Art Awards pick winners in all creative parts of film advertising, from trailers and TV spots to posters and print ads. The Golden Trailer Awards are currently expanding to add a sister event, The World Trailer Awards, to be a kickoff to the Cannes Film Festival in France, 2013. The yearly Key Art Awards ceremony is often held at the Dolby Theatre in Hollywood. The Film Informant also recognizes movie marketing media and held the first annual TFI Awards in early January 2012. The site is the first to officially start recognizing and rating movie marketing media on a daily basis.

== See also ==
- Key art
- Golden Trailer Awards
- Re-cut trailer
- Snipe (theatrical)
- Stinger (post-credits scene)
- Teaser trailer
- Trailer music
