= Úyanga Bold =

Mongolian vocalist

Uyanga Boldbaatar, known professionally as Úyanga Bold and Éla Eko or Ella Ekko, is a vocalist from Mongolia, known for her work on cinema and video game soundtracks, including the 2020 film Mulan and Motherland: Fort Salem television series. She studied singing at Berklee College of Music and received a bachelor's degree in Vocal Performance.
