= Thomas Bergersen =

Norwegian composer, founder of Two Steps from Hell.

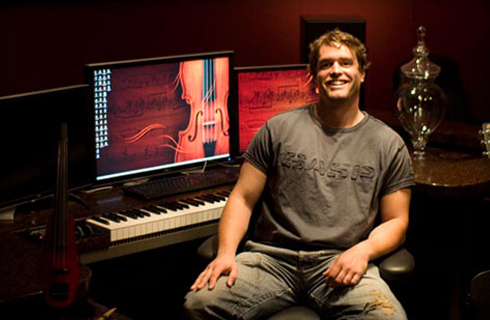

Background information
- Born: Thomas Jacob Bergersen; 4 July 1980 (age 46)
- Origin: Trondheim, Norway
- Occupation: Composer
- Instruments: Piano; keyboard; trumpet; violin; cello; guitar; duduk
- Years active: 2002–present
- Website: www.thomasbergersen.com

Thomas Jacob Bergersen (born 4 July 1980, Trondheim, Norway) is a Norwegian composer, multi-instrumentalist, and the co-founder of the production music company Two Steps From Hell. He is among the worlds most streamed artists in the classical crossover genre, with over 2 million streams per month on Spotify. Bergersen's compositions have featured in many famous movie series, such as Avatar, Pirates of the Caribbean, The Twilight Saga, The Chronicles of Narnia, Harry Potter, Da Vinci Code, The Mummy, The Dark Knight, and Tron: Legacy. His compositions have also been featured in many soundtracks and film trailers.

== Career ==
Bergersen is self-taught. He began playing piano at the age of 6 and started writing symphonic music in his teens.

He started his musical career as a demoscener, writing tracked modules under the name Lioz in the group Index. Bergersen worked with fellow Norwegian artist Boom Jinx on the 2007 trance single "Remember September".

In May 2010, Bergersen and his business partner, Nick Phoenix, released a debut public Epic Music Two Steps From Hell album titled Invincible. Several additional commercial album releases followed, including Archangel and SkyWorld. Bergersen also performed in a 2013 live concert at the Walt Disney Concert Hall. In 2010 Bergersen composed the original music for the movie The Human Experience. The Soundtrack CD was released on 29 March 2011.

Bergersen released a solo-produced soundtrack titled Illusions in 2011. His second solo album, Sun, was released in September 2014. He has also released several commercial singles since 2011, including "Heart" and "The Hero in Your Heart," which were intended to provide disaster relief in the wake of the Tōhoku earthquake and Typhoon Haiyan, respectively.

In March 2020, the album series Humanity was announced. Humanity is intended to be a seven-part set exploring all aspects of human emotion. On 1 July 2020, Humanity - Chapter I was released. Humanity - Chapter II was released on 11 November 2020, followed by Humanity - Chapter III. Humanity - Chapter IV was published on 2 September 2021, and on 21 April 2023 Humanity - Chapter V was released. On 28 July 2026, Humanity - Chapter VI was released.

Two Steps From Hell went on their first tour in 2022, performing with a live orchestra and choir at thirteen venues across Europe, and went on to release a live concert album that same year. They performed at the Wacken Open Air music festival in 2023, kicking off a second live tour. In 2025, Bergersen was invited to perform at the Mountbatten Festival of Music 2025 by the Bands of HM Royal Marines.

== Personal life ==
Bergersen was born and raised in Trondheim, Norway. He moved to the US in 2009 to pursue a musical career. Bergersen has stated that he moved from Los Angeles to Miami, and then to Seattle between 2010–2014 in the liner notes of his album Sun. The song "Cassandra" on the same album was inspired by his then-girlfriend. Bergersen considers himself a gamer and used to play games such as Duke Nukem 3D, Doom, Quake and Hitman: Absolution.

== Music ==
Bergersen stated that he has been influenced by musicians from many genres, such as Wolfgang Amadeus Mozart and Katy Perry. However, he stated that Gustav Mahler is among his primary influences. He dislikes the concept of music genres, which he thinks limit music to certain structures for the purpose of classification. For this reason he generally avoids following genres and industry conventions and follows his own intuition instead.

He draws inspiration from his personal emotions and events in romantic relationships, and anything "unique and beautiful" in his surroundings.

While Bergersen uses some publicly available sample libraries, most of his sounds are bespoke. He has sampled many orchestras, world instruments, and other sounds himself from all over the world, and those samples are available only to him. He uses Steinberg's Cubase to compose music. Besides electronic composing, many of his melodies originally come to life on his Grand piano.

== Discography ==
=== Solo ===
==== Studio albums ====
- Illusions (2011)
- Sun (2014)
- Humanity (2020–)
  - Chapter I (2020)
  - Chapter II (2020)
  - Chapter III (2021)
  - Chapter IV (2021)
  - Chapter V (2023)
  - Chapter VI (2026)

==== Symphonies ====
- American Dream (2018)
- Seven (2019)
- A Christmas Carol (2024)

=== Two Steps From Hell ===
==== Studio albums ====
- Invincible (2010)
- Archangel (2011)
- Halloween (2012)
- SkyWorld (2012)
- Classics Volume One (2013)
- Miracles (2014)
- Colin Frake on Fire Mountain (2014)
- Battlecry (2015)
- Classics Volume Two (2015)
- Vanquish (2016)
- Unleashed (2017)
- Dragon (2019)
- Myth (2022)

== Concerts ==
Date	
14 June 2013	produced by Two Steps From Hell, conductor Petr Pololáník @ Walt Disney Concert Hall, Los Angeles, USA
28 June 2014	produced and conducted by Ciprian Costin at Iași Palace of Culture, Romania (along Hans Zimmer's music)
27 April 2016	produced and conducted by Ciprian Costin at Bucharest Palace Hall, Romania (along Hans Zimmer's music)
20 April 2018	conducted by Petr Pololáník at Forum Karlín, Prague, Czech Republic performed by Film Music Prague orchestra, with Thomas Bergersen performing on his violin and on the piano
13 June 2022 - 2 July 2022	Two Steps from Hell Europe tour in Hof, Brussels, Amsterdam, London, Paris, Berlin, Prague, Vienna and Krakow Thomas Bergersen performing on piano, violin and drums
