= Trailer music =

Short piece of epic music, composed for film trailers

Trailer music (a subset of production music) is the background music used for film previews, which is not always from the film's soundtrack. The purpose of this music is to complement, support and integrate the sales messaging of the mini-movie that is a film trailer. Because the score for a movie is usually composed after the film is finished (which is long after trailers are released), a trailer will incorporate music from other sources. Sometimes music from other successful films or hit songs is used as a subconscious tie-in method. Trailer music is known for its sound-design driven and hybrid orchestral style. Trailer music tracks can vary greatly in duration, depending on the theme and target of the album. Some albums contains only sound-effects instead of actual music.

The music used in the trailer may be (or may have suggestive derivatives from):

- Music from the score of other movies. Many films have tracked their trailers with music from other campaigns, such as Scream (6 times), Die Hard, Beetlejuice (12 times), The Nightmare Before Christmas (7 times), MouseHunt (4 times), Stargate (22 times), Dragonheart (10 times), Gladiator (11 times), Requiem for a Dream (5 times), The Lord of the Rings: The Two Towers, Dragon: The Bruce Lee Story (13 times), Braveheart (9 times), Edward Scissorhands (7 times), Far and Away (6 times), Waterworld (12 times), Come See the Paradise (27 times), Aliens (24 times), Bram Stoker's Dracula (18 times), Backdraft (15 times), Glory (14 times), The Shawshank Redemption (14 times), The Fugitive (12 times), The Rocketeer (12 times), Rudy (12 times), Crimson Tide (11 times), The Matrix (11 times), T2: Judgement Day (10 times) and Drop Zone (5 times).
- Popular or well-known music, often chosen for its tone, appropriateness of a lyric, or familiarity.
- Classical music, such as Johann Strauss II The Blue Danube (The Waterboy), Mozart's Requiem (Cliffhanger), Beethoven's 9th symphony (Die Hard), or Carl Orff's Carmina Burana (Glory).
- Specially composed film trailer music. One of the most famous Hollywood film trailer music composers, credited with creating the musical voice of contemporary trailers, is John Everett Beal, who began scoring trailers in the 1970s and, in the course of a thirty-year career, created original music for over 2,000 movie trailer projects, including 40 of the top-grossing films of all time, such as Star Wars, Forrest Gump, Titanic, Aladdin, The Last Samurai and The Matrix. He is considered by the New York Times as the pioneer of original scores for film trailer music,
- Sound-design-focused and hybrid orchestral styles are typical of trailer music for films and games. Companies like BMG Production Music and composers like Inon Zur specialize in creating trailer music that can quickly captivate an audience.
- Songs, which may imitate recognizable (but often expensive to license) songs.
- "Library" music, which is previously composed production music. Trailer music library companies typically didn't offer their music to the public and developed and licensed music exclusively to the motion picture studios.

== Video Game Trailers ==
Developers often collaborate with composers or production companies to create original scores that reflect the game's atmosphere.

=== Notable Trailers Featuring Original Music ===
- Official Launch Trailer | Mortal Kombat 11 by international DJ, Dimitri Vegas & Like Mike together with 2WEI
- The Legend of Zelda: Breath of the Wild - E3 2016 Trailer by Manaka Kataoka
- Halo 3: "Finish the FIght" Trailer (2006) by Martin O'Donnell
- Metal Gear Solid V: The Phantom Pain | Gamescom Trailer
- Ferocious - Gameplay Trailer (2024) by DFAD
- Kingdom Come: Deliverance – Cinematic Trailer (2017) by Inon Zur
- Cyberpunk 2077 – E3 2018 Trailer by Marcin Przybyłowicz
- Final Fantasy VII Remake – E3 2015 Trailer by Nobuo Uematsu
- Mass Effect 3: Take Earth Back Cinematic Trailer (2012) by Clint Mansell
