= Skyblivion =

Upcoming fan remake

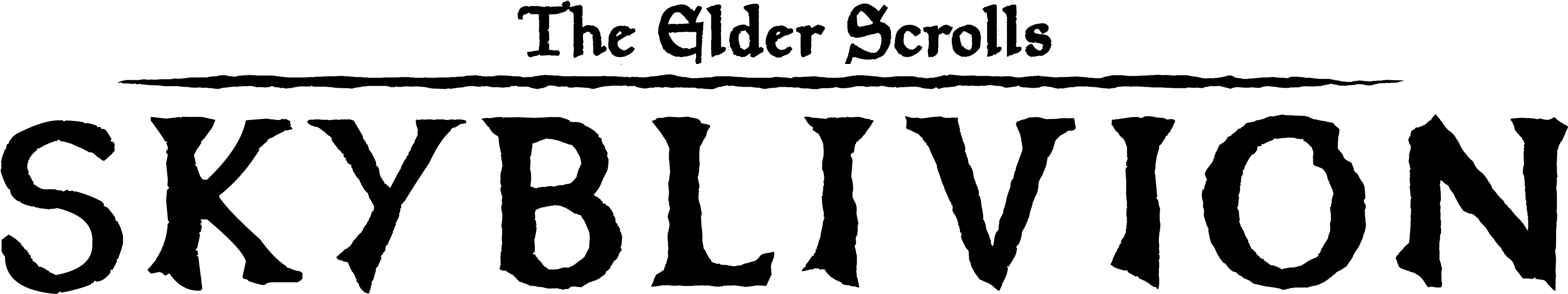
- Developer: TES Renewal Project
- Series: The Elder Scrolls
- Engine: Creation Engine
- Platform: Windows
- Release: 2026
- Genre: Action role-playing
- Mode: Single-player

Skyblivion is an upcoming action role-playing video game. It is a fan-made game remake of The Elder Scrolls IV: Oblivion (2006) developed through the Creation Engine of Bethesda Game Studios as a total conversion mod for The Elder Scrolls V: Skyrim (2011). It is scheduled to be released in 2026. The game development began around 2012 as part of The Elder Scrolls Renewal Project (also known as TES Renewal) and was initially intended to be a port before it was switched to a full remake by 2014. Pre-release reception has been positive.

Since 2016, the team released several trailers, including "Skyblivion – Return To Cyrodiil", "The Elder Scrolls: Skyblivion – Teaser Trailer", and "Official Release Year Announcement Trailer", the latest of which set a release date of 2025 which was later pushed back to 2026. In November 2016, the project lead Kyle Rebel (also known as Rebelzize) started to send out invites on Nexus Mods in the hope of attracting more volunteers. More people joined and the "Skyblivion – Return To Cyrodiil" trailer was published in December 2016, resulting in an influx of new volunteers. A Developer Map and Road Map series was released to show the game development.

== Background ==
Skyblivion is part of a fan volunteer effort by TES Renewal Project to recreate and remaster through total conversion the video games in The Elder Scrolls series. While TES Renewal Project is best known for Skywind, which seeks to recreate The Elder Scrolls III: Morrowind (2002) on The Elder Scrolls V: Skyrim – Special Edition (2016) engine, known as the Creation Engine, another volunteer team works separately on Skyblivion, a similar but separate project to remaster Oblivion on the more advanced Skyrim game engine. Skyblivion is a recreation of Oblivion within the engine for Skyrim – Special Edition.

In addition to re-creating what was previously in Oblivion and its downloadable content, the developers are improving and expanding upon elements of the original game. This includes the user interface, which is being done via a mixture of the SkyUI modification alongside bespoke Adobe Flash menus, as well as textures, environments, cities, dungeons, quests, characters, weapons, and clothing. They are also adding new content such as an expansion of the cities of Leyawiin and Anvil based on concept art from the original game, goblin tribes, and more music.

== Development ==
=== Early development as direct port ===
Like its sister project Skywind, which was in turn inspired by Morroblivion (a Morrowind remaster on the 2006 Oblivion engine), Skyblivion began by another volunteer team within the Renewal Project in 2012, and involves an overhaul of most aspects of the original game, including landscaping, weapons, and armors. In late 2012 or early 2013, Zilav (a modder and member of the Renewal Project) began a project to port Oblivion's assets into the Creation Engine, which was used to make Skyrim, the sequel of Oblivion. To do this, work was done on writing a tool to port the assets from Oblivion into the engine; however, technical limitations arose with the incompatibility of many files, resulting in broken or empty parts of the map, crashes, and bugs. The initial version of the project, 0.1, was released onto internet forums. In 2014, Zilav was joined by modder Monocleus, and they released a stable yet incomplete version of the project that would serve as the basis for further development. Rebelzize, the eventual project lead, retroactively called this build a "hot mess".

In May 2014, the project sought outside help from visual artists and declined voice actors, as Oblivion already featured a full voice cast. That same month, the team released version 0.2 of the project, which still required more help in areas such as visual asset creation, modeling, navmeshing, and voice acting. At this point, a selection of mods together could be used to play a portion of the project. After Rebelzize joined to help the project with its PR, he pitched the idea of remaking Oblivion rather than converting the game assets. The idea was approved. By November 2016, Rebelzize sought help from other modders to help with work on the project. He also did so through Nexus Mods, a site that allows users to upload and download mods. Rebelzize jokingly called it "the perfect pyramid scheme".

=== Later development as remake ===
With Rebelzize at the helm, Skyblivion's team began work to shift the focus towards a proper remake of Oblivion in Skyrim's engine. To release Skyblivion, Bethesda required the project to fully replace 100% of all assets from the original to not redistribute their own proprietary content. By 2018, Skyblivion as a remake was in full swing with multiple departments working on the project. Despite having the game's entire open world ported, they still had to hand remake the entire landscape of the game, which was largely procedurally generated in the original. Additionally, new improvements to the original game continued to be added as the project progressed. The cities of Leyawiin and Anvil were envisioned to follow early Oblivion concept art, all unique armors were redesigned to be truly unique, new musical scores were added to complement the originals, and new improvements were made throughout the game. By August 2019, the project started to near its completion, with the exterior map in its final stages of development, 3D computer graphics assets being implemented at a rapid rate, and debugging being done for the quests. In September 2020, the team launched the Developer Diary Series, showing the game development. By November 2021, the volunteer team had over 40 members, including individuals who work for large game studios as well as hobbyists. Rebelzize explained that their approach to development is similar to that of a AAA game.

In January 2023, the team announced that the game was scheduled to be released by 2025. In order to play Skyblivion when released, the players must legitimately own Oblivion, Skyrim, and all downloadable contents for both games. To access Skyblivion, it would have to be downloaded from Nexus, Steam Workshop, or Bethesda's mods store, then installed; afterwards, the player can launch Skyrim and create a new character to play Skyblivion. Due to its size, involving the open worlds of Morrowind, Cyrodiil, and Skyrim, the game would not be available to consoles; Skyblivion was planned to be playable in both Skyrim and Skyrim: Special Edition versions. Support for the original Skyrim version ended up getting dropped during development because of the graphical and performance limitations of the older game.

In order to complete the development of Skyblivion by its scheduled release date in 2025, the team was not able to launch it with all the downloadable content including The Shivering Isles. The team said that once Skyblivion is released, they would work on all downloadable content. Throughout 2023 and 2024, roadmap updates were given by the development team, with only one region left to remake by January 2025. In April 2025, Bethesda officially announced and released The Elder Scrolls IV: Oblivion Remastered. In response to concerns about fan-led project Skyblivion, Bethesda affirmed support for community efforts, and the Skyblivion team confirmed they would continue development. The entire Skyblivion team, which sent "all love and no hate" to Bethesda and Virtuos' official remaster, was gifted by Bethesda free keys to Oblivion Remastered. In September 2025, a former developer came forward to say that Skyblivion had become a crunch project in order to meet its announced release date. In December 2025, the release date was postponed to 2026.

== Marketing ==
=== Trailers ===
Several of the Skyblivion trailers received a significant amount of media coverage and also resulted in more support and volunteers. The team released a development trailer in May 2014 that showed the remaster in early development. This was followed in July 2015 by a 45-minute gameplay trailer. At that time, the game lacked navmesh, a mechanism by which non-player characters wander an environment without becoming lost in other assets. On December 9, 2016, Rebelzize uploaded a trailer titled "Skyblivion – Return To Cyrodiil". The trailer resulted in more support, willing volunteers, and an increase in recognition. This included more programmers and 3D artists. A new trailer, voice-acted and titled "The Elder Scrolls: Skyblivion – Teaser Trailer", was released on August 15, 2019. On January 15, 2023, the two-and-a-half-minute "Official Release Year Announcement Trailer" was uploaded to YouTube, where it was given a release date of 2025 "at the latest", or "at some point in 2025".

=== Developer Diary Series ===
In 2020, Skyblivion welcomed popular Skyrim YouTuber Heavy Burns to the team to support the production of regular video content updates to inform fans of the project's progress and to help recruit new volunteers. Heavy Burns then recruited English voice actor Ryan Cooper to lend his talents in narrating the new series. Shortly thereafter, Skyblivion's Developer Diary Series launched with the first video of the series posted to Rebelzize's YouTube channel on September 26, 2020. The launch of the new Developer Diary Series sparked a new era of growth and high recruitment for the project as the videos relatively high production value and professional presentation further cemented the project as one to be taken seriously. Since the initial release in 2020, an additional four Developer Diary episodes have been released garnering over 3,176,000 views on YouTube across the collection of videos. The series has been positively reviewed.

=== Road Map Series ===
As 2024 approached, one year from the targeted release year the Skyblivion team released "Oblivion Remastered Road to Release (Skyblivion Roadmap 2023)" on June 24, 2023, to transparently show the exact progress of the project and what further tasks needed to be completed before release. This video also offered another opportunity to drum up volunteers. On December 31, 2024, Rebelzize published an updated roadmap "The Path To Release (Skyblivion Roadmap 2024)" to showcase the final remaining tasks before releasing in the next year. Rebelzize also hosts livestreams on his channel, showing the development process of the game and answering questions from the viewers. The Road Map Series continues into 2025, further cementing the release window.

== Reception ==
=== Pre-release reception ===
The game has received positive responses leading up to the release, with critics calling the progress "impressive", "breathtaking", and "ambitious". By April 2022, Preston Pearl of Screen Rant said that the game "looks much better" compared to the original game. It received spots on PC Gamer's "8 most ambitious Skyrim mods in development in 2022" list, as well as number 8 on TheGamer's "Skyrim: Top 10 Anticipated Mods" list. It was awarded ModDB's "Best Upcoming Mod" in 2017. It was featured in the August 2023 issue of Bethesda's Monthly Modder highlighting "Rebelzize and the Skyblivion team are building a bridge between Cyrodiil and Tamriel". The pre-release remade 3E Cyrodiilic Steel Armor and Master Necromancer Robes were both featured in the May 2020 and August 2023 issues of Bethesda Featured Mods, respectively.

== See also ==
- Fan game
- Fan labor
- Enderal
- Skywind
- Skyrim modding
- User-generated content
