= The Forgotten City =

2021 video game

- Developer: Modern Storyteller
- Publisher: Dear Villagers
- Director: Nick Pearce
- Producer: Nick Pearce
- Designer: Nick Pearce
- Programmer: Alexander Goss
- Artist: John Eyre
- Writer: Nick Pearce
- Composer: Michael Allen
- Engine: Creation Engine (mod); Unreal Engine 4
- Platforms: Microsoft Windows; PlayStation 4; PlayStation 5; Xbox One; Xbox Series X; Nintendo Switch; Stadia
- Release: Original mod; 4 October 2015; Standalone game; 28 July 2021; Nintendo Switch; 23 September 2021; Stadia; 28 July 2022
- Genre: Adventure
- Mode: Single-player

The Forgotten City is a mystery adventure role-playing game developed by Australian developer Modern Storyteller and published by Dear Villagers with additional support from Film Victoria. It is a standalone adaptation of the 2015 The Forgotten City mod for The Elder Scrolls V: Skyrim. It was released in July 2021 for Microsoft Windows, PlayStation 4, PlayStation 5, Xbox One, and Xbox Series X/S. A cloud-based version launched in September 2021 for the Nintendo Switch.

== Gameplay ==
In both the 2021 game and the 2015 mod, the story of The Forgotten City explores the existential relationship between humanity and its laws. The full game begins with the protagonist waking after being rescued from floating down the Tiber River in Italy. The mysterious individual who rescues the player character asks them to look for her friend who had disappeared whilst investigating nearby ruins. As the player explores said ruins, they are sent back in time to 65 CE, with the ruins restored as a city of the Roman Empire. As the plot progresses and the player continues exploring, it is elaborated that the city is under the protection of the gods, where if anyone is to commit sin, all citizens of the city would be equally punished and turned into gold in a system referred to as the Golden Rule (originally Dwarves' Law).

These gold statues, depicting previous inhabitants and residents, can be heard whispering but seemingly only by the player. The specific sins that are criteria for the Golden Rule to be enacted are not clear to any resident of the city, with numerous records of contradictions. The player is able to re-enter the portal they had entered from and restart the time loop if the Golden Rule is ever enacted, allowing them to keep both physical and mental objects such as important items and information. The plot was significantly altered from its original story in the mod, with the setting of a Dwemer ruin being shifted towards that of ancient Rome as well as much of the script being updated and rewritten. Multiple endings were both added and expanded from the original story. Each character in the game has a strong background story and argument, complicating the decisions players make in the game. In the future, the developer plans to provide expansion through mods.

== Plot ==
The player character awakes after being rescued from floating down the Tiber by a young woman named Karen. She asks them to look for another saved individual, Al Worth, who had disappeared whilst investigating ancient Roman ruins of an underground city full of golden statues resembling ordinary people. The player discovers Al, who had committed suicide by hanging, with a note beside him remarking that the player ought to die rather than engage with a strange portal hidden in the ruins. The portal takes the player back in time to a living version of the city, where they meet a farmer named Galerius who takes them to the magistrate Sentius. Sentius explains that the city, which comprises less than two dozen people, is bound by a "Golden Rule" where if even one commits a sin, the whole city is doomed to be turned into golden statues, many of which are littered around the city from prior communities which failed to live up to the Golden Rule. Sentius, however, is aware that the Golden Rule will be broken later that day and has prepared a ritual to Proserpina to create a portal which takes the player back to the start of the day if the Golden Rule is broken. The only way for the player to escape is to create a time paradox, where if the Golden Rule is never broken, Sentius will have no reason to perform the ritual and the player will return to their own time.

The Forgotten City has four different endings. The first ending consists of shooting Sentius with either a pistol brought from the present or a golden bow with the capacity to turn anything it hits into gold. This creates a time paradox as Sentius is unable to complete the ritual, but the player and Al are trapped in the ruins of the city and ultimately perish. The second and third endings consist of discovering Sentius' lost daughter, Sentilla, locked in a cistern above the city, connected to a hidden aqueduct with the opportunity to escape. As escape would violate the Golden Rule, Sentius himself imprisoned Sentilla to prevent her escape. Upon freeing Sentilla, Sentius reveals that he preserved all his memories from each loop and did not intend for the protagonist to ever prevent the Golden Rule from being violated, commenting on how Al spent thousands of days trying to do so before ultimately committing suicide. Sentius' motivation, rather, is to use the ritual and the player's time loop as a way to attain immortality. Sentilla then sets Sentius on fire, violating the Golden Rule and causing a time paradox, before escaping: either alone in the second ending or with others from the community in the third ending. The player and Al then return to the present world of the living.

The fourth ending, referred to by the game as the "Canon Ending," requires the player to discuss how various individuals came to arrive at the community with the Vestal Virgin Equitea. Here, the player learns that they are actually in the Underworld: the river at the start of the game was not the Tiber but the Styx, and Karen's name was merely a different pronunciation of the ferryman Charon. Equitea tasks the player with collecting four plaques necessary to unlock the Grand Temple at the top of the community. These four plaques represent four communities from the history of the city—Romans, Greeks, Egyptians, and Sumerians—who gradually built cities on top of each other that hid the existence of the prior cultures.

Upon unlocking the Grand Temple, the player meets Pluto, a member of a superintelligent alien race who arrived thousands of years ago to guide humanity and were deemed to be gods due to their advanced technology. Most of the aliens deemed humanity to be naturally violent and sinful, electing to return to their utopian homeworld. Another alien, Proserpina, saw potential in mankind and turned herself human, leading Pluto to leave her in suspension. Proserpina's father, Jupiter, forbid her from returning as no human was permitted to go to their homeworld. In response, Pluto made a wager with Jupiter that humans were capable of living for a full year without sin, leading to the creation of the city and the Golden Rule itself. Pluto minted one thousand silver coins which would bring those who held them in death to come to the city in the afterlife. The community the player finds themself in is the last one that could possibly succeed, as there are only two coins remaining by the Romans' time: those which would be later discovered by Al and the player, causing both of them to arrive at the city.

The protagonist succeeds in either convincing Pluto that the Golden Rule's enforcement leads to sin itself, or intimidating him using the golden bow, ultimately leading to the suspension of the rule and the creation of a time paradox. Pluto sends all members of the community, as well as Al and the player, back to the land of the living, but to the present rather than during the time of the Romans. The only exception is Sentius, who is left as the sole golden statue in the sealed-off underground city for his crimes. The epilogue consists of the player meeting all living individuals from the city in a present-day museum, as well as Proserpina, who had been the voice in the statues whispering to the player throughout the game. The game ends by revealing that all the statues, not just the people alive during the final city, had been brought back to mortal form and transported to the present.

== Development ==
The long development progress of The Forgotten City, spearheaded by lead developer and writer Nick Pearce, began from the beginning of Skyrim's release in 2011. Prior to this, Pearce has stated that his inspiration for creating mods came back from his experience with mods from Fallout: New Vegas, specifically New Vegas Bounties by Someguy2000. The Forgotten City took over 1700 hours for Pearce to develop, and was his first ever major development project. While the mod relied on the Creation Engine of Skyrim, the Unreal Engine 4 was used for the standalone title. The mod was released in October 2015. The mod was also published on console releases of the Skyrim: Special Edition, remaining one of the top Xbox One mods for the game. A cloud-based version for the Nintendo Switch was also developed and released in September 2021.

In 2016, after the release of the mod, Pearce quit his day job and hired several other developers to form Modern Storyteller. The resulting development process took four and a half years, characterised by harsh development conditions, with Pearce working 80-hour weeks to the point of hallucination to avoid crunching fellow developers. In the process, the original mod was entirely overhauled; the standalone game was developed using Unreal Engine 4, the setting was changed and numerous features were added, such as professional voice acting, new gameplay mechanics and an original orchestral score. Additionally, the original script doubled in length from roughly 35,000 words to over 80,000.

== Reception ==
Reception

Aggregate score
Aggregator	Score
Metacritic	PC: 84/100; PS5: 85/100; XONE: 88/100; XSX: 86/100; NS: 90/100

Review scores
Publication	Score
Adventure Gamers	5/5
Eurogamer	Recommended
Game Informer	9/10
GameSpot	9/10
IGN	9/10
Nintendo Life	9/10
Nintendo World Report	9/10
PC Gamer (US)	84/100
Push Square	7/10
RPGFan	90/100
The Guardian	4/5
TouchArcade	4.5/5

Both the mod and the full video game received critical acclaim upon release, itself being one of the first video game mods to receive any official accolades outside of the modding community, specifically being awarded by the Australian Writers' Guild. The mod had garnered large success within the modding community, remaining one of the top mods for the game and becoming one of the most curated items on Mod DB itself.

IGN awarded the game a 9/10 stating: "The Forgotten City does a fabulous job exploring interesting moral quandaries through excellently written dialogue and characters." Luke Holland of The Guardian gave it 4/5 stars, writing that despite minor technical issues, "The Forgotten City is a tremendous achievement, a labyrinthine little sandbox packed with interpersonal mysteries", which "unravel further and further with each pass." TouchArcade liked the characters and themes of the title, saying "The game has a lot of points to make about morality, and it never feels like it's preaching. Rather, it comes off like a thoughtful examination of assumptions". While mentioning that it could be "janky" at moments, Nintendo Life praised the pacing of The Forgotten City, saying it "doesn't overstay its welcome" and it had "the right amount of scope".

Rock Paper Shotgun enjoyed the writing but criticized how the player talked to characters, "when you go up to someone to interact, it then cuts to a view of their upper body, with a pause while they turn to face you or settle into their talking pose. It's only a couple of seconds, but it's a couple of seconds every. Single. Time." GameSpot liked the progression the player had within the loop, writing, "It's satisfying the first time you find these solutions, but even more so when you see how each one acts as a piece of the larger puzzle, opening new avenues for you to investigate in the process." Eurogamer praised the connections each individual mystery had to each other, and stated, "The time loop itself leads to some wonderful stuff, though, linking itself into puzzles in ingenious ways," PC Gamer liked the way the player could bend the game's morality system but criticized the combat as clunky and uninteresting, saying there was a "sequence where I had to skulk through a ruined palace filled with creepy animated statues ... It was chilling at first, but those weird statues running towards me over and over quickly got repetitive."

Push Square wrote similarly and gave the game 7/10 stars, concluding, "With the interesting time loop mechanic creating further situations full of comedy and intrigue, settling down across a few evenings with The Forgotten City will delight. We just wish the combat was either improved or not there at all, and the technical setbacks weren't quite so rampant." Game Informer felt that "The Forgotten City does a great job making you feel like a skillful sleuth, pushing you to run across town with sizzling leads", whilst criticizing how the janky character movements and facial expressions prevented the player from being able to deduce vital information. Adventure Gamers gave the title 5/5 stars, and called it "a truly excellent mystery adventure", writing, "[The Forgotten City] gives you the freedom to investigate, explore and make choices on your own terms, while the quality of the script will have you fully invested in getting to the bottom of the Golden Rule breaker", although it criticized the overabundance of backtracking.

=== Accolades ===
Year	Award	Category	Nominee(s)	Result	Ref.
2015	Skyrim Nexus	File of the Month, October	The Forgotten City	Won	
2015	Mod DB	Mod of the Year	The Forgotten City	Nominated	
2016	Australian Writers' Guild	Best Interactive Media	Nick Pearce for The Forgotten City	Won	
2021	Australian Game Developer Awards	Excellence in Narrative	The Forgotten City	Won	
2021	The Game Awards	Best Debut Indie	The Forgotten City	Nominated	
2022	25th Annual D.I.C.E. Awards	Outstanding Achievement in Story	The Forgotten City	Nominated	

== See also ==
- Skyrim modding
