= Skyrim modding =

User-generated creations for the 2011 video game Skyrim

Skyrim modding is the act of modifying The Elder Scrolls V: Skyrim (2011), a fantasy role-playing video game. In the aftermath of the game's launch, a dedicated community for developing mods emerged. These mods range from utilities and bug fixes to new content and total conversions, which use the Skyrim engine as a foundation for original titles. It is common for players to mod Skyrim even prior to their first playthrough. As one of the most modded games of all time, Skyrim has over 70,000 mod submissions on Nexus Mods and 28,000 in the Steam Workshop.

In addition to the free community driven mods, Bethesda also offered paid mods through Creation Club for a period in the late 2010s. These were ultimately packaged into the 2021 Anniversary Edition; the system was replaced by "Creations" from 2023.

== History ==
Earlier titles in The Elder Scrolls had significant modding communities long before Skyrim's release. Among the most notable of these were Tamriel Rebuilt, which sought to expand Morrowind to include the province's mainland, and the total conversion mod for Oblivion, Nehrim: At Fate's Edge (2010). Individual modders sometimes transitioned into the newer games as they became available, as was the case with Vilja creator Emma Amgepo Lycanthrops who started modding Morrowind and moved through Oblivion to Skyrim.

=== "Oldrim" and early mods (2011-2016) ===
Skyrim modding began shortly after launch. The initial release of the game is generally referred to as "Oldrim" by the modding community, to distinguish it from the various re-releases. The early Skyrim mods were smaller in scope, focusing on gameplay tweaks rather than the introduction of new content on a large scale.

As the modding community matured, some tooling was developed to assist with modding. Bethesda released their Creation Kit for public use in 2012, which originated as a piece of tooling in development of the game itself. Some mechanical or technical mods also became infrastructural to the wider ecosystem. A notable community developed tool was the Skyrim Script Extender (SKSE), which expands the utility of Papyrus scripts. It swiftly became a prerequisite for many mods. The modder Arthmoor drew controversy by introducing content-related revisions to his widely used mechanical mods. This included Open Cities (used to remove loading screens when entering cities) being updated to include ruined gates leftover from the Oblivion Crisis. His changes led to a "war" between modders attempting to patch the gates out; as Open Cities was a prerequisite for other unrelated mods.

By the mid 2010s, Skyrim had become a "modders paradise", with many large scale mods in development. Among the most well known of these was the narrative based mod The Forgotten City (2015), which won the Australian Writers' Guild award that year- the first mod to have ever done so. Bethesda occasionally sought out modders to hire as formal developers. The prominent modder Emmi Junkkari was hired in this manner.

=== Re-releases and expansion to other platforms (2016-2021) ===
The modding community was affected by the various re-releases of Skyrim. The 2016 Special Edition was praised for allowing PlayStation 4 and Xbox One players to download mods; previously this had been primarily a venture for PC players. When Skyrim was released for the Nintendo Switch in 2017, Bethesda said that it had no plans to support mods, although expressing their wish to see it happen. Despite this, unofficial Skyrim mods were made through the Skyrim NX Modding Hub. The developer of the hub, Doodlez, was interviewed by Eurogamer and stated that he wanted to overcome the "shady" connotations of modding and "build a bridge" between the console and PC modding communities.

By 2020, modding was considered "a fundamental part" of the game for players, with the modification and tinkering of the game viewed as a hobby in its own right. For some, modding was a way of addressing the age of the game, with the language of RPGs having evolved greatly in the decade since launch.

The arrival of the Anniversary Edition in 2021 brought with it fears of a "modpocalypse"- namely that the new edition would break older mods. After the modder extrwi raised the issue, Bethesda presented them with early access to a build of the edition, so that a fix could be developed. As a result the modpocalypse was largely averted. The Anniversary Edition retained console support for mods, bringing the game to Playstation 5 and Xbox Series X and Series S.

=== Nexus deletion policy controversy ===
In 2021, Nexus Mods stated that they would no longer allow older mods to be removed from their website, following a 30-day grace period, in order to prevent problems with the Collections feature, which allows for batch downloading of mods. This caused a backlash which led to many modders leaving Nexus Mods for other sites prior to the grace period ending. Arthmoor moved several of his popular mods to the independently-owned site AFK Mods instead, arguing that a modder had a legal right to delete their content.

== Total conversion mods ==
These are mods that totally alter the underlying game- essentially using it as a foundation for another title.

- Enderal: The Shards of Order (2016), a sequel to the Oblivion mod Nehrim: At Fate's Edge (2010) that was an early example of total conversion. It contains a darker story than Skyrim and was positively received by fans.
- Vampire the Masquerade Reawakened (TBA), a mod which originated as an attempt to remake Vampire: The Masquerade - Redemption (2000) in the Skyrim engine. The team reached out to the rights holders in 2024- in this case Paradox Interactive for the Vampire: The Masquerade IP, and Activision for the rights to Redemption. Paradox granted the license, but Activision did not- as a result the mod will be an officially licensed Vampire: The Masquerade game which is inspired by Redemption, but will not be a direct remake.

=== The Elder Scrolls Renewal Project ===
A group of modders collectively known as The Elder Scrolls Renewal Project began an effort to remake older Elder Scrolls titles in the Skyrim engine. While they share a banner, the two projects are developed by independent teams, though they have collaborated with one another. Both projects are still in active development.

- Skywind (TBA) seeks to remake Morrowind. It originated with developers of Morroblivion, who ported Morrowind into the Oblivion engine in the 2000s. Skywind is however a full remake rather than a simple port; it has been in development since 2012. The initial release will not include the original game's expansion content, but this is planned for later. As of 2026, some aspects are close to completion, including writing, voice acting and art, but the game's sound design and voice mastering lag behind the other departments.
- Skyblivion (TBA) seeks to remake Oblivion. It originated in an early 2010s effort to develop a simple port, but the project expanded into a full remake. Bethesda released an official remake in 2025 as Oblivion Remastered but affirmed support for community efforts, and the Skyblivion team confirmed they would continue development. The entire Skyblivion team, which sent "all love and no hate" to Bethesda and Virtuos' official remaster, was gifted by Bethesda free keys to Oblivion Remastered. Skyblivion is aiming for release later in 2026, having begun a "final marketing push" in September.

== Content based mods ==
These are mods that add new content- such as quests and new explorable areas.

- Vilja (2012) a port of a mod originally made for Oblivion. It adds a follower named Vilja, with dialogue partially written by Terry Pratchett.
- Falskaar (2013) contains a DLC-length adventure with 26 new quests in a new continent, and was created as a job application; its creator was later hired by Bungie.
- The Forgotten City (2015), a narrative-focused adventure created by Nick Pearce that was awarded by the Australian Writers' Guild. It was expanded and remade as a standalone game in 2021. The final version of the game, developed by a team of three people at Modern Storyteller and published by Dear Villagers, uses the Unreal Engine 4 and was released for Microsoft Windows and Nintendo Switch.
- Elianora's Breezehome Overhaul (2016) greatly revises the Breezehome location in Whiterun. The mod was highly popular, drawing millions of downloads. Elianora (Emmi Junkkari) was hired by Bethesda to work on Starfield afterwards.
- Lordbound (2025) is a large mod sometimes referred to as an expansion in reference to its scale. It adds 60 hours of gameplay, and a new region larger than Solstheim with 50 dungeons. It was in development for a decade.

=== Beyond Skyrim ===
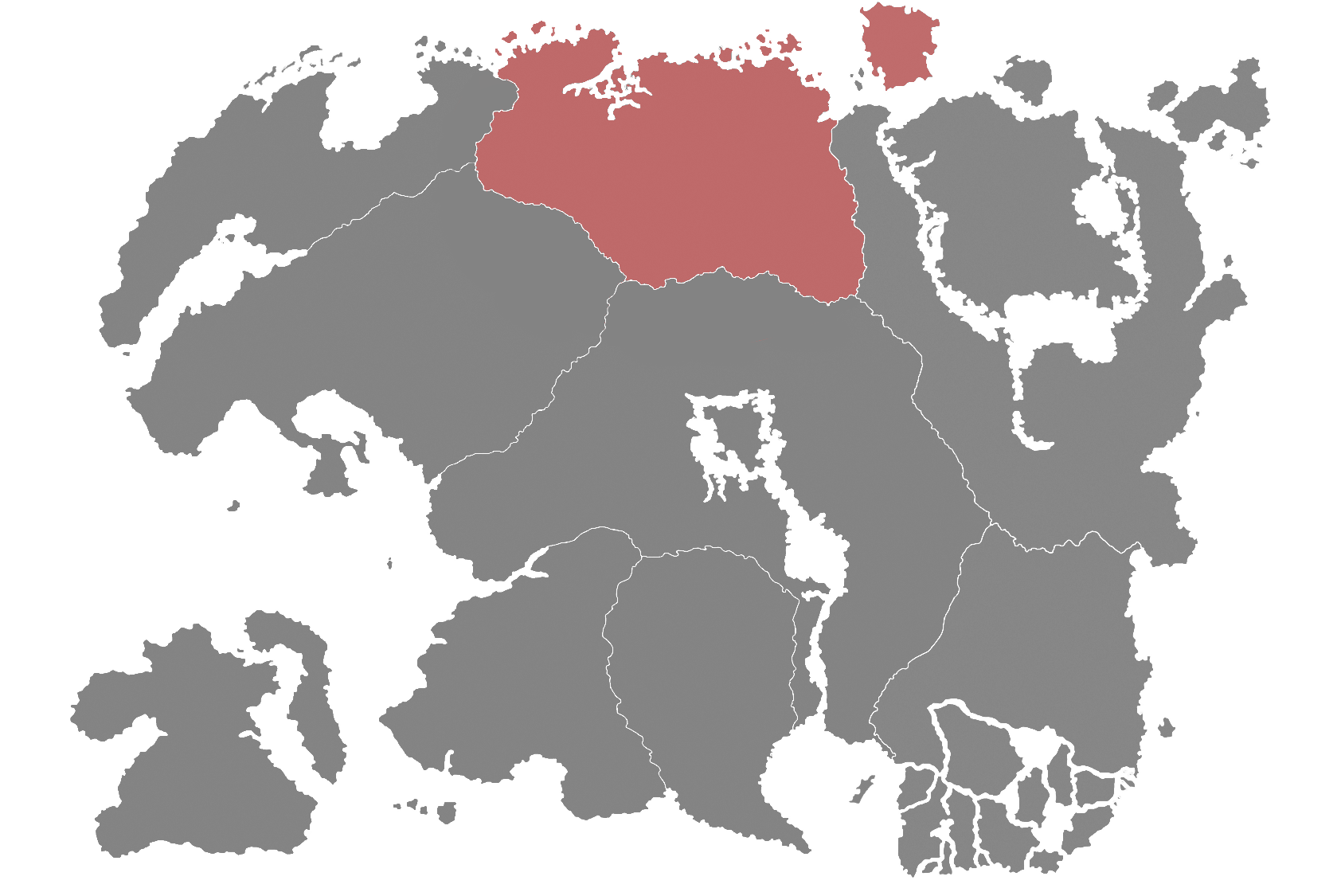
The continent of Tamriel, with Skyrim (Note: plus the island of Solstheim, which is accessible in the Dragonborn DLC) highlighted. Beyond Skyrim aims to make the remainder of the continent accessible.

Beyond Skyrim is a mod project which intends to add the entire continent of Tamriel to the game. Given the size and amount of content required, the continent is subdivided into its provinces which will launch individually as discrete, concurrently developed mods. As of 2026 no province has released in full- though some content has been made available through smaller scale pre-release mods. The eight main mods are:

- Argonia (TBA)
- Cyrodiil (TBA) reportedly includes more voice lines than the base game. The pre-release for this province, Bruma launched in 2017. It was expanded in 2026 to cover a larger area and include more content, while work on the wider province continues.
- Elsweyr (TBA)
- Expedition to Atmora (TBA)
- Iliac Bay (TBA) covers the High Rock and Hammerfell regions.
- Morrowind (TBA) is one of the more prominent projects from the team; some assets have released via the Bonemold Weapon Pack, which launched for the 20th anniversary of Morrowind in 2022.
- Roscrea (TBA) is "nearing the final stages of development" as of 2025, adapting the cold island in the remote north. A small pre-release, The Lost Roscrean Blade was made available in 2020.
- Valenwood (TBA)

=== Paarthurnax mods ===
These mods seek to address dissatisfaction over the lack of a choice to spare Paarthurnax despite his prominent role in aiding the Dragonborn.

- The Paarthurnax Dilemma (2016) added the option to force Delphine to stand down.
- Paarthurnax – Quest Expansion (2021) used existing lines to expand that quest and make it sensible from both the Blades' and Paarthurnax's point of view, as well as add the option to spare the dragon.

=== Comedic/ parody mods ===
- Fall of the Space Core (2012), a mod made by Valve to celebrate the launch of Steam Workshop support for Skyrim. It is a Portal crossover, with Nolan North reprising his role as the Space Core.
- Really Useful Dragons (2013), a mod which replaced all dragons with Thomas the Tank Engine characters. The mod went viral and influenced later mods for Fallout 4, Silent Hill 2, Elden Ring and many others. The creator indicated he had received legal threats from Mattel.
- Give Me Money For No Reason (2015) introduces the NPC Beth the Beggar, a parody of Bethesda. Made in protest at attempts to introduce paid mods at the time.
- Kallax Storageborn (2026), a promotional mod made by IKEA that features a sentient shelving unit voiced by Matt Berry. The shelf is summoned with the new shout "IKEA!" Critics found the mod surprisingly extensive with a full questline for the shelf and a lot of voice lines from Berry.

== Utilities and mechanical tweaks ==
These mods are more subtle, offering quality of life or gameplay alterations.

- SkyUI (2011) completely redesigns the game's menu screen to make it easier to use, as well as providing menu systems for other mods, is also a popular and highly recommended mod.
- A Quality World Map (2011) improves the map screen and adds hand drawn roads.
- The Unofficial Skyrim Patch (2011), which simply address "a huge amount of bugs the official patches don't". One exists for both the main game and the official High Resolution textures patch.
- Insects Begone (2012), a mod for players with arachnophobia which allows the complete replacement of spiders and chaurus with bears. It can also alter some environmental assets such as spider egg sacs to this end.
- Realistic Humanoid Movement Speed (2013), which adjusts the player's movement speed to make walking faster and running slower.

=== Adult content ===
Skyrim is noted to have an active adult modding scene centered around the website LoversLab, which boasts around 1.5 million members. Its owner, Ashal, created a mod template for the game known as SexLab that enabled the creation of adult-themed mods by providing a "foundation of thousands of animations and basic game functions". While largely within the bounds of typical erotica, the mods also include numerous kinks, such as BDSM, with some containing a meaningful story. Many of these modders remain anonymous, as "expressing sexuality in public or in the media beyond holding hands and kisses" remains largely taboo. The site's loose policies also allow controversial and disturbing content, although mods containing pedophilia are strictly banned.

== Paid mods ==
Skyrim mods are by and large provided for free, being community endeavors. However, there have been several drives to create an ecosystem of "paid mods".

In 2015, Valve Corporation announced a paid mods feature for Steam, with particular emphasis being placed on Skyrim mods. This led to significant backlash, as well as a petition that gained more than 130,000 signatures. Parodic Skyrim mods were even created to protest the decision, such as Beth the Beggar, a character that would ask money to the player. A week later, Valve reversed the decision, stating that "stepping into an established, years old modding community in Skyrim was probably not the right place to start iterating".

In 2017, Bethesda announced the Creation Club, a storefront for Fallout 4 and Skyrim in which players paid for new content, some of which was created by fans who were compensated by Bethesda for their work. This was compared by some critics to "paid mods", although Bethesda did not characterize them as such to avoid backlash. Skyrim: Anniversary Edition was released in November 2021, containing all 48 previously released Creation Club items as well as 26 new Creation Club items. In December 2023, Bethesda replaced Creation Club with Creations, which added new paid and free mods.

== Legacy ==
The Skyrim modding scene served as a means for many to begin careers in game development. A number of prominent modders went on to work full time in the games industry, including Emmi Junkkari (Bethesda), David Pearce (Bethesda) and Alexander J. Velicky (Bungie). The modding community Beyond Skyrim operates a teaching group called the Arcane University, through which volunteers host lectures and conduct game development training for free.

== See also ==
- Fan game
- Fan labor
- User-generated content
