= Mark Nelson (video game designer) =

American video game designer

Mark Nelson is an American video game designer and humor writer best known for his work with Bethesda Game Studios and the game series The Elder Scrolls. In March 2007, he joined computer games company Big Huge Games to create a new role-playing game, joining industry veteran Brian Reynolds and long-time collaborator Ken Rolston.

From 2014 to 2016, Nelson served as design director at robotics company Sphero. While there, he was responsible for the design of the successful BB-8 app-controlled droid released in 2015.

In July 2017, Nelson was named Chief R&D and Design Officer of Bit Fry Game Studios, Inc.

== Early career ==
Before entering the computer game field, Mark spent many years as both a writer and editor. He designed multimedia training for Raytheon, edited environmental impact statements for the United States Department of Energy, and was an editor of The Washington Wit, a Washington, DC–based humor magazine.

== Videogame industry ==
Nelson joined Bethesda Game Studios as a designer on The Elder Scrolls III: Morrowind. He then led the design on its expansions, The Elder Scrolls III: Tribunal and The Elder Scrolls III: Bloodmoon. Nelson went on to work as a designer on award-winning games The Elder Scrolls IV: Oblivion, and Fallout 3. He was the lead designer on 2007's The Elder Scrolls IV: Shivering Isles. In 2007 he joined Big Huge Games as lead narrative designer on their RPG project, cancelled when the studio was sold in 2009.

Nelson went on to be the lead designer and creative director of Kingdoms of Amalur: Reckoning, a single player RPG designed by Big Huge Games, a Baltimore subsidiary of 38 Studios. The game was created for the Xbox 360, PS3 and PC platforms and is set in the world of Amalur.

In July 2007, Nelson became the design director for Zynga East, a Baltimore-based social game studio, which produced the titles FrontierVille and CityVille 2.

In February 2013, Nelson left Zynga when the Zynga East studio was shut down.

== Games ==
- CityVille 2 (2012) (design director)
- Kingdoms of Amalur: Reckoning (2011) (creative director, lead designer)
- Fallout 3 (2008) (designer)
- The Elder Scrolls IV: Shivering Isles (2007) (lead designer)
- The Elder Scrolls IV: Oblivion (2006) (designer)
- Pirates of the Caribbean (2003) (additional design)
- The Elder Scrolls III: Bloodmoon (2003) (writer, designer)
- The Elder Scrolls III: Tribunal (2002) (writer, designer)
- The Elder Scrolls III: Morrowind (2002) (writer, designer)
