= Skywind =

Upcoming non-commercial fan-made mod for The Elder Scrolls V: Skyrim

- Developer: TES Renewal Project
- Series: The Elder Scrolls
- Engine: Creation Engine
- Platform: Windows
- Release: TBA
- Genre: Action role-playing
- Mode: Single-player

Skywind is an upcoming non-commercial fan-made total conversion mod for The Elder Scrolls V: Skyrim (2011), which aims to faithfully recreate the world of The Elder Scrolls III: Morrowind (2002) in the Creation Engine. It features improved smithing, crafting, and combat systems, along with numerous other Skyrim mechanics and features integrated into the Morrowind setting. In order to run Skywind, ownership of both Skyrim: Special Edition and Morrowind (likely the Game of the Year Edition) is required. As of 2026, the mod is still in development.

Skywind began development in 2012 as part of The Elder Scrolls Renewal Project (also known as TES Renewal). Earlier, a mod was being developed as a porting of Morrowind into the Oblivion engine as part of the Morroblivion project, which inspired Skywind. While the characters of Morrowind shared only a few voice actors, Skywind will contain voice acting for the majority of in-game characters. Pre-release reception has been positive.

== Background ==
Skywind is part of a fan volunteer effort by TES Renewal Project to recreate and remaster the video games in The Elder Scrolls series through total conversion, and has been officially approved by the publisher Bethesda Softworks. This began with Morroblivion, a Morrowind remake on The Elder Scrolls IV: Oblivion (2006) engine, prior to Skyrim's release. The mod was publicly available on the team's website in 2008, and was coordinated through the Morroblivion website's forums.

In 2012, after the release of Skyrim, forum members began work on Skywind, intending to begin the same result of Morroblivion but in the Skyrim engine. That same year, Skywind inspired other modders within the Renewal Project to attempt porting Oblivion's assets into the Creation Engine, starting the development of what became Skyblivion. Skywind is a recreation of Morrowind (2002) in the Skyrim – Special Edition (2016) game engine. All original game assets, including textures, music, quests, and gameplay, were planned to be redesigned.

== Development ==
The development of Skywind began in 2012, roughly one year after Skyrim and its various downloadable contents and add-ons (Dawnguard, Hearthfire, and Dragonborn) were released. Much like its predecessor Morroblivion, Skywind began life as a fan-made port of Morrowind, meant to be playable in Skyrim's engine with Skyrim's mechanics. The project began with about eight modders, and the team expanded by January 2014 to 70 volunteers. Since then, the team came to involve over 70 volunteers in artist, composer, designer, developer, and voice acting roles who released several videos highlighting their development progress. On January 4, 2014, the team released on YouTube their first development video.

In September 2012, the first videos and screenshots of an early version of a Skywind mod to port Morrowind into the Skyrim engine were released. That same month, while the team was still struggling with buggy files, it was suggested that they take Skywind in a different direction. Rather than use Morrowind assets, as had been the case with Morroblivion, they should instead focus on remaking or replacing everything: new models, new textures, new voices, music, and landscaping. This was a mammoth undertaking compared to the creation of a simple port. As the scope of Skywind expanded, so did the need for talented individuals to turn the ambitious plans into a reality. The project attracted professionals, aspiring professionals, and amateurs alike, and standards continually rose until Skywind's quality could compete with other AAA productions. The creators stated on July 6, 2014, that the alpha version (an unfinished test version) was "nearing its first public release". That summer, an alpha version was released for download. It was later taken down due to the large number of questions about unfinished content saturating the forums; the game's first public alpha was soon withdrawn also due to its "very alpha state".

In November 2014, the team reported to have finished half of the remaster's environment, over 10,000 new dialogue lines, and three hours of series-inspired soundtrack. Players were able to download and play an unfinished version of the release until late 2014, when the volunteer team chose to divert assets to development instead of user support. A March 2015 update showed updated levels. The developers wrote that they were not close to a release despite technical indications from their project's software versioning. In September 2015, it was observed that the game had recruited more voice actors than Skyrim itself (over 100) to re-record the game's lines. In March 2016, the project team released its fourth update, which was designed to solicit volunteers for the remaining work. In October 2018, a further major trailer was released, and another in July 2019 and January 2020.

In 2021, the game marked the milestone of 100 completed dungeons. In May 2023, the 21st anniversary of Morrowind's release, the Skywind team released a 21-minute video of gameplay footage. In the video, the narrator stated that the team was "finalizing major game elements". By May 2024, after nearly thirteen years of development, level design was estimated to be 70 percent complete, while voice acting was 80 percent done, with nearly all the quests written. Additionally, in contrast to the base game of Skyrim and its about 1,100 non-playable characters voiced by 70 actors, Skywind has over 3,000 different characters voiced by around 300 performers, three times as many as Skyrim; the significant amount of work required to rebuild Morrowind, itself a very large world despite its age, explains the long development. As of January 2025, the mod is still in development.

== Reception ==
=== Pre-release reception ===
In 2014, Nathan Grayson of Rock Paper Shotgun praised the trailer of mod's first areas as "incredibly nostalgia-provoking", describing the visuals as "splendid" but saying that he was "impressed yet skeptical", citing the lack of gameplay shown; he added that he was "very, very hopeful for Skywind's continued progress". Also in 2014, PC Games said the 0.9 version of Skywind looks "absolutely professional" and even in its unfinished form the playable elements leave "an excellent impression". In 2023, Christopher Livingston of PC Gamer stated that Skywind's latest trailer, about the quest "Necromancer in Mawia", looked "fantastic", and described the world as "beautifully recreated", citing the mod's faithfulness to the original game. In 2024, Rory Norris of PCGamesN described it as "the most ambitious mod on the way for Bethesda's nearly 14-year-old RPG" and said "it would be hard to argue against Skywind being one of the best Skyrim mods of all time".

== See also ==
- Fan game
- Fan labor
- Enderal
- Skyrim modding
- Skyblivion
- User-generated content
