= Lietzau =

Lietzau is a German surname. Notable people with the surname include:

- Hans Lietzau (1913–1991), German theatre director, actor, and producer
- Nicolas Samuel Lietzau (born 1991), German video game writer
- William K. Lietzau (fl. 1983), American lawyer and government official
