= The Elder Scrolls III: Tribunal =

- Developer: Bethesda Game Studios
- Publisher: Bethesda Softworks
- Producer: Ashley Cheng
- Designer: Ken Rolston
- Programmer: Craig Walton
- Artists: Matthew Carofano; Christiane Meister
- Writers: Gavin Carter; Brian Chapin; Mark E. Nelson
- Series: The Elder Scrolls
- Engine: Gamebryo
- Platforms: Microsoft Windows; Xbox (GOTY Edition)
- Release: NA: November 8, 2002; UK: November 29, 2002
- Genre: Action role-playing
- Mode: Single-player

The Elder Scrolls III: Tribunal is an expansion for the role-playing video game The Elder Scrolls III: Morrowind by Bethesda Softworks, released in November 2002. The first of two expansions released for Morrowind, Tribunal is set in Mournhold, the capital of the province of Morrowind, and a self-contained city disconnected from the original game. The central quests task the player to resolve the tensions between the King of Morrowind, Hlaalu Helseth, and the Living God Almalexia. The expansion includes quality of life additions, including alterations to the game's quest journal and map.

Developed following the release of Morrowind, Tribunal was based on earlier concepts and settings in The Elder Scrolls series. The developers aimed to create a self-contained experience that explored the characters and mythology of the 'Living Gods' of the Tribunal, a key element of the narrative in the original game. Upon release, Tribunal received positive reviews, with praise for its gameplay improvements, greater difficulty, and setting, and criticism directed to the linear and short nature of the expansion and ongoing technical issues with the game. The reception of Tribunal influenced the game's second expansion, The Elder Scrolls III: Bloodmoon, released in 2003.

== Gameplay ==
Sortable entries in the player journal were cited by reviewers as an important quality of life addition to Morrowind.

Gameplay in Tribunal is identical to Morrowind, with the game functioning as an extension of quests and open-ended locations to explore. The main addition to Tribunal is the inclusion of a city, Mournhold. Mournhold is not a contiguous part of the game world in Morrowind, and players are required to access the area through a teleportation service, with certain features such as levitation disabled to conceal the city's separation from the game world. Access to the content in Tribunal is possible after the player first goes to sleep, which will trigger the initial quest leading the player to a service that can teleport them to Mournhold.

Tribunal features several minor quality of life gameplay additions, including the modification of the game's quest journal system. In the original game, the journal records entries in linear chronological order, which can become lengthy and cumbersome as the game progresses. Tribunal introduces changes to the journal interface allowing a player to sort their journal by quest name and distinguish between active and completed quests. Other interface additions include the ability to annotate the game's map. The expansion introduces hireable followers who can travel with the player. This includes a mercenary who can use weapons and armor provided by the player, so long as they are paid a regular fee. The player can hire a pack rat who can carry items from the player's inventory. In addition, the Museum of Artifacts provides the player with an avenue to sell high-value items obtained in the original game.

== Plot ==
The player is attacked by an assassin, later revealed to be a member of the Dark Brotherhood, an assassins' guild. To find out more about the Dark Brotherhood, the player is directed to Mournhold, the capital of Morrowind. Upon arrival, the player locates and defeats the head of the Dark Brotherhood, and complete a series of side quests for the new King Helseth and the Living God Almalexia. Almalexia has ruled Morrowind for thousands of years alongside her fellow gods Vivec and Sotha Sil, who call themselves the Tribunal, and are worshipped by the Dark Elves. During the player's visit to Mournhold, a group of mechanical creatures called Fabricants attack the Plaza Brindisi Dorom area. The creatures emerge from the statue in the middle of the plaza, revealing a secret passageway to a Dwemer ruin. Since the creatures are mechanical, it is suspected that the secretive god Sotha Sil is behind this attack. The player investigates the ruins and completes further quests in order to reconstruct Nerevar's lost sword called Trueflame. Upon acquiring the sword, the player is sent to the Clockwork City in order to kill Sotha Sil.

The player explores Clockwork City, finally arriving to find Sotha Sil dead. Upon leaving, Almalexia appears and alleges that she had killed Sotha Sil and instigated the attack in Mournhold, in order to gain more power and control over the citizens and the Tribunal. Driven mad by the Heart of Lorkhan, Almalexia perceived Sotha Sil's silence as mockery. The player is then forced to kill her before returning to Mournhold. As the player exits Almalexia's temple in Mournhold, the Daedric Prince Azura reveals that the Heart of Lorkhan drove Almalexia mad and made her hunger for more power, and that mere mortals cannot become gods without consequences. By destroying the Heart of Lorkhan and killing Almalexia, the player continues fulfilling the Nerevarine prophecies, particularly the death of the Almsivi Tribunal.

== Development ==
The plot and setting of Tribunal was conceived during earlier development in earlier Elder Scrolls titles. Mournhold, the setting of Tribunal, featured as a location in Arena. In 1996, following the release of Daggerfall, Bethesda Softworks began initial work on an unfinished sequel that would later become Morrowind. Also named Tribunal, the sequel was intended to be set in the entirety of the province of Morrowind. Initial development for the title contained "conflicts, characters and themes" later used in the design of the Tribunal expansion, including the use of adamantium armor, and monsters including goblins and liches. However, no staff involved in initial discussions for a sequel to Daggerfall were ultimately involved in the creation of the expansion.

Development on the Tribunal expansion started after the release of Morrowind, and completed in a five-month development cycle from June 2002, with the expansion completed for testing in October 2002. Development of Tribunal was expedited by the inclusion of the Construction Set, providing the development team with tools to quickly add content to the game. The Tribunal development team was a smaller team of 15 to 25 consisting of the 40 Bethesda Softworks staff involved in the creation of Morrowind. Initial work on Tribunal was strained due to fatigue from the Morrowind development cycle, with creative differences between lead designer Ken Rolston and writer Douglas Goodall leading to the departure of Goodall from the studio.

The design of Tribunal was intended to create accessible content for all players irrespective of level or status, with Todd Howard describing the expansion as an "add-in rather than an add-on", noting that "any character can play [Tribunal] at any time". Tribunal's setting, Mournhold, was separated from the main game's setting, requiring players to teleport between the two locations. The developers stated this decision was intentional to minimise the risk of overlapping content with the original game and additions by the modding community. The narrative of Tribunal is strongly anchored by two of the titular god-kings of Morrowind, Amalexia and Sotha Sil, who did not appear in the original game. Designer Mark Nelson stated that initial development of Tribunal's setting involved discussion around "elements we felt weren't fully explored in Morrowind itself", with Todd Howard adding the expansion sought to "follow up on the other two members of the Tribunal, (who) get mentioned often in Morrowind, but there wasn't a real resolution to what happens to them, so that was a story we felt needed exploring." Tribunal features alterations to Morrowind's interface, including sortable quests and map notes. These additions were based on player feedback, with the developers discussing that the journal system was a major complaint from players of the original game. The development team otherwise attempted to minimise the conflicts between gameplay additions and features that had already been introduced by player-created modifications.

=== Release ===
Tribunal was announced on September 6, 2002, and released on November 8, 2002, in North America, and on November 29, 2002, in the United Kingdom. Despite initial statements by Bethesda Softworks that Tribunal would not be released on the Xbox, the expansion, along with its successor, Bloodmoon, was packaged as Morrowind: Game of the Year Edition for PC and Xbox on October 31, 2003.

Following release, lessons from the development of Tribunal informed the development of the game's next expansion, Bloodmoon, released in June 2003. Todd Howard noted reviewers and players found that the expansion was more difficult than expected, as fewer enemies were scaled to the player's level, and the design of the expansion was insufficiently open-ended and lacked wilderness exploration. The developers of Bloodmoon attempted to rectify these issues by providing players with a more open-ended area with greater variety of creatures, dungeons, and loot, a plot that emphasised action that avoided the "political themes" of Tribunal, and greater use of levelled enemies for reduced difficulty.

== Reception ==
=== Reviews ===
The Elder Scrolls III: Tribunal

Aggregate scores
Aggregator	Score
GameRankings	81/100 (based on 28 reviews)
Metacritic	80/100 (PC; based on 16 reviews)

Review scores
Publication	Score
Computer Games Magazine	4/5
Computer Gaming World	3.5/5
GameSpot	7.5/10
GameSpy	7.8/10
GameZone	8.9/10
Hyper	79%
IGN	8.6/10
PC PowerPlay	84%
PC Zone	8.0

Tribunal was generally well received by reviewers. Among aggregate review sites, Metacritic scored the PC version of the game with an 80 out of 100, and GameRankings scored the game at 81 out of 100.

Reviewers praised the updates to the interface and quest journal system as necessary changes to Morrowind's mechanics. Shakil Ahmed of Hyper noted the expansion alleviated problems with the original game's "messy" and fragmented journal system. Computer Gaming World noted that the quest system was an improvement over the "unbearably messy" original, but retained issues accessibility due to organising the game's quests by title. Reviewers generally welcomed the more difficult gameplay in Tribunal. Computer Gaming World stated that the new monsters in the game were "challenging opponents" and was engaging for high-level characters. Some reviewers found the expansion slightly too difficult, with William Abner of GameSpy stating it was "no cakewalk even with some of the more powerful items of the original game".

Critics commended the design of the main quest, but disagreed on the merits of the expansion's setting of Mournhold. Keith Pullin of PC Zone critiqued the expansion as "relatively linear", finding it to lack the sense of scale of the original game. Computer Gaming World similarly viewed the design of Mournhold to be "underpopulated" and "confined". However, other reviewers praised the more focused structure and narrative. Matthew Peckham of Computer Games described the setting of Mournhold as "massive" and comparable to the game's larger cities, highlighting the "deceptively simple detours" and "knotty counter-plots" of its narrative. Steve Polak of PC Powerplay viewed the expansion to be "easier to follow with a better sense of direction" and an alternative to the "open ended and unstructured" design of the original game. Steve Butts of IGN similarly found the main quest to be more focused and better-paced, stating that "unlike Morrowind, you'll rarely lose sight of what you're doing or why".

Some reviewers encountered technical problems with the expansion, including Steve Butts of IGN, who encountered crashes, and William Abner of GameSpy, who discussed the expansion's "bizarre sound problems". The poor pathfinding of the travelling companion and pack rat were also noted by several reviewers. William Abner of GameSpy described the followers as a "pain" to travel with, noting annoyance due to "pathing problems" and "clipping issues". Steve Polak of PC Powerplay also expressed annoyance with NPC pathfinding and follower behavior.
