= The Elder Scrolls III: Morrowind =

2002 video game

- Developer: Bethesda Game Studios
- Publisher: Bethesda Softworks
- Director: Todd Howard
- Designer: Ken Rolston
- Programmer: Craig Walton
- Artist: Matthew Carofano
- Writers: Douglas Goodall; Mark Nelson; Ken Rolston
- Composer: Jeremy Soule
- Series: The Elder Scrolls
- Engine: NetImmerse
- Platforms: Windows; Xbox
- Release: Microsoft Windows: NA: May 1, 2002; EU: May 2, 2002; Xbox: NA: June 7, 2002; EU: November 22, 2002
- Genre: Action role-playing
- Mode: Single-player

The Elder Scrolls III: Morrowind is a 2002 action role-playing game developed by Bethesda Game Studios and published by Bethesda Softworks. It is the third installment in The Elder Scrolls series, following 1996's The Elder Scrolls II: Daggerfall, and was released for Microsoft Windows and Xbox. The main story takes place on Vvardenfell, an island in the Dunmer (Dark Elf) province of Morrowind, part of the continent of Tamriel. The central quests concern the demigod Dagoth Ur, housed within the volcanic Red Mountain, who seeks to gain power and break Morrowind free from Imperial reign.

Though primarily a fantasy game, with many gameplay elements and Western medieval and fantasy fiction tropes inspired by Dungeons & Dragons and previous role-playing games, Morrowind also features some steampunk elements and drew much inspiration from Middle Eastern and South Asian cultures. Morrowind was designed with an open-ended, freeform style of gameplay in mind with less of an emphasis on the main plot than its predecessors. This choice received mixed reactions while maintaining reviewers' appreciation for Morrowind's expansive, detailed game world.

Morrowind achieved critical and commercial success, winning various awards including Game of the Year and selling over four million copies worldwide by 2005. It has since been considered one of the best video games ever made. The game spawned two expansion packs: Tribunal and Bloodmoon. Both were repackaged into a full set and titled Morrowind: Game of the Year Edition, which was released in October 2003. Morrowind was followed by The Elder Scrolls IV: Oblivion in 2006.

== Gameplay ==
=== Character creation ===
Morrowind begins with the player's character, having been imprisoned, arriving in Morrowind by boat to be pardoned. A tutorial depicting the prisoner's release moves the player through the process of character creation. The player is successively asked questions by a fellow prisoner, an officer, and a bureaucrat as the player is registered as a free citizen; choosing, in the process, the player character's name, race, gender, class, and birthsign. These affect the player's starting attributes, skills, and abilities. The player determines their class in one of three ways: picking from a class list, generating a class via questions, or creating a custom class themselves.

=== Skill system ===
The player character's proficiency with a skill is increased through practice, training, and study. Practice involves performing the specific actions associated with a given skill, which gradually raises the character's proficiency in that skill. Raising weapon skills requires striking an enemy with the appropriate weapon; raising armor skills requires being struck while wearing the appropriate type of armor; etc. Training involves paying money to non-player characters (NPCs) in exchange for immediate proficiency increases in that skill. Study requires reading books found, some of which will immediately raise a skill when read. Weaponry skills affect the character's chance to hit. Armor skills affect the defensive strength of the armor. Other skills affect proficiency in other actions such as potion-making, running, lockpicking, etc.

Morrowind, like its predecessor Daggerfall, makes a distinction between attributes and skills; skills are individual proficiencies in particular schools of battle or with particular armor classes, and attributes are broader proficiencies, such as strength and endurance, which are either tied to important features unconnected to any skill, (health, evasion chance, etc.) or improve the efficiency of a wide variety of skills. Strength, for example, improves the damage of any physical blow dealt by the player character. Attributes are improved only when the player levels up.

The player levels up their character by gaining levels in ten pre-determined skills, listed as major and minor skills. Each time the player levels up their character, they can select three attributes to augment as well. The player is better able to augment attributes related to their skill set, as each level gained in a particular skill adds to the multiplier by which the skill's governing attribute is augmented.

=== Combat ===
A screenshot from the game, demonstrating Morrowind's first-person combat

The simplest melee attack is a chop action. The slightly more complex slash and thrust attacks are performed by clicking in unison with tapping a directional key, though by turning on the "always use best attack" option, players can eliminate the moving element, freeing them to focus on the combat. A melee weapon's damage potential is rated for each of these attacks. Reviewers found little value in choosing between the three types of attacks for most weapons and recommended the "always use best attack" option. Hidden arithmetic modifiers, applied to each combatant's skills, determines whether or not the attack hits. In the game's original release, the player was given no indication of the amount of health left in their enemies and no indication of the strength of the player's attacks. Reviewers took the absence badly, wishing for more visible feedback. Bethesda added enemy health bars in patch 1.1.0605, released one month after Morrowind's initial release.

=== Free-form design ===
Following the tradition established by its predecessors in The Elder Scrolls series, Morrowind is an open world with few boundaries constricting players' actions. From the beginning of the game, players are put in a world where they are left to roam, steal, quest, and explore, without necessarily following the main quest. When asked before Morrowind's release which "core, untouchable design elements" of The Elder Scrolls series "set them apart from other games", project leader Todd Howard responded: "Free-form experience." In lead designer Ken Rolston's view, the game's central plot is a chance to introduce the player to a "distracting crosscurrent" of conflicting factions, background themes, and characters of the game, rather than it being the primary focus of the player's experience. Todd Howard has said that "every [The Elder Scrolls] game has to let you create the kind of character you want, and then do the things you want. We would never have a [The Elder Scrolls] role-playing game force you to be a certain character or go down a certain path."

To allow for this behavior, alongside an extensive main quest, Morrowind provides detailed discursive quests for its multiple factions - various guilds, religious organizations, and aristocratic houses - as well as side-quests found by exploration. The main plot itself may be undertaken in many ways. There are, in the words of critic Craig Lindley, "a very specific set of central plot points within this main plot. But the plot points are partially ordered: seven high-level tasks must be completed, but their constituent sub-tasks... can be accomplished in any order, and this is repeated for the sub-tasks involved in those sub-tasks." The choices the player makes in their performance of these tasks thus become methods of character interpretation; a set of dramatic tools establishing the player's newly created self-identity.

According to Gamasutra's Matt Barton, some have argued that these changes put Morrowind closer in spirit to the original Dungeons & Dragons tabletop game, where players take a more creative role in their play and are left to decide for themselves the "right" action. This is a view paralleled by Howard, who has stated that "The goal of every [The Elder Scrolls] game is to create something that resembles a pen and paper RPG on the computer." The sheer number of quest possibilities, combined with what developer Ken Rolston identified as a lack of "narrative urgency", left many critics dissatisfied with the main plot. Ken Rolston later stated that the main quest might have been presented with greater force, in the style of the game's successor, The Elder Scrolls IV: Oblivion, without losing the free-form design of the series, but such concerns were not addressed before Morrowind's release.

== Plot ==
While Morrowind contains many quests and storylines, the central plot revolves around the Tribunal, a triumvirate of god-like beings ruling over Morrowind and their struggle against a former ally: the demigod Dagoth Ur and his Sixth House – a cult of followers stretching out from Red Mountain, the volcanic center of Vvardenfell. Dagoth Ur has used the Heart of Lorkhan, an artifact of great power, to make himself immortal and now seeks to drive the Imperial Legion occupiers from Morrowind using his network of spies, as well as Akulakhan, an enormous mechanical golem powered by the Heart of Lorkhan.

Morrowind's events take place in the 427th year of the Third Era, 22 years after the events of the previous game. After a storm and a strange dream vision, the player character begins in a town called Seyda Neen. Fresh off a boat from a mainland prison, they have been freed by the string-pulling of the current ruler of the Tamrielic Empire, Emperor Uriel Septim VII. The player is given the task of meeting Caius Cosades, a member of the Blades, a secret group of spies and agents working for the Emperor and the Empire.

Cosades inducts the player to the Blades on the Emperor's orders and sets them on various quests to uncover the mysterious disappearances and revelations that the citizens of Vvardenfell have experienced, particularly the Sixth House and the Ashlander prophecies of the Nerevarine. It is later revealed that the induction under Cosades, and the player's release from prison, was due to the Emperor's suspicion that the player might be the Nerevarine – a reincarnation of the legendary Dunmer hero Indoril Nerevar – or at least someone who would make a convincing impostor to use for political gain. The player is tasked with uncovering the prophecies regarding the Nerevarine and to fulfill them to finally defeat Dagoth Ur and his Sixth House cult.

Prophecies from the nomadic Dunmer people living in the Ashlands, the Ashlanders, predict that Nerevar's incarnate will fulfill a set of seven prophecies. The first two prophecies are that the Nerevarine will be born on a certain day to uncertain parents, and will be immune to Corprus disease, a Divine disease created by Dagoth Ur. The player has already fulfilled the first. The player then becomes immune to Corprus by contracting the disease and surviving an experimental cure. Fulfilling these, the player seeks to complete the third prophecy: finding the Moon-and-Star, the symbolic ring originally worn by Nerevar which has the power to instantly kill anyone who tries to wear it. Upon finding and equipping the ring, the player receives a vision from Azura, the ancient Daedric Prince of the Dawn and Dusk, who confirms that the player is Nerevar's incarnate. The Nerevarine completes the fourth and fifth trials, which are to rally the Great Houses of the Dunmer and Ashlanders of Vvardenfell under one banner. After receiving the support and being declared "Hortator" by every Great House and "Nerevarine" by all nomadic Ashlander tribes, the player is officially called "Nerevarine" by the Tribunal Temple, who normally persecutes anyone to death who claims to be the Nerevarine.

The Nerevarine is invited to the palace of the poet god-king Vivec, one of the three deities that form the basis of Morrowind's religion known as the Tribunal, to discuss the assault on Dagoth Ur's stronghold in the heart of Red Mountain. Vivec presents the player with the gauntlet 'Wraithguard', an ancient Dwemer artifact that allows the use of the tools Sunder and Keening. These ancient weapons were created by the Dwemer to tap into the power of the fabled Heart of Lorkhan, which they found beneath Red Mountain - and these same tools have been used by the Tribunal and Dagoth Ur to reach their god-like status. The tools can also destroy the fabled Heart of Lorkhan, but without having the Wraithguard equipped, they will deal a fatal blow to whoever wields them.

The player travels into Red Mountain to Dagoth Ur's citadel. After talking with Dagoth Ur, who attempts to sway the player to his side with the claim that he is merely following Nerevar's final orders, the player and Dagoth Ur fight. Besting Dagoth Ur, the Nerevarine soon discovers that while the Heart of Lorkhan is still intact, Dagoth Ur remains immortal and he soon returns from death. Making his way to the heart of the mountain, the Nerevarine finds the Heart of Lorkhan and destroys it, severing Dagoth Ur from his power and ultimately killing him. Akulakhan's Chamber, where Lorkhan's heart resided, is destroyed in the process as the cavern collapses and in turn, Red Mountain is cleared of blight and The Sixth House falls. Upon escaping from the chamber, the Nerevarine is congratulated by Azura who comes to reward the player's efforts of fulfilling the prophecy.

The game does not end upon the completion of the main quest, but the game world Vvardenfell is affected in many different ways. The Blight Storms cease to plague the land and the weak-minded followers of the Sixth House are reawakened, remembering nothing of their ordeal. The Dreamers who harassed the Nerevarine fall silent and the Nerevarine becomes widely known as the savior of Vvardenfell. The quintessential consequence of defeating Dagoth Ur was the destruction of the Heart of Lorkhan. Due to their immortality linked to the heart, Vivec and the Tribunal become mortal again, leaving Vivec's future in question and up to the player to determine his fate. The loss of divinity among the Tribunal is the main plot point of the game's first expansion, Tribunal.

== Setting ==
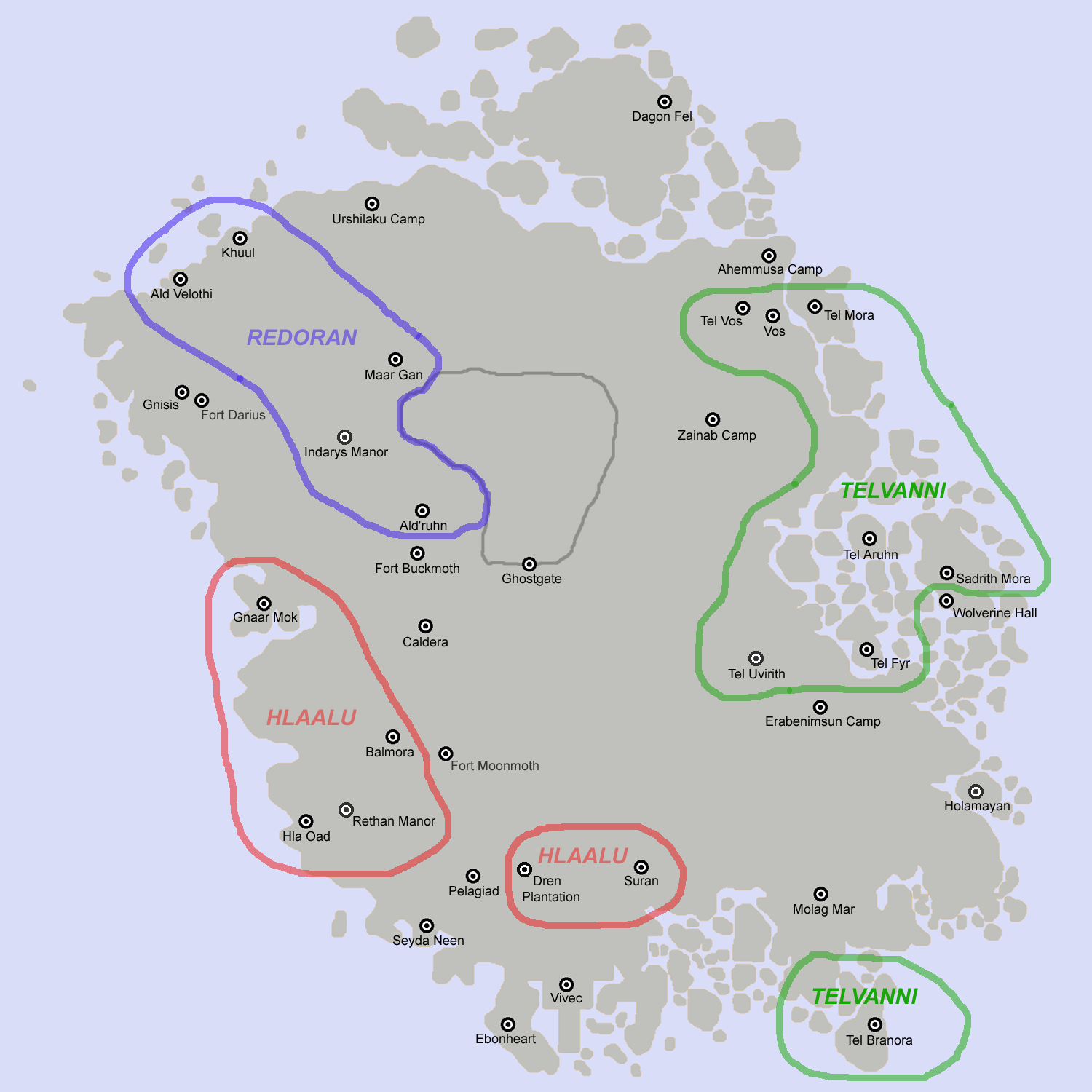
Parts of Vvardenfell region of Morrowind controlled by Hlaalu, Telvanni, and Redoran houses

Morrowind takes place on Vvardenfell, an island in the Dunmer-dominated province of Morrowind, far from the typically European-inspired lands to the west and south depicted in Daggerfall and Arena. Along with graphical improvements, one of the most apparent differences between Morrowind and the earlier games in the series is that Morrowind takes place in a much smaller area than the previous games. While Arena featured the entirety of Tamriel as an explorable area, and Daggerfall featured sizeable portions of two provinces of Tamriel, Hammerfell and High Rock, Morrowind includes only the "relatively small" island of Vvardenfell within the province of Morrowind. The change was a result of a conscious choice on the part of the developers to feature more detail and variety in the game. Whereas Daggerfall and Arena's dungeons were randomly generated, each area in Morrowind was specifically detailed, and each item was individually placed. As a result, reviewers were generally impressed with the game world's variety, as this maintained the perception of an "enormous" game-world. The game area expands to the walled city of Mournhold on Morrowind's mainland in the Tribunal expansion, and the island of Solstheim to the northwest of Vvardenfell in the Bloodmoon expansion.

Morrowind's developers, rather than basing the culture of Morrowind onto the typical Medieval European setting of fantasy games, chose a more eclectic route, taking elements from African cultures, specifically Ancient Egyptian, but also early Japanese, and Middle Eastern cultures. with Egyptian architecture cited in particular for its significant influence on Balmora's Hlaalu architecture. Executive producer Todd Howard felt that the use of Morrowind as a backdrop was integral in the development of the game's style. While admitting some elements of the partially medieval Imperial culture more typical of fantasy to retain familiarity with the earlier installments of the series, Morrowind's Dark Elven setting "opened huge new avenues for creating cultures and sites that are not traditionally seen in a fantasy setting". The development team also gave particular credit to the Ridley Scott film Gladiator, high fantasy, The Dark Crystal, and Conan the Barbarian as influences.

The game has over 300 books (not counting spell scrolls). One particular compilation of the text was 1,241 sheets of 8.25 × 11 inch paper. PC Gamer weighted the in-game text as equal to six typical-size novels. Many of these books provide long, serial stories, and provide hints as to the background and history of the game. One critic, Phillip Scuderi, remembered Morrowind for its great literary richness. To him, the in-game literature and its integration within the game were Morrowind's "most original and lasting contribution to the history of games", one that would place it beside Planescape: Torment as one of the most important games of all time. Such themes are echoed in other responses to the game, such as that of RPGamer's Joseph Witham, who found the story "discreet" in its progression, with a dungeon-crawling feel, standing alongside a "whole world of unique history" with books forming the greater part of the player's interaction with that world.

The game has a great deal of geographic variation in climate, flora, and, to some extent, fauna as well. Besides that, there is also some variety in politics and culture among the in-game populations, the combination of which adds to the uniqueness of different parts of the island. On top of that, there is an archaeological aspect to the game, which gives a certain degree of depth to the story as well as the option for further exploration. Additionally, there are various kinds of limits in visibility such as fog and dust, which are countered with "clear day/night" effects that also enhance visibility to some extent. The central volcano of Red Mountain is constantly covered with ash storms prior to the completion of the main quest, and can be reached through dried lava channels called Foyadas.

The in-game exploration is chiefly based on walking and running; however, there are instances when swimming and sometimes levitation is involved. Transportation of other kinds, such as teleportation, and traveling by boat or on the back of giant flea-like creatures called silt striders, is available for a fee when moving between the various settlements on Vvardenfell as a method of fast travel.

== Development ==
A screenshot from the game demonstrating Morrowind's advanced graphics: pixel-shaded water, long render distances, and detailed textures and models

A third title in The Elder Scrolls series was conceived during the development of The Elder Scrolls II: Daggerfall, though it was initially to be set in the Summerset Isles and called Tribunal. Following the release of Daggerfall, it was set up around an SVGA version of XnGine, which Bethesda later used in The Elder Scrolls Legends: Battlespire, and set in the province of Morrowind. The game was "much closer to Daggerfall in scope", encompassing the whole province of Morrowind, rather than the isle of Vvardenfell, and allowing the player to join all five Dunmer Great Houses. The blight was conceived as a dynamic force, progressively expanding and destroying cities in its wake. It was finally decided that the scope of the original design was too grand given the technology current at the time. According to Ken Rolston, something was said approximating "We're not ready for it, we don't want to jump into this and fail". The project was put on hold in 1997, as Bethesda went on to develop The Elder Scrolls Adventures: Redguard and Battlespire, though the project remained in the back of the developers' minds throughout this period.

The completion of Redguard in 1998 led to a return to the Morrowind project, as the developers felt a yearning in their audience to return to the classically epic forms of the earlier titles. Finding that the gaps between their technical capacities and those of rival companies had grown in the interim, Bethesda sought to revitalize itself and return to the forefront of the industry, an effort spearheaded by project leader Todd Howard. The XnGine was scrapped and replaced with a licensed copy of NetImmerse, a Direct3D powered engine, with transform and lighting capacity, 32-bit textures and skeletal animation. During their promotional campaign, Bethesda deliberately paralleled their screenshot releases with the announcement of NVIDIA's GeForce 4, as "being indicative of the outstanding water effects the technology is capable of".

The scale of the game was much reduced from the earlier concept, focusing primarily on Dagoth Ur and a smaller area of land. It was decided that the game world would be populated using the methods the team had developed in Redguard; that is, the game objects would be crafted by hand, rather than generated using the random algorithmic methods of Arena and Daggerfall. By 2000, Morrowind was to be unequivocally a single-player game, with no chance of multiplayer extension. In the words of Pete Hines, Bethesda's Director of Marketing and PR: "No. Not on release, not three months after, no no no." The project, despite the reduced scale, became a massive investment. According to the team's reasoning, the endeavor took "close to 100 man-years to create". To accomplish this feat, Bethesda tripled their staff and spent their first year of development on The Elder Scrolls Construction Set, allowing the game staff to easily balance the game and to modify it in small increments rather than large. According to project leader Todd Howard, the Construction Set came as the result of a collective yearning to develop a "role-playing operating system", capable of extension and modification, rather than a particular type of game. Despite the additional staff, designer Ken Rolston would later state that, compared to Oblivion, Morrowind had a small design team. Around 40 developers worked on the game.

In May 2000, Bethesda set the first expected PC release date in late 2001. On May 5, 2001, Bethesda announced an additional Morrowind release for Microsoft's Xbox. The project was, according to the same release, something that Bethesda had been working on with Microsoft since they had first known of the console. Morrowind had an impressive showing at E3 2001, demonstrating a beta build to the public. The same beta build was demonstrated to the staff of PC Gamer for another preview and was kept around the office as late as June 19 as the subject of later previews, while another test build was developed alongside. Later order forms, such as those by Electronics Boutique, set the date in November. On October 10, 2001, GameSpot reported that Morrowind's release date had been set back to March 2002. On October 12, a press release from Bethesda gave the date of "Spring 2002", confirming GameSpot's supposition of delay without agreeing on the more specific date of "March". Though no rationale behind the delay was given at the time, developer Pete Hines later attributed the delay to a need for game testing and balancing. Although the PC version of Morrowind had gone gold by April 23, 2002, and was released on May 1 in North America, the Xbox release was delayed further. On April 15, GameSpot suggested an Xbox release date sometime in May and a scheduled "going gold" date for the Xbox version in the first week of the same month. The game was released for Xbox on June 7.

On January 3, 2002, Bethesda announced that game publisher Ubi Soft would take control of the European distribution of Morrowind and eight other Bethesda games. Under Ubi Soft's supervision, Morrowind's European release took place in two stages. A "semi-localized" version of the game was released in May, containing a translated manual but leaving the game's text in untranslated English. A fully localized version of the game, with translated versions of both, was released in August. Ubi Soft group brand manager Thomas Petersen described the difficulties of translating a "universe featuring more than a million words" as "quite a task".

In a break from standard industry practice, Bethesda decided to publish its strategy guide in-house, rather than contracting it out to a third-party publisher like BradyGames or Prima Games. The decision resulted from a belief among Bethesda staff that they believed in and understood Morrowind more than any external agency and deserved more royalties than were commonly rewarded. Bethesda hired Peter Olafson, a noted game journalist and friend of the company, and they began work on the guide in January 2002, four months before release. The resulting product, Morrowind Prophecies Strategy Guide, sold over 200,000 copies as of September 24, 2003. Although the royalties from most third-party game publishers approach 25% to 30% only infrequently, Bethesda managed a 70% profit margin on their own.

=== Audio ===
Title theme to "The Elder Scrolls III: Morrowind" (2002)
18-second sample from Bethesda Softworks' "The Elder Scrolls III: Morrowind"

Morrowind's soundtrack was composed by Jeremy Soule, a video game composer whose previous soundtracks for Total Annihilation and Icewind Dale had earned some acclaim from the gaming press. In a Bethesda press release, Soule stated that the "epic quality" of the Elder Scrolls series was "particularly compatible with the grand, orchestral style of music" that Soule enjoys composing "the most". Outside Bethesda press releases, some have criticized Morrowind's soundtrack. In their reviews of the game, both GameSpot and GameSpy criticized the length of the game's soundtrack and praised its general production quality. In the words of GameSpot's Greg Kasavin: "The very first time you boot up Morrowind, you'll be treated to a memorable, stirring theme filled with soaring strings and booming percussion. You'll proceed to hear it literally every five minutes or so during play." Soule was aware of the problem and chose to create a soft and minimalist score so as not to wear out players' ears.

In a feature for Gamasutra, Scott B. Morton, although praising the music itself, declared that Morrowind's soundtrack did not work effectively with the game's gameplay, accomplishing little as an emotional device. Morrowind's soundtrack is ambient, with cues only for battle encounters. In Morton's view, the lack of variation, response to the game's action, and the short length leave players detached from the game world. Alexander Brandon, in another Gamasutra feature, praised Morrowind's soundtrack for its innovative instrumentation. In Brandon's opinion, its use of orchestral elements in conjunction with synthesized ones, and the use of what Brandon termed "the 'Bolero' approach", left the game's soundtrack feeling "incredibly dramatic". In February 2003, the Academy of Interactive Arts & Sciences nominated Morrowind in the category of "Outstanding Achievement in Original Music Composition" at the 6th Annual Interactive Achievement Awards, but ultimately lost to Medal of Honor: Frontline.

Morrowind also contained a fair bit of voiced dialogue; an aspect somewhat better received by the gaming press. Of note is Lynda Carter, television's Wonder Woman, promoted by Bethesda for her role in voicing the female Nords in the game. Morrowind's race-specific voice acting received praise from some reviewers, though was met with disdain from others, who disliked the discord between a culturally inflected voice spoken in an alien dialect and the grammatically flawless dialogue printed in the dialogue boxes. The Special Edition Soundtrack was released over DirectSong as a digital release.

== Reception ==
Reception

Aggregate score
Aggregator	Score
Metacritic	(PC) 89/100 (Xbox) 87/100

Review scores
Publication	Score
AllGame	4/5
Edge	6/10
Game Informer	9.0/10
GamePro	5/5
GameSpot	8.7/10
GameSpy	89/100
IGN	9.4/10
PC Gamer (US)	90/100

European sales of The Elder Scrolls III: Morrowind reached almost 95,000 units by the end of June 2002, and rose to 200,000 copies by the end of September. By August 2005, the game had surpassed 4 million copies sold. In the United States, Morrowind's computer version sold 300,000 copies and earned $11.7 million by August 2006, after its release in April 2002. It was the country's 62nd best-selling computer game between January 2000 and August 2006. Combined sales of all Elder Scrolls computer games released between those dates had reached 990,000 units in the United States by August 2006.

Morrowind was the best-selling RPG for Xbox in 2002. It was one of the top 10 best-selling games on Xbox from May through October 2003, a full year after its initial launch. The only other game to accomplish this feat was Halo. By February 2006, Morrowind sold nearly a million units on the original Xbox, according to Peter Moore.

The Elder Scrolls III: Morrowind was well received by critics. It was congratulated most frequently for its breadth of scope, the richness of its visuals, and the freedom it worked into its design. Alongside the compliments, however, came criticism that the game designers had overstretched themselves, leaving glitches in various spots, and made a game too taxing to be run on an average machine, with one reviewer calling it "a resource pig". In a retrospective by 1Up, the breadth and open-endedness of Morrowind are suggested to have contributed to the decline of single-player RPGs on home computers by leading customers to MMORPGs, where they could have a similar experience.

In spite of this, reviewers generally felt that the drawbacks of the game were minor in comparison to its strengths. IGN concluded that "Morrowind isn't perfect and its system requirements are huge; but its accomplishments outweigh any reservations." GameSpot's review concluded with a similar summation. "Morrowind does have numerous drawbacks ... But they're all generally minor enough that most anyone should be able to look past them ... They'll otherwise find that Morrowind fulfills its many ambitious intentions. It's a beautiful-looking, sprawling, and completely open-ended game that allows you to play pretty much however you like".

The game environment of Morrowind was applauded as large and richly detailed, particularly for its real-time weather effects, day/night cycle, and its great variety of plant and animal life. Xbox Nation commended the game for its "sheer scope", and credited that aspect as the game's "biggest selling point", though it criticized the slowdowns, travel times and questing complexities that resulted from it. In contrast to the "generic" nature of Daggerfall's design, reviewers found Morrowind's design spectacular, varied, and stunning. GameSpot stated that "Simply exploring Morrowind is possibly the best thing about it."

The mildly complex reciprocal skill system was generally praised, with a few exceptions. IGN, though finding the manual's description of the system unclear, found the classes well balanced and well designed for all play styles. GameSpot found the system transparent and sensible. PC Gamer, by contrast, found the system unbalanced, with combat privileged over other features. Computer Gaming World felt the system's privileging of combinations of single-handed combat weapons and shields over double-handed weapons unnecessarily exploitable, but appreciated the freedom offered by the broad skillset and action-dependent leveling. GameSpy gave strong commendation to the system, stating that "The advancement system makes so much sense that it makes other games, even games set in the D&D world such as Baldur's Gate, look silly by comparison". Morrowind's combat system was poorly received by the gaming press. GameSpot characterized it as one of the game's major weak points, and GameSpy devoted the majority of their review's minor complaints to it. The system was disparaged for its simplicity and tendency to bore.

One element about Morrowind that received particular, and near-universal, criticism, was the game's journal system. In Morrowind, the player has a journal which is automatically updated with information from time to time following conversations with NPCs and important developments in the plot, each new entry following all those previous. Though IGN and GamePro commended the general interface for its relative ease of use, the journal was almost universally reviled. The journal was found to quickly become a "muddled mess", "hundreds of pages long", without any useful method of organization by quest title or completion level. Computer Gaming World called the feature an "anal-retentive nightmare of confusion", and called it one of the game's two greatest shortcomings. However, Bethesda remedied the complaints to some extent in the subsequent expansion Tribunal. There, the journal was organized by quests and could be more easily navigated.

Despite being Bethesda's first major title to be produced for a console, Morrowind's Xbox release was well received in the gaming press. The inability to use add-on modifications on the Xbox version was unhappily felt, as was the decreased resolution, but the qualities of detail and open-endedness which had similarly graced the PC release made good the Xbox release's faults. Morrowind's Xbox release sold very well; it continued to rank among the top 10 sellers on the console one year after its initial release, a feat matched only by Halo: Combat Evolved. In spite of its critical and commercial success, Morrowind did not win any end-of-year press awards for its Xbox release.

=== Awards ===
The editors of Computer Games Magazine named Morrowind the third-best computer game of 2002, and wrote, "Unlike its ambitious but ultimately flawed predecessors, this is Herculean role-playing that works." It was a nominee for PC Gamer US's "2002 Best Roleplaying Game" award, which ultimately went to Neverwinter Nights. Morrowind won GameSpy's PC RPG of the Year Award, though it lost to Neverwinter Nights in reader polls, ranking 24% against Neverwinter's 34.9% popular support. It won IGN's RPG Vault Game of the Year Award, IGN's PC Roleplaying Game of the Year Award in both its editorial and popular forms, RPG Vault's Game of the Year Award 2002, and was IGN's reader's choice for Best Story. Morrowind lost GameSpot's best PC RPG of 2002 award to Neverwinter Nights, but won best Xbox RPG, and was nominated in the "Best Story on Xbox" and "Best Graphics (Artistic) on Xbox" categories. Morrowind, in addition to its nomination for "Outstanding Achievement in Original Music Composition", was also nominated in the category of "Computer Role-Playing Game of the Year" at the 6th Annual Interactive Achievement Awards, but ultimately lost to Neverwinter Nights.

In 2003, Morrowind received the dubious honor of ranking 21st on GameSpy's "25 Most Overrated Games" list, for its "buggy, repetitive, and dull gameplay". In 2010, IGN ranked Dagoth Ur 90th in "Top 100 Videogame Villains".

== Expansions and compilations ==
=== Tribunal ===
The Elder Scrolls III: Tribunal, announced on September 2, 2002, and scheduled for a PC-only release, went gold on November 1 and was released, with little fanfare, on November 6. Tribunal puts the player in the self-contained, walled city of Mournhold, the capital of the province of Morrowind; the new city is not connected to Morrowind's landmass, Vvardenfell, and the player must teleport to it. The storyline continues the story of the Tribunal deities.

The choice to produce the expansion was primarily inspired by the success of Morrowind's release, as well as a general feeling that Elder Scrolls series games are ongoing experiences that merit new things for their players to do. Development on the game began immediately after Morrowind shipped, giving the developers a mere five-month development cycle to release the game—a very fast cycle for the industry. The prior existence of the Construction Set, however, meant that the team "already had the tools in place to add content and features very quickly."

Interface improvements—specifically, an overhaul of Morrowind's journal system—were among the key goals for Tribunal's release. The new journal allowed the player to sort quests individually and by completion, reducing the confusion caused by the original's jumbling together of every quest into a single chronological stream. The game's reviewers took well to the change, although some criticized the incomplete implementation of the system, and others found the system continued to be "a bit unwieldy."

Reviews of Tribunal were generally positive, though to lesser amounts than was the case for Morrowind. Aggregate scoring sites gave the game generally favorable scores: Metacritic, a score of 80; GameRankings, a score of 82. Most critics commented on the higher linearity of the experience, combined with a reduction in the total size of the play area, giving the changes mixed reviews. GameSpot reported sullenly on the change: "it's somewhat surprising that the Tribunal expansion confines your adventures to the relatively small setting of the municipality Mournhold," and that, in light of this change, "Tribunal doesn't have many of the features that made Morrowind so appealing." IGN stated that although "you'll rarely lose sight of what you're doing or why," a fact that may make the game more "comprehensible" for some players, "the lack of interaction with the rest of the world is pretty depressing." RPGamer, by contrast, was unequivocally positive about the change: "Bethesda ... neatly sidesteps two of the most difficult atmospheric flaws of Morrowind—the constant sense of emptiness, and the bland outdoor landscapes—by having the story take place entirely within the city of Mournhold ... This smaller, tighter playing field ensures that every minor detail can and does get attention."

=== Bloodmoon ===
The Elder Scrolls III: Bloodmoon, announced on February 14, 2003, and scheduled for release in May of the same year, went gold by May 23, and was released on June 7. Bethesda began work on the expansion immediately following the release of Tribunal in November 2002. Bloodmoon is a larger expansion than Tribunal, in terms of area covered and content created; it expands the game's main map to include the untamed island of Solstheim located to the northwest of Vvardenfell, a frigid northern tundra sprinkled with forests, and many new varieties of creatures, such as the short but tough rieklings. These additions marked a return to the "open-ended gameplay" and "free-form exploration" of the original, in contrast to the linearity and confinement of Tribunal. Reviews for Bloodmoon were, again, generally positive. Aggregate scoring sites gave the game generally favorable scores: Metacritic, a score of 85; GameRankings, a score of 83.

One of the key selling points of Bloodmoon was its reintegration of werewolves, a feature that had been included in Daggerfall, but was absent in Morrowind, despite being a feature prominently advertised in previews before the game's release. Morrowind instead included vampirism, which was almost an "Easter egg" in terms of how many players remained unfamiliar with the feature. Players become werewolves by catching the lycanthropic disease "Sanies Lupinus" and letting three days pass without getting it cured. Once the disease has been fully integrated, the player transforms every night, regardless of the lunar cycle. Being a werewolf provides ability increases, though their strength was reduced relative to the major bonuses offered by lycanthropy in Daggerfall. Some reviewers found the addition to be a welcome challenge, but others thought it frustrating and poorly implemented.

=== Game of the Year Edition ===
The Elder Scrolls III: Morrowind Game of the Year Edition was announced May 12, 2003, and released October 31 of the same year. It compiled both the Tribunal and Bloodmoon expansions, along with patches available only for the PC release, and offered them up in one single package for both PC and Xbox platforms. This provided Xbox players with most of the game content they had not previously had access to. Absent, however, from the Xbox version was the improved journal included in Bethesda's Bloodmoon and Tribunal releases, as well as the later patched editions of Morrowind's original release. Reviewers responded to the absence negatively.

Nonetheless, reviews for the GotY set were generally positive – more so than for all previous releases of the game. Metacritic gave the edition an aggregate score of 89; GameRankings, an 88. PC Gamer redistributed this version under their "PC Gamer Presents" line.

== Modifications ==
=== The Elder Scrolls Construction Set ===
A screenshot of The Elder Scrolls Construction Set for The Elder Scrolls III: Morrowind, demonstrating the utility's automated cell and object lists

Bethesda Softworks, the developer of Morrowind, offers the ability to change the game via plugins (often referred to as modifications, or mods for short) using The Elder Scrolls Construction Set, which comes with the PC version of the game. The Construction Set, and a variety of third-party mod-making tools, allow the modder to create and edit different objects, places, characters, dialogues, races, birthsigns, abilities, and skills. Characters can be made as strong or as fast as the user wants, and allows the player to experience the game in a way that would not normally be possible within the game's mechanics.

These plugins are usually easy to install and can change almost everything in the game. Plugins can add or modify existing mechanics, creatures, weapons, armor, quests, people, playable species, Easter eggs, stores, player-owned houses, cities, plotlines, and entire landmasses with some or all of the above.

=== Official and player modifications ===
Many major player modifications for Morrowind introduce new areas or quests, and several organized projects have attempted to recreate the provinces of Tamriel consistent with their presentation in earlier or later Elder Scrolls titles. The Tamriel Rebuilt project, founded in 2001 and still active, is a fan-made expansion to the game with the aim of recreating the entire mainland province of Morrowind, with the first release in 2006, and new areas added continually since that time. Similar projects include the Project: Tamriel series, which aims to recreate Cyrodiil (shown in The Elder Scrolls IV: Oblivion) and Skyrim (shown in The Elder Scrolls V: Skyrim) with portrayals more consistent with their descriptions in Morrowind. Arktwend, a total conversion mod developed by SureAI (the same developers behind Nehrim: At Fate's Edge and Enderal: The Shards of Order), was developed on Morrowind's engine and requires Morrowind, Tribunal, and Bloodmoon to play.

Many other mods change or enhance the graphical aspects of the game, such as lighting, 3D models, colors, and textures. Others attempt to optimise demanding meshes (e.g. by reducing draw calls or texture atlasing) or fix unpatched bugs left in the game with unofficial patches. Additionally, Bethesda has produced official mods, such as Siege at Firemoth, which may be found on the official site. All official plugins are included in the GOG.com release of the Game of the Year Edition.

== OpenMW ==
OpenMW is an open-source, free-software replacement game engine that supports playing the original and add-on Morrowind content natively (without emulation or a virtual machine) on Linux, macOS, Windows, and certain Android devices. It supports higher-resolution graphics (installed as mods) than the original Bethesda engine, but requires a copy of the original game, in any edition, for its data files. Most third-party mods that are not dependent on any MS Windows executables and which are free of serious scripting syntax errors are also compatible with OpenMW. Since 2016, all of the quests, classes, races, and other character choices of Morrowind and its official expansions and add-ons are fully playable in OpenMW, though it remains in extended beta testing as of 2020. OpenMW is also the basis for TES3MP, an attempt to develop a networked, multiplayer version of the game, in early alpha testing as of 2017.

== Remasters as add-ons ==
Another fan labor effort, The Elder Scrolls Renewal Project, has been working on remastering Morrowind to run as add-ons for later games in The Elder Scrolls franchise (as Morroblivion for Oblivion, and Skywind for Skyrim). The project is also working on a remaster of Oblivion to run within Skyrim (under the name Skyblivion).
