= Nicolas Samuel Lietzau =

German video game writer

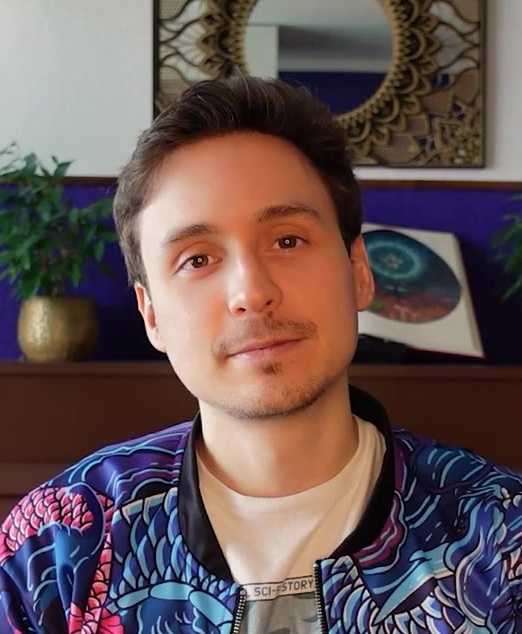
- Lietzau in 2023
- Born: 25 May 1991 (age 35); Munich, Germany
- Occupation: Video game writer
- Website: nicolaslietzau.com

Nicolas Samuel Lietzau-Schreiber (born 25 May 1991) is a German video game writer. He worked on Enderal, a total conversion for the role-playing game Skyrim. He was also the lead writer for the role-playing/strategy game SpellForce 3 and worked on the Gothic 1 Remake.

== Career ==
Lietzau was a project leader for Enderal, which had been in development since 2012. He led the development and the writing of Enderal's team SureAI. In 2016, he worked on the downloadable content (DLC) Forgotten Stories for Enderal. In March 2017, Lietzau worked as a writer on SpellForce 3. Due to the game's design being set in stone, he did not have complete creative control with the story, with his task being to bring the setting to life through dialogue writing.

In December 2020, Lietzau published Dreams of the Dying, the first in a trilogy of novels set in the Enderal universe. Initially published as a serial web novel in 2018, it was rewritten from the ground-up following positive reception in order to address what Lietzau felt were structural flaws in the web release.

Lietzau worked on the remake of the role-playing game Gothic for Alkimia Interactive as narrative designer and writer. It was released in 2026.

== Works ==
=== Video games ===
Year	Title	Role
2016	Enderal: The Shards of Order	Project director, lead writer, game designer, programmer
2017	SpellForce 3	Lead writer
2019	Enderal: Forgotten Stories	Project director, lead writer, game designer, programmer
2019	SpellForce 3: Soul Harvest	Lead writer
2020	SpellForce 3: Fallen God	Lead writer
2026	Gothic 1 Remake	Narrative design, writing

=== Books ===
Year	Title	Series
2020	Dreams of the Dying	The Twelfth World
2026	The Cure for Living, Part One	The Twelfth World
2026	The Cure for Living, Part Two	The Twelfth World
