= The Elder Scrolls III: Bloodmoon =

- Developer: Bethesda Game Studios
- Publisher: Bethesda Softworks
- Series: The Elder Scrolls
- Engine: Gamebryo
- Platforms: Microsoft Windows; Xbox
- Release: Microsoft Windows: NA: June 3, 2003; UK: June 27, 2003; Xbox (GOTY Edition): NA: October 31, 2003; EU: February 20, 2004
- Genre: Action role-playing
- Mode: Single-player

The Elder Scrolls III: Bloodmoon is the second expansion pack for the 2002 video game The Elder Scrolls III: Morrowind, developed by Bethesda Game Studios and released for Windows in 2003. The expansion was later released as part of the Morrowind: Game of the Year Edition for the Xbox in 2004. The expansion adds a landmass to the game, Solstheim, a setting modelled on Norse mythology. The primary questline of Bloodmoon involves the investigation of the Bloodmoon Prophecy that foretells the return of the demigod Hircine. A secondary features a new faction, the East Empire Company, which tasks the player to establish a mining colony. Bloodmoon also provides the player with the ability to become a werewolf, a feature closely embedded in the main storyline and quests. The expansion features more detailed environments, including weather shaders such as snowfall and blizzards.

Bloodmoon was developed over six months with a stated objective of making a more open-ended expansion focused on action and exploration, in contrast to the closed design of the previous expansion, The Elder Scrolls III: Tribunal. Design of the game's questlines reflected a more open-ended ethos, with the use of branching questlines reflecting player choices. Upon release, Bloodmoon received positive reviews from critics, with praise directed to the expansion's highly distinctive visual design and landscape and the design of its branching questlines, particularly the East Empire Company questline, with criticism directed towards the limitations of gameplay when playing as a werewolf and various performance issues and bugs. Solstheim, the setting of Bloodmoon, would return as the primary setting for an Elder Scrolls game in Dragonborn, an expansion to The Elder Scrolls V: Skyrim released in 2012.

== Gameplay ==
Gameplay in Bloodmoon is largely identical to that in Morrowind, with the game functioning as an extension of quests and open-ended locations to explore. In contrast to the first expansion, Tribunal, which added a city separate from the world map consisting of interior cells, Bloodmoon adds an island to the original world map. Players access the Bloodmoon content and questline by asking non-player characters about the "latest rumors", directing them to a ship that transports them to Solstheim, or alternately locating the ship themselves. The expansion is directed towards higher-level characters at or above level 20, with more difficult enemies including wolves, bears, boars, snow goblins, and wood-spirit Spriggans that must be defeated three times before properly killed. The game features several weapon and armor types, including Stalhrim Ice, Nordic Silver and Snow Wolf, with players able to complete a quest that provides access to non-player characters that can exchange weapons and armor from ice and pelts.

Bloodmoon introduces the ability for the player to become a werewolf. Encountering a werewolf in combat exposes the player to a disease, Sanies Lupis, for three days, during which the player can choose to seek a cure. If the player is not cured within this period, every night the player experiences a short dream cutscene and transform into a werewolf. This form grants the player the 'Eye of the Wolf' ability, which grants increased strength, agility and speed attributes. However, the player can only use their claws in this state, and is unable to use weapons, armor, magical items or cast spells, and is vulnerable to silver weapons. The player is required to kill at least one player character per night to avoid health loss. If non-player characters witness the player transitioning into a werewolf, all non-player characters in the game world permanently attack the player on sight, in and out of their werewolf state.

== Plot ==
Critics praised the visual design of Solstheim, the setting of Bloodmoon, for its more detailed environments and weather shaders.

=== Setting ===
Bloodmoon is set in Solstheim, an island between the provinces of Morrowind and Skyrim. The island is recently colonized by the Empire, who administer it from Fort Frostmoth. However, most of Solstheim is uninhabited wilderness, occupied by outlying villages of indigenous Nord tribes, including the Skaal who occupy a major village and the mead hall of Thirsk. On the south end of the island is Raven Rock, the site of a prospective ebony mining colony being developed by the East Empire Company. Dragonborn, an expansion to The Elder Scrolls V: Skyrim also takes place on the island of Solstheim, set after the events of Bloodmoon.

=== Story ===
Bloodmoon introduces two major questlines: a main quest and a factional quest for the East Empire Company. The player initiates the main quest by interacting with Falx Carius, the Captain of Fort Frostmoth, completing small tasks to improve the morale of the fort. Upon completion, the player returns to fort to discover it has been attacked and Carius is missing. The player travels north to the land of the Skaal and completes a series of rituals and tests to gain the trust of the leader, Tharsten Heart-Fang. The player investigates signs of what the Skaal describe as the Bloodmoon Prophecy, in which the appearance of disturbances and werewolves in Solstheim signal the return of the Daedric Prince Hircine in each Age. The player is infected with the werewolf disease, Sanies Lupinus, when the Skaal Village becomes attacked by werewolves, and Heart-Fang is discovered missing. At this point, the main quest diverges depending upon whether the player chooses to cure themselves of the disease to assist the Skaal, or to become a werewolf and fight the Skaal on behalf of Hircine. In the end, both threads converge as the Bloodmoon Prophecy becomes true and Hircine abducts the player for the Great Hunt. Reunited with Carius and Heart-Fang, who have also been abducted for the Great Hunt, the player navigates the maze within Mortrag Glacier to find and defeat the aspect of Hircine to put an end to the Great Hunt.

The East Empire Company questline is a secondary questline in which the player joins the faction and assists in the establishment of a mining colony on the site of Raven Rock. Players initiate the questline by talking to Carnius Magius, the Factor of the expedition, whose unscrupulous plans for the colony often come at odds with his deputy, Falco Galenus. For most of the questline, players can side with Carnius or Falco to undertake tasks to build the colony, including establishing the mine, choosing which type of shops to construct, and resolving problems in the colony including missing shipments, thieves, and disturbances from local natives and monsters. At the end of the questline, the player either aids Carnius to stage an attack on the colony, only to be attacked in turn as Carnius has deemed the player is a liability, or assist Falco in defending the colony against Carnius' fake attack. Both branches end with the player confronting Carnius and defeating him, being rewarded with a promotion as the new Factor of the colony and constructing a player-owned estate in Raven Rock.

== Development ==
Bloodmoon was developed over a six month period from November 2002, and was intended as the last expansion for Morrowind. The concept of Bloodmoon was raised by executive producer Todd Howard, who presented the three core ideas of "werewolves, Nords and snow" to form the basis of the expansion. Bloodmoon was designed as an action-oriented expansion, with a focus on designing an environment filled with new dungeons, creatures and loot. This approach was pursued to contrast with the design of Tribunal, which was conceived as a political drama, with lead project manager Ashley Cheng remarking the developers found that expansion to lack an open-ended landscape to explore. The addition of the expansion's remote island setting of Solstheim was designed to minimise interference with the core game and user modifications. The inclusion of werewolves was the focus of the project team's programming efforts, cited by the developers as the most requested feature for inclusion in Morrowind from players. Designer Mark Nelson recounted that the implementation of werewolves in the game was the centre of the expansion's design, prompting the "large-scale" creation of a branching questline to differentiate players who did and did not choose to become a werewolf.

Bloodmoon was announced by Bethesda Softworks on February 14, 2003, with a gold master of the game finalised in May and released on June 3, 2003, in the United States and June 27 in Europe. Morrowind: Game of the Year Edition, which included the original game and its expansions, Tribunal and Bloodmoon, was released for PC and Xbox in October 2003.

== Reception ==
The Elder Scrolls III: Bloodmoon

Aggregate score
Aggregator	Score
Metacritic	85/100 (PC; based on 21 reviews)

Review scores
Publication	Score
Computer Games Magazine	4.5/5
Computer Gaming World	4/5
GameSpot	85%
GameSpy	4/5
GameZone	9.0/10
IGN	8.9/10
PC Gamer (US)	84%
PC PowerPlay	80%
PC Zone	85%
RPGamer	7/10

Bloodmoon was received positively by reviewers, with review aggregator Metacritic indicating the game received "Generally favorable reviews" with an average score of 85 out of 100 based on 21 reviews. Reviewers praised the open-ended approach of the expansion as an improvement compared to its predecessor, Tribunal. Steve Butts of IGN was "glad to return to the more-open ended adventuring available in Bloodmoon in contrast to the cramped setting of Tribunal. Daniel Wilks of PC PowerPlay similarly praised Bloodmoon for pursuing a "freeform style" reminiscent of Morrowind in contrast to the "scripted linearity" of Tribunal. Steven Bellotti of RPGamer commended the design of Solstheim as "well laid-out" and varied in its locations, finding it to be a good balance between the "cramped" design of Tribunal and the "widespread and empty" design of Morrowind.

The visual design and landscape of Solstheim, the setting in Bloodmoon, was also unanimously praised for its distinctiveness and visual appeal. Steve Butts of IGN praised Bloodmoon as a "graphical treat", stating "the snow-shrouded forests of Solstheim provide a welcome change of pace", and "the (snow) particles build up to a virtual blizzard (and) it makes a fantastic visual and convinces you that this is a real world." William Abner of GameSpy praised Solstheim as "an entirely new landscape" that "looks and feels like a foreign land compared to the rest of the settings in Morrowind, not just a tacked-on area." Chris Anderson of PC Zone similarly highlighted the "new landscapes" and "lush and expansive forests" helped made the expansion feel "like a completely different game". Several critics highlighted the expansion's use of more detailed environments and snow shaders, whilst noting they affected the game's performance.

Reviewers provided particular praise for the main quest and East Empire Company faction, which sees a game area, Raven Rock, change based on player decisions throughout the questline. Matthew Peckham for Computer Games praised the questline as "ingenious", stating "this sort of thoughtful scripting is what sets a Bethesda role-playing experience apart from its peers. Ron Dulin of GameSpot praised the "complex" East Empire Company questline, stating "the new quests are at least as engaging as those in the original game and emphasize the best role-playing aspects of the series." Steven Bellotti of RPGamer similarly stated that the questline "gives Morrowind what it's been lacking all this time - a way to actually affect the world around you".

Whilst the inclusion of werewolves and lycanthropy in Bloodmoon was featured by many reviewers as a highlight of the expansion, reviewers were divided on its implementation. Ron Dulin of Computer Gaming World critiqued the feature, stating "the implementation isn't very exciting...the need to feed every night can become fairly tiresome, and because werewolves have only their claws as weapons, combat can get repetitive." GameSpot reviewers agreed, finding that whilst play as a werewolf was "a more interesting and challenging alternative to regular adventuring", the permanent mechanic of being attacked on sight by all characters if being seen transitioning between man and werewolf states was "an artificial mechanic that compromises the otherwise immersive setting". Steven Bellotti of RPGamer found the "static and unchanging" attributes of werewolves to be poorly tailored to the expansion's difficult enemies.

Many reviewers observed the graphics of Bloodmoon pushed the performance of their system. Daniel Wilks of PC Powerplay noted "(the game's) facelift comes at the price of framerates - even on high-end machines, combat in the snow can cause the game to chug." GameSpot similarly commented that "since Bloodmoon features even more detailed and populated environments (than Morrowind), the practical system requirements have also correspondingly increased... the resulting reduction in frame rates worsens one of the main problems many players had with the original game."
