= Tamriel Rebuilt =

Fan-led video game modification

- Splash screen of version 26.08 (Poison Song)
- Developer: Tamriel Rebuilt Project
- Platform: Windows
- Release: WW: 13 September 2006
- Genre: Role-playing
- Mode: Single-player

Tamriel Rebuilt is a third-party modification for The Elder Scrolls III: Morrowind, a 2002 role-playing video game published by Bethesda Softworks. Founded in 2001, the Tamriel Rebuilt project is a long-term collaborative effort by volunteer modders to expand the content of Morrowind to include wider settings consistent with the setting of the Elder Scrolls' universe of Tamriel. Since foundation, the project has published ten releases for Morrowind, described as expansions, that allow the player to travel to and explore the mainland of the province of Morrowind, featuring new factions and quests. In 2006, Tamriel Rebuilt briefly launched a secondary project to recreate the province of Hammerfell in the succeeding Elder Scrolls game, The Elder Scrolls IV: Oblivion, although the project was cancelled in 2009.

Tamriel Rebuilt has formally released ten expansions for Morrowind for download and one for Oblivion. The project has been praised for its scope, detail and faithfulness of its additions, with critics observing that the content has since eclipsed the size and features of the original game.

== Setting and gameplay ==
Tamriel Rebuilt expands the world of Morrowind to the mainland of the province of Morrowind in Tamriel, enveloping the original game's setting, the island of Vvardenfell. Tamriel Rebuilt have since released content that covers the northeastern to southern part of the province, controlled by a wide set of factions seen in the original game. The northeast of Morrowind's mainland spans the land owned by the Great House Telvanni, including the faction's capital, Port Telvannis. The southeast includes the holdings of the Tribunal Temple and the Great House Indoril, including the cities of Akamora and Necrom. In the south are lands controlled by the Great House Hlaalu, with cities including Bal Foyen and Hlan Oek that border the western end of the Thirr River south to Narsis and Black Marsh. Scattered across the mainland are the forts and outposts of the Cyrodiilic Empire, who control large inner coastal cities including Firewatch and Old Ebonheart. Content in Tamriel Rebuilt is not a total conversion or overhaul of the game but introduces an additional landmass, the mainland of Morrowind, which the player can freely travel to directly or by ship.

Gameplay in Tamriel Rebuilt is identical to the gameplay in Morrowind, with the content serving the same function as an expansion to the game. In contrast to Morrowind, Tamriel Rebuilt does not feature a main quest but provides factional quests that sit alongside the questlines in the original game, including for the Great Houses Hlaalu and Telvanni, guilds, vampire clans, and miscellaneous quests. As of the Grasping Fortune update, Tamriel Rebuilt features over 900 quests, in contrast to the 506 quests in Morrowind and its expansions.

== Development ==
=== Development for Morrowind ===
The Tamriel Rebuilt project was conceived in 2001 prior to the release of Morrowind. Previous Elder Scrolls titles, including Arena and Daggerfall, were set across several large, procedurally generated open-world provinces in the continent of Tamriel. In contrast to initial assumptions that Morrowind would provide a similarly large scope, early previews of the game by developer Bethesda Softworks revealed the setting would be limited to Vvardenfell, an island within the province of Morrowind, to provide greater detail. Disappointment about the scope of the game prompted several fan proposals to create the remainder of Tamriel with the game's announced Construction Set. In 2001, Ender, a member of the Elder Scrolls Forums, posted an idea for users to create a modification that would expand the game to all of Tamriel, with the post leading to several forum users collaborating to create a website and forum to organize the project. Upon release of Morrowind, the Tamriel Rebuilt project assembled as a "consortium of largely autonomous modders" of different levels of commitment and experience, with the project co-ordinating claims to create different areas using the game's grid-based exterior cells. Later years have seen development become more comprehensively planned to ensure a higher level of quality and consistency across the project.

=== Development for Oblivion ===
From 2006 to 2009, Tamriel Rebuilt diverged to develop expanded content for Oblivion with a project to implement the province of Hammerfell into the game. Initial concept and design work was undertaken by the project, including the publication of a forty-page concept art book. On 14 February 2009, the project made its first and only formal release, Stirk, which implemented a small island in Hammerfell of the same name off of the western coast of Cyrodil. In December 2009, the Tamriel Rebuilt project announced an end to its work on Hammerfell, citing a lack of manpower to create assets, which were of a higher level of quality compared to those in Morrowind.

=== Development for other provinces ===
With the exception of the 2009 Stirk release, Tamriel Rebuilt only publishes mods that add the mainland of Morrowind into The Elder Scrolls III: Morrowind. However, they work closely with a similar project, Project Tamriel, which seeks to add more regions of Tamriel into Morrowind. The two projects have a shared asset repository and lore.

As of 2026, Project Tamriel has playable releases for Skyrim and Cyrodiil, with further releases for these regions, plus releases for High Rock and Hammerfell, in active development.

== Releases ==
Game	Release	Release date	Key additions	Citation
The Elder Scrolls III: Morrowind	Telvannis	23 September 2006	Firewatch, Port Telvannis	
The Elder Scrolls III: Morrowind	Antediluvian Secrets	30 November 2008	Helnim, Kemel-Ze	
The Elder Scrolls III: Morrowind	Sacred East	6 June 2012	Akamora, Necrom	
The Elder Scrolls III: Morrowind	Old Ebonheart	31 July 2018	Old Ebonheart	
The Elder Scrolls III: Morrowind	Aanthirin	19 December 2019	Almas Thirr	
The Elder Scrolls III: Morrowind	Dominions of Dust	24 November 2022	Bal Foyen (Note: Known as Andothren on release)	
The Elder Scrolls III: Morrowind	Embers of Empire	24 November 2022	Firewatch, Helnim	
The Elder Scrolls III: Morrowind	Andaram	31 October 2023	Almas Thirr	
The Elder Scrolls III: Morrowind	Firemoth Rekindled	23 December 2024	Saros Archipelago	
The Elder Scrolls III: Morrowind	Grasping Fortune	1 May 2025	Narsis	
The Elder Scrolls III: Morrowind	Poison Song	23 August 2026	Reworked Sundered Scar	
The Elder Scrolls IV: Oblivion	Stirk	6 February 2009	Isle of Stirk	

== Reception ==
The Tamriel Rebuilt project has been praised for its ambition and large scope, with some remarking that the project provided ample reason for players to revisit Morrowind, and many observing the additions met or exceeded the amount of content found in the original game in terms of the size and number of locations and quests. Describing it as a "must-play", Will Nelson of PC Games Network praised the mod as "next-level stuff" due to the "sheer amount of content" added to the game, and highlighted the project's close adherence to the "official lore" of the Elder Scrolls universe. PC Gamer awarded the Tamriel Rebuilt project as one of the best single-player mods in 2009. Also writing for PC Gamer, Luke Winkie highlighted its faithfulness to the "canon, themes and tone" of Morrowind in contrast to other recent representations of the Morrowind mainland as in The Elder Scrolls Online, stating the project "intends to fill in the blanks of Morrowind as honorably and dutifully as they can", citing the inclusion of fan-created literature in in-game books. Game Rant, who cited the mod as one of the best for Morrowind, observed that whilst the game was an "enormously ambitious project" compatible with the "general look and feel" of Morrowind, the additions looked a "little dated" given the age of the original game. Matthew S. S. Johnson of Southern Illinois University wrote on how Tamriel Rebuilt is a unique example of community-based authorship of game-inspired texts, where the "serious dedication and participation" of the community blurs the line between the authors and audiences of video games.
