= CityVille 2 =

2012 video game

- Developer: Zynga East
- Publisher: Zynga
- Composer: Grant Kirkhope
- Platform: Internet
- Release: Facebook; November 1, 2012
- Genres: City-building, construction and management simulation
- Modes: Single-player, multiplayer

CityVille 2 is a defunct casual social city-building simulation game developed by Zynga and released globally on Facebook November 1, 2012. CityVille 2 was a 3D game that was story-based, with a mystery that unfolds as the player’s city evolves and it was a sequel to CityVille. The game was free, though players had the option to purchase premium content.

== History ==
=== Inception ===
CityVille 2, developed by Zynga East, rolled out globally on November 1, 2012 in 15 languages. CityVille 2 is Zynga’s second 3D game (following FarmVille 2) and the first that allows players to switch between day and night mode. The game is Zynga’s third built on Adobe Flash Player 11. In addition to being available on Facebook, CityVille 2 will debut "soon" on Zynga.com.

=== Cancellation ===
On February 5, 2013, Zynga announced that CityVille 2 is cancelled, with the banner stating "CityVille 2 is no longer available to new players and will no longer be accepting payments. Current CityVille 2 players will be able to access the game until March 7, 2013." Now, no players, including the ones that played it before stage 1 cancellation, can access the game. However, many groups are trying to revive the game.

== Gameplay ==
The CityVille 2 storyline begins with an explosion at the mayor's mansion. Players assume the role of the mayor, seeking to discover who or what caused the explosion. The "whodunit" plot includes suspects such as a community activist, a wealthy industrialist, and a reality TV star wannabe.

As the game progresses, players attempt to revive a virtual city through the creation of businesses, museums, homes, roads, and parks. CityVille 2 players add residential and commercial buildings to a preset grid, unlocking more available land as buildings generate resources to spend. Resources such as bricks, paper, and boxes needed for producing other items are collected by clicking on houses and businesses. Players must also deal with simulated urban problems such as fires, traffic and crime. Players can manually switch between day and nighttime modes, with game elements tied to specific times of day. The 3D graphics include a camera feature, which allows players to view their city from different angles.

CityVille 2 has social elements built in, such as real-time in-game chat. Players are encouraged to develop districts dedicated to specific demographics or themes, such as a French Quarter or Chinatown, to earn additional bonuses and compete with friends on District leaderboards. Visiting a friend’s city and clicking on a building helps level up whichever district those buildings are in. Players who visit a district in a friend’s city the most become that district’s VIP.

== Currency ==
CityVille 2 was free to play. Players had the option to purchase premium items and the ability to unlock higher-level items without having to meet that level's requirement.

== Awards and nominations ==
During the 16th Annual D.I.C.E. Awards, the Academy of Interactive Arts & Sciences nominated CityVille 2 for "Web Based Game of the Year".
