= ModDB =

Video game modding website

- The ModDB logo, here in a vector image conversion of the original raster logo.

- ModDB home page as of July 2026
- Website type: Game modifications, indie games
- Owner: DBolical Pty Ltd.
- Creator: Scott "INtense!" Reismanis
- Website: www.moddb.com
- Commercial: Yes
- Registration: Free
- Launched: 8 June 2002; 24 years ago
- Current status: Active
- Written in: PHP

ModDB (/mɒddiːbiː/ MOD-dee-BEE) is a website that focuses on general video game modding. It was founded in 2002 by Scott "INtense!" Reismanis. As of August 2026, the ModDB site has received over 2 billion views, has more than 36,000 modifications registered, and has hosted more than 382 million downloads. A spin-off website, IndieDB, was launched in 2010 and focuses on indie games and news. The website has retained a mostly traditional user interface, with its overall layout, dark red theme, and design remaining largely unchanged since 2008.

== History ==
Scott Reismanis, a website developer from Melbourne, Australia, first pursued web development as a hobby, creating two websites dedicated to video games. Afterwards, he purchased the ChaosRealm.com domain and formed the Realm Network. The network comprised over twenty websites, one of which was ModDB's predecessor, ModRealm. Launched in 1998, ModRealm was initially dedicated to Counter-Strike cheat codes before becoming a modding website. The website became defunct in December 2001, when its network was shut down after its hosting service, Playnet, filed for bankruptcy.

Reismanis was motivated to start a new website by the difficulty of searching for mods on the then-dominant search engine, AltaVista, much less mods released to the public. He began ModDB's development in January 2002, following IMDb's structure in the process. The website was launched as Mod Database in June 2002. It differed from his earlier websites in that its articles were managed by the community, not only the website's founder. By January 2005, ModDB listed 49,539 members and 2,191 mods. In 2006, the ModDB team launched AddonDB, whose aim was to list additional content for games not applicable under the category of game modifications. This includes models, skins and maps. Just one year into service, it was merged into ModDB.

Reismanis was an information technology consultant at Accenture and intended to keep ModDB his hobby, but he left the firm to found DesuraNET as the website's hosting company, citing the expense of running the website and his recollection of IGN's 2006 attempt to acquire it. ModDB was integrated into DesuraNET's Desura, which was a digital distribution service that focused on indie games. The service opened in April 2010 as a competitor to Valve's Steam.

== Features ==
The purpose of ModDB is to list the mods, files, tutorials and information of any games that are capable of being modded with user-made content. The website allows users to create pages for mods, upload screenshots and files, publish news, and request help from the community. Scott's intentions, from the beginning, were to get the community heavily involved in the creation and development of the website. To this end, the most active members were chosen as moderators and administrators. The core staff generally remain the same, while lower positions are heavily rotated among trainee moderators, and administrator candidates.

ModDB's terms of use prohibit certain types of content, including pornographic, defamatory, and obscene content, as well as material that incites crime or hatred, violates intellectual property law under the terms of the copyright law of Australia and the Digital Millennium Copyright Act, or otherwise "brings [the website] into disrepute." Nevertheless, the website received mainstream media attention when in early 2011 it hosted School Shooter: North American Tour 2012, a Half-Life 2 mod. The mod's premise led to a number complaints accusing the website of being involved in the project, prompting the website to shut it down in March.

== Mod of the Year ==
ModDB's Mod of the Year competition, the Golden Spanner awards, was established to recognize what it described as “inventive and high-quality” mods. Mods are chosen via a community vote and are then reviewed by staff to produce the final list of winners. The competition aims to encourage all fields of modding, with different categories such as graphics and gameplay, as well as a traditional "best mod" winner. Notable winners include Garry's Mod for Half-Life 2 in 2005, Insurgency: Modern Infantry Combat for Half-Life 2 in 2007, Black Mesa for Half-Life 2 in 2012, and Brutal Doom for Doom in 2017. Similarly, ModDB's Mod Hall of Fame retrospectively reviews mods and inducts what it judges to be the greatest mods of the year of their release. Inductees include PlayerUnknown's Battle Royale for ARMA 3 in 2014.

== IndieDB ==
IndieDB
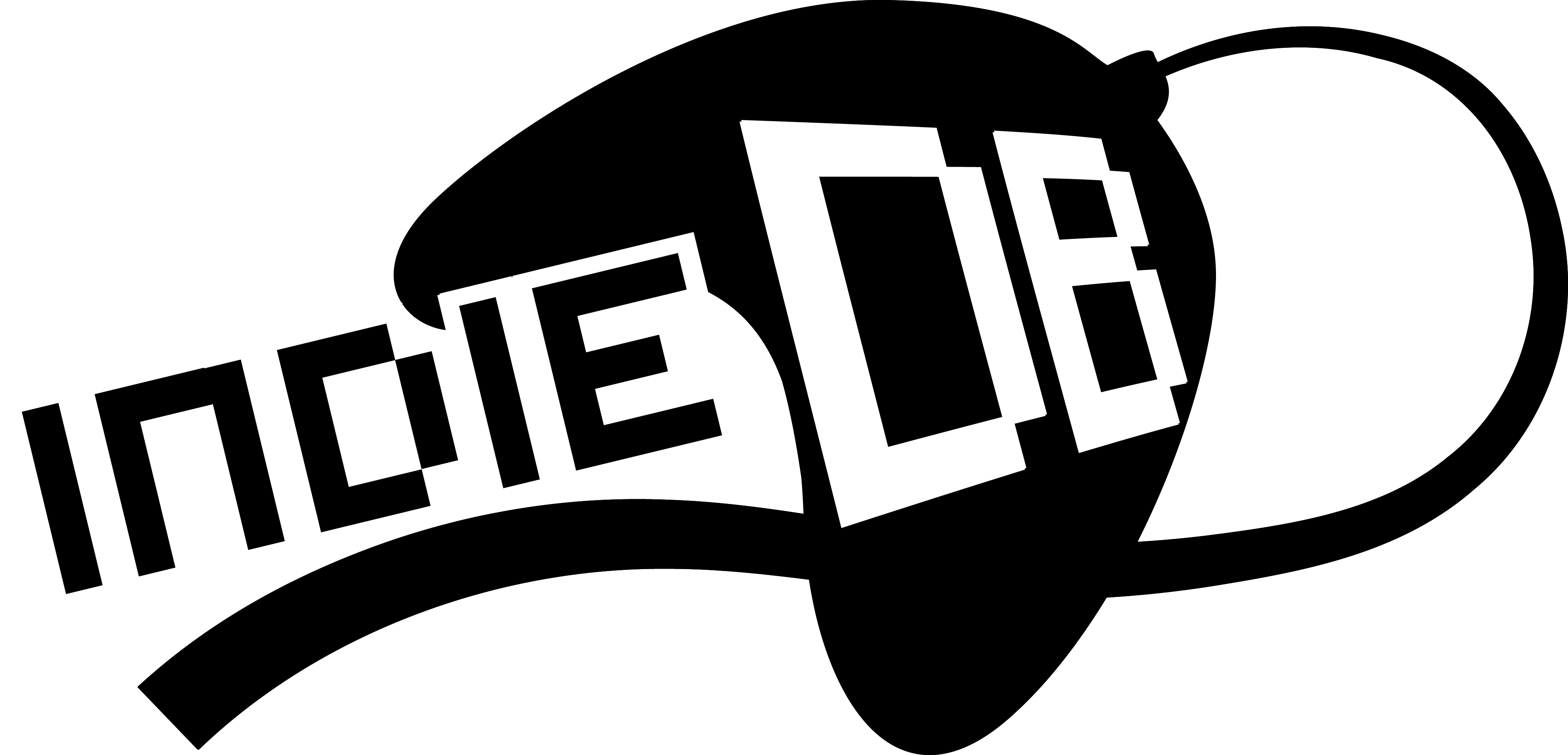
- The IndieDB logo.

IndieDB (/ˈɪndiːdiːbiː/) is an offshoot of ModDB launched in June 2010. It is dedicated to indie gaming and serves as a repository for those games. Like ModDB, the website hosts an annual competition for the best indie game of the year, with the games being voted on in categories and overall. Also like ModDB, the nominees are selected by the site's editors and voted on by its readers. Winners of the Indie of the Year Awards include Minecraft by Mojang in 2010, RimWorld by Ludeon Studios in 2016 and Ion Fury by Voidpoint in 2019.

== See also ==
- Nexus Mods
- List of video game websites
- Steam Workshop
