= Enderal =

Total conversion mod of The Elder Scrolls V: Skyrim

Enderal: The Shards of Order
- Developer: SureAI
- Writer: Nicolas Samuel Lietzau
- Series: The Vyn Series
- Engine: Creation Engine
- Platform: Microsoft Windows
- Release: July 3, 2016
- Genre: Action role-playing
- Mode: Single-player

Enderal: The Shards of Order is a total conversion mod of The Elder Scrolls V: Skyrim developed by SureAI as a sequel to Nehrim: At Fate's Edge. After five years of development, it was released on July 3, 2016, initially in German only. An English version was released August 16, 2016. An expansion, Forgotten Stories, was released on February 14, 2019.

== Plot ==
The player is introduced as a refugee fleeing to Enderal as a stowaway aboard a merchant vessel. Near the journey’s end, the player and their companion are discovered, resulting in the companion being executed and the player thrown overboard into the sea. They awaken on the coast and discover that they possess new and unexplained magical abilities. A mercenary, Jespar Dal'Varek, directs the player to Ark, Enderal's capital, to learn how to control their powers.

The player is revealed to be a 'Prophet': an individual with intense magical ability who can perceive visions of the past and future. They also learn of the Red Madness, a spreading mental epidemic affecting all of Enderal. It is revealed that the Red Madness heralds the approach of the Cleansing, the final stage of an apocalyptic cycle of destruction and rebirth which always causes the dominant civilization of the known world to completely disappear. This cycle is orchestrated by the High Ones, powerful unseen beings who use telepathy to communicate with and taunt the player throughout their journey.

The Prophet is enlisted by the Holy Order, Enderal’s ruling theocracy, to avert the approaching Cleansing. The Order's leader, Grandmaster Tealor Arantheal, tasks the Prophet with uncovering the secrets of the Pyreans, a prior civilization that foresaw the Cleansing but failed to prevent it. Using Pyrean schematics, the Order constructs the Beacon, a magical device believed to be capable of permanently banishing the High Ones. This plan draws the attention of Nehrim, a neighboring nation that views the Cleansing as mankind's ascension; when they learn Arantheal intends to stop it, Nehrim declares war on Enderal.

The Order later discovers that without a way to precisely target the High Ones, activating the Beacon would destroy Enderal. As Nehrimese forces launch a surprise attack on Ark, the Prophet ventures into the underground ruins of the Pyrean capital city to retrieve the Numinos, the essence of a High One, in order to focus the Beacon. They are betrayed at the last moment by Yuslan Sha’Rim, a Nehrimese mage allied with the Order who has succumbed to the Red Madness, and the mission fails. Refusing to concede defeat, Arantheal activates the Beacon without the Numinos, sealing Enderal’s fate.

A ghostly veiled woman then brings the Prophet to the Black Guardian, a human survivor from a prior civilization who attempted to escape the Cleansing by merging himself with a machine. He reveals that the High Ones manipulated events so the Beacon would be built and activated incorrectly, as this is in fact what triggers the Cleansing. Unable to act physically, they exploited Arantheal’s fears and insecurities to compel him to light it without the Numinos. The Prophet also learns they are Fleshless—an artificial recreation of a dead person created by the High Ones to act as their unwitting pawn, and that their original self died when thrown overboard during the voyage.

Returning to the surface, the Prophet finds the Cleansing already underway and must choose between two endings. They may flee to an ancient city in the clouds, surviving while the rest of humanity perishes, in the hope the next civilization in the cycle might overcome the High Ones’ manipulations. Alternatively, they can destroy the Beacon, sacrificing themselves and Enderal to halt the Cleansing and save the wider world. In the Forgotten Stories expansion, a secret ending allows the Prophet to brew an elixir using ingredients from an alternate reality; if they drink it, they survive alongside their companion in a seemingly ideal life. Whether this outcome is real or an illusion induced by the elixir is left ambiguous.

== Development ==
Enderal was in development as a sequel to Nehrim: At Fate's Edge, which was released in 2010, for five years by a team of fourteen. with a release date of July 2016 for the German version and a not confirmed but one-to-two-weeks later for the English version, which was later released in August 2016. It requires the base Skyrim game but not its downloadable content. The mod is fully voiced in both German and English languages.

In December 2016, SureAI announced that Enderal would be getting an expansion pack, Forgotten Stories, to be released in 2017. Forgotten Stories was released on February 14, 2019, features content that was cut from the original release, and is expected to add 10–20 hours of gameplay. This includes two questlines for guilds featured in the original mod, as well as a new secret ending to the main quest. In December 2020, project lead and writer Nicolas Lietzau published his debut novel Dreams of the Dying, the first book of a trilogy that expands the Enderal universe and explores the mercenary past of Jespar Dal'Varek, one of Enderal's main characters.

== Reception and legacy ==
In his review at PC Gamer, Jody Macgregor awarded Enderal a score of 74/100. Macgregor found his 50+ hours spent in game enjoyable, rekindling the joy of discovery found in the base game. He appreciated the game's high standard of writing, and described the voice-acting as "far beyond what you expect from a fan project". In 2017, the project director Nicolas Samuel Lietzau went on to become a writer for the SpellForce game series. In January 2021, SureAI said to move to developing commercial games in patchnote. Dreadful River, an adventure game, was launched in early access in 2022.

== See also ==
- Skyrim modding
