= Online pass =

Digital rights management system

An online pass is a digital rights management system for restricting access to supplemental functionality in a product by using a single-use serial number. Online passes are primarily intended to hinder or discourage the second-hand purchase of a product, and to allow the producer of a product to still return profits from second-hand copies of the product.

These passes were first primarily used by the video game industry, requiring use of a code found in a game's manual or leaflets to access to certain online content, notably online multiplayer. Following criticism of the practice, several major video game publishers, including Electronic Arts and Ubisoft, began phasing out their use in 2013.

A similar tactic has surfaced in the academic textbook industry, regulating use of supplemental material and other online content, with intent to prevent students from obtaining a second-hand or borrowed copy of a needed textbook. This requires them to purchase a new copy in order to use its functionality.

== Video games ==
=== Usage ===
Online passes in video games are intended to counter the popularity of stores such as GameStop, which buy and sell second-hand copies of video games. Online passes are traditionally used to restrict access to a game's multiplayer modes and other online content; they ship as single-use codes printed on inserts packaged with retail copies of video games, and must be redeemed by the user in order to access the multiplayer and online modes of a particular game. If a player does not have an unused online pass (such as when buying a used game), the player can either purchase access via their console or can access a limited trial of the game's online content. In some cases, a game may similarly come with a code that can be redeemed for free downloadable content and other items released upon or shortly after the game's launch, such as The Stone Prisoner DLC and the Blood Dragon armor set for Dragon Age Origins, the House of Valor quest for Kingdoms of Amalur: Reckoning, and a package of 20 additional songs for Rock Band 2.

Alongside downloadable content, online passes add an additional revenue stream which can be used to make up for profits lost through second-hand sales, and encourage players to buy games new at retail so they do not have to pay extra to access the game's full content. Supporters of online passes and publishers using them argue that requiring buyers of used games to pay extra for access to online content and services is a more fair system for paying the costs required to maintain online resources. Opponents contend that adoption of online pass systems may lead to removing more essential functionality from used games and possibly even preventing the resale of video games. 38 Studios founder Curt Schilling justified the use of an online pass to unlock the seven-part bonus quest "House of Valor" on the single-player RPG Kingdoms of Amalur: Reckoning (which was published by EA) as "day one DLC" intended as an incentive for early adopters. However, the decision still provoked discussion on the appropriateness of the model.

=== History ===
Among the first video games to require an online pass was SOCOM U.S. Navy SEALs: Fireteam Bravo 3 for the PlayStation Portable, which required the use of a one-time voucher included in retail copies of the game to access multiplayer modes, charging $20 for replacements. However, in this case, Sony Computer Entertainment stated that this requirement was intended to combat piracy. In late 2009, EA began implementing online passes in its games as part of an initiative known as "Project Ten Dollar"; Mass Effect 2 used an online pass to allow access to bonus content through its "Cerberus Network" system, while Dragon Age Origins came with a code that could be redeemed to download its first major DLC release, The Stone Prisoner, for free, as well as an exclusive armor set. In May 2010, EA announced that beginning with Tiger Woods PGA Tour 10, all future EA Sports titles would require the use of online passes to access multiplayer.

In mid-2013, publishers began to phase out online passes; in May 2013, Electronic Arts announced it would, due to customer feedback, discontinue its future use of online passes in upcoming titles, and retroactively remove the online pass requirements from existing titles. In June 2013, Sony announced that it would prohibit online passes on the upcoming PlayStation 4 due to the new PlayStation Plus subscription requirement for online multiplayer. On November 1, 2013, Ubisoft followed suit by discontinuing its Uplay Passport system for future titles, and making the pass for its recently released Assassin’s Creed IV: Black Flag available at no charge. A Ubisoft spokesperson stated that the system was "no longer the best approach for ensuring that all our customers have the best possible experience with all facets of our games", noting that Black Flag's single-player campaign contained passive online features that would be otherwise unavailable without activating the pass.

== Textbooks ==
A similar system has been recently used by textbook publishers, by requiring the use of an online pass to offer supplemental content; including an online message board, an assignment system where homework may be assigned or handed in, or even an e-book version of the title. It is similarly intended to discourage the second-hand re-sale or sharing of these textbooks by only allowing their online functionality to be utilized by a single student; requiring others to buy their own copy of the book or obtain an access code individually.

== See also ==
- Digital rights management
