= Tower of Guns =

2014 video game

- Developer: Terrible Posture Games
- Publishers: Terrible Posture Games (2014); Grip Digital (2015; consoles)
- Director: Joe Mirabello
- Composer: Mike Mirabello
- Engine: Unreal Engine 3
- Platforms: Microsoft Windows; Linux; OS X PlayStation 3 PlayStation 4 Xbox One
- Release: Windows; March 4, 2014; Linux, OS X; October 28, 2014; PlayStation 3, PlayStation 4; NA: April 7, 2015; PAL: April 8, 2015; Xbox One; April 10, 2015
- Genre: First-person shooter
- Mode: Single-player

Tower of Guns is a roguelike single-player first-person shooter video game developed by Terrible Posture Games and published by Grip Digital. It features procedurally generated levels, making each playthrough unique. The game was released on March 4, 2014, to generally positive reviews, and later released on PS4 and Xbox One in April 2015.

== Gameplay ==
Tower of Guns is a first-person shooter that takes place in a tower filled with a variety of guns. The player must ascend the tower by advancing through a series of randomized areas. Each area contains a number of arenas and a boss fight that the player must clear to advance. At the beginning of every run, one of several "stories" is selected at random, ranging from a soldier ordered by his superiors to climb the Tower of Guns, to a gun-toting barbarian guide protecting an evil priest on his way to a dark ritual at the top of the tower, to an "inebriated scholar" trying to get to a friend's home who has confused the Tower of Guns for his friend's apartment building. Aside from on-screen text appearing at the beginning and ending of every level, these stories do not impact the gameplay in any significant way, and can in fact be toggled off at the beginning of a run.

At the outset of a run, the player may choose one gun and one perk before they enter the Tower of Guns. The tower is filled with randomly placed robots and sentry turrets that fire projectiles at the player. These projectiles can produce a variety of effects, such as area of effect damage, fire damage, or launching the player into the air. When an enemy is destroyed, blue tokens are produced that the player can pick up to increase their gun's level. The tower contains various power-ups that alter gameplay and upgradable guns that the player can unlock.

The game is intended to be completed within one to two hours, and has been described as a "lunch-break experience".

== Development ==
Joe Mirabello, the founder and sole member of Terrible Posture Games, began production on Tower of Guns after the collapse of 38 Studios, where he had been working on Project Copernicus, an unreleased massively multiplayer online game based on Kingdoms of Amalur. Mirabello said that "after working on a game with hundreds of people made for thousands of people, I wanted to work on a single-player game made by just one person". A pre-alpha version of the game debuted at IndieCade booth at the 2013 Electronic Entertainment Expo.

The completed build of the game was released on March 4, 2014, through a number of online clients, including Steam, GOG.com, GamersGate and IndieGameStand.

== Reception ==
Reception

Aggregate scores
Aggregator	Score
Metacritic	PC: 76/100; PS4: 69/100; XONE: 71/100
OpenCritic	69% 24% Critics Recommend

Review scores
Publication	Score
Destructoid	85/100
Game Informer	7.75/10
GameSpot	8/10
Push Square	6/10

The game received "generally favorable" reviews on the review aggregation website Metacritic. 24% of critics recommend the game on OpenCritic.
