= 3 out of 10 =

2020 episodic video game

- Developer: Terrible Posture Games
- Publisher: Terrible Posture Games
- Directors: Joe Mirabello; Chris Zukowski
- Composer: Mike Mirabello
- Engine: Unreal Engine 4
- Platforms: Windows, Xbox One, Xbox Series X/S, Nintendo Switch
- Release: Season 1: Windows; WW: August 6, 2020 Xbox One, Xbox Series X/S, Nintendo Switch; WW: March 3, 2021; Season 2: Windows; WW: April 8, 2021

3 out of 10 is a 2020 episodic graphic adventure game created and developed by Terrible Posture Games that is designed as the world's "first playable sitcom" about a group of developers struggling to make a game from their company, Shovelworks Studios. In the game's story, Shovelwork Studios is the worst video game studio in the world and has never made a game that scores higher than a "3 out of 10" before, but they still try.

The game was released on PC by August 6, 2020, on season 1 around 5 episodes for five weeks to September 3, then later released on Xbox One, Xbox Series X/S and Nintendo Switch on March 3, 2021. Season 2 was released on April 8, 2021.

== Gameplay ==
The game is described as "part animated show, part game" which combines a single, overarching narrative with genre-bending minigames. Players control an animator, Midge Potters, who must adjust her life with her new colleagues as they create an endless runner called Surfing with Sharks, with the unique gimmick that it has an end.

== Episodes ==
Season	Episodes	Originally released	
Season	Episodes	First released	Last released
1	5	August 6, 2020	September 3, 2020
2	5	April 8, 2021	

=== Season 1 (2020) ===
Title	Original release date
"Episode 1: Welcome to Shovelworks"	August 6, 2020
Midge, a new animator hired a week after their lead animator, Javier, spontaneously exploded for no reason, arrives at the studio somewhere in New England. A genetic group of mobile fan-protesters from the New England chapter of the Global Internet Fandom Coalition are outside due to the game trailer that the studio made for their game "Surfing With Sharks", an endless runner that actually has an end, which the lead designer, Kevin, calls an "Endful Runner". The shark is a great white shark, but Kevin makes it a tiger shark in the script for the trailer. The devs try feeding the crowd a concoction with granola, ketchup, and hot sauce. This causes them to end up with a "2 out of 10" on their meter, leading to a code red lockdown. To save their studio from the protesters as a last resort, Midge is tasked to get an intern inside a pet crate and put it in a dumbwaiter to feed to the engineers to make a distraction trick at the protesters to leave. The rating system returns to a 3 out of 10 as Midge almost quits her job before getting a call from Mr. Umbrella.
"Episode 2: Foundation 101"	August 13, 2020
Francine, the HR administrator, gets a "wall of interns" surrounding her in her workspace. Midge decided to take them back to the college they were from at the Center of the Institute to the Academy of Higher University of Games (CIAHUG), a for-profit school run by administrator Provost West. Recruiting Ben, a game artist, and Viper, lead character artist, they drive to the university in a van with the interns stacked as a wobbling tower. When they arrived, they have to outrun West's ex-military grade recruiting robot agent, Recuitus Maximus, as well. Ben and Viper managed to escape with the intern while the rest try to put the interns in classrooms on campus. However, Midge finds a secret room behind a painting from opening a head bust of West, leading her, Kevin and Pylon, the technical artist, to an Intern packing plant. Ben and Viper finds a Faculty-Only room of workers chained up and hanging as West locks them up inside. The Intern outside helps them to get the keys to the door. Midge finds a memo around Phase 2 in CIAHUG, but it's only ripped in six pieces. Pylon managed to find the missing five pieces and reveals that CIAHUG is planning to rent the interns out as cubicles. West arrives to stop them with her robot agent, but Viper throws the intern at it to replace the head and destroying it into pieces. West sends all of her robots at them as Viper fights them off with his bat, hitting interns at them to snotkick the robots in 5 waves. West was defeated as Frank, Ben's old friend, makes some changes to the college to take the interns away. However, they keep one intern to put in the supply closet back at the studio.
"Episode 3: Pivot Like a Champion"	August 20, 2020
As the team celebrates Surfing with Sharks being halfway through development, Jeb, the CEO, decided that he wants to turn the game into a battle royale game. The team cannot agree on what to do, so they themselves do pivoted the game with a "battle royale" using foam dart guns. Kevin and Midge divide the workers into teams; Plyon and Ben on Open-World-Survival, Kevin and Viper on Battle Royale, Joan on art direction after its original art director Jess was gone for seven years, and Francine on adding MOBA elements to the game. Midge and Timothy 3000, an automated office assistant, are on team Do Nothing. However, during the end of the battle, Viper managed to defeat Jeb who joined in after all the other teams are taken down. Joan wins to reach to Jeb and propose her pivot idea to him about the art direction of the game with Otters.
"Episode 4: Thank You for Being an Asset to Our Company"	August 27, 2020
After playing a new build of the game with the shark now in a shiny next-gen 3D model, Francine is asked by Jeb to make the office look "better" for an upcoming investor meeting in two days. However, she buys too much at a low price at Cheap Random Assets and Provisions. Ben and Joan tried to calm Francine down while Kevin, Pylon and Midge try to look for the hacker who changed the shark in their game by checking the backup system of the change log from the engineers. However, without Interns to fed them, they decide to give them coffee instead. Kevin and Pylon sends Midge to talk with the Lead Engineer while getting them some chai latte. However, Midge finds out that she thinks she's the one who changed the shark. When Joan knocked Ben out with a living T-posing manquinn of Yorick and take him back to the studio, Ben wakes up and finds the studio decorated by Francine's work. Ben tasked Kevin and Pylon to help him stop Francine and Joan from decorating the studio. However, Francine brought some Mannequins, similar to the default character from Unreal Engine, to take over the office and lock the boys in the supply closet. Unfortunately, they betrayed Francine to lock her up with them and Joan inside the closet. Viper uses a flamethrower on them, causing a fire in the studio and forcing Jeb to cancel the upcoming investor meeting. However, the rating goes up to 4 out of 10 after the chaos.
"Episode 5: The Rig is Up"	September 3, 2020
Pylon wakes up to his face being missing, due to a graphical glitch. He tries to go to the local hospital, but they cannot help him. However, Doctor IK, a mad scientist, can help Pylon with his problem but he and Kevin tried to go to a hospital in Canada by taking the sewers. When they arrived, the doctors kick him out for switching the lowest number to get in. He then goes back to Doctor IK who used a device similar to a pinball machine to cure Pylon's face from Terminal Rigor Borkus. Midge meets up with Mr. Umbrella in a secret location who reveals he's part of a secret organization that blackmails her to make the game better or she loses Mr. Snuffles. He also thinks the new shark model in the game is her handiwork, but Midge declines this since she is now the new employee at Shovelworks. The game keeps improving later on with the surfer guy getting a rocket launcher. The episode ends with Midge breaking into Shovelworks Studios at night.

=== Season 2 (2021) ===
Title	Original release date
"Episode 1: The Kevin Effect"	April 8, 2021
When Kevin discovers that his computer was stolen, Midge and Pylon decide to go look for it while Kevin starts drinking coffee using Francine's new coffee machine, much to her dismay. Kevin starts teleporting around, causing to have multiple Kevins to help him get the game a 10 out of 10, a game developer formula known as "The Kevin Effect" which only reduce their rating back down to 3 out of 10. Francine managed to destroy the coffee machine and breaks Kevin's addiction to caffeine, causing the team to ban him from drinking anymore coffee-related drinks. Meanwhile, Pylon and Midge find the missing computer in a walk-in fridge, but Pylon accidentally slips on some butter and throws it into the air, causing it to get shredded by the fans. Pylon then tell Midge that they will "deny all knowledge of the case". To replace Kevin's computer, they used the CEO's computer as a replacement while fooling Jeb of his computer made of Butter.
"Episode 2: Green Screens and Hammers"	April 8, 2021
After Kevin is banned from drinking Coffee, he started to get a "hammer" headache while Pylon decides to turn the meeting room into a motion capture studio using Motion Capture Emerald paint and makes a computer to capture Ben's movement for the game. However, the computer used to control it becomes self-aware and instead of taking over the world or enslaving humanity, he mugs the team with knife-wielding drones to get out and head to Philly. One night after, Plyon discovers at the studio that "Midge" was making the changes to the game including a sewer level, but he's unaware of the Intern doing all the changes.
"Episode 3: Welcome to the Club"	April 8, 2021
A nightclub, known as The Legion, opens outside of the studio. Viper is let in, but Midge, Kevin and Plyon have to sneak in, only to find out that the club is recruiting for an army on money. After trying to warn Viper about the club, the guards managed to capture them as the nightclub owner threatens to rip out the characters' larynxes. However, Joan challenges her to play a rhythm game involving cows on the dance floor in order to win and get the workers out. She wins and gets them back while winning the credit game card, much to Viper's agony.
"Episode 4: Catapults and Conspiracies"	April 8, 2021
The team finds out that someone sabotaged their router, causing their network to go down. Unaware of Midge destroying it, Jeb thinks it was sabotaged by a rival studio known as Blood Diamond Studios, known for making World of Catapults which was Jeb's idea. He has Ben, along with Kevin, Joan and the Intern to go to the rival studio and give its CEO a message "Jeb remembers everything". However, things don't go according to plan.
"Episode 5: It's Fun O'Clock Somewhere"	April 8, 2021
To boost morale for the company, Jeb decides to have a "day of fun" by having yoga praticce, exploding ball kicking, and a hotdog-eating contest which Pylon thinks that his liver was damaged from eating too much. Jeb also turned the office into a giant ball pit, but the tentacle living in their fridge, Sally, has laid eggs everywhere. At the end, Javier's voice is apparently heard through a vent in a secret room at the studio founded by Ben and Joan, suggesting that he either did not explode (i.e. the blood on his desk was not even real), or he somehow returned to life.

== Development ==
Joe Mirabello, creative director of Terrible Posture Games, wanted to develop a new game aside from their first person shooters Tower of Guns and Mothergunship. The inspiration for 3 out of 10 came from his odd experiences working at 38 Studios who developed Kingdoms of Amalur: Reckoning, but the game Joe's making doesn't punch down on the industry, rather highlighting the absurdity of it. The sitcom style of the game was also inspired from shows on Adult Swim and Comedy Central with cues taken from classical 2D adventure games like Grim Fandango and The Secret of Monkey Island.

== Planned TV Adaptation ==
In May 2021, dj2 Entertainment (currently as Story Kitchen) announced a partnership with Terrible Posture Games to make an TV adaptation based on their game. However, no news about the adaptation as it was either scrapped or on hold during production.

== Reception ==
Reviews for Season 1

Aggregate scores
Aggregator	Score
Metacritic	PC: 85/100; NS: 73/100
OpenCritic	43% recommend

Reviews for Season 2

Aggregate scores
Aggregator	Score
Metacritic	PC: 79/100
OpenCritic	83%

While Season 1 received "mixed to average reviews", Season 2 received "generally favorable reviews" according to review aggregator website Metacritic. 43% of critics recommend Season 1 on OpenCritic.

Hardcore Gamer gave some positive reviews on the game with Season 1 being a nice surprise for dropping a new episode every week for five weeks while Season 2 becomes more smart, funny and entertaining from start to finish, even when it doesn't feel recognizable when the studio holds things together, even when eveything inside and out of the game tries to go off the rails.
