= Battle Train =

2025 video game

- Developers: Terrible Posture Games; Nerd Ninjas
- Publisher: Bandai Namco Entertainment
- Engine: Unreal Engine 4
- Platforms: Nintendo Switch; Windows
- Release: June 18, 2025
- Genre: Deck-building
- Mode: Single-player

Battle Train is a deck-building rogue indie game developed by Terrible Posture Games and Nerd Ninjas and published from Bandai Namco Entertainment. The game sets as a chaotic game show where players must build the tracks on the field and ram their trains into their targets, and using the same animation structure as their previous game 3 out of 10.

The game was released on June 18, 2025, for the Nintendo Switch and Windows and has received "mixed or average" reviews.

== Gameplay and premise ==
The game opens up with the player selecting a contestant in a game show, named Battle Train, where you have to compete against characters for a chance to become the Supreme President Conductor of the show against their top champion Aalvado, the Duke of Demolition. Players can customize their Battle Trains between their cabs, engines, prow and wheels. Once the match starts, players select the most beneficial weapon or track from the cards given to them and to ram it into their enemies or shape the track how they like it. During the story mode of the game, the cutscenes show the backstage of the characters and enemies you have to face, and all stylized and played out similar to how the studio constucted their last game 3 out of 10, utilizing 2D animated characters in graphic backgrounds.

== Development and release ==
On October 1, 2024, Terrible Posture Games opened a Kickstarter to their next game Battle Train and ended on October 22 with reached over 213% funded to the studio to self-publish it with Nerd Ninjas. However, it was announced that the game will be released on June 18, 2025, and published by Bandai Namco. Following the game's release, a DLC titled Revenge of the Puffin was attached to be release on September 4, 2025, with new content, revealing Aalvado's origins, and challenges on the icy track.

== Reception ==
Reception

Aggregate scores
Aggregator	Score
Metacritic	PC: 72/100; NS: 72/100
OpenCritic	53% recommended

Review scores
Publication	Score
Nintendo World Report	7.5/10
Shacknews	7/10

Battle Train received "mixed or average" reviews based on 7 critic reviews according to review aggregator website Metacritic. 53% of critics recommended Battle Train on OpenCritic.

TheGamer gave Battle Train an 2.5 out of 5, praising for the track building as a great roguelike deck-building theme but finds the story uninteresting and the story scenes a slow behind on the progression for the players.
