= 10/3 =

10/3 may refer to:

- October 3 (month-day date notation)
- March 10 (day-month date notation)
- 10 shillings and 3 pence in UK predecimal currency
- The decagram

== See also ==
- 103 (disambiguation)
- 3/10 (disambiguation)
