= Project Copernicus =

Canceled video game

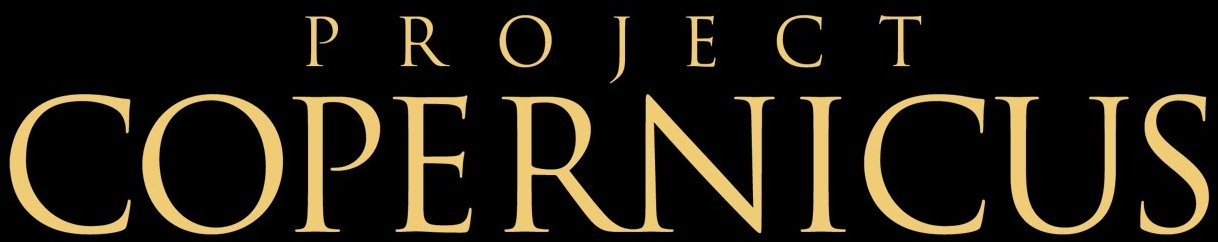
- Working title logo
- Developer: 38 Studios
- Director: Steve Danuser
- Designer: Travis McGeathy
- Artists: Todd McFarlane; Thom Ang
- Writer: R. A. Salvatore
- Composers: Aubrey Hodges; Duncan Watt; Gene Rozenberg
- Engine: Unreal Engine 3
- Release: Canceled
- Genre: Massively multiplayer online role-playing game
- Mode: Multiplayer

Project Copernicus was a canceled massively multiplayer online role-playing game (MMORPG) that was in development at 38 Studios. The project was created by studio founder Curt Schilling, with writer R. A. Salvatore and artist Todd McFarlane being deeply involved in its development. Other notable staff included creative director Steve Danuser, art director Thom Ang, and co-composer Aubrey Hodges.

The game was set in Amalur, a fantasy universe shared with Kingdoms of Amalur: Reckoning (2012), a game in development at Big Huge Games from 2009. The storyline would have seen the world's races, having achieved immortality through a device dubbed the Well of Souls, banding together to defeat a great evil. Developer comments compared the gameplay to World of Warcraft, and participation would have been based on a free-to-play model.

Project Copernicus was first mentioned in 2006 when 38 Studios was founded, initially planned for a 2011 release. The game was teased with artwork and a short trailer released in May 2012, but production ceased that same year following the studio's bankruptcy. Reactions to its cancellation were varied from employees, associated parties, and journalists covering the incident. Its overly high ambitions and place within the changing MMO market were noted. In 2018, the assets of Project Copernicus were acquired by THQ Nordic along with the Amalur intellectual property.

== Overview ==
Promotional screenshot

Project Copernicus was a massively multiplayer online role-playing game (MMORPG) set in the fantasy world of Amalur, a world subject to a cycle of death and rebirth. One staff member later described Amalur as a version of Earth in a "post-apocalyptic magical future". Players would have influenced the story, with different servers potentially having different versions of the world after a key narrative choice.

Players would have inhabited a member of one of four playable races − humans, elves, gnomes, and ogres − and explored different environments, accepting quests and fighting enemies. The team aimed for a large environment that players could explore in its entirety, including large-scale landmarks. The gameplay was internally compared to World of Warcraft, with a focus on exploration, real-time combat using multiple abilities, and character classes and traits.

Project Copernicus was planned to use a free-to-play model, a growing industry trend at the time. While the base game would have been free, microtransactions would have been incorporated offering optional perks and items to players such as cosmetic armor sets, house furnishings, and in-game pets. Chat functions were also planned, with the concept of using different fonts to distinguish the player races. The final name and target platforms were to be announced later.

== Production ==
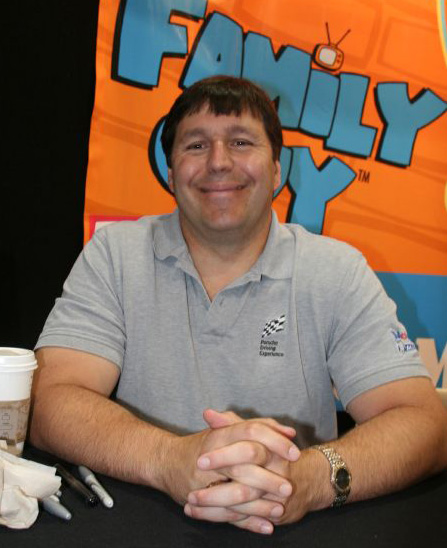
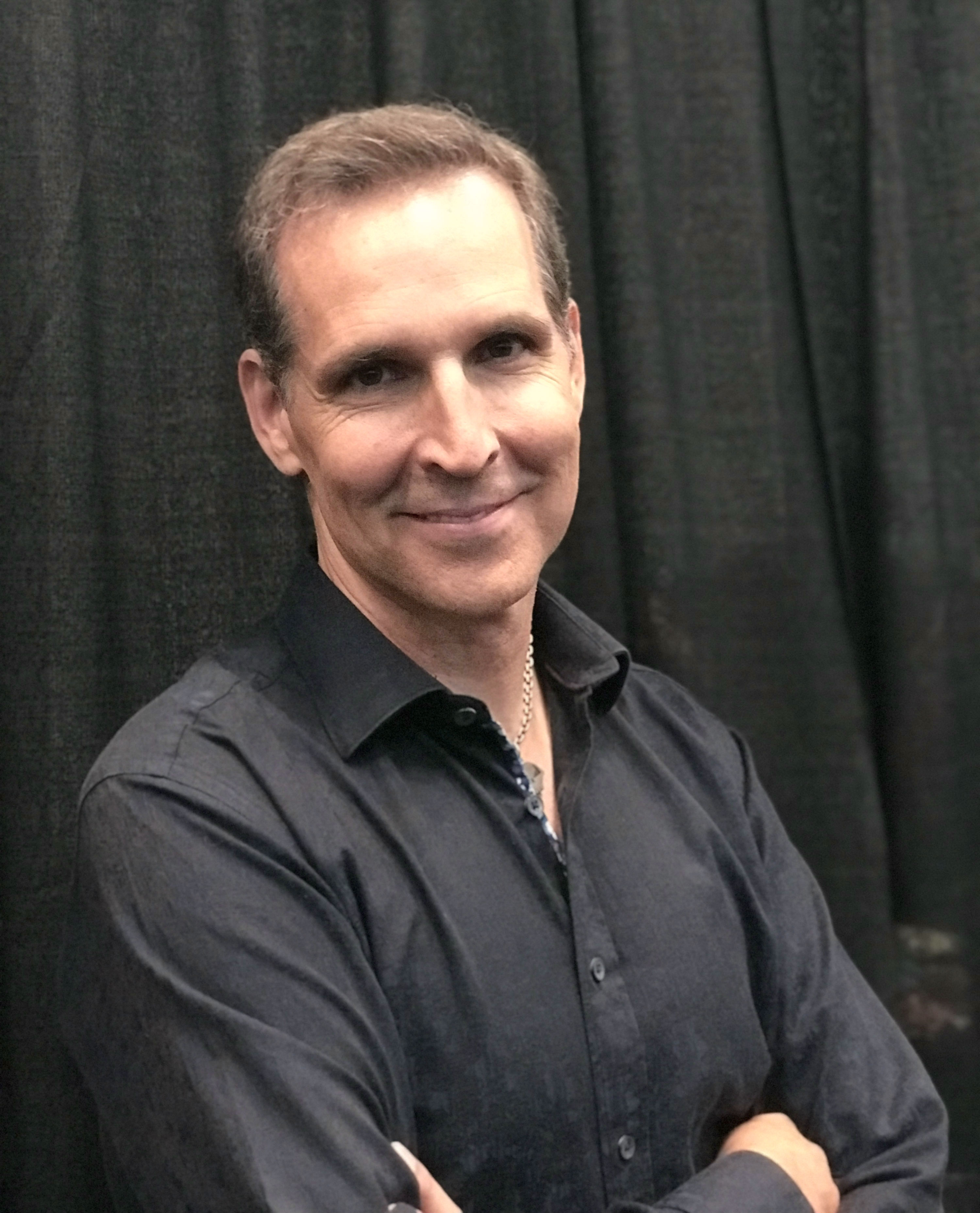
The Amalur universe was created by writer R. A. Salvatore (left) and artist Todd McFarlane (right); both were deeply involved in Project Copernicus.

Project Copernicus was being produced by 38 Studios, a studio founded by Curt Schilling in 2006 as Green Monster Games. Schilling, a former baseball player and avid gamer, wanted to create an MMORPG based on a new intellectual property (IP). He partnered with writer R. A. Salvatore and artist Todd McFarlane to create the Amalur universe, which would provide the basis for Project Copernicus. The game was intended to be a market rival to World of Warcraft, aiming for a "deeper" narrative and distinct art style. Its world and lore would be the basis for a multimedia franchise. Project Copernicus was initially scheduled to be released in 2011, with 38 Studios projecting annual profits of over $100 million from its revenue.

Schilling wanted to gather high-profile game developers for the production, with it later being compared to gathering a "super star" group. Creative director Steve Danuser previously served as a designer and community manager for EverQuest II. The lead designer was Travis McGeathy, who had served in that role on the original EverQuest. 38 Studios' art director Thom Ang shared duties with McFarlane. The user interface (UI) was being designed by Irena Pereira, known for her work on World of Warcraft and its expansions The Burning Crusade and Wrath of the Lich King. A team of three composers−Aubrey Hodges, Duncan Watt, and Gene Rozenberg−were working on the music and sound design. Hodges was known for his work on the King's Quest series, Watt had previously been the lead composer of League of Legends, and Rozenberg had composed for a variety of games and went on to work on The Witcher 3: Wild Hunt.

Early concept art was noted for a lack of corners and angles, a conscious artistic and technical choice by Ang to set it apart from other similar games. Pereira described the universe's visual identity as inspired by ancient texts and historical drawings. The original logo was based on the Ouroboros symbol, tying into the game's themes of death and rebirth, but it was dropped due to similarities with the logo of The Elder Scrolls Online. Salvatore created the 10,000 years of backstory and history for the Amalur setting with some friends in a Dungeons & Dragons group, and he worked with McFarlane to ensure his art design matched the story. Salvatore insisted on the backstory's large scope, wanting a cohesive and compelling setting. The game's story, which had a planned four-year arc, would have focused on different factions within Amalur banding together to fight a common enemy. A central theme was the social and psychological effects of the Well of Souls, an artifact that grants immortality to Amalur's population. Schilling had been eager to include centaurs as a playable race, but they were left out due to their added workload.

Schilling sought to develop a large-scale title in the MMO genre, although he noted in 2009 that it might have been easier to design in another genre. He encountered difficulties finding investors for the company and game, using much of his fortune alongside smaller loans. In late 2010, 38 Studios negotiated an agreement with the state of Rhode Island in which the company secured a $75 million loan in exchange for moving to the region to help grow the local tech industry. The agreement and move were completed in early 2011. Project Copernicus was being built using Unreal Engine 3, while the BigWorld middleware tools were licensed for development. For voice chat and related communications both in-game and within the company, they licensed software from Vivox.

== Announcement and cancellation ==
The game was first mentioned alongside the studio's founding and teased through concept art at the 2008 San Diego Comic-Con. The name Project Copernicus was used as a working title with the intention to keep details sparse until the game was close to release. The MMO was intended to be the first Amalur release, but after 38 Studios acquired Big Huge Games in 2009 with a promising game prototype, the release order was switched and Big Huge Games' project was released as an introduction to the world. This title, the action role-playing game Kingdoms of Amalur: Reckoning, was co-published in February 2012 by 38 Studios and Electronic Arts. In later interviews, Salvatore described Reckoning as specifically showing the origins for the Well of Souls, which appeared in both projects, and being developed independently of Project Copernicus.

Schilling faulted the slow production and missed deadlines of Project Copernicus, saying that ultimately the gameplay "wasn't fun". An anonymous employee later countered this, saying a small playtest group within the company was enjoying their time in-game, but participation was limited due to the difficulty accessing private servers. By May 2012, the projected release for Project Copernicus was estimated as June 2013. In February 2013, McFarlane described the project as being close to completion. According to developer statements and later official descriptions, the selectable character races were finished, zones playable, and basic zone storylines completed. 38 Studios' chief operating officer, William Thomas, described the project as 75% complete.

Following the release of Reckoning, which failed to break even in sales, 38 Studios was struggling financially. In May 2012, the studio defaulted on a loan repayment instalment to Rhode Island. Publicity was exacerbated by hostile comments from the state's new governor, Lincoln Chafee, regarding the loan. 38 Studios staff blamed this negative publicity for a lack of interest from outside publishers, which might have secured more funds. Several approaches were made by Schilling to Sony Online Entertainment president John Smedley about selling the project, but Smedley turned it down as "[economically] too tough to make work for us". During May and June 2012, 38 Studios let go of almost all employees without warning, halted game development, and filed for Chapter 7 bankruptcy. Company assets, including the Amalur IP, were taken over by the Rhode Island government.

== Aftermath and reactions ==
Multiple employees were shocked and demoralized leading up to and following the closure, as the company had fostered a strong team spirit and they were deeply attached to Project Copernicus. A trailer was put together during the last few weeks of the company's life by staff eager to show their work, garnering a standing ovation from employees. The trailer was published online on May 18, 2012, less than two weeks before the studio's closure. Further leaked videos of Project Copernicus following 38 Studios' closure included pre-alpha footage of the character creator and in-game navigation, and several employees mentioned details related to its setting and mechanics in interviews and online posts.

Salvatore, while he held no grudges against the game's collapse, felt Project Copernicus had failed due to a changing market and budget overrun. Speaking in 2013, McFarlane held out hope another company would resurrect the game. A 2012 feature by Gamasutra on defining events in gaming that year mentioned Project Copernicus as "a reminder of just how expensive and risky a triple-A MMO is in our rapidly evolving climate". In a 2021 list of unreleased MMOs, Steven Messner of PC Gamer noted that the project had the potential to be a good entry in the genre despite little concrete gameplay information, but that despite not being officially canceled, it was unlikely to see release. Brendan Sinclair, writing for GamesIndustry.biz in 2022, highlighted Project Copernicus and 38 Studios as a cautionary tale of over-ambition and an example of bad employer practices within the gaming industry.

The Amalur IP and associated projects were put up for auction by Rhode Island alongside the rest of 38 Studios' assets in December 2013. Despite early interest, the Amalur lots were not sold during the auction. Subsequently, Jeff Easley was described as the studio's only remaining employee, tasked with keeping the technical aspects of Project Copernicus running until a buyer could be found. In September 2018, the Amalur rights and properties were acquired by THQ Nordic.

Despite having turned down Schilling's offer, Smedley lauded the design and art of Project Copernicus. Lars Buttler, chief executive officer of Trion Worlds, blamed the project's failure and by extension the studio's collapse on an overambitious scope for a first-time developer. Michael Pachter, a financial analyst for Wedbush Securities, was skeptical about the Amalur IP finding funding given the market at the time. Speaking about the MMO in relation to 38 Studios and the initial failure to sell the IP, Chafee called it "a lot of junk", which Schilling countered hostilely on social media. Smedley, Buttler, and Pachter each noted the changing video game market at the time was not suitable for new MMOs, with Buttler and Pachter specifically highlighting the subscriber slump of Star Wars: The Old Republic after its launch.
