= 103 =

103 may refer to:

- 103 (number), the natural number following 102 and preceding 104
- AD 103, a year in the 2nd century AD
- 103 BC, a year in the 2nd century BC
- 103 (Tyne Electrical Engineers) Field Squadron, a territorial regiment
- 103 (Newcastle) Field Squadron, Royal Engineers
- 103 (Lancashire Artillery Volunteers) Regiment Royal Artillery
- 103 series Japanese rolling stock
- 103, a development name for the Tupolev Tu-2
- 103 Hera, a main-belt asteroid
- DB Class 103, a class of electric locomotives in Germany

== See also ==
- 10/3 (disambiguation)
- Lawrencium, chemical element with atomic number 103
