= 3/10 =

3/10 may refer to:

- March 10 (month-day date notation)
- October 3 (day-month date notation)
- 3rd Battalion, 10th Marines, an artillery battalion of the United States Marine Corps
- 3 out of 10, a 2020 graphic adventure game
