= Curt Schilling =

American baseball player (born 1966)

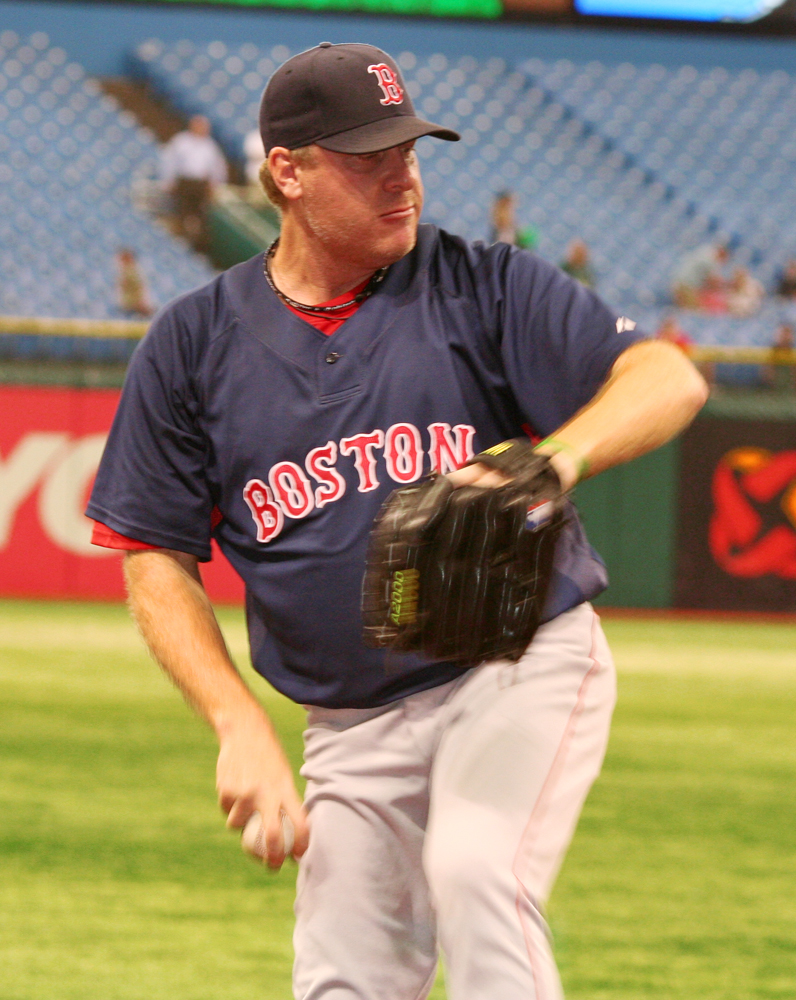
- Schilling with the Boston Red Sox in 2007
- Pitcher
- Born: November 14, 1966 (age 60); Anchorage, Alaska, U.S.
- Batted: Right Threw: Right

MLB debut
- September 7, 1988, for the Baltimore Orioles

Last MLB appearance
- September 25, 2007, for the Boston Red Sox

MLB statistics
- Win–loss record: 216–146
- Earned run average: 3.46
- Strikeouts: 3,116
- Stats at Baseball Reference

Teams
- Baltimore Orioles (1988–1990); Houston Astros (1991); Philadelphia Phillies (1992–2000); Arizona Diamondbacks (2000–2003); Boston Red Sox (2004–2007)

Career highlights and awards
- 6× All-Star (1997–1999, 2001, 2002, 2004); 3× World Series champion (2001, 2004, 2007); World Series MVP (2001); NLCS MVP (1993); Roberto Clemente Award (2001); 2× MLB wins leader (2001, 2004); 2× NL strikeout leader (1997, 1998); Philadelphia Phillies Wall of Fame; Boston Red Sox Hall of Fame

Curtis Montague Schilling (born November 14, 1966) is an American former Major League Baseball right handed pitcher and commentator for media outlet BlazeTV. He helped lead the Philadelphia Phillies to a World Series appearance in 1993 and won championships in 2001 with the Arizona Diamondbacks and in 2004 and 2007 with the Boston Red Sox, being named a co-winner of the World Series MVP in 2001. Schilling retired with a career postseason record of 11–2 and his .846 postseason winning percentage is a major-league record among pitchers with at least ten decisions. He is a member of the 3,000 strikeout club and has the highest strikeout-to-walk ratio of any of its inactive members. He is tied at third place for the most 300-strikeout seasons.

After retiring, Schilling founded Green Monster Games, which was renamed 38 Studios. In 2012, the company released Kingdoms of Amalur: Reckoning in February, laid off the entire staff in May, then declared bankruptcy in June. As a conservative radio personality, Schilling was signed by the Howie Carr radio network to do a Saturday morning politics and sports show and joined Breitbart in 2016.

== Early life ==
Curtis Montague Schilling was born on November 14, 1966, in Anchorage, Alaska, to Mary and Cliff Schilling. His father was a master sergeant with the 101st Airborne Division and stationed at Elmendorf Air Force Base near Anchorage at the time. Curt Schilling was the middle of three children. He attended Shadow Mountain High School in Phoenix, Arizona.

== College career ==
Schilling attended Yavapai College in Prescott, Arizona, in 1985.

== Professional career ==
=== Draft and minor leagues ===
Schilling began his professional career in the Boston Red Sox farm system as a second-round pick in what would be MLB's final January draft. He began his professional career with the Elmira Pioneers, then a Red Sox minor-league affiliate.

After beginning 1988 with an 8–4 record and a 2.97 earned run average in 21 games with the New Britain Red Sox, he was traded along with Brady Anderson to the Baltimore Orioles for Mike Boddicker on July 29, two days prior to the trade deadline.

=== Baltimore Orioles (1988–1990) ===
Schilling allowed three runs in seven innings as the starter in a 4–3 win over the Red Sox in his MLB debut at Memorial Stadium on September 7, 1988. Orioles manager Frank Robinson said of Schilling's performance, "He showed he doesn't get rattled out there." He was the losing pitcher in each of his remaining three starts of 1988, including a season-ending 9–3 defeat to the Toronto Blue Jays at Exhibition Stadium on October 2.

Schilling earned both his first save and win in 1990. The save was the result of not allowing a run in the last 2 1/3 innings of a 6–2 victory over the Minnesota Twins at the Metrodome which was his first Orioles appearance of the year on June 29. The win came two weeks later when he pitched two shutout innings in relief in a 7–5 home triumph over the Kansas City Royals on July 11. Working exclusively out of the bullpen, he finished the season with a 1–2 record and a 2.54 ERA.

=== Houston Astros (1991) ===
In a transaction considered by Orioles fans as the worst in team history according to Thom Loverro, Schilling was dealt along with Steve Finley and Pete Harnisch to the Houston Astros for Glenn Davis on January 10, 1991. He joined an Astros organization that was for sale and lightening its payroll by going with younger, inexpensive players.

Schilling was traded to the Philadelphia Phillies for pitcher Jason Grimsley on April 2, 1992.

=== Philadelphia Phillies (1992–2000) ===
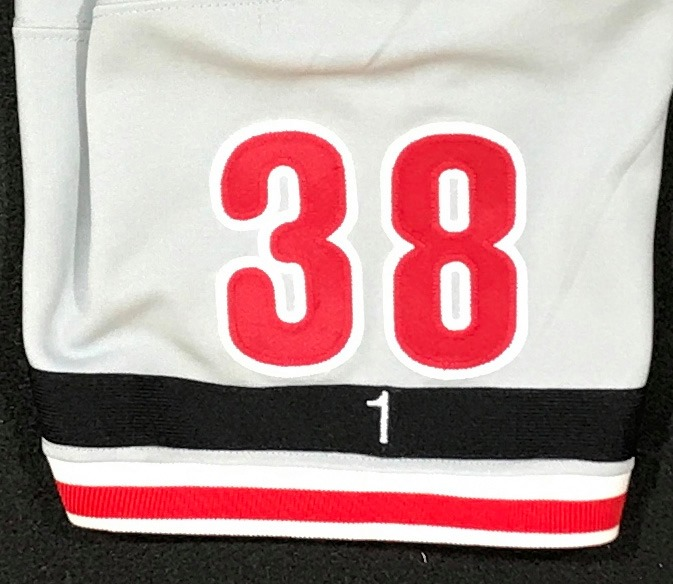
Schilling's 1997 #38 Philadelphia Phillies road jersey

After having struggled with the Orioles and Astros, Schilling was given the chance to pitch and start with the Philadelphia Phillies on a regular basis and flourished as the ace of the Phillies staff, leading the team in wins (14), ERA (2.35), strikeouts (147) and shutouts (4) in his first season with them in 1992. During the Phillies' pennant run in 1993, Schilling went 16–7 with a 4.02 ERA and 186 strikeouts. Schilling led the Phillies to an upset against the two-time defending National League champion Atlanta Braves in the National League Championship Series. Although he received no decisions during his two appearances in the six-game series, Schilling's 1.69 ERA and 19 strikeouts (including the first 5 Braves hitters of Game 1, an NLCS record) were enough to earn him the 1993 NLCS Most Valuable Player Award. The Phillies went on to face the defending world champion Toronto Blue Jays in the World Series. After losing Game 1, he pitched brilliantly in his next start. With the Phillies facing elimination the day after losing a bizarre 15–14 contest at home in Veterans Stadium, Schilling pitched a five-hit shutout that the Phillies won, 2–0.

Schilling was named to the NL All-Star team in 1997, 1998, and 1999 and started the 1999 game. In 1997, he finished 14th in NL MVP voting and fourth in NL Cy Young voting. During this season he set the Phillies single-season strikeout record with 319, surpassing the previous record of 310 strikeouts set by Steve Carlton who had held the record since 1972. Schilling either led or tied for the Phillies leader in wins, complete games, shutouts, and ERA among starters each season from 1997 to 1999, averaging 16 wins per season over those three years despite the team never finishing the season with a winning record. Unhappy with the team's performance, he requested a trade to a more competitive team in 2000 and was subsequently dealt to the Arizona Diamondbacks. His 101 career victories ranks sixth all-time for Phillies pitchers, 20th in ERA (3.35), 23rd in games appeared in (242), sixth in games started (226), 34th in complete games (61), 13th in shutouts (14), fourth in strikeouts (1554), and eighth in innings pitched (1659 1/3). Schilling spent eight and a half years with Philadelphia, his longest tenure with any team.

=== Arizona Diamondbacks (2000–2003) ===
Schilling was traded to the Diamondbacks on July 26, 2000, for first baseman Travis Lee and pitchers Vicente Padilla, Omar Daal, and Nelson Figueroa. With Arizona, he went 22–6 with a 2.98 ERA in 2001, leading the majors in wins and innings pitched. He also went 4–0 with a 1.12 ERA in the playoffs. In the 2001 World Series, the Diamondbacks beat the New York Yankees in seven games. Schilling was 1–0 in that World Series with a 1.69 ERA and 26 strikeouts in 21 innings, though he also allowed a go-ahead home run in the 8th inning of Game Seven. He shared the 2001 World Series MVP Award with teammate Randy Johnson (who relieved Schilling in Game Seven and got the win after the Diamondbacks' dramatic ninth-inning comeback). Schilling and Johnson also shared Sports Illustrated magazine's 2001 "Sportsmen of the Year" award. During the World Series Schilling received two other honors, as he was presented that year's Roberto Clemente and Branch Rickey Awards, the first Arizona Diamondback so honored for either award.

In 2002, he went 23–7 with a 3.23 ERA. He struck out 316 batters while walking 33 in 259 1/3 innings. On April 7, 2002, Schilling threw a one-hit shutout striking out 17 against the Milwaukee Brewers. Both years he finished second in the Cy Young Award voting to Johnson. Schilling finished the 2003 season with an 8–9 record and a 2.95 ERA in 168 innings while striking out 194 batters. In November 2003, the Diamondbacks traded Schilling to the Boston Red Sox in exchange for Jorge de la Rosa, Casey Fossum, Mike Goss, and Brandon Lyon.

=== Boston Red Sox (2004–2007) ===
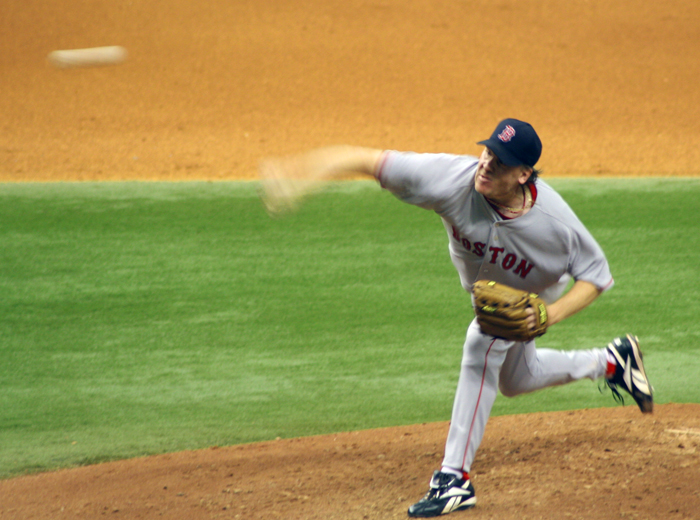
Schilling with the Boston Red Sox in 2006

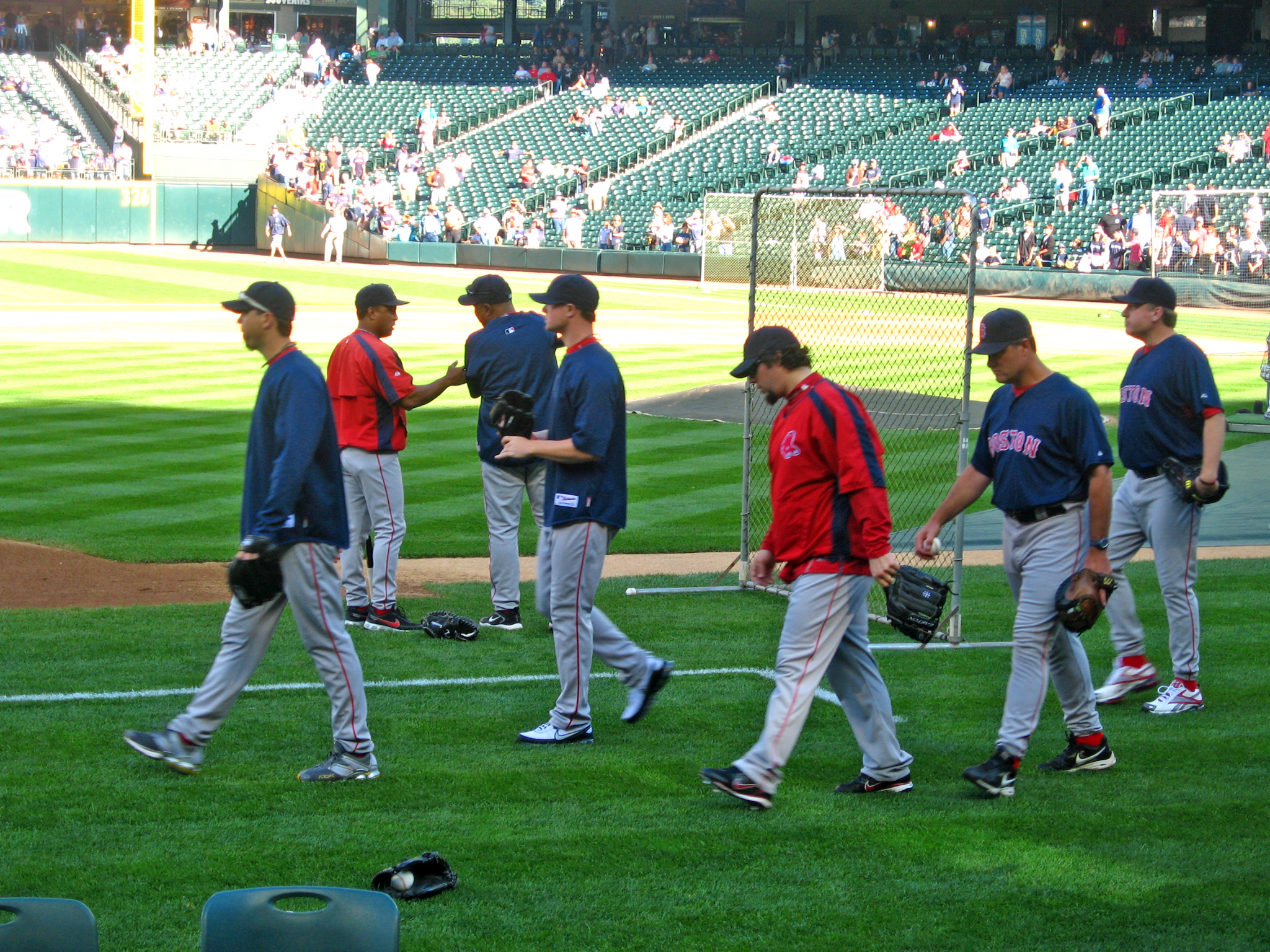
Pitchers Josh Beckett, Jon Lester, Éric Gagné, pitching coach John Farrell, and Schilling prior to a 2007 Red Sox game at Safeco Field

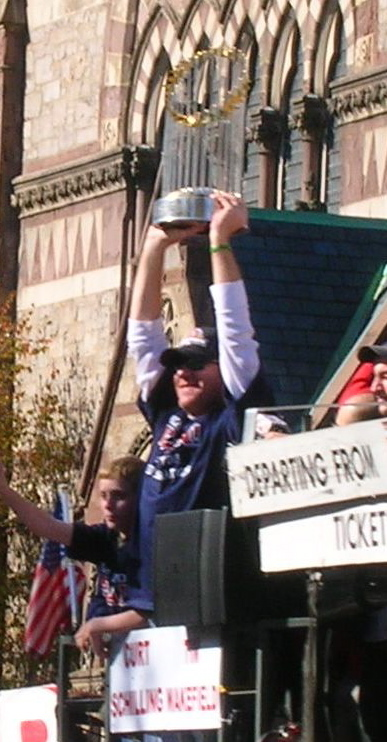
Schilling hoists the Commissioner's Trophy during the Red Sox' 2007 World Series parade.

The trade to Boston reunited Schilling with Terry Francona, his manager during his final four years with the Philadelphia Phillies. On September 16, 2004, Schilling won his 20th game of 2004 for the Red Sox, becoming the fifth Boston pitcher to win 20 or more games in his first season with the team, and the first since Hall of Famer Dennis Eckersley in 1978. Schilling ended his regular season with a 21–6 record.

On October 19, 2004, Schilling won Game 6 of the 2004 American League Championship Series against the New York Yankees. Notably, he won this game playing on an injured ankle—the same injuries that contributed to his disastrous outing in Game 1 of the ALCS. These injuries were so acute that by the end of his Game 6 performance, blood visibly soaked part of his white sock, which is now referred to as "the bloody sock". The victory forced a Game 7, which the Red Sox would go on to win to capture the pennant and make their first World Series appearance since 1986. Schilling pitched (and won) Game 2 of the 2004 World Series for the Red Sox against the St. Louis Cardinals. In both series, he had to have the tendon in his right ankle stabilized repeatedly, in what has become known as the Schilling tendon procedure, after the tendon sheath was torn during his Game 1 ALDS appearance against the Anaheim Angels. As in Game 6 of the ALCS, Schilling's sock was soaked with blood from the sutures used in this medical procedure, but he still managed to pitch seven strong innings, giving up one run on four hits and striking out four. This second bloody sock was placed in the Baseball Hall of Fame after Boston's victory over St. Louis in the World Series. A four-game sweep of the World Series erased the Curse of the Bambino. On February 23, 2013, the first bloody sock was sold at a live auction at the Fletcher-Sinclair Mansion for $92,613 to an anonymous bidder.

Schilling was once again runner-up in Cy Young voting in 2004, this time to Minnesota Twins hurler Johan Santana, who was a unanimous selection, receiving all 28 first-place votes. Schilling received 27 of the 28 second-place votes. Later, the entire Red Sox team was named Sports Illustrated's 2004 Sportsmen of the Year, making Schilling only the second person to have won or shared that award twice.

Schilling began 2005 on the disabled list due to recurrent ankle injuries. He returned on April 13 and made three starts before landing on the DL again. He returned in July as Boston's closer. He eventually returned to the starting rotation and continued to struggle. The Red Sox made it to the playoffs, but were swept by the Chicago White Sox in three games.

For the 2006 season, Schilling was said to be healthy. He began the season 4–0 with a 1.61 ERA. He finished the year with a 15–7 record and 198 strikeouts, with a respectable 3.97 ERA. On May 27, he earned his 200th career win, the 104th major league pitcher to accomplish the feat. On August 30, Schilling collected his 3,000th strikeout. Schilling has the highest ratio of strikeouts to walks of any pitcher with at least 3,000 strikeouts, and is one of four pitchers to reach the 3,000-K milestone before reaching 1,000 career walks. The other three who accomplished this feat are Fergie Jenkins, Greg Maddux, and former Boston Red Sox ace and teammate Pedro Martínez.

In January 2007, Schilling announced on the Dennis and Callahan show that after talking with his family he had changed his mind, and did not want to retire at the conclusion of the 2007 season. He sought to negotiate an extension to his current contract, but Red Sox executives announced that they would not negotiate with him until after the season, citing Schilling's age and physical condition as factors in their decision. Schilling went on to say he would become a free agent at the end of the season, for the first time in his career, and would not negotiate with the Red Sox during the 15 days after the end of the World Series when the team has exclusive negotiating rights with potential free agents. On a June appearance on the Dennis and Callahan Show, Schilling stated he would accept a one-year extension to his contract at his current salary if the Red Sox offered it to him. Questioned on his statement, Schilling said, "I said I wouldn't negotiate a deal during the season, and I'm saying that now. But I would accept that offer."

On June 7, 2007, Schilling came within one out of his first career no-hitter. Schilling gave up a two-out single to Oakland's Shannon Stewart, who lined a 95-mph fastball to right field for the A's only hit. Schilling followed up his one-hitter with two poor starts and was sent back to Boston on June 20 for an MRI on his shoulder and was placed on the disabled list. He returned from the disabled list on August 6, pitching at least six innings in each of his nine starts following the All-Star break.

Schilling continued his career postseason success in 2007, throwing seven shutout innings in a 9–1 victory over the Angels in the ALDS, wrapping up a three-game sweep for Boston. However, he did not fare as well pitching in Game 2 of the ALCS against Cleveland, surrendering nine hits—two of them home runs—and five earned runs in just 4 2/3 innings. He did start again in the sixth game of the series, pitching seven complete innings during which he recorded five strikeouts, surrendering no walks with only two earned runs to gain the victory and force a Game 7. He earned his third win of the 2007 playoffs in Game 2 of the 2007 World Series leaving after 5 1/3 innings, striking out four while allowing only four hits. With this win, he became only the second pitcher over the age of 40 to start and win a World Series game (Kenny Rogers became the first just one year prior). As Schilling departed in the 6th inning, fans at Fenway Park gave Schilling a standing ovation.

Schilling filed for free agency on October 30, 2007. He said he would seek a one-year deal, and according to ESPN First Take and his own blog page 38 Pitches. Schilling later signed a one-year deal with the Boston Red Sox for the 2008 season. Schilling missed all of the 2008 season because of a shoulder injury. The injury was first revealed in February 2008 and the treatment options became a point of contention between Schilling and the Red Sox management. On March 13, 2008, the Red Sox placed Schilling on the 60-day disabled list as he continued to rehabilitate his right shoulder. On June 18, 2008, Curt Schilling left the team to be reevaluated after suffering pain when throwing off the mound. On June 20, 2008, Schilling stated on WEEI's Dennis and Callahan show that he would undergo season-ending surgery and that he had possibly thrown the last pitch of his career. On June 23, 2008, Schilling underwent biceps surgery, during which a small undersurface tear on the rotator cuff was discovered and stitched, and a separation of the labrum was repaired. According to his surgeon, he could begin throwing in four months.

=== Retirement and honors ===
On March 23, 2009, Schilling officially announced his retirement from professional baseball after 20 seasons. Schilling ended his career with a 216–146 record, 3.46 ERA and 3116 strikeouts, 15th-most in MLB history. He was selected to the Boston Red Sox Hall of Fame in 2012. On August 2, 2013, Schilling was inducted into the Philadelphia Phillies Wall of Fame.

==== National Baseball Hall of Fame consideration ====
Having last pitched in 2007, Schilling became eligible for election to the National Baseball Hall of Fame with the 2013 ballot, when he received 38.8% of the vote, well short of the 75% required for induction, but well above the 5% required to remain on the ballot. His support ramped in subsequent elections; in 2020 balloting he appeared on 278 of the 397 ballots cast (70.0%), just 20 votes short. In 2021 balloting, announced on January 26, 2021, Schilling appeared on 71.1% of the ballots cast, again falling short of the 75% election threshold. The degree to which Schilling's "propensity for divisive statements" may have influenced voters has been discussed by media. Following the announcement of 2021 balloting results, Schilling announced on Facebook that he would be asking the Hall of Fame to remove his name from the 2022 ballot and that he would defer to the Veterans Committee to judge his career. The BBWAA enjoined the Hall of Fame to ignore his request and leave him on the ballot for 2022. He was not selected on the 2022 ballot, receiving 58.6% of the vote in his 10th and final year on the BBWAA ballot. He was eligible for the National Baseball Hall of Fame through the Contemporary Baseball Era Players Committee in December 2022 but did not receive enough votes for induction.

== Pitching style ==
During the prime of his career, Schilling was capable of reaching and sustaining speeds of 94–98 mph on his four-seam fastball. Throughout his career, he was characterized by a determination to go deep into games, routinely pitching past the sixth and seventh innings. He combined his endurance with pinpoint control, especially on his fastball. Schilling's "out" pitch was a split-finger fastball, which he generally located beneath the strike zone (resulting in many swinging strikeouts). He also possessed an above-average changeup, an effective slider, and mixed in an occasional curveball, though he mainly alternated between his fastball and splitter. Though his velocity decreased in later years (to the 89–93 range on his fastball), his control remained excellent, and he is currently fifth in career strikeout to walk ratio.

== Awards and accomplishments ==
Awards

- Babe Ruth Award (2001)
- 2× Baseball Digest Pitcher of the Year (2001, 2004)
- Branch Rickey Award (2001)
- Hutch Award (2001)
- Lou Gehrig Memorial Award (1995)
- 6× MLB All-Star (1997, 1998, 1999, 2001, 2002, 2004)
- 4× MLB Pitcher of the Month (May 1999, May 2001, May 2002, July 2002)
- 3× MLB Player of the Week (May 27, 2001; August 5, 2001; August 17, 2003)
- National League Championship Series Most Valuable Player Award (1993)
- Philadelphia Baseball Wall of Fame inductee (2013)
- Philadelphia Sports Hall of Fame inductee (2014)
- 2× Players Choice Award for NL Outstanding Pitcher (2001, 2002)
- Roberto Clemente Award (2001)
- 2× Sporting News NL Pitcher of the Year (2001, 2002)
- Sporting News Sportsman of the Year (2001)
- 2× Sports Illustrated Sportsperson of the Year (2001, 2004)
- 3× World Series champion (2001, 2004, 2007)
- World Series Most Valuable Player Award (2001)

Accomplishments

- 3× 300 strikeouts in one season (1996, 1997, 2002)
- 3,000 strikeout club (2006)
- 4× NL complete games leader (1996, 1998, 2000, 2001)
- MLB hits per nine innings pitched leader (1992)
- 3× NL games started leader (1997, 1998, 2001)
- 2× NL innings pitched leader (1998, 2001)
- 2× NL strikeout leader (1998, 2001)
- 5× AL/NL strikeout-to-walk ratio leader (2001–04, 2006)
- 2× AL/NL walks per nine innings pitched leader (2002, 2006)
- 2× NL walks plus hits per inning pitched leader (1992, 2002)
- 2× MLB wins leader (2001, 2004)

== Post-baseball career ==
=== Broadcast analyst ===
Schilling debuted on ESPN as a baseball color analyst on April 4, 2010, on the pre-game show for the 2010 season opener between the New York Yankees and Boston Red Sox. He has written for WEEI.com, 38pitches.com, and WordPress.com. In 2014, he was named as an analyst for ESPN's Sunday Night Baseball, although his subsequent cancer diagnosis prevented him from working the telecasts for most of the season. On September 14, 2014, Schilling returned to the Sunday Night Baseball booth as the Yankees played the Baltimore Orioles.

On August 25, 2015, ESPN.com suspended Schilling's coverage of the ongoing Little League World Series and Sunday Night Baseball after he posted a Twitter meme that compared Muslim Jihadism and German Nazis, "the math is staggering when you get to the true [number]s". Schilling deleted and apologized for the controversial tweet the same day. Schilling was also suspended from the next Sunday night game. On September 3, 2015, ESPN announced his suspension would cover all remaining 2015 Sunday Night Baseball games as well as its 2015 MLB playoff coverage.

On April 20, 2016, ESPN announced that they had fired Schilling after he shared an "anti-transgender" Facebook post, saying, "ESPN is an inclusive company. Curt Schilling has been advised that his conduct was unacceptable and his employment with ESPN has been terminated." Schilling's social media post came shortly after passage of the North Carolina transgender restroom law. In September 2017, Schilling accused ESPN of a double standard when reporter Jemele Hill was not fired or suspended following a controversial social media post about Donald Trump. In an on-air phone interview with CNN, Schilling defended Hill's right to speak her mind, then stated, "I wasn't fired for speaking my mind; I was fired for being a conservative."

=== Political involvement ===
Schilling campaigned for President George W. Bush in 2004, while several members of the ownership of the Red Sox campaigned for the Democratic challenger, Senator John Kerry. Schilling said he was encouraged to run for Kerry's seat in the U.S. Senate in 2008 as a Republican. Schilling was quoted in The Boston Globe as saying that he intended to pitch in 2008, which would preclude a Senate run.

He was called to Capitol Hill to testify about anabolic steroid use in March 2005, not as a suspected user but rather as a vocal opponent. He has said that Jose Canseco's statistics should be thrown out due to his admitted use of steroids, and has also said that unless he can refute allegations that he used performance-enhancing drugs, Roger Clemens should be stripped of the four Cy Young Awards he has won since 1997.

On January 29, 2007, Schilling announced in an interview that he would support Senator John McCain, who became the Republican nominee in the 2008 U.S. presidential election. In the same interview, he criticized then-presidential Democratic candidate and Senator Hillary Clinton for comments criticizing the war in Iraq. Schilling also turned up on the campaign trail several times stumping for McCain.

Schilling was mentioned as a possible candidate for U.S. Senate in the special election in Massachusetts for the seat left vacant by the death of Senator Ted Kennedy. He ruled out a run during his September 24, 2009, appearance on sports radio talk show Dennis and Callahan. In 2009, Schilling endorsed Scott Brown for the seat. During the campaign, Martha Coakley, the Democratic candidate, called Schilling a Yankee fan. Coakley was ridiculed for the comment; critics said it showed she was out of touch with the Boston community. Schilling joked about the incident: "I've been called a lot of things. ... But never, and I mean never, could anyone ever make the mistake of calling me a Yankee fan. Well, check that, if you didn't know what the hell is going on in your own state, maybe you could."

In October 2016, Schilling joined Breitbart News, a far-right opinion and news organization. Schilling announced that he would challenge Senator Elizabeth Warren in the 2018 U.S. Senate election in Massachusetts, but ended up dropping out and supported politician and conspiracy theorist Shiva Ayyadurai in the race. Schilling expressed interest in running for president in 2024 had Donald Trump been re-elected in 2020.

In November 2014, Schilling got into a day-long Twitter argument with baseball writer Keith Law over the creation–evolution controversy, where he argued for creationism against Law's defense of evolution, after which ESPN decided to suspend Law's Twitter account. ESPN commented that "Keith's Twitter suspension had absolutely nothing to do with his opinions on the subject", but it remains unclear what other motivation is behind the act, since the conversation between Schilling and Law reportedly "never really turned hostile", with many reading the details feeling that his suspension was "ridiculous". Schilling's account was not suspended, and he continued to tweet. Returning to Twitter after the ban expired, Law's first tweet "Eppur si muove" ("And yet it moves") made clear that Schilling's complaints about his posts contradicting his argument were in fact the reason for the suspension.

Schilling attracted further media scrutiny about tweets in which he showed support for lynching journalists and the January 6 U.S. Capitol attack.

On September 25, 2023, Schilling attracted controversy when he reposted an antisemitic tweet that made references to on "Jews in leading roles" in government and society, the "Jewish Question", and Jews "dominating important sectors of a nation … when they didn't even found said nation."

=== 38 Studios ===
In 2006, Schilling created Green Monster Games, which Schilling stated was not named after the Fenway left field wall. In early 2007, the company's name changed to 38 Studios.

In January 2008, Schilling announced that he would be focusing on an MMORPG project after his retirement. Comic book creator Todd McFarlane and fantasy author R.A. Salvatore were working with Schilling on the project. The new game was developed under the code-name Copernicus. A single-player RPG set in the same setting, titled Kingdoms of Amalur: Reckoning, was released by 38 Studios in February 2012. Executives from 38 Studios introduced the game at the 2010 San Diego Comic-Con.

In July 2010, the Rhode Island Board of Economic Development approved a $75 million guaranteed loan to 38 Studios. 38 Studios promised to bring 450 jobs to the state by the end of 2012. In May 2012, 38 Studios defaulted on its loan from the state of Rhode Island and failed to meet payroll obligations to its employees. 38 Studios and its subsidiary, Big Huge Games, then laid off their staffs with a mass email. Some of the laid-off employees may have had second mortgages, because the company had not actually sold homes for them as part of a relocation package. Some have accused Schilling of hypocrisy based on the conflict between his professed views on "big government" and the studio's relationship with "big government". On November 1, 2012, Schilling was sued by the state in connection with the loan. Governor Lincoln Chafee said: "My message to Rhode Islanders is this: I know that you work hard for your paychecks, and for your tax dollars to be squandered is unacceptable. The Board's legal action was taken to rectify a grave injustice put upon the people of Rhode Island."

In a July 2012 interview, Schilling discussed the downfall of 38 Studios, citing the Rhode Island governor and his own optimism as the primary reasons for the demise of the company. Ultimately, the company filed for bankruptcy; Schilling, other 38 Studios executives, and other parties associated with the company agreed in a court settlement to repay the state of Rhode Island $61 million.

== Personal life ==
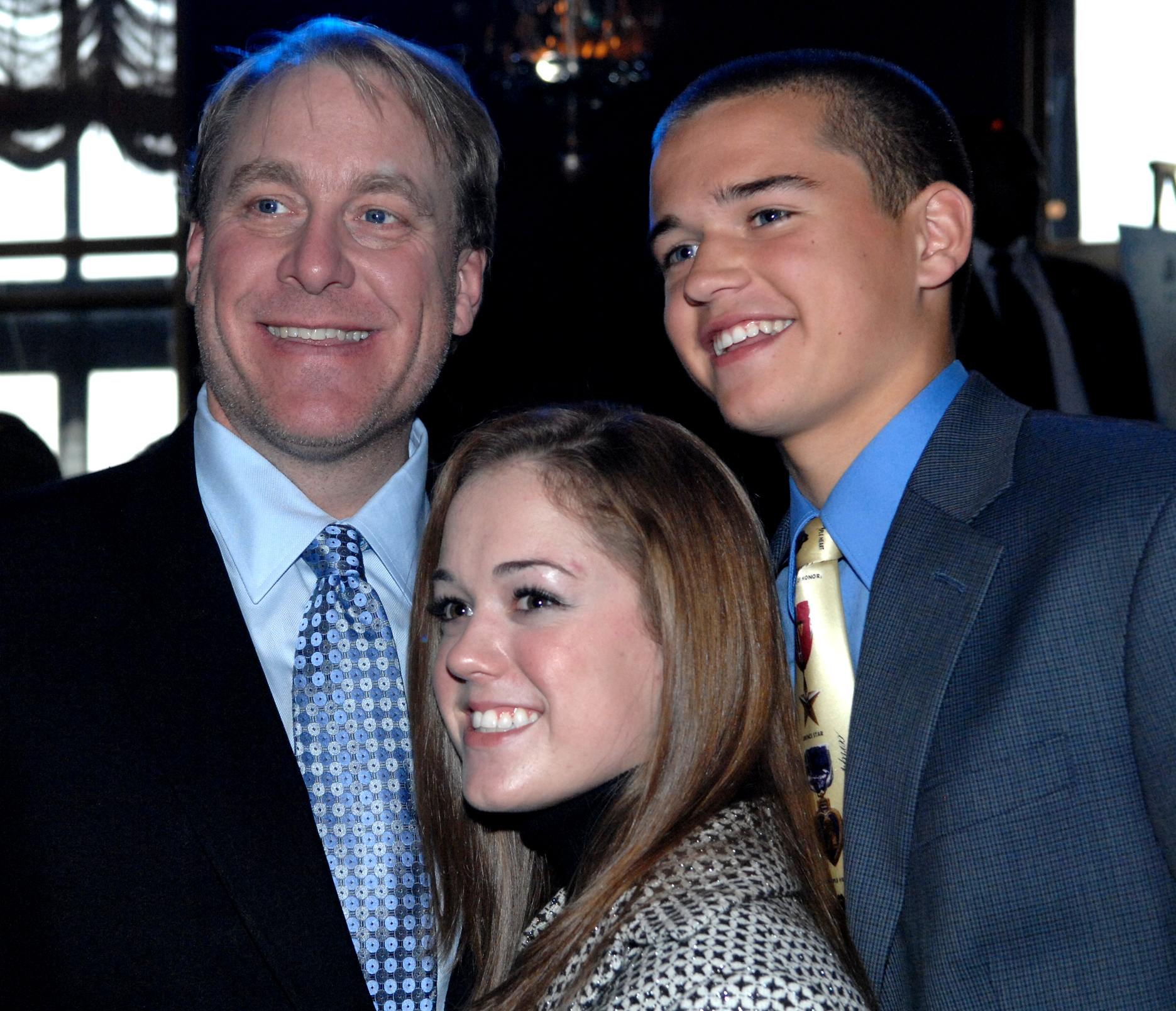
Schilling presenting an "Above and Beyond Award" in 2007

He considers his family's native Pittsburgh metro area to be home and is a fan of the Pittsburgh Steelers.

Until 2013, Schilling lived in Medfield, Massachusetts, in Drew Bledsoe's former home. In late 2013, Schilling's house in Massachusetts was listed for sale at $3 million. Various personal belongings, including a golf cart, were also listed.

He is married to Shonda Schilling. They have four children, born 1995, 1997, 1999 and 2002.

Schilling has been a long time supporter and advocate for ALS-related charities. In Philadelphia, Arizona, and Boston, Schilling's charity "Curt's Pitch for ALS" raised money and awareness for ALS within those respective communities. Schilling and wife Shonda raised over five million dollars for ALS treatment and research. After the 2004 ALCS Game 6 "bloody sock game", knowing the cameras would be focused on his injured ankle in his next start, Schilling wrote "K ALS" on his cleat directly below the injury for Game 2 of the 2004 World Series.

Schilling is a born-again Christian. He became an evangelical in 1997. Schilling opposes same-sex marriage and believes that each state should decide its laws on the topic rather than the federal government.

He has an extensive collection of World War II memorabilia, including "numerous Nazi uniforms with swastikas" and "uniforms worn by various SS divisions, including Hitler's personal bodyguards"; Schilling has specified that it is "not a Nazi collection. It's a collection of World War II stuff," further stating that he doesn't "have a racist bone in (his) body".

Before the 2007 season, Schilling started a blog called 38pitches.com in which he answered fan questions, documented his starts, and rebutted press coverage about him or the team that he believed to be inaccurate. After retiring, he moved his blog to the WEEI sports radio website. After a disagreement with the station, Schilling removed it from that site. Schilling periodically contributes on the ESPN Boston website answering fan questions about the Red Sox or baseball in general.

=== Cancer ===
In 2014, Schilling was treated for throat cancer, specifically squamous-cell carcinoma; he announced that his cancer was in remission later that year. Schilling attributed his cancer to his use of smokeless tobacco for 30 years, and warned other MLB users of the risks.

=== Conflicts with players and management ===
The outspoken Schilling has engaged in several conflicts with fellow players. Schilling was publicly criticized by Phillies teammates Mitch Williams, Larry Andersen, and Danny Jackson for his conduct during the 1993 World Series. Whenever Williams, a hard-throwing closer with a penchant for unpredictability and erratic control, was on the mound, CBS television cameras caught Schilling in the dugout hiding his face with a towel. Although Schilling said he was nervous in the heat of the World Series, his teammates criticized him for being disrespectful.

Schilling has directed comments toward New York Yankees third baseman Alex Rodriguez, calling a Rodríguez tag in Game 6 of the ALCS a "bush-league play" on The Jim Rome Show.

During a game as a Diamondback in 2003, he damaged a QuesTec camera with a bat. According to Schilling, the umpire behind the plate had said "I can't call that pitch a strike, the machine won't let me." This led to a fine and a public exchange of insults with Major League Baseball executive Sandy Alderson, who accused Schilling of whining and wanting balls to be called strikes. In response Schilling said Alderson was "ignorant to the facts and ignorant about what I said."

During a radio show appearance on May 8, 2007, Schilling criticized Barry Bonds, stating: "He admitted to cheating on his wife, cheating on his taxes and cheating on the game." Soon after, Schilling issued an apology on his blog, stating "it was absolutely irresponsible and wrong to say what I did".

After the 2008 season, Schilling released a blog post blasting former teammate Manny Ramirez's conduct before Ramirez left the Red Sox.

While with the Phillies, Schilling was a vocal critic of team management.

=== Conflicts with media ===
Schilling had a longstanding feud with ESPN and former Arizona Republic reporter Pedro Gomez, initially over a Gomez article that criticized then-Diamondbacks manager Buck Showalter. Gomez then published a column critical of Schilling, the same day Schilling was pitching in Game 7 of the 2001 World Series. In his column, Gomez stated, "During the past few days, the country...has discovered Schilling's little secret, the one baseball insiders have known for years but has rarely surfaced into the mainstream. Schilling is something of a con man, someone more intent on polishing his personal image through whatever means possible." A year later, Gomez further angered Schilling by calling the friendship between Schilling and teammate Randy Johnson "cosmetic".

In interviews in October 2004 and February 2006, Schilling, while criticizing Baltimore Sun sports columnist Laura Vecsey, compared her to Gomez and sportswriter Jon Heyman:

There are a lot of her in that industry, Pedro Gomez, Joel [sic] Heyman, to name a few. People with so little skill in their profession that they need to speculate, make up, fabricate, to write something interesting enough to be printed. What makes them bad people? I am sure I cannot nail the exact reason, but I know some. Jealousy, bitterness, the need to be 'different.'

In 2007, Schilling spoke out against Boston Globe sports columnist Dan Shaughnessy, who had been criticizing Schilling for the condition he showed up in for spring training, referred to him as "the Big Blowhard" and mocked Schilling's blog and radio appearances. Schilling responded on a local baseball web forum and his own blog to claim to have found errors in Shaughnessy's columns.

On April 27, 2007, broadcaster Gary Thorne said that he overheard Red Sox catcher Doug Mirabelli say that the blood on the sock used by Schilling in Game 6 of the 2004 ALCS was actually paint. Mirabelli accused Thorne of lying and a day later, after talking to Mirabelli, Thorne backed off his statement saying he misinterpreted what was intended as a joke, "Having talked with him today, there's no doubt in my mind that's not what he said, that's not what he meant. He explained that it was in the context of the sarcasm and the jabbing that goes on in the clubhouse."

Schilling responded in his blog by saying the following:

So Gary Thorne says that Doug told him the blood was fake. Which even when he's called out he can't admit he lied. Doug never told Gary Thorne anything. Gary Thorne overheard something and then misreported what he overheard. Not only did he misreport it, he misinterpreted what he misreported.

=== Gaming hobby ===
Schilling plays the board wargame Advanced Squad Leader.

ASL has become his constant companion on road trips, and every National League city is now his playground for baseball at night and ASL in the day. (All of which has become a bonanza for ASL players of his acquaintance, who are sometimes Curt's guests at stadiums around the country.)

Schilling's disappointment at not being able to attend the game's annual convention led him, along with ASL great Gary Fortenberry, to create his own, The ASL Open, which debuted the weekend of January 15, 1993, in Dallas. Schilling started a gaming publication, Fire for Effect, a bi-monthly magazine featuring "some of the ASL hobby's best writers".

When his favorite game was sold along with Avalon Hill to Hasbro, Schilling joined the small gaming company Multi-Man Publishing which maintained ASL and other Avalon Hill titles. MMP also started a new, professional publication entitled ASL Journal and contributed articles, editorials, and game scenarios.

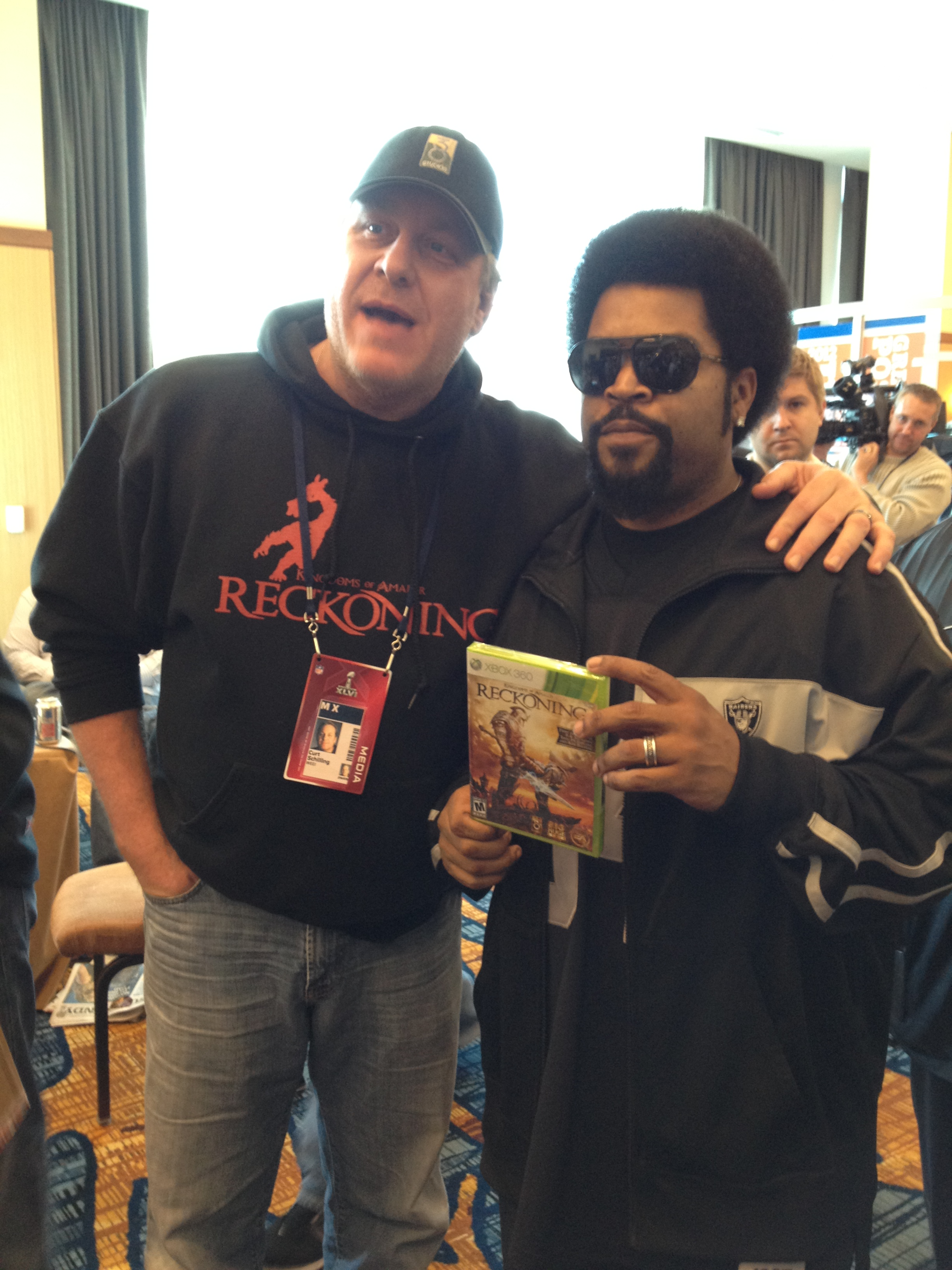
Schilling and Ice Cube promoting Kingdoms of Amalur: Reckoning

Schilling has played EverQuest and EverQuest II and has reviewed two of the game's many expansion packs for PC Gamer magazine. He has a custom avatar in EverQuest II, as the creators of the game have made Schilling a special online character. From June 5 to June 7, 2006, fans were able to battle a virtual Curt Schilling in the game. Every time the virtual Schilling was defeated, Sony Online Entertainment donated $5 towards ALS research. Schilling has played World of Warcraft and became a regular guest on the World of Warcraft podcast The Instance.

=== Tim Wakefield illness ===
On September 26, 2023, Schilling broke the news that former Boston Red Sox pitcher Tim Wakefield and his wife, Stacy, were battling cancer. Schilling had not received the family's permission, and immediately drew backlash online and a prompt statement from the Boston Red Sox organization. Wakefield died five days later, on October 1.

=== Other ===
In 2015, at least two Twitter users were punished over vulgar tweets about Schilling's then-17-year-old daughter: one lost his part-time job as a ticket seller for the Yankees, and another was suspended from Brookdale Community College. Schilling claimed at least seven others were also penalized by their jobs or athletic teams.

Schilling was selected as the commencement speaker for Worcester Polytechnic Institute's 2010 commencement and awarded a Doctorate of Science, honoris causa.

== See also ==
- 100 Inning Game – annual event to raise funds for Curt's Pitch for ALS
  - Arizona Diamondbacks award winners and league leaders
  - Team records
  - Philadelphia Phillies award winners and league leaders
  - Team records
- List of Boston Red Sox award winners
- List of Major League Baseball annual strikeout leaders
- List of Major League Baseball annual wins leaders
- List of Major League Baseball career games started leaders
- List of Major League Baseball career strikeout leaders
- List of Major League Baseball career WAR leaders
- List of Major League Baseball career WHIP leaders
- List of Major League Baseball career wins leaders
- List of Major League Baseball pitchers who have beaten all 30 teams
- List of Major League Baseball postseason records
- List of Major League Baseball titles leaders
- List of World Series starting pitchers
