= 38 Studios =

American video game developer

38 Studios, LLC
- Formerly: Green Monster Games (2006–2007)
- Type: Private
- Industry: Video games
- Founded: September 8, 2006; 20 years ago in Maynard, Massachusetts, US
- Founder: Curt Schilling
- Defunct: June 7, 2012; 14 years ago
- Fate: Bankruptcy
- Headquarters: Providence, Rhode Island, US
- Key people: Curt Schilling (chairman); Jennifer MacLean (CEO; 2009–2012); Bill Thomas (president, COO); Brett Close (CEO; 2006–2009)
- Products: Kingdoms of Amalur: Reckoning
- Number of employees: 400 (2012)

38 Studios, LLC was an American video game development studio and publisher based in Providence, Rhode Island. The company was founded in Maynard, Massachusetts, in 2006 as Green Monster Games by baseball player Curt Schilling. Schilling's goal was to create an original fantasy property, collaborating with writer R. A. Salvatore and artist Todd McFarlane on the fantasy setting of Amalur. From its inception, 38 Studios worked on a massively multiplayer online role-playing game known as Project Copernicus, intended as their main product upon which other Amalur properties would be based. The company continued to grow its staff during its lifetime, acquiring Big Huge Games as a subsidiary in 2009.

A Big Huge Games prototype was reworked into Kingdoms of Amalur: Reckoning (2012), a single-player RPG intended to introduce the Amalur setting. Also in development at 38 Studios was a tactical role-playing follow-up to Rise of Nations. 38 Studios relocated to Providence in exchange for a $75 million loan from the local government. A combination of factors led to 38 Studios declaring bankruptcy in June 2012 with debts totaling over $150 million. Handling of the Rhode Island loan prompted several legal cases, though none led to prosecutions. There was extensive media coverage surrounding the studio's final months, the canceled Project Copernicus, and its impact on former employees.

== History ==
=== Origins and Project Copernicus (2006–2009) ===
The concept for 38 Studios was created by Curt Schilling, a professional baseball player who in private life was an avid gamer. He attributed his wish to create a game of his own to disliking the design of the massively multiplayer online role-playing game (MMORPG) EverQuest II (2004). Talking about his frustrations with people he knew at Sony Online Entertainment, he began discussing the possibility of founding his own game studio. Schilling wanted to gather high-profile game developers for his venture, with it later being compared to gathering a "super star" group. Later staff noted that Schilling's celebrity status and persuasion techniques brought many notable staff on board early on. The studio formation was announced on September 8, 2006. Originally called Green Monster Games, it was based at 5 Clock Tower in Maynard, Massachusetts. Schilling was chairman, while Schilling's uncle by marriage Bill Thomas was president and chief operating officer. Among its hires between 2006 and 2008 were industry veteran Brett Close as chief executive officer (CEO), former Electronic Arts staff member Jon Laff as chief technology officer (CTO), and EverQuest lead designer Travis McGeathy. In 2007, the company was renamed to 38 Studios (Schilling's uniform number), with the stated aim being to give a "more accurate reflection" of its goals. By 2008, 38 Studios was terming itself as an "entertainment company" with project goals beyond video game development. In October of that year, the company acquired Azeroth Advisor, a dedicated newsletter platform for World of Warcraft. Close described the acquisition as a means for both companies to prosper within the same genre space.

Schilling wanted to develop a large-scale title in the MMORPG genre, wanting a market competitor to World of Warcraft. He later noted that it might have been easier to design in another genre. This game, which was known as Project Copernicus, was based in the new fantasy world of Amalur. To create Amalur, Schilling brought in two well-known creators; fantasy author R. A. Salvatore who created the lore and ten millennia of backstory, and comic book artist Todd McFarlane to handle its artistic direction. The world and lore of Amalur would be the basis for a multimedia franchise, with Schilling comparing it to a modern-day Lord of the Rings. Project Copernicus was initially scheduled for a 2011 release, with 38 Studios projecting annual profits of over $100 million from its revenue. 38 Studio's ambition was noted in 2009 in light of competition in the MMO market, and its high amount of spending without a single release. The studio's actions drew attention from the wider video game industry and media, with veteran Jason Booth noting that ambition was a requirement for success in the industry. Schilling tried to minimize his direct involvement with production, leaving that to other staff members from within the industry.

=== Subsidiaries and other projects (2009–2012) ===
In May 2009, 38 Studios acquired developer Big Huge Games as a subsidiary. Originally owned by THQ, Big Huge Games were known for their work on Rise of Nations (2003). The studio had been developing a game prototype since 2007 but were faced with closure before the buyout due to production and financial difficulties. Under 38 Studios, the prototype was repurposed into a single-player RPG that would introduce the Amalur universe; McFarlane and Salvatore oversaw the project, but the team were otherwise given creative freedom. Originally dubbed "Mercury", the game was eventually titled Kingdoms of Amalur: Reckoning. 38 Studios acted as co-publisher with Electronic Arts under the EA Partners program, with Electronic Arts contributing most of its development budget. In August, Close left 38 Studios, with former SVP of Business Development Jennifer MacLean taking over his position.

Also in production at Big Huge Games during the period was a game dubbed Rise of Nations: Tactics. Being developed for iOS using the Unity game engine, the project was led by staff member Stuart Jeff based on his love of tactical role-playing games. He wanted to use the Rise of Nations assets and world to create a more tactical title. The game was described as "roughly" complete by early 2011, and Jeff had hoped to make it cross-playable across more platforms. Staff at 38 Studios took on the project later, but the project was shelved in early 2012 so work could focus on Project Copernicus. Similarly in 2010, 38 Studios closed down the Azaroth Advisor service to focus on Project Copernicus.

Due to uncertainty surrounding the market and the studio's goals, local venture capital firms declined to invest. Funding instead came from Schilling's personal fortune and smaller private donations from industry people such as Doug Macrae. Some potential investors were turned down by Schilling as he felt they did not value the studio's goals. An anonymous employee stated that while the company required a lot of money, these generally went to development tools and salaries. In July 2010, Schilling successfully negotiated a financial agreement with the state of Rhode Island; in exchange to moving to new premises in the state, the state would provide a loan to fund its projects. Schilling's pitch was to establish a new video game industry based in Rhode Island.

The loan was negotiated with the state's Economic Development Corporation (EDC), being granted to 38 Studios as bonds; the loan's amount, $75 million, was given by Schilling as the lowest possible to allow for relocation and continued development. Both EDC staff and politicians following the process were concerned about the risks associated with such a large loan. There was general controversy due to Rhode Island's low finances, and the risky nature of the venture. A vocal opponent of the loan was Lincoln Chafee, who later became state governor. The loan agreement was completed in November 2010, and the company had successfully moved its offices to One Empire Plaza in Providence, Rhode Island by April 2011, meeting agreed move times and job creation targets ahead of schedule. The studio was also developing Helios, a platform for integrating multiplayer and social media. Operating expenses for the studio totaled $118 million between 2006 and 2011. By 2012, the studio had three subsidiaries; Big Huge Games, Mercury Project, and Precision Jobs, and around 400 employees.

== Bankruptcy proceedings (2012) ==
Reckoning released in February 2012 to critical praise, and its sales exceeded Electronic Arts's expectations. However its sales of 1.3 million copies were not enough, as 38 Studios needed two million in sales to break even. In February 2012, the studio instigated a temporary hiring freeze, which caused issues for some new members including Andy Johnson, who had joined as localization director in January. MacLean left the company on indefinite leave of absence in March, officially resigning in May. Also in March, two new staff members were hired, both veterans of MMO development; John Blakely joined as senior vice-president of development, while Mark Hansen was appointed senior vice-president of operations & business. In early May 2012, the studio defaulted on a loan repayment installment to Rhode Island. The studio's situation and associated publicity were exacerbated by hostile comments from Chafee regarding the loan.

While Project Copernicus director Steve Danuser described the studio atmosphere during this time as optimistic, the unnamed wife of an employee described 38 Studios as having "a disharmonious work environment" hinting at growing troubles. Johnson described the executive staff as "pretty much like Titanic [survivors] clamoring at driftwood, trying to get ahold of things". Several approaches were made by Schilling to Sony Online Entertainment president John Smedley about selling Project Copernicus, but Smedley turned him down due to the market not looking good for MMOs at that time. Schilling later felt that the studio suffered from "significant dysfunction" for which he was ultimately to blame due to his lack of business experience. By this point, the projected release of Project Copernicus had moved forward to 2013.

On May 18, the repayment check totaling over $1 million cleared, with the new funds attributed to suspending employee payroll and letting go of non-essential staff. Johnson remembered showing Rise of Nations: Tactics to executives in the weeks before the studio's bankruptcy, who started pushing for a quick release despite his insistence that more time was needed for development. A sequel to Reckoning, intended to address criticism of the original, had entered pre-production. An unnamed video game publisher was close to approving $30 million in funding for the sequel, but withdrew the offer. Another investor offered funding if Rhode Island agreed to renegotiate the loan and grant $6 million in tax credits, pulling out when Rhode Island refused. Ted Nesi of news service WPRI-TV, which was covering the studio's issues, highlighted brain drain from other developers as another potential threat.

On May 24, all employees were let go without warning, causing development to halt on Project Copernicus. The message from Thomas, described as written in "terse" language, caught employees unaware as they were generally kept in the dark about executive affairs so they could focus on game development. The studio was later described as "hemorrhaging cash" by EDC executive director Saul Kaplan. On June 7, 38 Studio filed for Chapter 7 bankruptcy. According to the filing, 38 Studios and its subsidiaries owed $150.7 million to 1,079 creditors, with the largest sum owed to the EDC for a $115.9 million secured debt. At the time of bankruptcy, Project Copernicus was described as 75% complete.

Rhode Island Governor Lincoln Chafee was advised by Providence Equity Partners regarding the studio. Providence previously decided to invest in ZeniMax Media but chose not to do that with 38 Studios.

== Impact ==
The collapse of the studio and letting go of employees without warning caused distress among the staff, and many were left with financial obligations from moving to Rhode Island; due to the bankruptcy, they were also left without final paychecks or insurance. In response to the job losses, other game studios and publishers reached out to provide new jobs for the former employees, and a document showing available job applications within the industry was circulated through social media. Additionally a dedicated job fair was set up in Providence for industry promoters, and Rhode Island set up support for former employees so they could file for unemployment support. Former 38 Studios employees began receiving portions of their due salaries in August 2021, expected to range between 14 and 20 percent of what they were to make before bankruptcy. Several Big Huge Games employees formed a new company under Epic Games dubbed "Epic Baltimore" in 2012, eventually buying back the Big Huge Games name and reforming the studio in 2013 with a focus on the mobile market.

Following 38 Studios' bankruptcy, the Rhode Island government took over the company assets. The assets were put up for an auction; originally planned for November 2013, interest from the game industry prompted a delay to December. The Big Huge Games label was purchased by Reynolds to reform the company, while Rise of Nations and associated properties including the Tactics game were sold to an unknown buyer. The Amalur properties did not sell, and the auction raised $320,000, which fell short of Rhode Island's expectations. Subsequently, Jeff Easley was described as the studio's only remaining employee, tasked with keeping the technical aspects of Project Copernicus running until a buyer could be found. Maintaining the studio in this form cost around $15,000 per month. In September 2018, the Amalur rights and properties were acquired by THQ Nordic.

In parallel with the bankruptcy, the Providence Police, the Rhode Island State Police, the Rhode Island attorney general's office, the U.S. Attorney’s Office, and the FBI began investigations into how the studio managed to get approval for the loan. Chafee ordered an outside firm to conduct a forensic audit of the studio's finances. Rhode Island passed a law that protected those associated with the loan and its later legal issues from further independent prosecutions if they settled with the state. An attempt in 2014 to settle for some of the loan was initially blocked by those opposed to the law. One plaintiff, a member of the EDC, dropped his separate case due to a lack of resources and not wanting to distract from the main legal issues. The case concluded in 2016 with no criminal charges filed due to insufficient evidence of criminal wrongdoing, with Rhode Island State Police Colonel Steven O’Donnell commenting that "a bad deal does not always equate to an indictment."

A civil suit was filed in November 2012 by the Rhode Island government against Schilling and thirteen other defendants−both individuals and firms−in response to the findings of the audit. The case ended in 2017 with parties agreeing to settle for a total of $61 million. The case was in the Rhode Island Superior Court's Business Calendar, a specialized business court track, before Associate Justice Michael A. Silverstein. Following settlements with the other defendants, and after payment of legal fees, Rhode Island was left with a debt of over $38 million, which had to be paid with public money. In March 2016, the Securities and Exchange Commission (SEC) brought separate charges of bank fraud against the EDC and Wells Fargo, the bank that approved the loan. The SEC alleged that both parties knew the loan was not enough to successfully fund the production of Project Copernicus. The SEC's fraud case was concluded in 2019 with a private settlement between the parties. In March, Wells Fargo settlement over $800,000 was approved by a federal judge.

=== Reception ===
Several staff members attributed the studio's collapse to overspending money, excessive optimism around the studio's core project, and a lack of new funding. While later accused by the EDC to pushing the studio into bankruptcy, Chafee stated he wanted to do whatever possible to keep the company afloat except investing more money. Schilling and other employees blamed Chafee's negative comments for triggering the studio's final collapse. Schilling was also blamed by some former employees due to apparent efforts to exploit the situation to gain sympathy. Schilling, who lost $60 million with the bankruptcy, later admitted to and apologised for the poor treatment of staff. Neither Salvatore nor McFarlane held ill will over the failed venture.

Alexa Ray Corriae of Polygon described her 2012 article concerning the spouse of a former employer as "[offering] very real, very heartbreaking human faces" to the studio's collapse. As part of a different 2012 article going into the studio, Gamasutra's Leigh Alexander noted the community spirit reported among employees, who felt the studio's collapse was due more to executive and political factors than Schilling personally. Employee stories were also highlighted in reports by Boston Magazine in 2012, The New York Times in 2013, and Bloomberg News in 2021. Brendan Sinclair, writing for GamesIndustry.biz in 2022, highlighted 38 Studios and the production of Project Copernicus as a cautionary tale of over-ambition and an example of bad employer practices within the gaming industry. Other industry figures cited the collapse of 38 Studios and Project Copernicus as part of a wider trend in the market away from the MMO genre.

== Games ==
Year	Title	Platform(s)	Notes
2012	Kingdoms of Amalur: Reckoning	PlayStation 3, Xbox 360, Windows	Developed by Big Huge Games, co-published with Electronic Arts.

=== Canceled ===
- Rise of Nations: Tactics
- Project Copernicus
- Untitled Kingdoms of Amalur: Reckoning sequel
