= Kingdoms of Amalur: Reckoning =

2012 video game

- Developer: Big Huge Games
- Publishers: 38 Studios; Electronic Arts
- Director: Mark Nelson
- Producer: Sean Bean
- Designers: Ian Frazier; Ken Rolston
- Programmer: Bryant Freitag
- Artists: Tim Coman; Todd McFarlane
- Writers: Erik J. Caponi; Andrew Auseon; Tom Murphy
- Composers: Grant Kirkhope; Mark Cromer
- Platforms: PlayStation 3; Windows; Xbox 360
- Release: NA: February 7, 2012; AU: February 9, 2012; EU: February 10, 2012
- Genre: Action role-playing
- Mode: Single-player

Kingdoms of Amalur: Reckoning is a 2012 action role-playing game developed by Big Huge Games and published by 38 Studios and Electronic Arts for Windows, PlayStation 3 and Xbox 360. Reckoning follows the story of the Fateless One, a resurrected person freed from the destiny which binds all of Amalur's people to destruction. Gameplay consists of players exploring the Faelands of Amalur, completing quests and fighting a variety of enemies both in field and dungeon environments. The playstyle is customized through a combination of weapons types, skill trees, and passive enhancements earned through quests and the Destiny character class system.

Production of Reckoning began in 2009 based on the Amalur setting created by 38 Studios founder Curt Schilling and writer R. A. Salvatore for their in-development MMORPG Project Copernicus. Using a reworked game prototype created prior to 38 Studios acquiring Big Huge Games, Reckoning was intended to introduce the Amalur universe prior to Project Copernicus, but was otherwise developed as a standalone project. Several notable figures contributed to the game's design including artist Todd McFarlane, designer Ken Rolston, and composer Grant Kirkhope.

Reckoning was praised by critics for its combat design and graphics, but the story and lack of gameplay depth or original features saw criticism. While selling above expectations for a new intellectual property and contributing to Electronic Arts' fiscal profits, it commercially underperformed for 38 Studios and Big Huge Games. Two downloadable content (DLC) expansions were released, but a planned sequel was canceled with the closure of 38 Studios.

A remastered version subtitled Re-Reckoning was released in 2020 for Windows, PlayStation 4 and Xbox One. A Nintendo Switch port and a third expansion Fatesworn were released in 2021. The remaster and expansion were developed by Kaiko and published by THQ Nordic, which had acquired the Amalur intellectual property. Re-Reckoning featured adjustments to the gameplay balance and incorporated all previous DLC features. The release saw mixed reviews due to technical issues which were addressed in patches, and the ageing of mechanics considered innovative at release.

== Gameplay ==
The player in combat with enemies, having activated "Reckoning" mode

Kingdoms of Amalur: Reckoning is an action role-playing game in which players, taking on the role of the Fateless One, explore the fantasy realm of the Faelands. The Fateless One's gender, appearance, and race (the human Almain and Varani groups, and the Alfar Ljosalfar and Dokkalfar tribes) are customised at the start. Each race has unique boosts to different attributes, with further passive enhancements through choosing a patron deity. Navigation is limited to the player walking or running through open areas and dungeon environments, with specific platforms for contextual jumps to lower areas, and the ability to swim through deep water. Players complete a variety of quests related to the main scenario, self-contained quest lines for groups dubbed Factions, non-repeatable side quests, and repeatable Tasks all available from non-playable characters (NPCs) found through the world's five regions. Completing quests, discovering regions of the world and completing some in-game activities reward experience points which raises the character's level and statistics.

The real-time combat focuses on the player using their two equipped weapons, and active skills unlocked through skill trees and activated through the players magic point (MP) meter. Available weapons include two sword types, two types of daggers, bows, hammers, and chakrams. The player can also block with a shield accessory with an enemy being stunned with correct timing, or dodge to avoid attacks. Some movement options are tied to specific character Abilities. Combat is based around button timing, with different combinations triggering alternate attacks and more attack options unlocking as the player's level increases. Enemies are locked to a specific level range when entering an area of the world. During combat, an energy called Fate is rewarded if the player uses a varied range of attacks. With a full Fate meter, the player can trigger "Reckoning" mode, which slows down time for everyone except the player for as long as the meter has Fate energy. An enemy down to low health can be killed through a cinematic attack, with the player able to press a button to gain an experience boost, killing all low-health enemies in the process. Enemies drop in-game currency and randomised loot including weapons, crafting materials and items such as potions. If the player runs out of health, the Fateless One dies and the player must restart from a previous save.

Character customization focuses on skills and enhancements unlocked through three Ability trees (melee-focused Might, stealth-based Finesse, magic-focused Sorcery), equipment and weapons, and tarot cards called Destinies. Destinies function as a character class system, with different ones unlocked as points are placed in different Ability trees and granting passive enhancements to character statistics or combat abilities. Completing Faction questlines and story sections unlock Twists of Fate, permanent Destinies granting additional passive enhancements. The character's Skill and Ability points can be reset at any point using characters in the world dubbed Fateweavers, who will undo the current character build for a fee.

Outside combat, the player has nine different passive Skills which can be increased using points gained from leveling up, tying into abilities such as crafting or talking to NPCs. These are Lockpicking, which allows the player to unlock chests and doors around the world; Blacksmithing, easing the forging and salvaging of weapons and armor; Dispelling, which eases the player's ability to remove magical wards from some chests; Detect Hidden which uncovers hidden item caches and reveals more landmarks on the local map; Persuasion, which can unlock additional dialogue options for some NPC conversations; Sagecraft, used to create gems to enhance weapons and armour; Alchemy, which increases the success and complexity of potion making; Mercantile, which influences selling and buying prices with in-game merchants; and Stealth which eases the player's ability to sneak around enemies and detect traps. Alongside this the player can acquire houses with access to storage for excess items.

== Synopsis ==
=== Setting and characters ===
Reckoning is set within the world of Amalur, with the game's events taking place across the Faelands, a land separated into two distinct territories by a great river. All things in the Faelands follow a destined path dictated by the Fate Weave, which can be read and reported by gifted individuals dubbed Fateweavers. The current age is referred to as the "Age of Arcana", a time when unknown magic is beginning to manifest.

Native to the Faelands are the immortal Fae of the Summer and Winter Courts, respectively representing new life and decay. Recent arrivals are the mortal races including two tribes of humans, the Ljosalfar and Dokkalfar tribes of the Alfar, and gnomes. By the game's opening, the mortal races and Summer Fae are threatened by the Tuatha Deohn, a hostile faction of the Winter Fae worshipping the god Tirnoch who are destined to wipe out all life in the Faelands and spread through Amalur.

The main protagonist is the Fateless One, a dead person brought back by the Well of Souls−a gnome-made device intended to revive the dead−and consequently severed from the Fate Weave and suffering from amnesia. They are revived and aided by the gnome Fomorous Hughes, creator of the Well of Souls. They later ally with Agarth, a warrior-turned-Fateweaver who uses drink to cope with knowledge of his death; Alyn Shir, a Dokkalfar assassin and diplomat who knew the Fateless One; and Tilera ap Gwydion, a disillusioned Ljosalfar general leading the mortal resistance against the Tuatha Deohn and their leader Gadflow.

=== Plot ===
The Fateless One is revived by the Well of Souls, which is then attacked by the Tuatha Deohn. Hughes distracts the attackers to allow the Fateless One to escape, directing them to find Agarth. Disbelieving the Fateless One's lack of destiny, Agarth eventually brings them to a Fateweaver temple to find a Fae codex recording all of Amalur's history. Once there, the Fateless One prevents Agarth's fated death, and meets with Alyn Shir. The codex, decoded by the Summer Fae's king, reveals the Fateless One's role in changing Amalur's destined destruction. The Fateless One then helps Agarth root out Tuatha Deohn agents working against them while reuniting with Hughes, and at Alyn's suggestion helps Tilera retrieve an ancestral weapon and prepare to launch an attack on a besieged city in the Winter Fae's lands. The Fateless One, Agarth, Hughes and Alyn accompany Tilera on a successful assault to break the siege, though Tilera dies in the process.

Allying with surviving friendly Winter Fae, the Fateless One tracks down a former ally, the gnome researcher Ventrinio, who helps the group secure a route into the Winter Fae stronghold Alabastra. The Fateless One's allies launch an assault on Alabastra, though Alyn kills Ventrinio as he grows obsessed with the source of Gadflow's power. Alyn reveals the Fateless One and she were part of a secret order guarding the prison of Tirnoch, a rogue Fae turned into a dragon who now seeks to escape her prison and destroy Amalur. As they near her prison, Tirnoch reveals she revived the Fateless One to free her. The Fateless One confronts Tirnoch, who kills Gadflow as he has fulfilled his purpose. The Fateless One defeats Tirnoch, allowing Alyn to rescue them and re-seal the prison, leaving a letter warning to keep Tirnoch a secret from Amalur. Agarth also reveals he can no longer see people's futures, hinting that Amalur's future is no longer predetermined.

The story is added to through downloadable content (DLC). In Legend of Dead Kel, the Fateless One is trapped on the island of Gallows End, controlled by the pirate Dead Kel. Dead Kel was saved from death by the island's god-like sentient tree Akara, who now wants the Fateless One to undo its mistake. The Fateless One defeats Dead Kel, inheriting Akara's power and taking control of Gallows End. In Teeth of Naros, the Fateless One goes to the titular land of the Kollossae, a stone-like people left demoralised after a tragic misuse of the Hyperian, a magic-amplifying artefact. Their current leader Anokatos seeks to atone by destroying the city. Allying with guard captain Secandra, the Fateless One defeats Anokatos and his followers, returning the Hyperian to the Kollossae. In Fatesworn, the Order of Fateweavers reveals that the Fateless One's actions have damaged the Fate Weave, allowing the chaos god Telogrus to begin attacking the Faelands. Travelling to the land of Mithros, the Fateless One and Agarth partner with local forces against Telogrus and his cult. To allow the Fate Weave's recovery, the Fateless One is ordered to leave the Faelands forever, seen off by Hughes, Agarth and Alyn.

== Development ==
Reckoning began as a game prototype created by Rise of Nations developer Big Huge Games in 2007, alternately known under the codenames "Crucible" and "Ascension". It was a mutli-platform release for PlayStation 3 (PS3), Xbox 360 (360) and Windows. Mark Nelson acted as creative director, whose previous work included Titan Quest and entries in The Elder Scrolls series. The gameplay design has been attributed to Nelson, veteran game designer Ken Rolston, and later lead designer Ian Frazier. Rolston was later described as "executive design director" for the game. During its prototyping phase, Nelson and Rolston wanted to blend different game genres, with RPG mechanics and real-time strategy elements and the large-scale battles of Dynasty Warriors. Realising they could not get those systems to work together, they focused on the RPG elements. The game's ambition coupled with financial troubles almost led to original publisher THQ shutting down the studio, before Big Huge Games were sold on to 38 Studios who took over as publisher and project manager.

Founded in 2006 as Green Monster Games, 38 Studios had been created by Curt Schilling, a professional baseball player and avid gamer. Working with writer R. A. Salvatore and artist Todd McFarlane, Schilling had created the fantasy setting of Amalur for an MMORPG dubbed Project Copernicus. The prototype was reworked into a game using the Amalur universe, drawing its characters and events from the lore created for Project Copernicus, being developed under the codename "Mercury". 38 Studios was co-publisher with Electronic Arts under the EA Partners program. A later report estimated the production budget at $30 million, with over $28 million being advanced by Electronic Arts to help with development. In a production postmortem, executive producer Mike Fridley noted that Electronic Arts offered a range of development support and provided much feedback during production.

Production of the final version began in May 2009, with Frazier feeling the team were given greater creative freedom under their new employers. While the technical and gameplay elements were carried over intact from the prototype, all other elements were rebuilt from scratch to match the Amalur universe. Big Huge Games were given access to the game's lore and allowed to develop the game they wanted based on it while the Amalur creators including Salvatore and McFarlane held executive roles in story and art design. The game used the same engine created by Big Huge Games for Rise of Nations, though it needed extensive adjustments to fit both the game's mechanics and its multiplatform status. They also incorporated Havok to handle the game's physics. While he was a fan and part of the modding community, Frazier noted prior to release that the game's engine could not accommodate user-created mods.

The aim from the project's outset was to create a game with engaging and "fun" combat, which was seen by the team as a rarity in the RPG genre. The game's AI, as described by producer Sean Bean, was designed to surround the player with a variety of enemy types and force a varied playstyle. The team also incorporated many random elements and optional unmarked content to give players a sense of freedom. Rolston spent much of the game's development playtesting, ensuring there were no serious bugs well before it was time to ship. When asked about including a jump option, Rolston explained it was left out except for contextual situations as it added little to exploration. The dungeons, which numbered over a hundred, were individually created by the team, with Frazier saying they were created through "brute force". The team used previous experience working on The Elder Scrolls III: Morrowind with guiding the player along the main quest line.

While Salvatore had created the world and history of Amalur, he had little direct involvement with the project. He was initially wary, but upon meeting Rolston's passion for the project, he was happy to leave it in their hands. The lead narrative designer was Erik J. Caponi, with additional work by Andrew Auseon and Tom Murphy. Frasier commented that the lack of a true lead character caused problems with the marketing, which instead focused on the world design and gameplay. Due to some production issues, the team ended up cutting a number of story cinematics, leaving the main quest's presentation lacking and relying on NPC-based story delivery similar to side quests. The dialogue system−carried over from the prototype−combined the menu-based style of the Elder Scrolls series, and a dialogue wheel made popular by BioWare in the Mass Effect series. Commenting on the game's take on his world design, Salvatore disliked the character names created by Big Huge Games, though he enjoyed the character Alyn. McFarlane, while not directly involved with development, was described as an executive art director who would check up on the team's work to ensure consistency. The in-game art assets were created with the game's engine limitations in mind, with art director Tim Coman describing designs as stylised and fantastical.

=== Audio ===
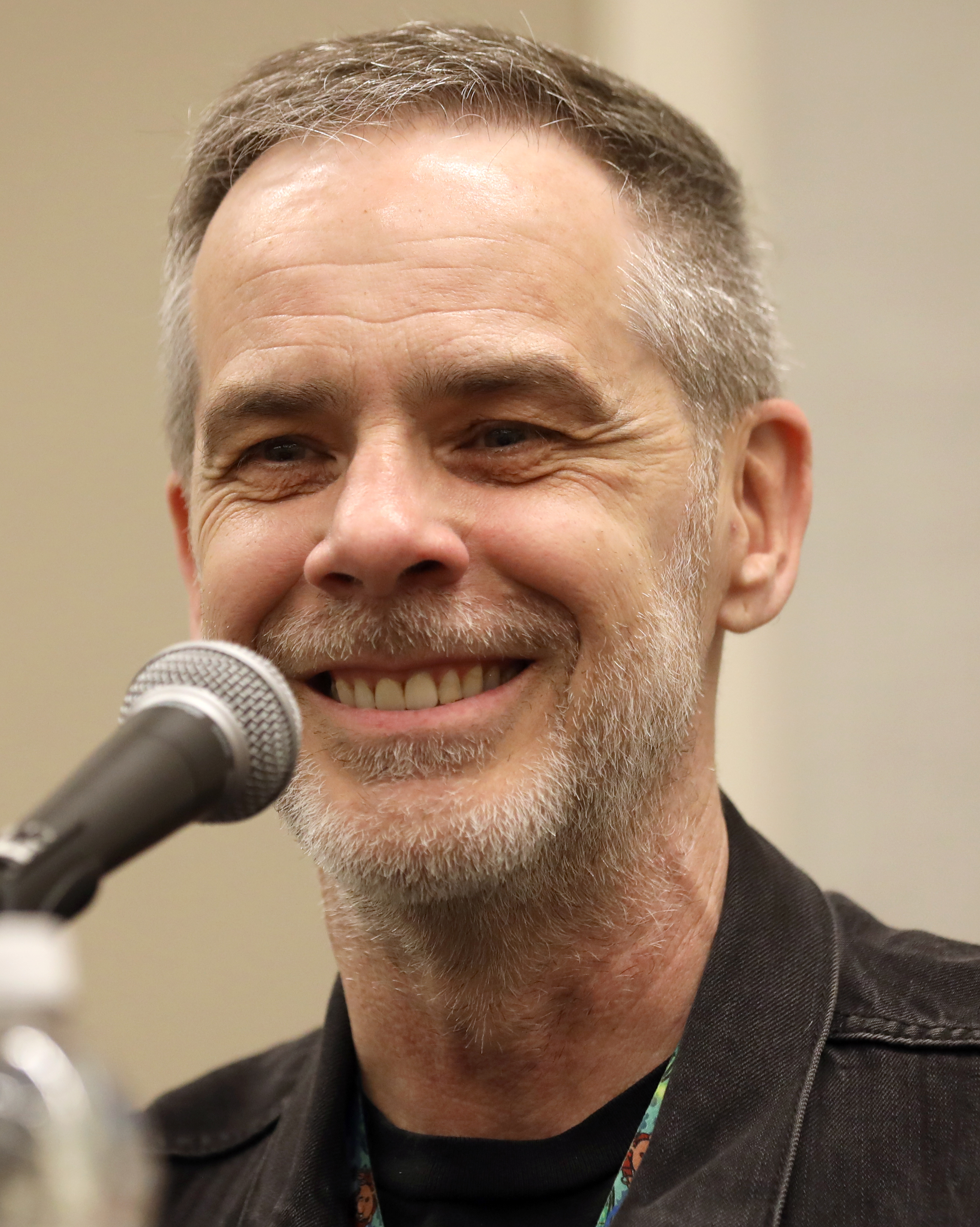
Grant Kirkhope (pictured 2024) created the orchestral score for Kingdoms of Amalur: Reckoning.

The music was mainly composed by Grant Kirkhope, who had notably worked on multiple games for British developer Rare. Reckoning was Kirkhope's first project working full-time in the United States, having left Rare to pursue a wider range of music jobs. He also opted for strong melodies which would only play once or twice during exploration rather than looping ambience. Kirkhope later described his approach on the game as taking it "a step at a time", writing some tracks such as the main theme early on and several others fairly late into production. The main theme was his first track for the game, with Kirkhope deciding on a large orchestral score to match its high fantasy setting. His first ambient track was the opening area of Dalentarth, which was the first in-game area to be completed. He drew direct inspiration from John Williams's work on the Harry Potter films, with the boss themes in particular being inspired by Williams's work.

The score was performed by the City of Prague Philharmonic Orchestra, with Nic Raine arranging and James Fitzpatrick producing. Raine and Fitzpatrick also acted as conductors. Different regions of the world had different instrumental elements in the lead, such as Dalentarth having a "wondrous element" emulating a dark fairy tale, and the open area called the Plains of Erethal focusing on strings. For the zone Alabastra, which had a large number of crystals, Kirkhope used a waterphone to add a "weird metallic sound". Alongside Kirkhope's work, tracks for the game's inns and taverns were composed and performed by Mark Cromer, who had previously worked on the Civilization series.

When choosing the large voice cast, the team both chose a variety of accents, and worked so the voices would not clash with either each other or the Amalur setting. They also included a wide variety of character responses for non-essential characters, contrasting against other games including Elder Scrolls titles which had become notorious for repetitive dialogue. The voice work was described as "a huge management issue". It was estimated that the game had over 50,000 lines of voiced dialogue.

== Release ==
The game project was confirmed in 2007 when production began at Big Huge Games, and re-announced under its "Mercury" title in March 2010 at that year's Game Developer Conference. Its final title was announced in June 2010. As part of the game's promotion, a crossover was created with Mass Effect 3, with each demo unlocking themed in-game items in the other title. A game demo released in January 2012 met with criticism due to frequent bugs and lack of polish. Schilling apologised in a forum post, noting the demo was created by Electronic Arts using outdated code. A soundtrack album featuring Kirkhope's score was released on February 7, 2012.

Reckoning was published through February 2012; it released on February 7 in North America, February 9 in Australia, and February 10 in Europe. A number of special editions with different promotional items and collectables were created in limited supply, with the most expensive Signature Edition including items created or signed by the game's creative leads. The game was published in Japan by Spike Chunsoft on September 20.

=== Downloadable content ===
When asked about DLC prior to release, Frasier noted that a menu option was included, but did not go into details on future plans. Pre-order DLC included special weapons and an item for finding potion ingredients. Armor and weapon packs for the three skill groups were released individually alongside the game's launch. A free online pass was created for early runs of the console versions, and included with digital PC versions. The pass game with a quest series focused around the House of Valor Faction. In response to negative reactions online, 38 Studios stated the House of Valor was always intended as the game's first DLC.

The game's first major DLC, described as an expansion, was released on March 20. Titled Legend of Dead Kel, it was set on the isolated island Gallows End, included new dungeon types and enemy designs along with unique weapons and Twist of Fate cards. Auseon was lead narrative designer for Legend of Dead Kel. He described the Gravehal quest line included in the expansion as a "soft Faction" with similar mechanics and character interactions to Factions in the main game.

The second DLC expansion, Teeth of Naros, was released on April 17. A new damage type dubbed "Primal" was added in the expansion, along with a new enemy type and enemy variants exclusive to Naros. For Teeth of Naros, Murphy took over as lead narrative designer. The team had wanted to raise the level cap, but unspecified logistical issues prevented this. Murphy recalled that it was challenging finding a suitable accent for the Kollossae, eventually settling on something comparable to "very light mid-Atlantic intonation" with post-processing to lower voices. Kirkhope returned to create tracks for Legend of Dead Kel and Teeth of Naros, which he released through Bandcamp on March 1. All DLC, including pre-order items and the expansions, was included with the Japanese release.

=== Cancelled developments ===
A sequel to Reckoning was in the pre-production phase during 2012, with the team eager to address complaints levelled at the original game. Two different publishers were close to offering funding for the sequel, but withdrew for different reasons. Due to ongoing financial problems, 38 Studios closed, leading to the temporary closure of Big Huge Games and the cancellation of game projects including the sequel. Due to the closure of Big Huge Games, planned console patches were cancelled, and a PC patch was released quickly to address major bugs and issues.

== Reception ==
Reception

Aggregate score
Aggregator	Score
Metacritic	81/100 (PC); 81/100 (PS3); 80/100 (360)

Review scores
Publication	Score
1Up.com	B+
Edge	6/10
Electronic Gaming Monthly	8.5/10
Eurogamer	8/10
Game Informer	8/10
GameSpot	7.5/10
GameTrailers	8.2/10
IGN	9/10
Official Xbox Magazine (US)	8/10
PC Gamer (UK)	74%

Over its first two months on sale, Reckoning sold over 400,000 copies not counting digital sales, a figure referred to by NPD Group as impressive. In the United Kingdom during its first week, the game reached the top of sales charts, surpassing the previous lead Final Fantasy XIII-2. By July 2012, the game had sold 1.3 million copies worldwide; this surpassed Electronic Arts' sales projections, and was highlighted a contributor to the company's profits in the first half of 2012. Despite this, it underperformed for 38 Studios, which had needed over two million copies in sales to turn a profit. Revenue went almost entirely towards repaying Electronic Arts's loan to the developer, and negative comments surrounding its sales and the troubles of 38 Studios at the time were partly blamed for the publisher's collapse later that year.

The game received "favorable" reviews on all platforms according to the review aggregation website Metacritic. The consensus among critics was generally positive, with many highlighting its gameplay and graphic design, but feeling it did little new to the genre. The narrative was either praised for its scale and themes, or faulted for its use of fantasy tropes. A recurring gameplay complaint, despite being mechanically sound, was a lack of depth to its systems. When mentioned, the audio was praised. Occasional technical issues were also noted across the console versions.

Joystiq's Richard Mitchell, giving the game a perfect score, lauded it despite noting some issues with repetitive quest design and skills lacking meaning. Colin Moriarty of IGN called Reckoning a contender for 2012 game of the year awards due to its narrative scope and gameplay design, with his main complaints being artistic inconsistencies and technical issues. Thierry Nguyen of 1Up.com said Reckoning "stands as a triumph" due to its enjoyable structure and technical achievements from a first-time studio. Oli Welsh of Eurogamer lauded the combat system and enjoyed the art design and secondary customization systems, but felt the conventional world building let the experience down. Mike Sharkey of GameSpy praised the overall design, but noted a lack of both combat difficulty and true openness in the world. Tom Senior of PC Gamer UK felt the story was undermined by a lack of real choice while giving praise to the combat, while Ryan Taljdnick of PlayStation: The Official Magazine lauded the variety of combat options and the design of Amalur.

GameSpot's Kevin VanOrd disliked the world and quest design, but otherwise lauded the art and gameplay design for both the console and Windows versions. Jason Wilson of Official Xbox Magazine praised the customization afforded by the gameplay system and enjoyed the story, but felt some systems were worthless and negatively compared the art style to World of Warcraft. Brandon Justice, writing for Electronic Gaming Monthly, felt the game was competent at its various systems, but due to incorporating so many did not execute any with depth. Phil Kollar of Game Informer felt Reckoning was a well-designed game worth playing, though felt the static world design and lack of original features meant it did not stand out within the genre. GameTrailers described the combat and class system as the game's strengths, being mixed on the narrative and art design. James Stephanie Sterling, writing for Destructoid, noted that the game was enjoyable and expansive for genre players despite lacking original features. Edge was mixed about the experience, enjoying the art design and narrative themes, but faulting a lack of depth in its game design and combat due to the streamlining of systems.

== Re-Reckoning ==
Kingdoms of Amalur: Re-Reckoning
- Developer: Kaiko
- Publisher: THQ Nordic
- Writer: Andrew Auseon
- Composer: Grant Kirkhope
- Platforms: PlayStation 4; Windows; Xbox One; Nintendo Switch
- Release: PlayStation 4, Windows, Xbox One: WW: September 8, 2020; Nintendo Switch: WW: March 16, 2021
- Genre: Action role-playing
- Mode: Single-player

Kingdoms of Amalur: Re-Reckoning is a remaster developed by Kaiko and published by THQ Nordic. Re-Reckoning was released for PlayStation 4, Windows and Xbox One on September 8, 2020. A Nintendo Switch port was released on March 16, 2021. Both versions included all previous DLC content, with the Switch version notably including all content on the game cartridge. Six software patches to address bugs and glitches were released between September 2020 and June 2021.

Assets and property rights for Reckoning and the rest of the Amalur property were sold to THQ Nordic in 2018, who later commented that a re-release of Reckoning required permission from co-publisher Electronic Arts. THQ Nordic executive Reinhard Pollice was a fan of the game, and hoped to bring it to prominence in the modern gaming market. Developer Kaiko had previously handled other THQ Nordic remasters including the first two Darksiders games. In addition to improving the game's graphics, the development team also wanted to improve the game's performance. After going through player feedback, it was also decided to rebalance the gameplay progression and loot distribution, and add a new higher difficulty level.

Re-Reckoning saw an exclusive expansion titled Fatesworn. Kaiko were described as enthusiastic about Fatesworn's development, consulting with former staff members about its design. Auseon returned as lead writer and narrative designer, while Kirkhope was brought back to compose new music. The expansion was described as being mostly new, though it used "loose ideas that [the team] picked up" from the original development. The team needed to create new editing tools and production pipeline, with these and working with the existing game environment causing production delays with the expansion. The expansion was released on December 14, 2021 for PS4, Xbox One and Windows. An arena mode tied to the expansion was released on December 23, unlocking exclusive rewards and challenge fights. The Switch version was delayed from its original 2022 release due to quality concerns, eventually releasing on March 12, 2023.

All versions of Re-Reckoning were given scores equating to "mixed or average" reviews from Metacritic. Jon Ryan of IGN felt that while still a solid game, several of its elements had aged over time and were outdated compared to more recent titles. RPG Site's Adam Vitale called Re-Reckoning "a good introduction to a universe that doesn't have any other entries", while PJ O'Reilly of Nintendo Life felt the game was both lacking in depth and showing its age. John Rairdin of Nintendo World Report called the game " an enthralling, though flawed, adventure that perfectly encapsulates a very specific era in game design history." The initial versions were criticised for technical issues not present in the original and a lack of graphical upgrades, while the Switch version was seen as a serviceable port.
