= Ostrovačice =

- Market town
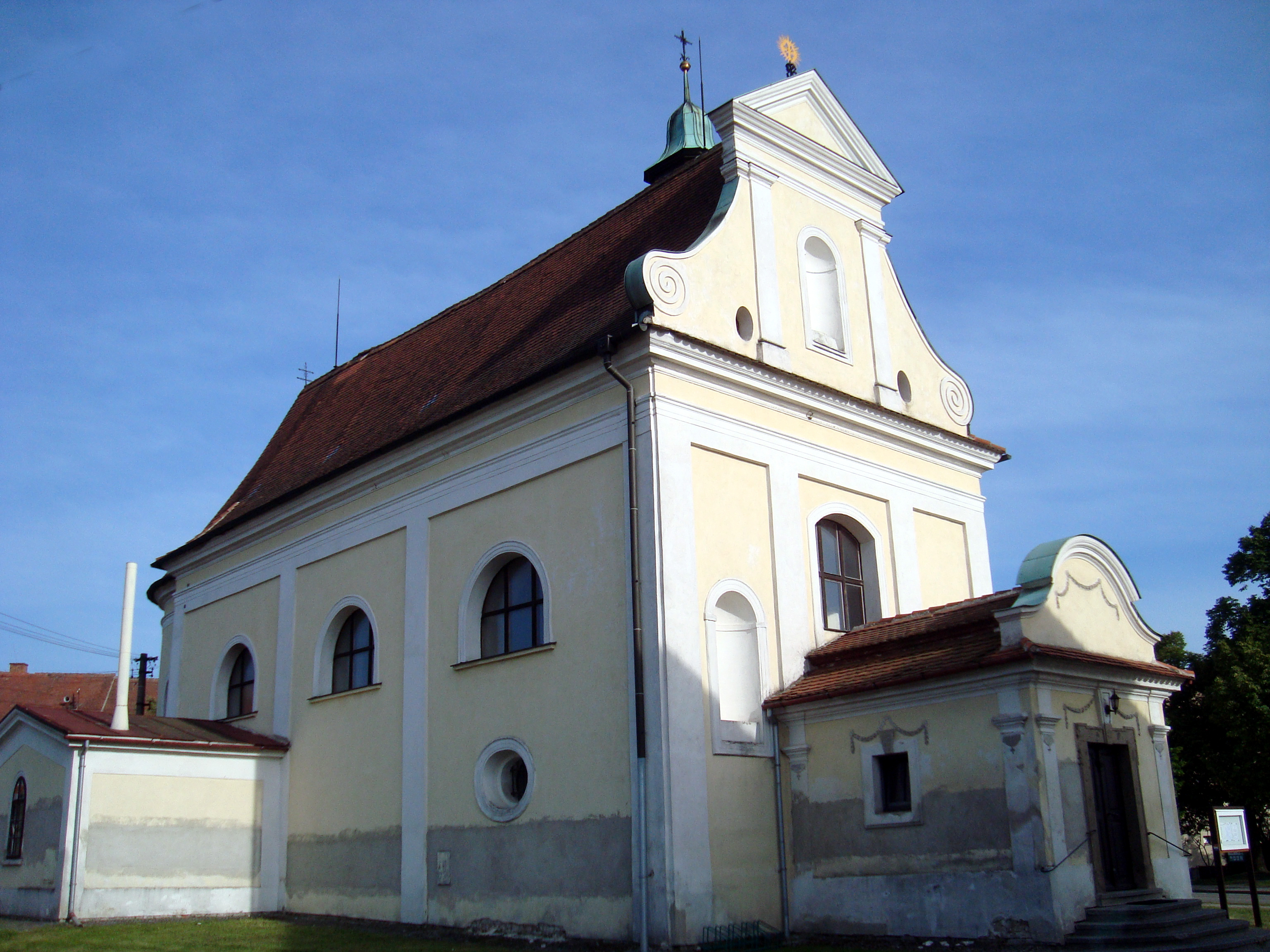
- Church of Saints John the Baptist and Wenceslaus

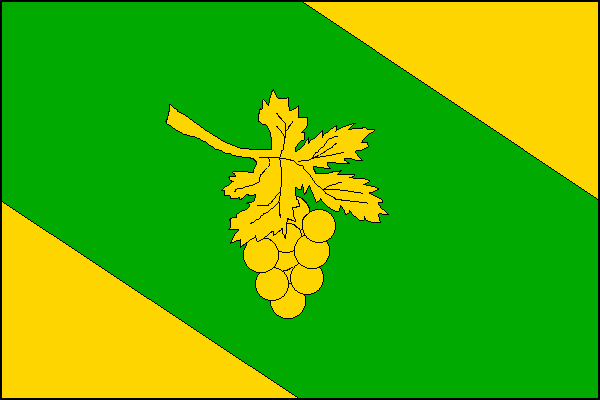
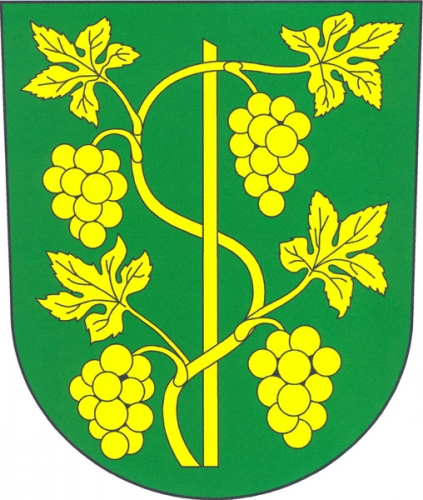
- Flag Coat of arms

- Location in the Czech Republic
- Coordinates: 49°12′39″N 16°24′34″E
- Country: Czech Republic
- Region: South Moravian
- District: Brno-Country
- First mentioned: 1255

Area
  - Total: 7.80 km^{2} (3.01 sq mi)
- Elevation: 330 m (1,080 ft)

Population (2026-01-01)
  - Total: 849
  - Density: 109/km^{2} (282/sq mi)
- Time zone: UTC+1 (CET)
  - Summer (DST): UTC+2 (CEST)
- Postal code: 664 81
- Website: www.ostrovacice.eu

Ostrovačice (Czech pronunciation: [ˈostrovatʃɪtsɛ]; German: Schwarzkirchen) is a market town in Brno-Country District in the South Moravian Region of the Czech Republic. It has about 800 inhabitants.

== Etymology ==
The name is derived from the personal name Ostrovák and was written as Ozstrovachovic (Ostrovákovice) in the oldest documents. The Latin name Nigra ecclesia and the German name Schwarzkirchen first appeared in the 1330s and mean 'black church'.

== Geography ==
Ostrovačice is located about 14 kilometres (9 mi) west of Brno. The western part of the municipal territory with the built-up area lies in the Boskovice Furrow. The eastern part lies in the Bobrava Highlands and includes the highest point of Ostrovačice at 450 m (1,480 ft) above sea level.

== History ==
The first written mention of Ostrovačice is from 1255. It was promoted to a market town by Ferdinand I of Austria in 1842.

== Demographics ==
Historical population

Year	Pop.	±%
1869	639	—
1880	580	−9.2%
1890	624	+7.6%
1900	664	+6.4%
1910	706	+6.3%

Year	Pop.	±%
1921	693	−1.8%
1930	644	−7.1%
1950	642	−0.3%
1961	675	+5.1%
1970	618	−8.4%

Year	Pop.	±%
1980	581	−6.0%
1991	568	−2.2%
2001	575	+1.2%
2011	635	+10.4%
2021	789	+24.3%

Source: Censuses

== Transport ==
The D1 motorway from Prague to Brno runs through the municipal territory.

== Sport ==
A part of the Brno Circuit is situated in the territory of Ostrovačice.

== Sights ==
The main landmark of Ostrovačice is the Church of Saints John the Baptist and Wenceslaus. It is originally a Romanesque church from the mid-13th century, rebuilt in the Baroque style in 1718–1719. Neoclassical and historicist modifications were made in 1803 and 1880.

== Notable people ==
- Zdeněk Pololáník (1935–2024), composer and organist; lived and worked here
