= Shorpy =

Shorpy may refer to:

- Shorpy.com
- Shorpy Higginbotham
