= Dishonored: Death of the Outsider =

2017 video game

- Developer: Arkane Lyon
- Publisher: Bethesda Softworks
- Director: Harvey Smith
- Designer: Dinga Bakaba
- Programmer: Hugues Tardif
- Artist: Sébastien Mitton
- Writers: Sachka Duval; Sophie Mallinson; Anna Megill; Hazel Monforton
- Composer: Daniel Licht
- Series: Dishonored
- Platforms: PlayStation 4; Windows; Xbox One
- Release: 15 September 2017
- Genres: Action-adventure, stealth
- Mode: Single-player

Dishonored: Death of the Outsider is a 2017 action-adventure game developed by Arkane Lyon and published by Bethesda Softworks. It is a standalone expansion pack following Dishonored 2, and was released 15 September 2017 for PlayStation 4, Windows, and Xbox One. The game takes place in the coastal city of Karnaca after the events of the previous title. It follows the former assassin Billie Lurk (voiced by Rosario Dawson) as she reunites with her mentor Daud (Michael Madsen) to kill the mysterious entity known as The Outsider (Robin Lord Taylor). The game is played from a first-person perspective and the player has access to a variety of supernatural abilities to complete missions in a multitude of ways, from stealth to purposeful violent conflict.

Death of the Outsider was originally planned as a downloadable content for Dishonored 2, but became a standalone expansion after the team decided to explore different approaches with its story and gameplay. Lurk was chosen as the protagonist for being a favorite with the developers. The narrative was conceived to tie loose ends left by the previous games, offer a different perspective to the player, and end the narrative arc that began with Dishonored. Gameplay elements were reformulated or removed to differentiate the game from its predecessors, adapt it to the standalone expansion format and encourage the player to experiment and explore their choices.

The game was announced during the Bethesda press conference at E3 2017. Death of the Outsider was well received by critics, who praised its game design and considered it a suitable conclusion to the Dishonored series up until that point. However, criticism was focused on its narrative and levels which were considered unremarkable when compared to previous titles in the series. The game was nominated for some industry awards, including Outstanding Achievement in Videogame Writing at the Writers Guild of America Awards. After its release, Arkane Studios announced that the Dishonored series would be entering a hiatus.

== Gameplay ==
The gameplay is similar to Dishonored and Dishonored 2. The player character Billie Lurk is equipped with a short sword. If the player sneaks up on a foe, they can stab them to death quickly and quietly. The player has other gear, such as a wrist-mounted crossbow, land mines, and grenades. A new item is the hook mine, which grabs a nearby enemy and knocks them unconscious, or they can be set to kill.

After the first mission, the player gains access to three supernatural abilities. Unlike previous games in the series, the player does not purchase them with "runes"; they are all fully unlocked from the start. These abilities cost energy to use, but unlike in the previous games, the player's energy regenerates fully on its own; there are no consumables to replenish energy.

Lurk's main mobility power is "Displace", which allows her to set a marker in the world, and teleport to that marker when in eyesight of it. "Semblance" allows the player to take the faces of living non-player characters (NPCs) and use them as a temporary disguise, though they can only take a character's face once. The disguise drains power as the player moves, but not when they are standing still. Using Semblance on specific named NPCs may produce unique interactions. Completing the game unlocks an "original game plus" mode, where the player has access to some powers featured in Dishonored 2. As in the previous games, the player can collect "bonecharms", which are scattered throughout the levels. Wearing a bonecharm provides minor upgrades to the player's abilities.

During missions, the player may pick up optional "Contracts" at black markets, which are side missions that involve doing tasks such as assassinating another character. In one example, the character is tasked with killing a mime and making it look like a suicide.

== Plot ==
After the events of Dishonored 2, Emily Kaldwin is reinstated as empress and begins to salvage the Empire previously broken by Delilah's rule. Billie Lurk wakes aboard her ship, the Dreadful Wale, having a recurring nightmare regarding her right arm and eye. Billie has tracked down her old mentor Daud's whereabouts to a boxing club in Albarca Baths. She makes her way there, finding that the boxing club is run by a Void-worshiping cult called the Eyeless.

Billie witnesses Daud restrained by a device that cancels out his supernatural powers. She disables the device, freeing Daud. Daud is happy to see Billie and asks for her help in killing the Outsider, to which Billie agrees. On the Dreadful Wale, Daud explains that the Eyeless are in possession of a ritual knife that was originally used to create the Outsider thousands of years prior. Daud believes that the knife can be used to kill the Outsider. Billie is visited by the Outsider, who replaces her right arm and eye, granting her supernatural abilities.

Billie investigates the leadership of the Eyeless. She discovers that the knife is contained in a safety deposit box in Karnaca's largest bank, and steals the keys to the deposit box from the Eyeless' leaders. Billie infiltrates the bank and steals the knife, upon which the Outsider appears and reveals that Daud has died of natural causes aboard the Dreadful Wale, to her dismay. She returns to the ship and burns it down, cremating Daud's body.

Billie infiltrates the Royal Conservatory, where a former Eyeless leader had hidden important documents. They detail the location of a Void portal at an abandoned mine outside Karnaca. Billie travels to the mine, which is overseen and operated by the cult that created the Outsider. Billie learns from their notes that the Mark of the Outsider is actually his name, written in an esoteric script that only the dead can read. Billie makes her way to an artifact called "the Eye of the Dead God" and absorbs it, allowing her to safely enter the Void portal.

Inside the Void, Billie makes her way to the Ritual Hold, where the Outsider resides. There she finds him bound and immobile. Billie can then either return the Outsider to the mortal realm by having Daud's spirit pronounce his real name, or use the ritual knife to kill him. Either way, the Outsider is displaced, and Billie acknowledges that with the Outsider gone, the world will be changed, as there is no longer anybody who can decide who will receive the Void's power.

== Development ==
Dinga Bakaba, lead designer of Dishonored 2, was one of the initial people arguing for making the Death of the Outsider a standalone title. The game removes the chaos system featured in previous games, which tracked how many characters the player killed and altered the world depending on if the player had a high bodycount. Developers felt that removing the need to find elixirs, which were previously required to fully restore energy, encouraged players to experiment more with the full range of powers. Giving all the powers at once was "liberating" for Arkane, as they knew the full extent of what any player could do at any point in the game. Time restraints meant that levels could not all be "themed" in the same way Dishonored 2's levels were, though some levels are intended to make the player rely on different powers than others. Co-creative director Harvey Smith had concerns about the Semblance power when it was pitched, as he felt implementing the idea appropriately would take an excessive amount of work; ultimately the full extent and ramifications of the power were reduced to more "manageable" levels, and Smith was glad for its inclusion.

Hazel Monforton, one of the writers for Death of the Outsider, was hired by Arkane after posting an analysis of the Outsider in Dishonored 2 via Twitter thread, comparing the Outsider's death to the Ancient Greek ritual of pharmakos. She was eventually, according to her portfolio, brought onboard permanently as a narrative designer.

Death of the Outsider is meant to bring an end to "the Kaldwin era", an arc that began in the first Dishonored with the assassination of Jessamine Kaldwin and followed characters involved with it, such as Corvo Attano and Emily Kaldwin. Whether any future Dishonored games will be made is undecided, but they would feature different characters as their protagonists.

== Reception ==
Reception

Aggregate score
Aggregator	Score
Metacritic	PC: 81/100; PS4: 82/100; XONE: 84/100

Review scores
Publication	Score
GameSpot	8/10
IGN	8.4/10

IGN's Tom Marks considered it "a worthy end", but felt it did not reach the "high bar" of Dishonored 2. Marks praised the "wonderfully detailed" levels and the encouragement to use abilities more liberally, though expressed mixed feelings at the removal of the Chaos system and lack of character progression. Alessandro Fillari at GameSpot gave the game a positive review, praising the level design and individual missions, while also criticizing the story, stating that "while starting strong, the story eventually runs out of steam".

GamesRadar+ ranked it 19th on their list of the 25 Best Games of 2017.

The game was nominated for Best Expansion in PC Gamer's 2017 Game of the Year Awards.

=== Accolades ===
Year	Award	Category	Result	Ref.
2017	Ping Awards	Best Console Game	Nominated	
2017	Ping Awards	Best PC Game	Won	
2017	Ping Awards	Best Graphics	Nominated	
2017	Ping Awards	Best Screenplay	Nominated	
2017	Ping Awards	Best Soundtrack	Nominated	
2018	Writers Guild of America Awards 2017	Outstanding Achievement in Videogame Writing	Nominated	
2018	National Academy of Video Game Trade Reviewers Awards	Art Direction, Period Influence	Nominated	
