= The Outsider (Dishonored) =

Fictional supernatural being

- Dishonored character
- The Outsider as he appears in Dishonored 2
- First appearance: "The Hand that Feeds" (The Tales from Dunwall, 2012)
- First game: Dishonored (2012)
- Last appearance: Death of the Outsider (2017)
- Created by: Arkane Studios
- Voiced by: Billy Lush (Dishonored); Robin Lord Taylor (Dishonored 2, Dishonored: Death of the Outsider)

The Outsider is a fictional supernatural being in Arkane Studios' Dishonored franchise, residing in an empty otherworldly dimension called the Void. After appearing in promotional webisodes, the character made his game debut in Dishonored (2012), where he grants magical powers to the player character. He serves a similar role in the game's sequel, Dishonored 2 (2016), though he may be rejected. The Outsider reappears in Dishonored: Death of the Outsider (2017), which follows former-assassin Billie Lurk as she attempts to kill him, though his ultimate fate is up to the player.

Within the series, the Outsider is one of many representations of the Void that have existed, and was originally a street urchin before being sacrificed by a cult. Voiced by Billy Lush in the first game, the actor was replaced by Robin Lord Taylor from Dishonored 2 onwards.

The character has often been viewed as a sort of trickster god, though director Harvey Smith has denied this interpretation. His sacrifice drew comparisons with the ancient Greek pharmakos by one writer, who would be brought to work on Death of the Outsider. Others commented on the Outsider and the Void as figures of choice, or related them to the open-ended gameplay of the series. The character has been praised by some critics, though he received negative reception from others.

== Appearances ==
=== Dishonored (2012) ===
In the lead-up to Dishonored's release, the Outsider was introduced in more detail in The Tales from Dunwall, a series of webisodes giving more information on the game's lore. "The Hand that Feeds", the second episode, tells of one character the Outsider gifted powers to. An unnamed boy is ostracized and beaten by the other boys he knows, his only friend a white rat. One night while the boy is hiding in an alley, the Outsider appears and grants the boy his mark. Emboldened by his new powers, the boy finds his "tormentors" and uses the mark to unleash a swarm of rats over them, but one of the rats bites him in the process and infects him with the plague. In his last days, succumbing to the sickness, the boy searches in vain for the Outsider to thank him, as he "would no longer have to live in fear, for what little life he had left".

The Outsider then made his game debut in Dishonored, voiced by Billy Lush. In Dishonored, the player plays as Corvo Attano, bodyguard to the Empress. After the Empress is murdered and her daughter Emily kidnapped by Daud, an assassin marked by the Outsider, Corvo is framed for her murder by the new Lord Regent. Corvo escapes six months after and joins with the Loyalists, who wish to rescue the Empress's daughter, use Corvo to systematically eliminate the Lord Regent's core allies and then the Regent himself, then restore Emily to the throne. The night after Corvo meets the Loyalists, the Outsider visits Corvo in a dream and marks him, granting him magical powers. He also gifts Corvo a living heart, which gives him the secrets of anyone it's pointed at. If the player finds shrines to the Outsider during the game's missions, the Outsider will discuss Corvo's current mission and his choices during it.

The Outsider kickstarts the story of The Knife of Dunwall and The Brigmore Witches, the game's downloadable content, where he first informs Daud of "Delilah"; this leads Daud to begin investigating her and then work on thwarting her plans. Like in the main game, the player find his shrines across the levels, whereupon the Outsider will comment on Daud and the player's choices so far.

=== Dishonored 2 (2016) ===
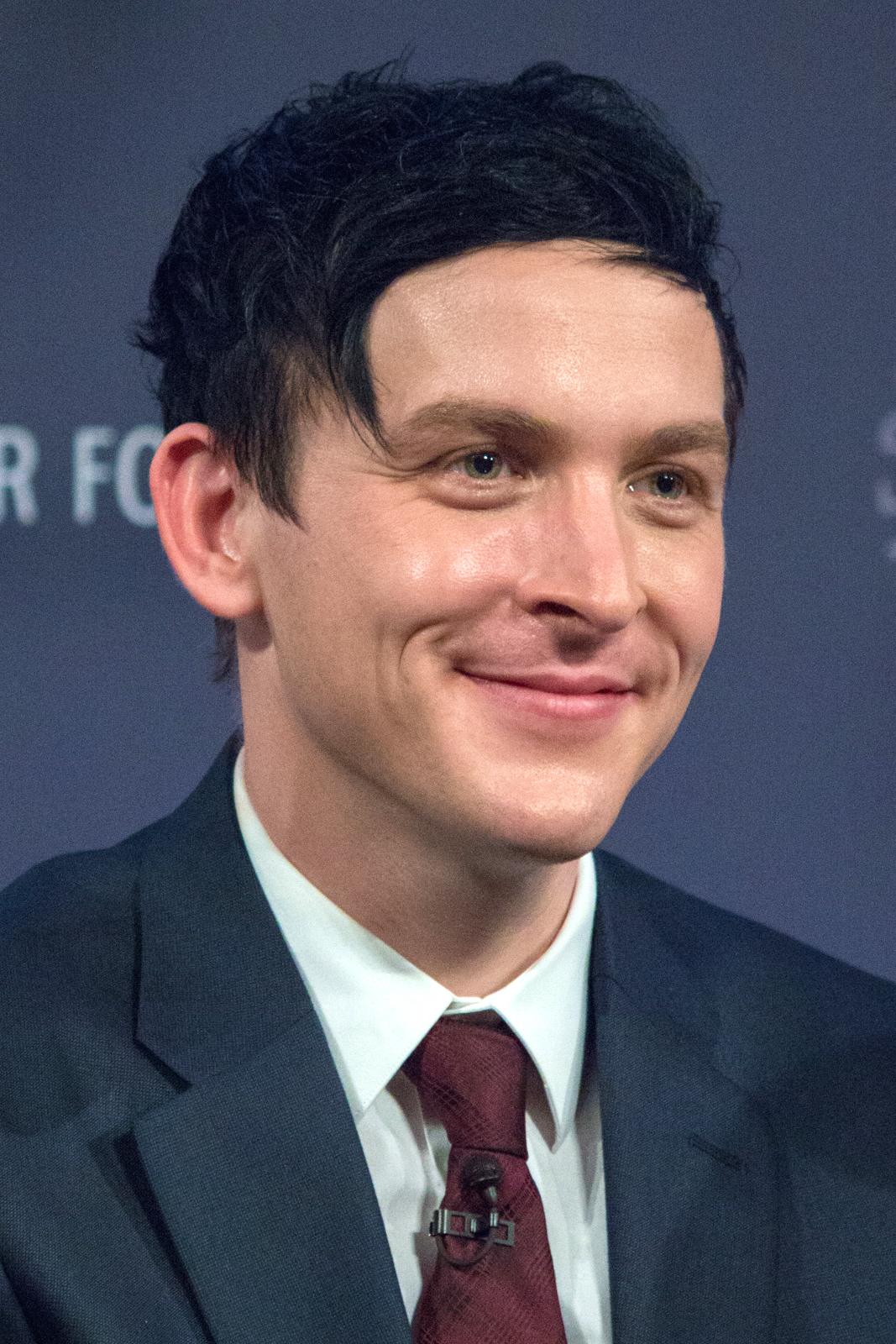
Robin Lord Taylor voices the Outsider in Dishonored 2 and Death of the Outsider, replacing Billy Lush in the role.

For Dishonored 2, artists looked again at the Outsider, making slight alterations to some details and giving him a more balanced silhouette. Robin Lord Taylor replaced Lush as the voice of the character. Lush appeared in the Dishonored 2 reveal trailer, but has said he did not receive any further calls about the role afterwards. The character was Taylor's first role in a video game, as well as his first outside of live-action. Taylor was not familiar with the game beforehand, but studied Lush's "amazing" performance in preparation of the role and was given detailed information on the character and the world by Arkane.

Dishonored 2 takes place 15 years after the events of the first game, and in it the player can choose to play as either Corvo Attano or Empress Emily Kaldwin. The throne is usurped by the witch Delilah, who strips Corvo of the Outsider's mark and turns the character the player hasn't chosen to stone. After they make their escape, the Outsider approaches the player character in a dream. Unlike the first game, the player can choose to either accept or reject the Mark and powers the Outsider offers. Regardless he again gifts the player the heart from the first game, this time explicitly containing the spirit of Empress Jessamine, Emily's mother and Corvo's lover.

The Outsider appears a few more times throughout the game, at shrines and at one point where he drags the player into the Void to give them more information on Delilah. During this time, he recounts how he was tied down and sacrificed against his will to become "a god". At the ending, the Outsider narrates the outcome of various choices the player made during the game.

=== Death of the Outsider (2017) ===
Death of the Outsider was intended to bring the initial story arc of the Dishonored games, following the Outsider and the aftereffects of the Empress's assassination, to a close. The game follows Billie Lurk on a quest to kill the Outsider at the behest of an aged Daud, her former mentor. After rescuing Daud from the clutches of a cult devoted to worshipping the Outsider, Daud tells Billie of his plan to kill the "black-eyed bastard". That night the Outsider visits her in a dream, forcibly replacing her arm and left-eye with Void-touched substitutes which grant her magical abilities. Billie searches for the knife used to originally sacrifice the Outsider, which is carefully guarded by the cult and may be used to kill him. After she finds it, the Outsider informs her that Daud has passed away.

Billie tracks the cult to an isolated mountain that leaks physically into the Void. There she finds the Outsider's physical presence, carefully guarded by cultists and encased in stone, surrounded by Daud and other dead spirits wandering the Void. The player may choose to kill the Outsider here. Alternatively, they may discover that the Outsider's mark is actually his forgotten name, written in the language of the dead and taken from him by the ritual that made him a god; if given back, this name will undo the ritual and turn the Outsider human once more. The player may then instead convince Daud to forgive the Outsider and whisper the Outsider his name, setting him free to live a new life. In the epilogue, Billie muses that without the Outsider there is no one to choose who will or won't be touched by the Void's magic.

Harvery Smith felt the killer of the Outsider should lack his mark, which was part of why Billie was chosen as protagonist. How to achieve the non-lethal ending, in which the Outsider is restored to human form, was something that received a lot of debate and suggestions within Arkane. Sandra Duval, lead narrative designer and co-creative director of the game, proposed whispering him his name. The non-lethal option was intended to stress that Arkane viewed the Outsider as "a tragic figure". Writer Hazel Monforton described part of the Outsider's story being "learning to hope again" after expecting the worst in previous games, while writer Anna Megill said: "In a game that explores what redemption looks like, it would be wrong to end the Outsider without giving him the chance that others had." The lethal ending, meanwhile, was originally much more abrupt; the final game gives time for the player to ruminate on his demise.

== Character and analysis ==
Within the context of the Dishonored universe, the Outsider is a representation of the Void. The Void is eternal, though "every few thousands of years" it has an avatar that watches over it. The Outsider himself is not the first god to act as such a representation, nor may he necessarily be the last. He was originally a "vulnerable" street urchin, until he was found by a cult, kidnapped and ritually sacrificed to turn him into what he is now. As a god, he appears as a young man with iris-less, black eyes. A religious order known as the Abbey of the Everyman work to oppose the Outsider, magic and witchcraft.

Gaming critic Robert Rath compared the Outsider to Satan in the Book of Job, considering the Outsider as a tempter figure who provides Corvo with the power that may ultimately "doom" both him and Dunwall. Rath notes the most violent powers the Outsider provides Corvo are the "most effective, visually striking and fun", and sees him as silently encouraging Corvo to give into his baser instincts. The Heart, meanwhile, often "spoonfeeds" Corvo the justifications for killing the people he comes across, easily leading to a slippery slope justified by faux-"righteousness". Rath supports this position with how other characters gifted by the Outsider—Daud, Granny Rags, Piero—all seem headed for "a bad end", destabilizing Dunwall in the progress. Jeff Howard considered the Outsider a "trickster figure" whose "moral Otherness" from the rest of Dunwall society allowed the magic of the franchise's world to be an "amoral force", whose uses are left up to the player. Frank G. Bosman sees the Outsider as a "morally neutral" figure whose ties to the Biblical Leviathan represent an association with the primal chaos before creation. With the Outsider as a figure of "chaos and anarchy" whose grace is "arbitrary", the Abbey in opposition to him fight for "order, discipline, separation and rationality", and more negatively "for the inclination of domination and control"—thereby themselves becoming complicit in the oppression of the common people by Dunwall's elite.

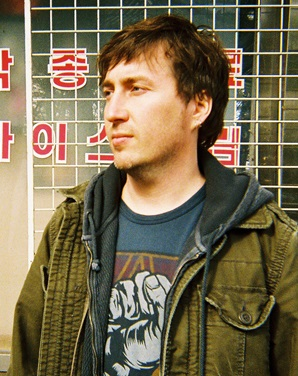
Game director Harvey Smith, 2006

Harvey Smith denied interpretations that the Outsider was a trickster god, or that he was completely "amoral" or "indifferent". Dishonored 2 intended to detail more of his backstory, with Smith describing him as someone who "suffered great abuse" before becoming the Outsider and now "struggles to maintain some sort of human consciousness". Ricardo Bare, lead technical designer of the first Dishonored, acknowledged the Outsider had done things that reminded people of trickster gods, but preferred to relate him to the Jungian shadow self. He commented that the Outsider had qualities "which represent the unconscious, mystery, secret or repressed desires, creativity, etc." Elsewhere, Smith has called the Outsider an "observer character". Arkane had tried to make the character come across as sarcastic, though found difficulties where players would misread the character and take his lines as sincere endorsements.

Hazel Monforton, writing for PC Gamer, used the Outsider's sacrifice to compare him to the ancient Greek social ritual, the pharmakos. For her comments on the character, Monforton was brought to work on Death of the Outsider. GamesRadar's Alex Avard considered the ending of Death of the Outsider to "shatter all of our preconceived notions" by revealing him to be an "incarcerated victim" rather than a "machiavellian villain". On the third game's ending, The A.V. Club's Matt Gerardi commented: "[The Outsider]'s the ultimate symbol of the abuse that Dishonored's many monstrous characters perform and a reminder that [...] humanity's inclination to do evil to each other is a far greater threat than some unknowable agent".

Bit-Tech's Joe Martin, meanwhile, compared the Outsider to the design team and Corvo to the player: "It could be like giving a handgun to a toddler or a textbook to a genius—and Arkane/The Outsider are merchants of mischief, desperate to find out which". Jim Rossignol of Rock Paper Shotgun echoed the comparison, calling Dishonored "an elegy to the art required to create it". In response to a comparison between the Outsider and the developer, director Harvey Smith did comment that the team "joked" that the Outsider's responses, though not fourth-wall breaking, were directed at the player themselves. Taylor described the character as "in many ways" "the narrator of this experience". Art director Sébastien Mitton called the Outsider a twisted projection of the player, giving this as a reason for the character's "androgynous" look. Javy Gwaltney, for Game Informer, wrote that the Outsider was "an embodiment of what Dishonored is all about: an intersection between our choices and our identity, a celebration of the flexible design of immersive sims themselves, and the responsibility that comes with great power". Eurogamer's Andreas Inderwildi felt that inherent in the act of playing the game, the player "align[ed]" themself with the Outsider and the Void: "Its openness, flexibility and emergent design mean that you cannot help but act like the Outsider who sees many paths where others see just one".

== Reception ==
The character has received criticism. In their reviews of the first game, Kill Screen called the character "severely undercharacterized" and called Billy Lush "half-asleep" in the role, and Giant Bomb felt the mystery behind him was never satisfyingly explained. Rock Paper Shotgun writers together criticized the character. Jim Rossignol praised the mythology behind him, but called the Outsider himself "a bit... teen vampire?" They speculated that other Outsider details were being saved for sequels, though Adam Smith felt the Outsider worked well "as a suggestion", sentiments agreed by Alec Meer and Rossignol, though they wished the character was more something "implied" rather than someone the players met. Kirk Hamilton of Kotaku contrasted him unfavorably to the Lutece twins from BioShock Infinite, similar characters in a "mysterious stranger" role. For his appearance in Dishonored 2, Meer commented that the Outsider was even "worse", calling him "arguably the least convincing element of Dishonored". In the lead-up to Death of the Outsider's release, Rock Paper Shotgun's Adam Smith criticized the character and wrote how he would be glad to kill him. Smith called the character "condescending and smug", and felt that the more fantastical elements of the Dishonored world were "a distraction" from the rest of the series' "grungy reality and messy class conflicts".

Not all critical response to the character was negative. Brenna Hillier described the Outsider as their favorite part of the Dishonored universe, praising the game's ability to show off "real ambiguity" and the many ways the Outsider could react to the player. Hillier commented on the differing fan depictions and readings of the character, from lovable scamp to devil figure, calling the Outsider "delightfully ambiguous and open to interpretation". Javy Gwaltney argued that the Outsider was "one of gaming's greatest characters". In his review for Death of the Outsider, however, Gwaltney criticized the Outsider's "habit" of popping up throughout Death "with frustratingly dull philosophy 101 questions".

Describing the character as a "returning favorite", Polygon's Allegra Frank reported on a divide between fans on the character's recast, quoting comments supportive of the old voice that questioned how well the new take fit with the character. Jeremy Peel of PCGamesN defended Taylor's casting in response to fan complaints that the character sounded too young, with the argument that the Outsider was an "adolescent god"; Peel wrote that Lush had also not given the character "thespian gravity" and instead "also sounded young—and more than that, human".
