= Dishonored 2 =

2016 video game

- Developer: Arkane Lyon
- Publisher: Bethesda Softworks
- Director: Harvey Smith
- Designer: Dinga Bakaba
- Programmer: Hugues Tardif
- Artist: Sébastien Mitton
- Writers: Sandra Duval; Terri Brosius; Austin Grossman
- Composer: Daniel Licht
- Series: Dishonored
- Engine: Void Engine
- Platforms: PlayStation 4; Windows; Xbox One
- Release: 11 November 2016
- Genres: Action-adventure, stealth
- Mode: Single-player

Dishonored 2 is a 2016 first person action-adventure game developed by Arkane Lyon and published by Bethesda Softworks for PlayStation 4, Windows, and Xbox One. It is the sequel to 2012's Dishonored. After Empress Emily Kaldwin is deposed by the witch Delilah Copperspoon, the player may choose between playing as either Emily or her father/Royal Protector Corvo Attano as they attempt to reclaim the throne. Emily and Corvo each employ their own array of supernatural abilities, though the player can opt not to use these abilities at all. Due to the game's nonlinear gameplay, there are a multitude of ways to complete missions, from non-lethal stealth to purposeful violent conflict.

Ideas for Dishonored 2 began while developing the downloadable content of its predecessor, which spawned the decision to create a voice for Corvo Attano after being a silent character in the first installment. The advancement of the timeline was brought about once Emily Kaldwin, a child in Dishonored, was proposed as a playable character. The game's aesthetic was influenced by paintings, sculptures, architecture, fashion, and technologies around the year 1851; set in the fictional city of Karnaca, based on the Cypriot city of Larnaca, it also drew inspiration from other Mediterranean countries like Greece, Italy, and Spain. Voice actors include Rosario Dawson, Sam Rockwell, Robin Lord Taylor, Jamie Hector, Pedro Pascal, and Vincent D'Onofrio.

Dishonored 2 received positive reviews. Praise went to the improvements made since the first game such as more challenging stealth, the adaptability of Emily and Corvo's abilities to both play styles, the creative design of individual missions, the realization of the game's world, and the artificial intelligence. Criticism was directed at the storyline's lack of focus, while the PC version became subject to technical issues at launch. The game won Best Action/Adventure Game at the 2016 Game Awards and Costume Design at the 2017 NAVGTR Awards. It has since become regarded as one of the greatest games ever made. A standalone sequel, Dishonored: Death of the Outsider, was released in 2017.

== Gameplay ==
In this gameplay screenshot, the player is holding a heart item which aids in the discovery of bone charms and runes.

Dishonored 2 is an action-adventure game with stealth elements played from a first-person perspective. After playing as Empress Emily Kaldwin during the prologue, players may decide to play either as Emily or as Corvo Attano, the protagonist from Dishonored, the previous game. Side missions unlock alternate methods of assassination, non-lethal approaches and paths to navigate the main mission. Both characters wield a pistol, crossbow, a retractable blade, grenades and mines—all of which are upgradable. Upgrades may be purchased at black market shops found throughout levels, and blueprints scattered throughout the environment unlock new upgrades. Coin is required to buy these upgrades, which can be found throughout levels or gained from other collectibles, like stealing paintings. Players can choose whether to play stealthily or not and can finish the game without killing anyone. Health elixirs and food consumables will restore health, while mana elixirs replenish mana.

Enemy detection works on line-of-sight, with players being able to use cover or high areas out of enemies' cones of vision to stay undetected. Darkness can aid the player in staying hidden, but it is only effective at a distance. Enemy alert meters and musical cues let the player know if they have been spotted. Noise will cause enemies to go to investigate, including noise made by broken bottles, sprinting or the player striking a sword against a wall; this may be used deliberately to lure guards into traps or disrupt their patrol route. Players can look through keyholes to help them survey a room before entering and can lean to look from cover without fully exposing themselves. The player is able to be detected if they peer out from behind a wall for too long, a feature not seen in Dishonored. To avoid detection, the player may choke people out or slit their throats. Bodies can be carried away and concealed. Alarms can be disabled to assure that enemies are not alerted to the player's presence. Walls of Light, deadly electrical barriers powered by wind or whale oil, are subject to have their power turned off or be rewired so that only enemies are killed by going through them. Whale oil canisters explode on harsh impact, and can be thrown at enemies to that end.

Dishonored 2 introduces non-lethal combat moves to throw people off-balance or knock someone unconscious—choke-holds, blocks, pushes, kicks, crouch-slides, drops from high up, sleep darts, stun mines, and various supernatural abilities—and features the chaos system used in the first game. The player gains chaos by killing characters, representative of the player destabilizing the world. The game adds an element to the system where, at the start of a mission, random non-player characters are procedurally assigned one of three states: sympathetic, guilty, and murderous. Killing a "sympathetic" person gives the player more chaos than killing others, while in contrast killing a murderous character gives the player a lesser amount. The amount of chaos accrued affects the dialog used by Emily and Corvo and the quantity of enemies present in each given level. Further, insects called bloodflies make nests in corpses; therefore if many people are killed, there will be an increase in bloodflies. Loot can be found in the nests which, if destroyed, can be obtained. The bloodflies similarly encourage the player to hide bodies from them while on a mission. Each level in the game is intended to have a unique theme, in either fiction or game mechanic. In one level, the player is confronted with two factions each with their own assassination target, and may use the level's reoccurring dust storms for cover. In another, time distortion is introduced as the player traverses an abandoned mansion in ruins. The player is given a device that lets them glimpse three years into the past, where the mansion is still occupied and guards roam, and can shift back and forth between the two points in time.

=== Abilities and powers ===
As in the first game, the player has access to supernatural powers. These powers are optional and may be rejected. Independently from whether these supernatural powers are rejected or not, the player receives a heart item which aids in the discovery of bone charms and runes; these provide passive perks and skill points, respectively; if the powers are not accepted, runes are converted into additional coins. The heart reveals whether those the player comes across are sympathetic, guilty or murderous. Unlike the first game, the upgrading system was changed to a skill tree with multiple paths and more possible upgrades; a power may have a lethal or non-lethal upgrade. Each character has unique powers. "Dark Vision", the power that more easily identifies the player's surroundings, including where an enemy directs their gaze, is available to both. Another skill tree, applied to both playable characters, unlock more passive abilities which do not consume mana, such as the ability to run faster and jump higher, or the ability to craft bonecharms.

Corvo retains many of the powers available in the first game, though his progress in them has been reset. "Blink" teleports him to a chosen location, but in addition can be upgraded to freeze time or impart damage on impact with the momentum gained from teleportation. Corvo may summon rats with "Devouring Swarm" to clear dead bodies before bloodflies lay eggs in them. While its original use allowed Corvo to possess animals and humans, "Possession" is enhanced to take control of dead bodies as well as multiple hosts in succession. "Bend Time" can be used to slow down time, circumventing dangerous checkpoints or reaching enemies unobserved. The ability "Windblast" enables Corvo to summon a blast of wind that can deflect projectiles and push enemies off ledges. Emily has powers new to the series, including "Far Reach", which allows her to pull objects and enemies toward her and travel without physical movement by clasping onto something to propel herself forward. She can use "Mesmerize" to distract her enemies, moving them into a state of sedation. "Domino" permits Emily to connect several of her enemies together so that they share the same outcome. With "Shadow Walk", she is turned into a shadowy cloud that moves swiftly and changes tangibility at will. "Doppelganger" conjures a clone of Emily in order to misdirect her opponents, and can work alongside "Domino".

== Synopsis ==
=== Setting ===
The game takes place during the year 1851 in the Empire of the Isles, a union of four island nations under the rule of Empress Emily Kaldwin. While players begin and end the game in the capital city of Dunwall, much of the story takes place in the coastal city of Karnaca, a wealthy silver mining city and seat of power for the Duke of Serkonos, the southernmost region of the empire. Unlike Dunwall, which relies on whale oil for power, Karnaca is powered by wind turbines, though the winds coversely lead to frequent dust storms in the poorer districts of the city, especially the mining district. Additionally, while Dunwall's architecture and design is primarily influenced by Victorian-era London and Liverpool, Karnaca's aesthetic is inspired by various subtropical cities in the Mediterranean and the antebellum Deep South.

At the time the game begins, the extremist and corrupt Overseers of the Empire's state religion, the Abbey of the Everyman, are engaged in a violent conflict against the Howlers street gang for control of the populace, forcing the Grand Serkonan Guard, Karnaca's law enforcement and the Duke's personal bodyguards, to erect defensive barriers called Walls of Light as a means of maintaining order in the city.

=== Characters ===
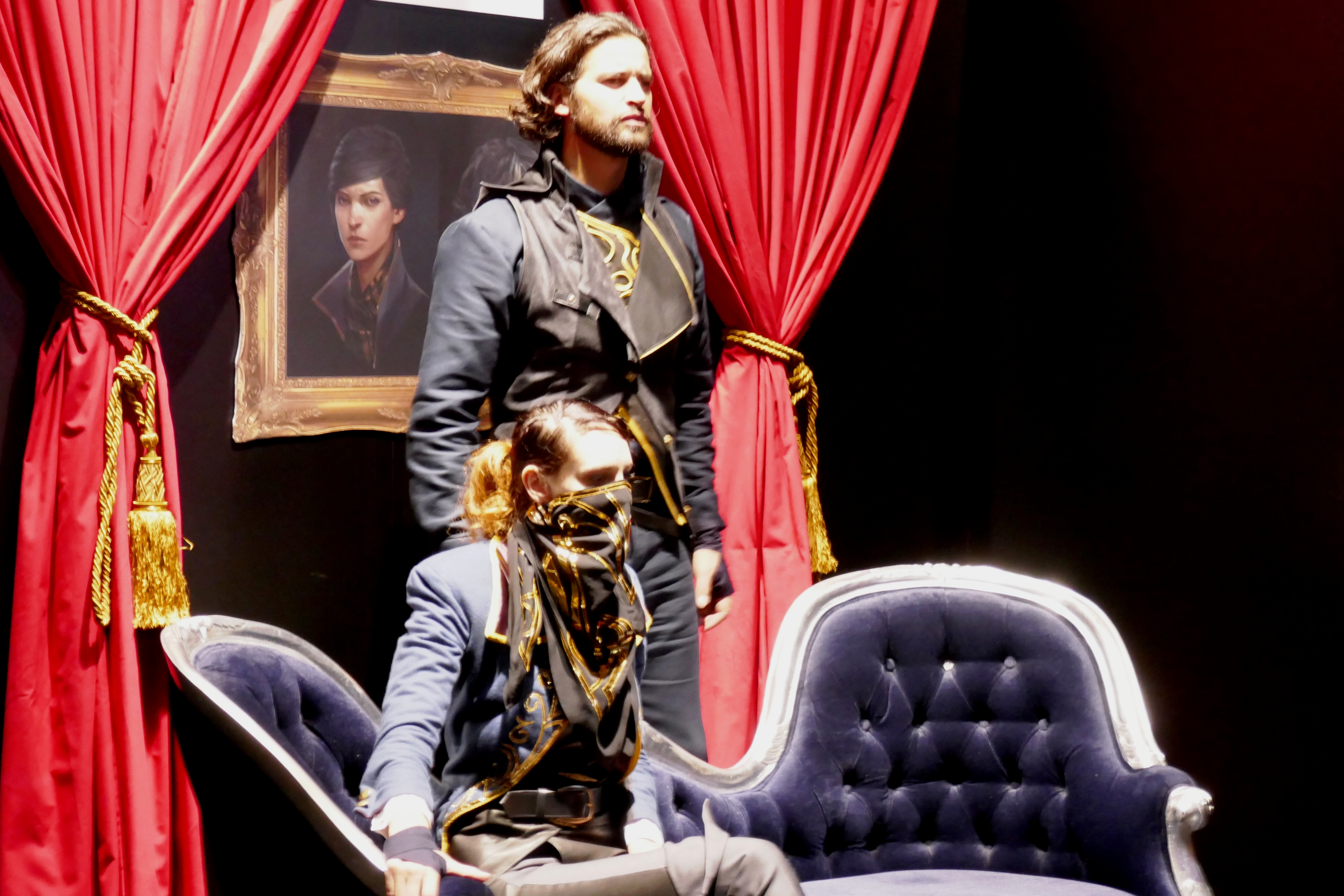
Actors portraying Corvo and Emily at Paris Games Week 2016

The main characters of Dishonored 2 that the player can control are Corvo Attano (Stephen Russell), a former bodyguard turned assassin and the main character of the previous game, and Emily Kaldwin (Erica Luttrell), Corvo's daughter and the former Empress of the Empire of the Isles. The game's main antagonists include Luca Abele (Vincent D'Onofrio), the new duke of Serkonos following the passing of his father Theodanis, and Delilah Copperspoon (Erin Cottrell), a witch and the antagonist of the previous game's downloadable content packs The Knife of Dunwall and The Brigmore Witches, as well as the half-sister of Emily's deceased mother; promotional material from the special collector's edition of the game references her as Delilah Kaldwin.

Other characters in the game include Meagan Foster (Rosario Dawson), captain of the Dreadful Wale; Paolo (Pedro Pascal), leader of the Howler gang; Mindy Blanchard (Betsy Moore), Paolo's second-in-command; Mortimer Ramsey (Sam Rockwell), a corrupt officer of the Dunwall City Watch; Liam Byrne (Jamie Hector), the Vice Overseer of Karnaca who opposes the Howlers; Anton Sokolov (Roger L. Jackson), Dunwall's genius inventor; the Outsider (Robin Lord Taylor), the representational figure of the Void, an alternate dimension that grants supernatural abilities; and Jessamine Kaldwin (April Stewart), Emily Kaldwin's mother, whose spirit was trapped in The Heart.

=== Plot ===
Fifteen years after Corvo Attano restored Emily Kaldwin to the throne following the assassination of her mother, Dunwall has prospered under her reign. A serial killer known as "the Crown Killer" has been murdering Emily's enemies, leading many to believe that Emily and Corvo are responsible. During a ceremony in remembrance of Jessamine Kaldwin's assassination, Duke Luca Abele of Serkonos arrives with the witch Delilah Copperspoon. Delilah claims to be Jessamine's half-sister and the true heir to the throne. The Duke's men attack, killing Emily's men. The player then chooses whether to continue as Emily or Corvo, and the character not chosen is magically turned to stone by Delilah. The player escapes to the Dunwall docks, where Meagan Foster is waiting. Meagan was sent by Anton Sokolov to warn Emily and Corvo about the Duke's coup. They sail for Karnaca, where Delilah began her rise to power. During the voyage, the player is visited by the Outsider, who offers them supernatural powers and instructs them to stop Delilah.

Arriving in Karnaca, the player is tasked with rescuing Sokolov, who was kidnapped by the Crown Killer. Infiltrating Addermire Institute, where the Crown Killer is reportedly hiding out, the player discovers that the Crown Killer is the alter ego of Karnaca's Chief Alchemist, Alexandria Hypatia (Jessica Straus). Hypatia accidentally created the Crown Killer persona when she tested an experimental serum on herself, and the Duke then exploited this to frame Emily. The player either kills Hypatia or cures her condition.

Investigating Addermire, it is revealed that Sokolov was imprisoned by Kirin Jindosh (John Gegenhuber), the Duke's Grand Inventor. The player enters Jindosh's Clockwork Mansion, kills him or performs an electrical lobotomy on him, and frees Sokolov. Sokolov directs the player to eliminate Breanna Ashworth (Melendy Britt), the curator of the Royal Conservatory and witch working for Delilah. The player enters the Royal Conservatory and discovers that Ashworth brought Delilah back from the Void, after her defeat at the hands of Daud, the assassin who killed Emily's mother. Ashworth is either killed or has her powers removed.

With Delilah being too powerful to defeat conventionally, Sokolov suggests the player investigate the home of mining magnate Aramis Stilton (Richard Cansino). Upon entering Stilton's mansion, the player discovers that he had gone insane after witnessing Delilah's resurrection. With the aid of the Outsider, the player travels back in time and observes the Crown Killer, Jindosh, Ashworth, and the Duke pull Delilah from the Void. Afterward, Delilah siphons part of her soul into a statue, making her immortal.

The player invades the Duke's palace to eliminate him and retrieve Delilah's soul. After either killing the Duke or working with his body double to depose him, the player finds the statue and extracts Delilah's soul. The player then returns to Dunwall for a final confrontation with Delilah. After reuniting Delilah with her soul, the player may choose to kill Delilah or trick her into trapping herself inside her own painting.

==== Endings ====
There are multiple endings based on whether the player caused high chaos by indiscriminate murder, or achieved low chaos by refraining from taking lives. These endings are also dependent on whom the player killed or spared, and which factions, if any, they sided with.

In the High Chaos ending, the player is faced with the choice of freeing Emily / Corvo from petrification or leaving them that way. If Emily is not left in stone, she becomes a vengeful empress and brutally purges Delilah's supporters. If Corvo leaves Emily petrified, he takes the throne for himself and becomes a brutal tyrant known as Emperor Corvo "the Black". Karnaca is either ruled by a new tyrant or collapses into anarchy and, if alive, Sokolov becomes a broken man after witnessing the perversion of his work, and is exiled to his home country.

In the Low Chaos ending, the player frees Emily / Corvo from their imprisonment. A council of representatives, or, optionally, Corvo, who can make himself the new Duke, takes charge in Karnaca and brings the city back from the brink. Emily becomes a fair and just ruler, reuniting the Empire. Sokolov, proud to see his work used for good, returns to his home country to spend his last days in comfort.

In either ending, if Meagan survives, she is revealed to be Billie Lurk and leaves to search for Daud, leading to Dishonored: Death of the Outsider.

== Development ==
Dishonored 2 was developed by Arkane Studios and published by Bethesda Softworks. After having co-directed the first game, Harvey Smith worked as director of Dishonored 2. Though the first Dishonored was developed by both Arkane teams in Lyon, France and Austin, United States, its sequel was developed largely solely in Lyon as Arkane Studios Austin were focused on developing 2017's Prey. Both studios collaborated on the game, and playtested each other's builds. The game runs on Arkane's "Void" engine, as opposed to Unreal Engine 3 that was previously used in Dishonored. The Void engine is based on id Tech 5, though the majority of the original engine was rewritten. Arkane removed unneeded elements from the engine like the mini open world and overhauled the graphics. The new engine is intended to improve in-game lighting and post-processing to help the game's visuals, and allows the game to visualize subsurface scattering.

Dishonored was not developed with a sequel in mind, but ideas for one began to emerge during the development of its downloadable content. Harvey Smith described the decision to make Emily playable as "intuitive", with Emily having been a child in the original game. The impact that Emily had on players in Dishonored, which changed how the game was being played, made the developers decide to continue her story and give her more depth in Dishonored 2. Although this meant moving the timeline along, Arkane did not want to go too far for fear of losing the series' gaslamp fantasy / steampunk aesthetics. The choice to include Corvo as an alternate player character was itself a later decision.

In contrast to the first game, it was decided that both Emily Kaldwin and Corvo Attano should be voiced in Dishonored 2. The developers had previously experimented with a voiced player character with the assassin Daud in two pieces of Dishonored's downloadable content, The Knife of Dunwall and The Brigmore Witches. Voiced player characters allowed the developers to draw attention to things on-screen via dialogue, and Arkane found them better at making players more emotionally invested. As Corvo had been a silent character in the first game, Arkane wanted to avoid going against any broad assumptions a player may have made about his character while also giving him a more assertive personality, which Smith remarked as an increased challenge for the writers. Originally, the player was to have access to all the powers regardless of what character was chosen. However, instead the team chose to limit them, and have the character's powers "reflect their lives or their time in the world".

Arkane was influenced by some criticisms of the first Dishonored. Although the difficulty was not considered a major problem, a sizeable number of players had complained the first was too easy, and thus the harder difficulty settings were reworked. The chaos system of Dishonored, considered as merely a binary ersatz meter, was intended to have more depth in the sequel. The altered chaos system, where different individuals grant varying amounts of chaos, was implemented due to how many players used the Heart in the original game. As the Heart would reveal secrets about whomever it was pointed at, players would use it to decide which non-player characters to kill and which to leave be or spare. Also intended to yield additional improvements was the upgrade system, which would for the first time level up based on a skill tree. Bone charms were made into craftable items, with 400,000 possible combinations available. While taking into account the intricacies of how supernatural abilities would be used, designers faced increased difficulty in relation to the play-style where the game is traversed in their absence, noting the accommodation of the play-style in a way that would not cancel out the other as a challenge.

As Arkane's Austin studio had left to work on Prey, Arkane Studios Lyon had to rebuild the AI team and begin work on the AI "from scratch". In addition to their own individual AIs, the guards in the game respond to a master AI that assigns them roles and helps them react to and work with each other.

With Dishonored 2, developers wanted to make the game's characters more representative. Arkane tried to give more key roles to non-white characters both to match the "melting pot" nature of the Empire and create a realistic world, and to ensure any potential player could find themselves reflected in the world. Elsewhere, characters exist who are not heterosexual, though developers wished this to feel a natural part of the world rather than "draw[ing] a big sign" around them. Emily's sexuality itself is deliberately never specified in order to allow for players to impose their own interpretations. The first Dishonored had received some criticisms about giving women limited types of roles. From Dishonored's downloadable content onwards, Arkane attempted to address these concerns and reach a more "plausible balance" in the world. This trend continued for Dishonored 2 which has women in a wider range of roles, including as guards.

=== Art, level design, and setting ===
Dishonored 2 takes place in the southern Europe-inspired Karnaca. Its buildings are often flat-roofed, and the game features a vertical element less emphasized in the original Dishonored.

Sébastien Mitton, who acted as art director on the first game, returned to the position for Dishonored 2. Viktor Antonov, who helped conceive of Dishonored's "painterly" look, had moved on as a general creative consultant for Bethesda and thus was less involved in the art of Dishonored 2. Arkane drew on paintings and sculptures for the art design, and had Lucie Minne mold several clay busts. The game begins and ends in the city of Dunwall, the setting of the first game, with most of the game taking place in Karnaca, "the jewel of the south". The change in setting in part was out of a desire to show another corner of the series' Empire. On using both settings, Harvey Smith commented that Arkane felt "we need to start it at home ... and then venture out into an exotic place and come back". Mitton wanted Dishonored 2 to be a visual "journey to a new city", though keeping the same sensibility of the first game and elements like oppression, disease, magic, and decay.

The history of Karnaca reportedly took approximately a year to create. After the creation of the setting's basic outline, the team focused on developing ideas that were inspired from inside the game, rather than from the outside world. Arkane had anthropology and politics in mind when creating the land's history, looking upon the first settlers of the region, the influence of foreign powers taking up residence there, and the different "tides of culture" that shaped the city. An attempt was made to have the game feature various different types of architecture, to reflect these various waves of settlers. The Arkane team worked with industrial designers and architects in creating Karnaca.

Based on the Cypriot city of Larnaca (hence its name) with inspiration from other southern Europe countries like Greece, Italy and Spain, Karnaca is warmer and sunnier than Dunwall. Reference photos were used from a variety of places to help design the city, including Cuba, Lyon and Malibu, California. The buildings in Karnaca frequently have flat roofs and more ornate windows. Photography from the 1920s was examined in order to help build a setting with a historical disposition, using reference websites like Shorpy.com and looking at the work of Agustín Casasola. Whereas Dishonored was largely built on the real world of 1837, Dishonored 2 draws ideas from "the architectural forms, popular fashions, and far-out technologies" of 1851. Arkane tried to take architectural concerns into account, and considered the effect the wind would have on the way the city developed, with energy being generated by wind turbines. Level designers and level architects collaborated throughout the entire production as locations were built. In making Karnaca, a style of Art Nouveau was applied.

The developers intended to depict Karnaca as a grounded environment to help the city seem as though it could exist in reality. Arkane wished to avoid what one member dubbed "the Deus Ex effect"—wherein man-sized vents were placed wherever the game designers felt, often in nonsensical places. The team tried to reflect practicalities of everyday life; for instance, a building would have to have some kind of toilet, and a guard's placement should make in-world sense. Colonies in places such as Australia, India and Africa were investigated to comprehend the transition of people adapting from the cold climate of Dunwall to areas with a warmer constitution like Karnaca.

Designing the in-game propaganda, they studied its use in history, finding the same pattern of elements reappearing throughout the centuries. In place of the militarily inspired propaganda of the first game, Dishonored 2 would employ a subtler approach; lavish posters for invariably canceled enterprises meant to aid the people of Serkonos were made to exhibit the nature of tyranny as practiced by the Duke of Serkonos and his government. To further detail the world, the narration team would come up with fictitious products and brand names and make advertisements of them.

== Release ==
The game was formally announced during Bethesda's Electronic Entertainment Expo 2015 press conference by Dishonored co-directors Raphaël Colantonio and Harvey Smith, but was leaked the night before during a rehearsal. Lucie Minne's clay models, along with other Dishonored art, were featured on display at Art Ludique in an exhibit focused on French video games. Dishonored 2 appeared again at E3 2016. An image for the game by Sergei Kolesov was featured as part of the "Into the Pixel" collection. It was released to manufacturing on 1 November and made available on 11 November. The PC version was tamper-protected by anti-piracy software Denuvo, which was cracked in June 2017 by hacker group SteamPunks.

Preordering Dishonored 2 granted players access to the full game a day early. Bethesda announced a special collector's edition of the game as a pre-order on their online store. The collector's edition included a 13.5 inch replica of Corvo Attano's signature mask, a zinc alloy replica of Emily Kaldwin's ring, a Delilah Kaldwin propaganda poster and a metal collector's edition case for the game disc and manual. Digital bonuses were also included in the form of the Digital Imperial Assassin's Pack, which included additional in-game content. Pre-orders for console versions of the collector's edition came with a copy of Dishonored: Definitive Edition, a remastered version of the first game for the eighth generation of consoles with all downloadable content included.

In May 2016, Bethesda announced a Dishonored tie-in comic miniseries and novel trilogy. The comic mini-series, published by Titan Comics and written by Gordon Rennie with art by Andrea Olimpieri and Marcelo Maiolo, consists of four issues, the first of which was published in August. The three tie-in novels are published by Titan Books, the first of which, The Corroded Man, written by Adam Christopher, was published in September, with the second and third volumes following in 2017. In addition, a Dark Horse Comics-created artbook, The Art of Dishonored 2, was released, launching on the same date as the game. An art contest was held over social media—from 28 June to 17 July—with five winning participants being featured in the book. A graphic novel, The Peeress and the Price, was released on 20 February 2018. Written by Michael Moreci, drawn by Andrea Olimpieri and colorized by Mattia Iacono, it was created as a follow-up to the game.

Dishonored 2 received later updates. A New Game Plus mode was made available on 19 December 2016, which also allows the player access to both protagonists' powers in a single playthrough. Customizable difficulty settings along with a mission-select option were postponed to 23 January 2017 for all platforms. A standalone expansion, Dishonored: Death of the Outsider, was released on 15 September 2017. It follows Billie Lurk and Daud the assassin as they embark on a mission to kill the Outsider.

== Reception ==
=== Pre-release ===
Emily Kaldwin's reveal as player character at E3 2015 drew attention pre-release. GamesRadar called it one of the event's biggest surprises, noting the rarity of female protagonists. Both GameSpot and The Guardian commented on the prominence of female player characters in 2015's E3 expo. Game Informer called her one of ten "most promising" new characters revealed at the expo. The game's appearance at E3 2016 gained accolades. IGN awarded it "Best Xbox One Game", and it was nominated "Game of the Show", "Best PlayStation 4 Game", "Best Action Game", "Best Trailer", and "Best PC Game", being the runner-up to the last of which.

Dishonored 2 was nominated for "Best of Show", "Best Console Game", "Best PC Game" and "Best Action/Adventure Game" at the Game Critics Awards. Game Informer awarded the game "Best Multiplatform Game". PC Gamer gave the game "Best of Show". Eurogamer selected the game as one of the five best games at E3, highlighting the time-manipulating level and commenting "it's hard to imagine there'll be any game as intricate released this year, nor one quite so imaginative".

=== Post-release ===
Reception

Aggregate score
Aggregator	Score
Metacritic	PC: 86/100; PS4: 88/100; XONE: 88/100

Review scores
Publication	Score
Destructoid	7.5/10
Electronic Gaming Monthly	7/10
Game Informer	9.25/10
GameRevolution	4.5/5
GameSpot	8/10
GamesRadar+	4.5/5
IGN	9.3/10
PC Gamer (US)	93/100
Polygon	8.5/10
VideoGamer.com	10/10

Dishonored 2 received generally favorable reviews according to Metacritic. The levels "Clockwork Mansion" and "A Crack in the Slab" were singled out to considerable praise. The game has been the recipient of over one hundred Best of 2016 awards. On its release, PC players reported issues with performance such as loss of frame rate and display resolution, and system crashes. Three patches for the PC version were released to remedy the problem.

Chris Carter of Destructoid considered the stealth approach "glorious"; the heart item one of his favorite ways to be exposed to further content; the puzzles and traversal challenges demanding; and the task of becoming a better assassin rewarding. The only complaints concerned shortcomings in frame rate capabilities on the Xbox One console, "stilted voice acting and script issues, despite the compelling narrative". Electronic Gaming Monthly's Nick Plessas wrote that Dishonored 2 "[recreates] many of the positive experiences from the previous instalment, but [requires] much greater effort on the part of the player this time around to achieve it". According to Plessas, the game's emotional substance was derived from the player character as coupled with the choices and their consequences to the story, though he was moved significantly more by the "smaller moments" of the game than the finale.

Writing for Game Informer, Matt Bertz thought the balance between low-chaos and high-chaos play styles held an improved competence from the original game and that each approach availed thought-provoking scenarios to be solved. Each character's abilities were praised as "equally useful". Bertz disparaged the main story beats however, calling them "rushed and underdeveloped", whilst lauding the environmental storytelling. James Kozanitis at Game Revolution enjoyed playing as Emily Kaldwin the most and said that, because some elements from Dishonored had returned, Emily infused a fresh perspective into the overall experience. Kozanitis favored the stealthier approach, which was said to better accommodate side quests—opined as the chief incentive for playing Dishonored 2. GameSpot's Scott Butterworth was satisfied with the use of weapons and observed that the sophisticated behavior patterns of the artificial intelligence (AI) rendered into "fun" experimentation, especially for stealth employment. The lack of increasing challenges was subject to criticism, with Butterworth lamenting the "underutilized" new enemies; the plot met charges of reproval for the same reason. Conversely, one quest involving time manipulation was declared a "masterpiece unto itself" and another in a clockwork-driven mansion was labeled as "mind-bending".

Lucas Sullivan of GamesRadar complimented its sense of place, supernatural abilities and execution, but disapproved of the character development and constraint of a number of mechanics that were otherwise "brilliant". GamesRadar remarked in the days following that the Clockwork Mansion mission exemplified the best of Arkane Studios' "rich, intricate level design". IGN's Lucy O'Brien felt the decision to allocate powers and story details between the two player characters was "smart", echoing the view that the characters' abilities were "excellently" adaptable to both play styles. She commended the level design for distinguishing each level in terms of providing unique gameplay mechanics and expressed admiration for the game world's "gorgeous, painterly aesthetic". Phil Savage, writing for PC Gamer, stated that "at its worst, it offers a similar experience to its predecessor, which is to say, it offers tens of hours of extraordinary first-person stealth and action". PC Gamer later recognized the Clockwork Mansion as one of the best levels of 2016. Polygon's Arthur Gies noted the combat system as "improved and refined", the setting as "Dishonored 2's greatest inherited strength" and the AI units for their "excellent peripheral vision", yet regarded the inability to replay missions and the absence of a New Game Plus option as "possible deal-breakers". Alice Bell at VideoGamer.com wrote in her verdict: "Dishonored 2 takes everything you loved about Dishonored and improves upon it without becoming bloated. It's a beautifully designed, layered game, stuffed with hidden gems and secret stories. Also you can stab people in mid air".

=== Sales ===
Dishonored 2 was the fourth best-selling game in its first week of release, but the launch week sales dropped thirty-eight percent when compared with the original game, although only sales of physical copies were recorded. That same week, the game had sold the most pre-orders on Steam and was ranked sixth in overall sales. It was the seventh best-selling retail video game in the UK in its second week of release, according to Chart-Track, a fifty-two percent decrease from the first week – similar to that of its predecessor. After a reduction in cost, Dishonored 2 re-entered the UK charts in the fourth week of May 2017, ranked in 8th place with a 1,267 percent rise in sales.

=== Accolades ===
Year	Award	Category	Result	Ref.
2016	The Game Awards 2016	Best Action/Adventure Game	Won	
2016	PC Gamer's Best of 2016	Game of the Year	Won	
2017	Polygon's Best of 2016	Game of the Year	7th Place	
2017	Visual Effects Society Awards	Outstanding Visual Effects in a Real-Time Project (Crack in the Slab)	Nominated	
2017	Visual Effects Society Awards	Outstanding Created Environment in an Episode, Commercial, or Real-Time Project (Clockwork Mansion)	Nominated	
2017	17th Game Developers Choice Awards	Best Design	Nominated	
2017	17th Game Developers Choice Awards	Game of the Year	Nominated	
2017	National Academy of Video Game Trade Reviewers	Animation, Artistic	Nominated	
2017	National Academy of Video Game Trade Reviewers	Animation, Technical	Nominated	
2017	National Academy of Video Game Trade Reviewers	Art Direction, Period Influence	Nominated	
2017	National Academy of Video Game Trade Reviewers	Camera Direction in a Game Engine	Nominated	
2017	National Academy of Video Game Trade Reviewers	Character Design	Nominated	
2017	National Academy of Video Game Trade Reviewers	Control Design, 3D	Nominated	
2017	National Academy of Video Game Trade Reviewers	Control Precision	Nominated	
2017	National Academy of Video Game Trade Reviewers	Costume Design	Won	
2017	National Academy of Video Game Trade Reviewers	Direction in a Game Cinema	Nominated	
2017	National Academy of Video Game Trade Reviewers	Game Design, Franchise	Nominated	
2017	National Academy of Video Game Trade Reviewers	Game Engineering	Nominated	
2017	National Academy of Video Game Trade Reviewers	Lighting/Texturing	Nominated	
2017	National Academy of Video Game Trade Reviewers	Original Dramatic Score, Franchise	Nominated	
2017	National Academy of Video Game Trade Reviewers	Song, Original Or Adapted	Nominated	
2017	National Academy of Video Game Trade Reviewers	Song Collection	Nominated	
2017	National Academy of Video Game Trade Reviewers	Sound Editing in a Game Cinema	Nominated	
2017	National Academy of Video Game Trade Reviewers	Sound Effects	Nominated	
2017	National Academy of Video Game Trade Reviewers	Use of Sound, Franchise	Nominated	
2017	National Academy of Video Game Trade Reviewers	Game, Franchise Action	Nominated	
2017	British Academy Games Awards	Artistic Achievement	Nominated	
2017	British Academy Games Awards	Game Design	Nominated	
2017	British Academy Games Awards	Narrative	Nominated	
2017	Golden Joystick Awards	Best Visual Design	Nominated	
2017	Golden Joystick Awards	Ultimate Game of the Year	Nominated	

== See also ==
- Immersive sim
