= Dishonored =

2012 video game

- Developer: Arkane Studios
- Publisher: Bethesda Softworks
- Directors: Raphaël Colantonio; Harvey Smith
- Designer: Viktor Antonov
- Programmers: Hugues Tardif; Stevan Hird
- Artist: Sébastien Mitton
- Writers: Harvey Smith; Austin Grossman; Terri Brosius
- Composer: Daniel Licht
- Series: Dishonored
- Engine: Unreal Engine 3
- Platforms: PlayStation 3; Windows; Xbox 360; PlayStation 4; Xbox One
- Release: 9 October 2012: PS3, Windows, Xbox 360; FRA: 9 October 2012; NA: 9 October 2012; AU: 11 October 2012; EU: 12 October 2012 PlayStation 4, Xbox One; NA: 25 August 2015; AU: 27 August 2015; EU: 28 August 2015
- Genres: Action-adventure, stealth
- Mode: Single-player

Dishonored is a 2012 action-adventure game developed by Arkane Studios and published by Bethesda Softworks. Set in the fictional, plague-ridden industrial city of Dunwall, Dishonored follows the story of Corvo Attano, bodyguard to the Empress of the Isles. He is framed for her murder and forced to become an assassin, seeking revenge on those who conspired against him. Corvo is aided in his quest by the Loyalists—a resistance group fighting to reclaim Dunwall, and the Outsider—a powerful being who imbues Corvo with magical abilities. Several actors, including Susan Sarandon, Brad Dourif, Carrie Fisher, Michael Madsen, John Slattery, Lena Headey, and Chloë Grace Moretz, provided voice work for the game.

The game is played from a first-person perspective and allows the player to undertake a series of missions in a variety of ways, with an emphasis on player choice. Missions can be completed through stealth, combat, or a combination of both. Exploring each level opens new paths and alternatives for accomplishing mission goals, and it is possible to complete all missions, eliminating all of Corvo's targets, in a non-lethal manner. The story and missions are changed in response to the player's violent actions or lack thereof. Magical abilities and equipment are designed to be combined to create new and varied effects.

During its two and a half years in production, several versions of Dishonored were developed. Before the creation of Dunwall—inspired by late nineteenth-century London and Edinburgh—the game was set to take place in medieval Japan and seventeenth-century London. During development, test players discovered methods of exploiting the available powers and abilities to achieve unexpected outcomes; instead of restricting these techniques, the designers attempted to redesign levels to accommodate them. Dishonored's music score was produced by composer Daniel Licht to represent London in the nineteenth century.

Dishonored received positive reviews, focusing on the missions' individual narratives, the freedom available in completing them, and the game's art direction. The game won several awards, including the 2012 Spike Video Game award for Best Action-Adventure Game and the 2013 BAFTA award for Best Game, and was repeatedly recognized as the best action-adventure game of 2012 and one of that year's best games. It has also been cited as one of the greatest video games ever made. Dishonored was initially released in October 2012, for PlayStation 3, Windows, and Xbox 360, and was later supplemented with additional content focusing on the assassin Daud and his quest for redemption. PlayStation 4 and Xbox One versions of the game were released in August 2015. Two narrative sequels, Dishonored 2 and Dishonored: Death of the Outsider, were released in 2016 and 2017 respectively, and the 2021 game, Deathloop, takes place within the far future of the Dishonored universe.

== Gameplay ==
Dishonored is an action-adventure game played from a first-person perspective with an emphasis on stealth action and the use of gadgets and the environment to eliminate opposing forces. The game world is a series of self-contained, mission-focused areas designed for multiple avenues of exploration in terms of in-game movement and powers. Between missions, the player is taken to a central hub called the Hound Pits pub where the player character Corvo can meet with his allies, receive mission briefings and alternate objectives, and convert recovered loot into new equipment and upgrades. In-game areas include loading docks, royal estates, poverty-stricken streets, and a bathhouse. The player can save their progress at any time (except for during combat), and the game includes a checkpoint save system. The game has four difficulty levels which modify the effectiveness of health and mana (magic) potions, and enemies' awareness, damage delivered, and responsiveness. In the easy setting, health regeneration is possible.

Dishonored features role-playing elements, such as the ability to upgrade powers and to make moral choices with a focus on non-linear consequences. The game is designed to allow the player to complete it without killing any non-player characters (NPC), including boss characters and mission targets. An example of a non-lethal situation given by co-creative designer Harvey Smith involved the player completing a side mission for a character, and in return that character had two of Corvo's targets kidnapped and enslaved. Each mission contains multiple ways to explore and reach targets. Movement through and exploration of levels is designed to support the player character's abilities, rather than specific paths that are aimed at a particular gameplay style, such as hacking or sneaking. Specific elements of missions, such as changes to the color of a target's clothing and mask in one mission are randomized, requiring the player to explore the game area to find the target each time the mission is played.

The player's actions are not judged to be good or evil, but instead are tracked by a "chaos" system that records the amounts of friendly fire, violence, and deaths the player causes. This modifies the game world, affecting the story without directly punishing the player or forcing them to choose one style of play over another. For example, an NPC who disapproves of violence may refuse to support the player, or may even betray them. The game reacts to the chaos caused in scripted ways, such as changing dialogue, and dynamic ways, such as increasing the presence of rats and plagued citizens and adding new scenes. This can affect the active mission and future missions. The system also influences which of the game's two endings is reached, with variations based on which characters live or die. Using violence allows missions to be completed in less time than using a stealth approach, but violence consumes more in-game resources such as health and mana potions, which are required more often in direct combat.

=== Abilities and powers ===
Gameplay emphasizes combining different abilities to overcome obstacles. Here, the player summons rats, slows time in order to attach a weapon to a rat, possesses that specific rat, and walks it to the enemy, killing them. The player then teleports to subdue a difficult-to-reach enemy. (0:34)

Dishonored features six active powers, four passive powers or enhancements, and 40 bone charms which grant the player supernatural perks, such as the ability to increase the duration of rat possession. Initially, only three bone charms can be active at any time; up to six can be active through optional upgrades. Smith and designer Raphaël Colantonio stated that it is impossible for a player to accrue all of the powers and abilities in a single playthrough. The player requires mana to use these abilities; mana partially regenerates after use to allow "Blink" and "Dark Vision" powers to be used, but mana potions are required to regenerate more mana, restricting the use of higher cost abilities like "Possession" and "Bend Time." Magic and ranged weapons are assigned to the player character's left hand control and a sword is assigned to the right hand control.

The main supernatural powers are unlocked and purchased using runes—artifacts carved from whale bone—and each can be upgraded. Powers include "Dark Vision", which allows the player to see enemies through walls, their field of view and highlights interactive objects; "Blink", a short-distance teleportation ability; "Possession", that allows the player to temporarily inhabit and possess other characters; "Devouring Swarm", which summons a swarm of deadly rats; "Bend Time", that slows or freezes time; "Wind Blast", a gust of wind that can knock down enemies; and "Shadow Kill" that turns dead enemies to ash, preventing their discovery by opposing forces. The player can use weapons including a sword, grenades, a crossbow, and pistols. Coins must be collected to upgrade weapons and gadgets.

Stealth is based on limiting the player character's visibility; hiding behind objects and buildings, avoiding the enemies' cone of vision, and avoiding lighted areas aid in reducing detection. When hiding behind an object, the player can lean around the sides to see the immediate area and eavesdrop, and as long as Corvo remains hidden, his enemies will not see him. The player can also look through keyholes to gain insight into closed rooms. Sneaking up behind enemies allows the player to silently subdue them, and unconscious or dead bodies can be moved and hidden.

Guards have several states of alertness, ranging from normal to suspicious; they can become aware of the player's presence or can actively search for them. Enemy artificial intelligence (AI) will respond to sound and can be distracted using sound to lure guards away from their positions. If the player remains concealed from guards, their alertness will drop to "aware", but it will not return to normal in that mission. Enemies communicate their states of alertness to their allies, increasing the alertness level throughout the mission.

== Synopsis ==
=== Setting ===
Dishonored takes place in the industrial city of Dunwall, where technology and otherworldly forces coexist. The city's design is modeled on London and Edinburgh between the late 1800s and the early 1900s. The capital of the Empire of the Isles, Dunwall is ruled by an oppressive regime that came to power following the assassination of the Empress and the kidnapping of her daughter. The city is a center for fishing and whaling; whale oil is a valuable resource which is needed to power the city. After a natural philosopher discovered that whale oil can be used as a fuel, the government used it to develop powerful weaponry, which in turn bred government corruption. The city is stricken with a plague spread by rats, which is killing the poor and isolating the rich. The infected, known as "weepers", cry blood and can become violent. The government uses the plague as an excuse to take or purge citizens as they wish. Order is maintained by the Tallboys, heavily armored officers on tall, mechanical legs, and districts are separated by barriers known as "Walls of Light", which are made of energy and disintegrate unauthorized people who try to cross them. A covert group of activists, the Loyalists, plots to overthrow the government and install the Empress's daughter as the new Empress.

=== Characters ===
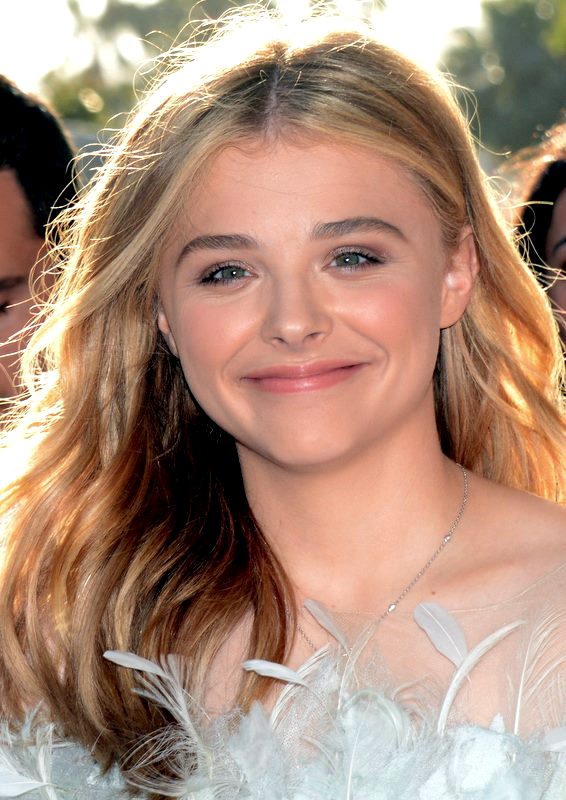
Actress Chloë Grace Moretz voiced the young princess Emily Kaldwin, her second video game voice acting role.

The main character of Dishonored, whom the player controls, is Corvo Attano, the former bodyguard to Dunwall's Empress Jessamine Kaldwin (April Stewart). Corvo becomes an infamous assassin after he is framed for the empress's murder. He is skilled in stealth and combat, is armed with unusual gadgets, and possesses great supernatural powers. The game designers chose Corvo to remain silent so that players could project themselves onto the character. Corvo is aided by the Loyalists, led by Admiral Farley Havelock (John Slattery), and members: Piero Joplin (Brad Dourif)—an inventor who builds Corvo's mask and supplies him with gadgets; Treavor Pendleton (Derek Phillips)—a member of parliament; Samuel (Ryan Cutrona)—a commoner who ferries Corvo to and from his missions; Overseer Teague Martin (Joel Johnstone); and Callista Curnow (Lena Headey)—the caretaker for the Empress's daughter Young Lady Emily (Chloë Grace Moretz). Other characters include Granny Rags (Susan Sarandon)—a former aristocrat now blind and deranged after years of living on the streets; Daud (Michael Madsen)—leader of a group of assassins known as "the Whalers"; and Slackjaw (Al Rodrigo)—a gang leader. Carrie Fisher and Gregg Berger provide the voices of the loudspeakers found throughout the city relaying government propaganda.

The Outsider (Billy Lush) offers to help Corvo in his quest. Described as a mixture of God and the Devil, The Outsider imprints his mark on Corvo, imbuing him with magical abilities, and provides him with a mechanically altered human heart (April Stewart) that tells Corvo secrets. The Outsider also grants his mark, and special abilities, to other characters. Smith described the character as an amoral figure who grants abilities, but leaves the choice of how to use them up to the recipient.

Corvo's targets include the Lord Regent Hiram Burrows (Kristoffer Tabori)—the Empress's former spymaster who masterminded her death and framed Corvo, and now controls Dunwall; Burrows's lover Lady Boyle (Anna Graves)—an aristocrat funding the military; Lords Custis and Morgan Pendleton (Zach Hanks)—twins and members of Parliament; High Overseer Thaddeus Campbell (Daniel Hagen)—leader of the city's religious order; and Anton Sokolov (Roger Jackson)—a genius inventor responsible for the creation of many advanced technologies including the Wall of Light.

=== Plot ===
After returning from a foreign voyage to seek aid with the deadly plague ravaging the city, Corvo Attano travels to the tower of Dunwall and meets with the Empress. After delivering a message, they are attacked by teleporting assassins led by Daud; they magically restrain Corvo, kill the Empress, and kidnap her daughter Emily. The Empress's Spymaster arrives and has Corvo imprisoned for her murder and Emily's abduction. Six months later, the Spymaster has seized control of Dunwall as Lord Regent. Interrogating Corvo, the Lord Regent confesses that he masterminded the assassination and framed Corvo. The following day, Corvo is due to be executed. A letter from Empire Loyalists is smuggled to Corvo and he is given the means to escape. Samuel ferries Corvo to the Hound Pits Pub to meet the Loyalists, led by Admiral Havelock.

While resting, Corvo is taken to a dream world where he meets the Outsider, who brands Corvo with his mark. Corvo is sent by the Loyalists to eliminate the conspirators behind the Lord Regent's plot, and the player is given the option to kill or otherwise neutralize the targets, the first of which is High Overseer Campbell. Corvo removes the High Overseer and discovers that Emily is being held in a brothel called the Golden Cat under the supervision of twins Custis and Morgan Pendleton. Corvo rescues Emily and eliminates the brothers. After returning to the pub, Emily is taken into the care of Callista to prepare her for becoming Empress, while Corvo is sent to abduct the genius scientist Sokolov, who is responsible for the Lord Regent's powerful technologies. Sokolov is taken to the pub for interrogation, under which he divulges the identity of the Lord Regent's financier, Lady Boyle. Corvo infiltrates Boyle's masquerade ball and disposes of her.

After returning to the pub, Havelock confirms they have done enough damage to move against the Lord Regent. Corvo infiltrates the tower of Dunwall and removes the Lord Regent from power. He learns that the Lord Regent intentionally imported the plague to decimate the lower classes of society, but it escalated out of his control. Corvo returns to the Hound Pits Pub, where the Loyalists celebrate their success. After sharing a drink, Corvo goes to his room and collapses. Upon waking, he learns that Samuel poisoned his drink at the behest of Havelock and his Loyalist allies Treavor Pendleton and Teague Martin, to prevent him from interfering in their plan to install Emily as Empress and rule through her. However, Samuel remained loyal to Corvo and, without the knowledge of the Loyalist conspirators, had given him a non-lethal dose of poison. Samuel sets Corvo adrift on the river and flees. When Corvo wakes, he is taken prisoner by Daud and his men, who intend to claim the bounty placed on Corvo's head by taking him back to the now Lord Regent Havelock.

Nonetheless, Corvo overcomes his new captors and defeats Daud and his assassins before going into the sewers. Corvo returns to the pub to find it overrun with guards and that Havelock has killed many of the Loyalists. He discovers where Havelock has taken Emily and can save Piero, Sokolov, and Callista. Corvo signals to Samuel, who ferries him to the former Lord Regent's lighthouse. He infiltrates the lighthouse and either subdues Pendleton and Martin or finds that Havelock has already killed them, ensuring the Loyalists' actions remain secret. Once finished with Havelock, Corvo may or may not rescue Emily. Havelock's journal reveals that he suspected that Emily is Corvo's daughter.

The ending varies depending upon the level of chaos the player has caused throughout the game. If Corvo saves Emily, she ascends the throne as Empress with Corvo at her side, and, if minimal chaos has been caused, a golden age dawns and the plague is overcome. After many decades, Corvo dies of natural causes, and Empress Emily Kaldwin I the Wise buries him beside Empress Jessamine. If much chaos is caused, the city remains in turmoil and is overrun with the plague. If Corvo fails to save Emily, Dunwall crumbles, and Corvo flees the city by ship.

== Development ==
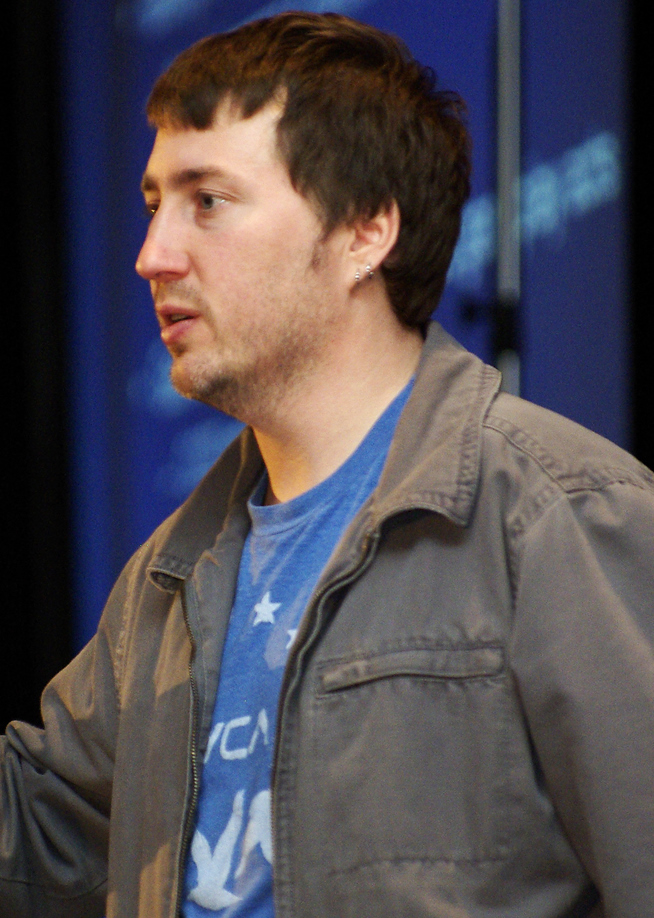
Deus Ex designer Harvey Smith (pictured in 2007) served as one of Dishonored's two creative directors.

Bethesda Softworks first announced Dishonored as a first-person, stealth, action-adventure game for Microsoft Windows, PlayStation 3, and Xbox 360 platforms on 7 July 2011. Dishonored is the first Arkane Studios game Bethesda published after its parent company ZeniMax Media bought Arkane in August 2010. Arkane Studios founder Raphaël Colantonio and Deus Ex developer Harvey Smith were the game's creative directors, and Deus Ex designer Ricardo Bare was its lead technical designer. Visual design director Viktor Antonov, who designed Half-Life 2's City 17, and art director Sebastien Mitton led the art team. Smith, Colantonio, Antonov, and Mitton spent three years in pre-production. Bethesda approached Arkane and asked them to develop a new game and a new intellectual property. The team already had ideas for developing a similar game, but until Bethesda approached them, Arkane had no specific ideas. Mitton contacted Antonov in May 2009 to ask for his help to establish an artistic identity for a new intellectual property. The full Arkane team—including their offices in Lyon, France, and Austin, Texas—worked on the game.

The game supports a different interface for Microsoft Windows users to that for the console versions, and also supports the use of Xbox 360 controllers on Windows PCs. Smith described the team's philosophy of allowing its developers who are passionate about a particular release platform to develop software for it; those passionate about PC will work on developing that interface, while Xbox 360 aficionados were allowed to develop the Achievements for that platform. Dishonored was officially released to manufacturing on 28 September 2012.

=== Gameplay ===
The development team researched unexpected ways the player could combine Corvo's special powers, such as combining a high jump with the ability to teleport in order to travel greater distances than either ability allowed independently. Instead of restricting these exploits, the team tried to design levels to accommodate them. The designers did not consider all of the powers they conceived during development, such as a power to become a shadow that could move along walls, to be suitable for the game. Some existing powers went through several revisions: a version of "Bend Time" caused the player to unfreeze enemies when touched; "Possession" allowed the player to control a victim remotely without inhabiting their body, but this offered less challenge. Balancing the effectiveness of the player's powers was considered difficult. Colantonio said: "We wanted to give [the player] very strong powers, to make [the player] really a badass, but at the same time we didn't want the game to be too easy". Each power has a duration, mana cost, and other variable properties that allowed the team to effectively scale even the most destructive of abilities by making them costly to use frequently or limiting the time they remain active.

Dishonored's stealth system was originally based on that of the Thief series, which uses level lighting and shadows to determine whether an enemy can detect the player character's presence. However, it was decided that it was unrealistic that an enemy could stand directly in front of a player hiding in shadows and not detect them. It was also considered that making certain areas dark hid the designers' work and contrasted poorly with well-lit areas. Much of the ambient dialogue was written to be lengthy and add background detail to the game world and to entertain stealth players who may be in a single area for a long time. Conversely, main story dialogue was written to be short to compensate for the player being able to interrupt or kill the character who is speaking.

To design the missions, the designers began with a cohesive area, which they filled with activities for the player. They defined paths to the target areas, and developed and expanded them. They then populated the areas with NPCs, which they assigned to patrol routes and functions. The designers would then observe how players interacted with the level, using their abilities and powers to test whether the area provided a suitable challenge for the available powers, and then redesigned the level as needed. At first, the levels featured little directional information to emphasize the player's ability to traverse them as they choose, but in testing, players became lost or obeyed NPC commands to not enter an area, leaving them unable to proceed. In response, the developers introduced more visual cues and verbal hints to direct players. Some features and ideas were removed during the design process, including a mental institution where Corvo would have faced sound-sensitive patients. Discussing the use of violence and the consequences of in-game freedom, developer Joe Houston recounted his experience while watching a tester play a mission to infiltrate a masquerade ball; Houston determined that not killing the NPCs opened up more objectives and interactions, but the tester systematically killed every NPC in the level, which Houston found disconcerting. The team came under pressure to excise a scene from the end of the game where Samuel, in response to a player killing indiscriminately throughout the game, can betray Corvo by alerting enemies to his presence. Smith explained: "Everybody just wants to be told in a video game that you're great, no matter what you do. If you slaughter everybody – you killed the maids, you killed the old people, you killed the beggars – you're great, here's a medal, you're a hero... We decided that sounds psychotic. It doesn't match our values... What we wanted was to let you express yourself in the game, but to have the world react to that, at least in some way. [Samuel], betraying you and firing off that flare, was something we had to fight for".

=== Design ===
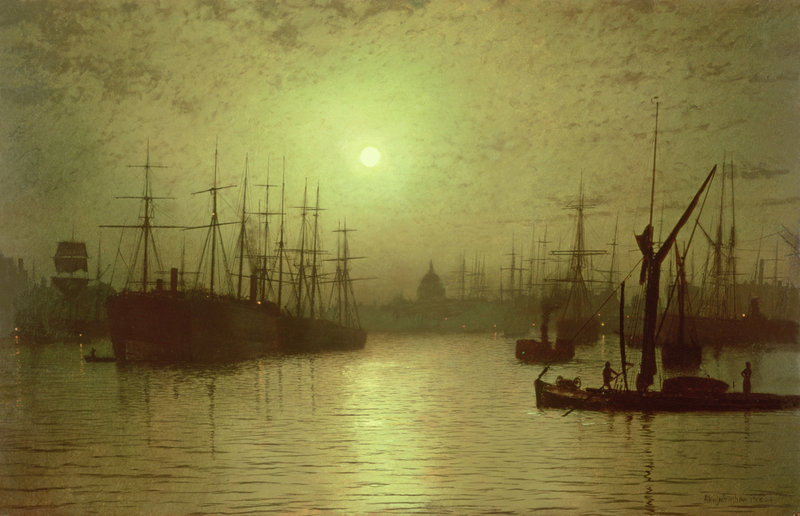
Dishonored's mood was partly inspired by the works of nineteenth-century artist John Atkinson Grimshaw, depicting London at night.

Dishonored was originally set in medieval Japan, but the idea was dropped early in the game's development because of the difficulties presented in marketing the setting, and because no member of the design team knew much about the culture. Arkane moved the setting to London in 1666, considering that the city was recognizable to Europeans and Americans. Later designs inspired by added gameplay mechanics such as floodlights, electrified barriers and 20th-century technologies that it no longer resembled London, and Arkane opted to develop a fictional city. The city of Dunwall, designed to be a "contemporary and cool" "period piece", was inspired by late-19th and early-20th-century London and Edinburgh. Describing why London had been an initial setting and remained a significant inspiration, Smith said:

Because it was the last year of the plague, and the year of the great fire of London, which of course ended the plague by burning the slums down ... In this kind of game you're always looking for a way to up the tension and frankly make the world a little more perilous, and justify why there aren't giant crowds of people at the market. Then people had the idea for swarms of rats, and we were talking independently about possession, and we wondered if you should be able to possess rats and if they could clean up corpses so you don't have to hide them. All these pieces just worked together.

Antonov described his inspiration from London as "a big metropolis, it's messy, it's chaotic and intense ... and it's both exotic and familiar to Americans and to Europeans". He highlighted the importance of that familiarity to different cultures because "you want to communicate to a lot of people when you make a new piece of fiction". He said that Edinburgh provided a sense of containment and a variety of architectural designs, which were combined with a futuristic vision which Antonov said was not comparable to the brass, rivets, and steam of steampunk design. Antonov and Mitton traveled to London and Edinburgh for research, taking photographs of people, places, and objects. The pair avoided the busier streets and focused on side streets and alleyways that would better suit the game's world. Mitton stated: "We were trying to design the game from a rat's viewpoint ... if we have a small city, from a constrained viewpoint, what are all the different angles that we can explore?" Inspiration also came from the artwork of John Atkinson Grimshaw, Canaletto, and Gustave Doré. The world map was designed as a single piece of art and was sectioned so the designers were clear on where each mission takes place.

In-game characters were inspired by illustrations from adventure and pirate stories such as Captain Blood (1922), the work of Charles Dana Gibson, and mugshots from Edwardian London and Australia. An anatomy expert helped ensure the morphology of character faces represented Great Britain, while Arkane maintained a sense of realism and political incorrectness. Mitton established defining groups for characters such as rich, poor, and hostile with specific anatomy and posture designs, and animators created stylized movements for each social class and specific characters to help convey emotions. The city guards, for example, have small heads, low shoulders, and big hands, with animations that blend human and monkey movements. Antonov and Mitton employed a textile carpet designer in Russia to design and paint some of the in-game art.

The designers conceived the Tallboys as town criers. Stilts were later added after Mitton noticed someone cleaning their office façade while wearing stilts; the town crier role was replaced with loudspeakers throughout Dunwall. The Tallboy design evolved into a lamplighter that would light street lamps with whale oil tanks, but after further development, the designers considered that their tall, mechanical legs allowed them to burn the dead and deal with plague-infected citizens while remaining above them and avoiding infection, leading to their final design as a guard armed with a bow. Mitton suggested adding a phosphorus canister to the Tallboys' backs for aesthetic reasons, but Smith suggested whale oil, which in turn led Mitton to design the whaling ships to give the whales a visible presence in the city. For other technologies, designers conceptualized using 18th-century technology to build modern items and vehicles, and creating 18th-century items using modern tools.

The Heart is a human heart modified with technology and the supernatural, that helps the player to find collectible items in the levels, and "plays a part related to informing [the player's] decisions about when to apply violence or not, making it a really interesting, more subtle part of the power fantasy". The Heart provides contextual verbal feedback to the player, offering insight into a particular location, the secrets or history of a character, and its own origins. The Heart was originally designed as a method of identifying assassination targets using vibration and sound mechanics. The design then developed into the concept of the Heart speaking and feeling alive and having its own agenda. As a result of player-conducted testing of the game, the designers decided that a more direct navigation system was required. The Heart's gameplay role continued to change, and it continued to provide narration on its perceptions of different characters, which helped to reinforce the narrative themes and to differentiate the city's social classes in a more subtle alternative to having the characters provide expository dialogue. Colantonio and Smith were concerned that optional use of the Heart would result in some players missing the information it provides, but they considered that it was a part of giving the player the freedom to choose how to play.

The Hound Pits pub, which acts as a base for the player, was initially a larger structure. Filling out the interior of the pub required too many stairs and rooms, and the large amount of climbing made navigation confusing. The team found retaining the large exterior they wanted while creating and disguising a smaller interior that was easier to traverse challenging. The pub's exterior was shrunk to resemble an Edwardian building, but the interior remained labyrinthine so Colantonio required that a chain be placed outside Corvo's bedroom, allowing him to reach the roof quickly. In frustration, the designers decided to simply close off the third floor entirely. The art team continued to receive requests throughout development, requiring them to extend pre-production until the end of the development cycle. Each design was hand drawn.

=== Music ===
Daniel Licht composed the game's score—an ambient, violin-heavy presentation designed to represent 19th-century London. Licht's score is designed to make the player feel unsettled, and not provide comfort. He described the music as an "evil fog" that fades in and out of the game without being initiated by any scripted moments or to warn of impending danger, instead creating the impression of ever-present danger. As Dishonored features few cinematic scenes that allowed for long interactions with any particular character, Licht found himself limited in developing specific character themes, and instead focused largely on composing ambient music. Samples of Licht's ambient themes were used in the game's few cinematic scenes, although Licht was not involved in scoring them. Licht conceived the score as a mixture of older music befitting the period setting, and 20th-century techniques such as reversed sounds. Dishonored's credit song, "Honor for All", was written by Licht and his nephew Jon, who also provided the track's vocals. It was written as a reward for players who had finished the game.

== Release ==
Dishonored was released on PlayStation 3, Windows, and Xbox 360 platforms in North America and France on 9 October 2012, on 11 October in Australia, and on 12 October in the rest of Europe. Celebrating the North American launch, Smith, Colantonio, and other Arkane Studios staff members from the company's office in Austin, Texas, signed copies of the game at a local GameStop store. A Game of the Year edition, containing all released downloadable content (DLC), was released in October 2013. The Definitive Edition, a remastered version of the game featuring improved graphics, and all released DLC was released on the PlayStation 4 and Xbox One in August 2015.

=== Marketing ===
External media

Audio
- The Drunken Whaler at Bethesda

Video
- 2012 E3 gameplay trailer at YouTube
- Tales of Dunwall episode 1 at YouTube
- Tales of Dunwall episode 2 at YouTube
- Tales of Dunwall episode 3 at YouTube

Bethesda Softworks developed a spin-off iOS game, Dishonored: Rat Assassin, released free of charge on 30 August 2012. The game requires players to use a knife and crossbow to kill rats while avoiding bombs. Rat Assassin was well received for the variety and quantity of content provided, but received some criticism for dark visuals, that made it difficult to see the rats. The game drew frequent comparisons to another mobile game, Fruit Ninja.

As part of the game's promotion, Bethesda employed COPILOT Music and Sound to develop the ominous "The Drunken Whaler", a modified version of the sea shanty "Drunken Sailor". Copilot decided to use ordinary children to sing the lyrics instead of a professional youth choir, aiming to achieve a dark, haunting quality to the music. However, they found it difficult to recruit children from local schools to sing about slit throats and hungry rats, and instead used child actors, adult singers who could imitate children, and the children of their friends. Instruments included violins, detuned and distorted guitars, and a "whaler stomp" created by the team, who stamped on wooden boards to create a pulsating sound. "The Drunken Whaler" appeared in the game's trailer and attracted a positive reception during its presentation at the 2012 Electronic Entertainment Expo (E3). Following its debut, the trailer was watched over 850,000 times on YouTube, and it was awarded the Machinima Best Trailer award.

A set of three animated videos, titled Tales from Dunwall, serving as a prequel to Dishonored, were released in September 2012. The videos show the discovery of whale-oil fuel, the Outsider granting his mark to a small boy in search of revenge, and Piero creating Corvo's mask. All three videos were created by animation studio Psyop and marketing firm Rokkan, narrated by Chloë Grace Moretz, and scored by Daniel Licht. Each Tales from Dunwall episode received a gold Clio Award for achievement in advertising. In the same month, the game was used as inspiration for prosthetic makeup effects on the television reality show Face Off.

== Reception ==
=== Pre-release ===
Dishonored was displayed for the public at the 2012 Electronic Entertainment Expo (E3), and received four nominations from the Game Critics Awards for Best Action/Adventure Game, Best Console Game, Best Original Game, and the overall Best of Show award. The game was also recognized at the event for: "Game of Show" by GameSpy, and Joystiq Editor-in-Chief Ludwig Keitzmann, and was nominated by Destructoid and EGM; "Best Action Game" by GameSpy, and EGM, and nominated by Destructoid; "Best of E3 2012 Editors' Choice Award" by GameSpot; and "Most Original Game" by G4TV. Other recognition included: "Best of Show" by Digital Trends; "Best of E3 Selection" by Yahoo Games and Game Revolution; "The Best Game at E3" by CinemaBlend; and "Top 10 Game of E3" by Paste magazine and Stuff; Kotaku listed the "Blink" ability as one of the "Top 27 Game Ideas" at the event. Jurors from the Entertainment Software Association and the Academy of Interactive Arts & Sciences selected "Regent", a piece of artwork for the game by artist Sergey Kolesov, to be one of 16 works for the 2012 Into the Pixel art exhibition. At the 2012 Gamescom trade fair in August 2012, the game won the award for "Best of Gamescom" and "Best Console Game" for both the PlayStation 3 and Xbox 360 platforms. For the same event, Eurogamer named Dishonored as its "Game of the Show." Attendees of the 2012 Eurogamer Expo named it the number-one game of the show.

=== Critical reception ===
Reception

Aggregate score
| Aggregator | Score |
|---|---|
| Metacritic | PC: 91/100; PS3: 89/100; X360: 88/100; PS4: 80/100; XONE: 76/100 |

Review scores
| Publication | Score |
|---|---|
| 1Up.com | A+ |
| Computer and Video Games | 9.5/10 |
| Eurogamer | 8/10 |
| G4 | 4.5/5 |
| Game Informer | 8.75/10 |
| GameSpot | 9/10 |
| Giant Bomb | 4/5 |
| IGN | 9.2/10 |
| The Escapist | 5/5 |
| News.com.au | 5/5 |
| The Daily Telegraph | 5/5 |
| The Verge | 9/10 |

Dishonored received positive reviews from critics. Aggregating review website Metacritic provides a score of 91 out of 100 from 29 critics for the Microsoft Windows version, 89 out of 100 from 35 critics for the PlayStation 3 version, and 88 out of 100 from 56 critics for the Xbox 360 version. Reviewers likened Dishonored to well-received games from the early 2000s such as Deus Ex and the Thief video game series. The Telegraph's Tom Hoggins said it is like the "thinking man's games [from] the turn of the century which cherished player choice and control", comparing it against contemporary "noisy, brash thrill-rides obsessed with military ooh-rah and barely interactive set pieces". Dale called Dishonored "one of the greatest games of this generation", and wrote that it excelled by drawing inspiration from older games and allowing players to figure out solutions without advice. Dale also called it the first true stealth game for a long time, and the closest comparison to Thief in the current generation of games. Schreier stated that the game blends "the do-what-you-want structure of Deus Ex with the masterful world design of BioShock".

Dishonored's plot received a polarized response, with many reviewers praising the standalone stories driving each mission, but criticizing the game's overarching narrative. IGN's Cam Shea said it is "a shame that Dishonored's story isn't greater than the sum of its decidedly memorable parts", but added, "Dishonored is a game you'll talk with your friends about". Eurogamer's Dan Whitehead, The Verge's Arthur Gies, and Giant Bomb's Patrick Klepek criticized the end of the game for its generic missions, "late narrative missteps", and abrupt ending. Klepek also criticized the repetitive ambient dialogue in the missions. Whitehead also stated that the unique, inventive, and distinctive missions allowed for memorable gameplay that subverted the overarching story. Joystiq's Alexander Sliwinski was disappointed by the abrupt ending, and that the story did not explore much of the developed world of Dunwall, but said that the overall experience left him wanting more. In contrast, The Escapist's Susan Arendt wrote that the story was well paced, and Shacknews's John Keefer stated that it was emotionally immersing and is "role-playing at its story-driven finest", but added that some plot points were not properly explained or developed.

The gameplay was generally praised for giving players freedom to use differing methods to complete objectives and to explore the levels. Keefer wrote that in-game mechanics like the powers and equipment are not essential and did not detract from the story, but served as optional bonuses in levels that can be completed with creativity and cleverness. He also said that some missions offered too much freedom without guidance, leaving the player lost on how to proceed. According to Gies, the game can initially seem unstructured from a level-design perspective, but after exploring them it becomes clear about how much thought went into different actions a player can take, allowing them to experiment instead of focusing on rigid objective-driven design. GameSpot's Chris Watters enjoyed the various pathways and methods of traversing each level with "compelling abilities", particularly the "Blink" power, and the freedom of choice which he said made Dishonored "one of the truly remarkable games of" 2012. Arendt said that the game's flexibility was also a shortcoming, with certain playing styles favoring certain abilities that when fully upgraded, preclude the desire to explore levels for further enhancements and resources. Game Informer's Joe Juba also wrote that the game punishes players for taking certain paths, particularly one of violence, which results in more difficult gameplay and a perceived less satisfying ending, encouraging stealth over alternatives. Kotaku's Jason Schreier contrasted Dishonored with other contemporary video games, and said that where other games may require a player to find a specific solution to defeat an enemy or solve a puzzle, Dishonored "feels like entering a designer's playpen", providing the player with an array of tools and then allowing them to experiment with how they interact with, or break, the world.

Reviewers also said that the game's variety encourages replaying. Computer and Video Games' Alex Dale praised the variety and replayability of the game, and said, "Dishonored doesn't demand you see everything it has to offer, although it is compulsive enough to ensure you will". News.com.au's William Colvin wrote that the game's only shortcoming could be that it offered too many options, and Watters stated the game achieves a rare feat of being "compulsively replayable". Problems in the player's control of Corvo were raised; Whitehead noted the controls were unresponsive when used in contextual situations. Sliwinski said that the controls worked well.

Reviewers criticized the AI, which some found inconsistent. Whitehead criticized his experience of enemies that can see Corvo from a great distance yet sometimes remain unaware of him while in his enemies' peripheral vision. Juba criticized the inconsistent detection by enemies that lead to unpredictable and unreliable stealth mechanics that could force stealth-focused players into a combat situation, for which their character is not built. According to G4's Jake Gaskill, the AI worked well in combat, with enemies employing different tactics and effectively countering attacks, but when not alerted, enemies would ignore actions directly in front of them. Watters also mentioned lulls in enemy intelligence, but he said that it remained tenacious enough to keep the enemies formidable.

The game's visuals and design were generally praised; Gaskill said that the art style is unique and the game world is both vivid and fully realized, and Gies stated that the game has a "unifying vision and design that stands apart from its contemporaries as something different". Colvin described Dishonored as "a triumph for the medium ... that sets the benchmark for visuals, story, and character performance", and that it is "easily the best looking game you'll play this year". Juba found the "steampunk-inspired" technology designs fascinating, and stated that the visual style and art direction offer a distinct aesthetic that accompanies the "dark and disturbing" lore found in the city.

=== Sales ===
In the week before its release (30 September – 6 October), the game was the third best-selling game on Steam, based on pre-orders. During the first week of sales in the United Kingdom, Dishonored became the second best-selling game on all available formats behind FIFA 13 (in its third week), the number-one selling PC game, and the biggest launch of an original game in 2012, exceeding Sleeping Dogs. It was the UK's 24th best-selling game and the second best-selling original game of 2012. Based on physical copies sold, it was the ninth best-selling original game of the 2010s.

In North America, Dishonored was the fourth best-selling game of October 2012, selling 460,200 physical units, exceeded only by Pokémon Black Version 2, Resident Evil 6, and NBA 2K13. During the 2012 Thanksgiving holiday weekend (23 – 25 November), it was the number-one game on Steam.

=== Accolades ===
Dishonored was named Best Action Adventure Game at the 2012 Spike Video Game Awards and was nominated for Best Graphics, Best PS3 Game, Best Studio (Arkane Studios), Best Xbox 360 Game, and Game of the Year. It won the Inside Gaming Award for Best Environmental Design. During the 16th Annual D.I.C.E. Awards, the Academy of Interactive Arts & Sciences nominated Dishonored for "Adventure Game of the Year" and outstanding achievements in "Art Direction", "Game Direction", "Gameplay Engineering", and "Story". The Visual Effects Society nominated Viktor Antonov, Sebastien Mitton, Jean-Luc Monnet, and Julien Roby for Outstanding Real-Time Visuals in a Video Game. Dishonored also won the Audience Choice award at the 2013 Game Developers Choice Awards, and received four nominations for Best Game Design, Best Narrative, Best Visual Arts, and Game of the Year.

Dishonored won Best Overall Action Game and Best PC Action Game in IGN's Best of 2012 awards, and was nominated for Best Overall Game and Best Action Game on both PlayStation 3 and Xbox 360 platforms. Game Informer named it the Best Action game and one of the 50 best games of 2012. Additionally, PlayStation Official Magazine named it their Game of the Year, Official Xbox Magazine named it the Best Original Game, 1UP.com named it one of their favorite games of 2012, Jeux Video listed as the number 2 PC game of 2012, and ActionTrip named it Best Action Game. The game was named the Best Action/Adventure Game as part of the 2012 Yahoo! Games Game of the Year awards, and GameSpot's Best of 2012 series listed Dishonored as the Best Action/Adventure Game, Best PS3 Game, and Best Xbox 360 Game. The 2013 British Academy of Film and Television awards saw the game win the Best Game award and receive nominations for Game Design and Story. At the 2013 Golden Joystick Awards, Dishonored received six nominations for Game of the Year, Best Newcomer, Best Storytelling, Studio of the Year (Arkane Studios), Best Visual Design, and Best Gaming Moment for "Lady Boyle's Last Party". Edge also named Arkane Studios as the Studio of the Year. In 2014, IGN listed it as the sixty-seventh best game of the contemporary console generation, and it was 32nd on PC Gamer's list of the Top 100 PC Games.

Dishonored appeared on several lists of the best games of 2012, and was placed at number one by Ars Technica, CBS News, CNET, CNN, Edge, the Daily Mirror, Forbes, and The Guardian (jointly with XCOM: Enemy Unknown); number three by GameFront, Metro, and Paste magazine; number five by USA Today; number six by GameSpy, and Joystiq; and number ten by Slant Magazine. Gamasutra also listed it as one of the ten best games of 2012, while Eurogamer readers voted it as the top game of 2012. In 2013, GamingBolt ranked Dishonored as the 95th Greatest Video Game Ever Made, and in 2015, Rock, Paper, Shotgun listed it as the 23rd best PC First-Person Shooter ever made, while PC Gamer named it the 6th greatest PC Game. In 2019, IGN listed it as the 97th-best video game of all time. Eurogamer and Rock, Paper, Shotgun named it as one of the best games of the decade.

List of awards and nominations
| Year | Award | Category | Recipient | Result | Ref. |
|---|---|---|---|---|---|
| 2012 | Spike Video Game Awards | Best Action Adventure Game | Dishonored | Won | |
| 2012 | Spike Video Game Awards | Best Graphics | Dishonored | Nominated | |
| 2012 | Spike Video Game Awards | Best PS3 Game | Dishonored | Nominated | |
| 2012 | Spike Video Game Awards | Studio of the Year | Arkane Studios | Nominated | |
| 2012 | Spike Video Game Awards | Best Xbox 360 Game | Dishonored | Nominated | |
| 2012 | Spike Video Game Awards | Game of the Year | Dishonored | Nominated | |
| 2013 | British Academy of Film and Television | Best Game | Dishonored | Won | |
| 2013 | British Academy of Film and Television | Game Design | Dishonored | Nominated | |
| 2013 | British Academy of Film and Television | Story | Dishonored | Nominated | |
| 2013 | 16th Annual D.I.C.E. Awards | Adventure Game of the Year | Dishonored | Nominated | |
| 2013 | 16th Annual D.I.C.E. Awards | Outstanding Achievement in Art Direction | Dishonored | Nominated | |
| 2013 | 16th Annual D.I.C.E. Awards | Outstanding Achievement in Game Direction | Dishonored | Nominated | |
| 2013 | 16th Annual D.I.C.E. Awards | Outstanding Achievement in Gameplay Engineering | Dishonored | Nominated | |
| 2013 | 16th Annual D.I.C.E. Awards | Outstanding Achievement in Story | Dishonored | Nominated | |
| 2013 | Game Developers Choice Awards | Best Game Design | Dishonored | Nominated | |
| 2013 | Game Developers Choice Awards | Best Narrative | Dishonored | Nominated | |
| 2013 | Game Developers Choice Awards | Best Visual Arts | Dishonored | Nominated | |
| 2013 | Game Developers Choice Awards | Game of the Year | Dishonored | Nominated | |
| 2013 | Visual Effects Society | Outstanding Real-Time Visuals in a Video Game | Viktor Antonov, Sebastien Mitton, Jean-Luc Monnet, Julien Roby | Nominated | |
| 2013 | Golden Joystick Awards | Game of the Year | Dishonored | Nominated | |
| 2013 | Golden Joystick Awards | Best Newcomer | Dishonored | Nominated | |
| 2013 | Golden Joystick Awards | Best Storytelling | Dishonored | Nominated | |
| 2013 | Golden Joystick Awards | Studio of the Year | Arkane Studios | Nominated | |
| 2013 | Golden Joystick Awards | Best Visual Design | Dishonored | Nominated | |
| 2013 | Golden Joystick Awards | Best Gaming Moment | Lady Boyle's Last Party | Nominated | |

== Downloadable content ==
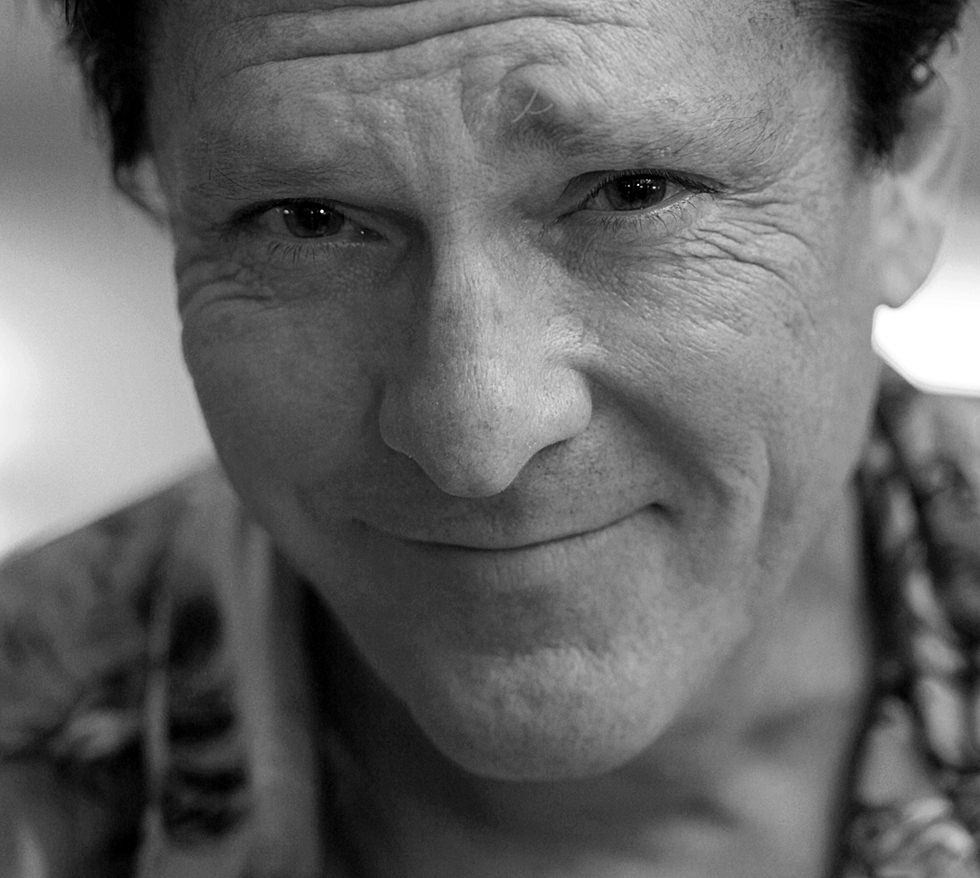
Michael Madsen in 2011. He reprised his role as the assassin Daud in Dishonored's story-based downloadable content.

A variety of pre-order incentives were announced for the game, including a Dishonored-themed, 72-card deck of Tarot cards, a USB whale-oil lamp, and a smartphone decal. DLC incentives offered in-game packs for the player character, including the "Arcane Assassin", "Shadow Rat", "Backstreet Butcher", and "Acrobatic Killer" packs that offer enhancements for the player character's abilities, money, and a statue of one of the game's creatures that increases bone charm carrying capacity.

"Dunwall City Trials", the game's first post-release DLC, was released on 11 December 2012, and contains 10 challenge maps. The player must defeat waves of enemies, complete time-trial challenges, and perform a series of drop assassinations in which the player kills a target by dropping from a location above the target.

Two story-based campaign DLC packs were announced in October 2012 for release in 2013, and follow the assassin Daud as he seeks redemption for murdering Empress Jessamine in Dishonored's main story. The first expansion, The Knife of Dunwall was released on 16 April, on PlayStation 3, Xbox 360 and Microsoft Windows. It features Daud (again voiced by Michael Madsen) as a playable character, with his own abilities including: "Void Gaze", which combines the functions of Corvo's "Dark Vision" with those of The Heart, guiding Daud to runes and bone charms; his own version of "Blink", which allows him to pause time; and an ability which allows Daud to summon his assassin followers. Additionally, Daud also has his own gadgets, such as stun mines, a concealed wrist-mounted bow, "Chokedust" grenade, which dazes enemies; and arc mines that disintegrate enemies. The Knife of Dunwall's plot runs parallel to that of Dishonored's, providing Daud's perspective on events, and introduces new locations, such as a whale slaughterhouse and Dunwall's affluent legal district. The Knife of Dunwall also features an additional difficulty level, "Master Assassin", which is made available after completing the content. Dishonored designer Ricardo Bare served as the content's creative director. The second and final expansion is titled The Brigmore Witches and was released on 13 August. The Brigmore Witches follows Daud's quest to stop the eponymous witches from enacting a powerful ritual that will doom Emily Kaldwin, and concludes with Daud's ultimate fate at the hands of Corvo in the core game. The ending, like the main game, is determined by the player's actions and choices, called "chaos level". The DLC carries over player choices and upgrades from a The Knife of Dunwall saved game.

=== Plot ===
==== The Knife of Dunwall ====
Months after killing the Empress in front of her daughter, Daud remains wracked with guilt. The Outsider summons Daud, offering him the chance to change his future, telling him only the name "Delilah". Alongside his lieutenant Billie Lurk, Daud learns of Delilah Copperspoon, the Empress' childhood friend, an artist, and leader of the Brigmore Witches. Before he can investigate further, Daud learns that the High Overseer's forces have invaded the Flooded District to eliminate Daud and his assassins. Daud fends them off before being confronted by Billie. In the high chaos ending, Billie attacks Daud hoping to usurp his position, seeing him as weak and unstable since killing the Empress; Daud is forced to kill her. In the low chaos ending, Billie admits that she intended to replace Daud and was working with Delilah who led the Overseers to Daud's location. However, Billie has realized that Daud is still a worthy leader and surrenders to him, allowing Daud to spare or execute her. Delilah appears and warns Daud that if he continues to pursue her, she and the Brigmore Witches will destroy him.

==== The Brigmore Witches ====
Daud sails out of Dunwall to infiltrate Delilah's hideout at Brigmore Manor, intending to prevent her completing an arcane ritual. While investigating the manor, Daud learns that the ritual will allow Delilah to use a magical painting to possess Emily's body and, in turn, become the new Empress of Dunwall. The Outsider meets with Daud and admits he led him to Delilah in the hopes that Daud would stop her plot, as the Outsider must remain neutral and cannot directly interfere. Daud enters the Void to put a stop to Delilah, either by killing her or sabotaging her ritual to trap her in the Void. Upon returning to Dunwall, Daud is confronted by Corvo as in the main game: a high chaos rating results in Corvo executing Daud, while low chaos results in him sparing Daud.

=== Critical reception ===
According to Metacritic, The Knife of Dunwall received "generally favorable reviews". It was generally praised for its level design, which encouraged exploration to find hidden content and alternative routes through areas. The modifications to certain abilities, particularly Blink, were similarly well received for the changes they brought to the gameplay from the main game. The story, however, was generally criticized. Polygon noted that the deadly assassin Daud had no motive for seeking redemption, and allowing him to be played as a non-lethal character created a disconnect with the narrative. IGN considered that it felt like only half of a complete game, lacking any urgency in its story and featuring a disappointing conclusion.

The Brigmore Witches received a similarly positive response "generally favorable reviews" according to Metacritic. The gameplay was generally considered an improvement, providing more intricate level design and nuanced world building that produced gameplay requiring a more thoughtful approach. PC Gamer appreciated that the levels each had a distinct theme, and adequately provided for both stealth and violent gameplay, while Polygon said that only the last level improved over the preceding DLC, introducing new mechanics that forced changes in stealth players. The story of The Brigmore Witches, in contrast, received a mixed response, with Destructoid saying that it offered a more gripping narrative, while Polygon stated that it lacked the same tension as The Knife of Dunwall, and the ending felt rushed and unsatisfying.

== Sequels and adaptations ==
Bethesda indicated that sales of Dishonored were exceeding their expectations and that as a result, they intended to develop Dishonored into a franchise. Dishonored 2 was released on 11 November 2016. The sequel's story is set 15 years after the events of Dishonored. Emily is deposed as Empress during a coup by the witch Delilah and the Duke of Serkonos, a foreign land. Playing as either Corvo or Emily, the player must neutralize members of the coup and retake Dunwall. A standalone sequel, Dishonored: Death of the Outsider, was released on 15 September 2017. Taking place after Dishonored 2, it follows Daud's former second-in-command, Billie Lurk, on her quest to defeat the Outsider. The 2021 first-person shooter, Deathloop, is set in the far future of Dishonored's narrative universe.

A Dishonored tabletop role-playing game was released on 29 September 2020. Developed by Modiphius Entertainment and adapted by Nathan Dowdell, the game features input from Harvey Smith and writers from the Dishonored video games. The Dishonored Roleplaying Game includes a 300-page corebook and allows players to take on the roles of criminals, assassins, explorers, and loyalists in various story campaigns.
