= Robin Lord Taylor =

American actor and director

- Taylor in 2026
- Born: June 4, 1978 (age 48); Shueyville, Iowa, U.S.
- Occupations: Actor, director
- Years active: 2005–present
- Spouse: Richard DiBella (m. 2011)

Robin Lord Taylor (born June 4, 1978) is an American actor and director. He is known for playing Oswald Cobblepot in the Fox series Gotham (2014–2019) and Will Bettelheim in the Netflix series You (2019). He also voices The Outsider in the video games Dishonored 2 (2016) and Dishonored: Death of the Outsider (2017). His film roles include the comedy Accepted (2006), the sci-fi drama Another Earth (2011), the horror Would You Rather (2012), and the thriller John Wick: Chapter 3 – Parabellum (2019).

== Early life ==
Taylor was born in Shueyville, Iowa, to Robert Harmon Taylor and Mary Susan (née Stamy) Taylor. He attended Solon High School and Northwestern University, earning his Bachelor of Science degree in theatre in 2000. While at Northwestern, his roommate was actor Billy Eichner.

== Career ==
Taylor has appeared in several television series, such as The Walking Dead, Law & Order, Law & Order: Special Victims Unit, The Good Wife and Person of Interest. He had a recurring role as "Darrell, the Late Show page with the fake British accent" on Late Show with David Letterman.

Taylor was featured in Spike Lee's segment "Jesus Children of America" of the 2005 anthology film on the theme of childhood and exploitation All the Invisible Children (Venice Film Festival), The House is Burning (produced by Wim Wenders (Cannes Film Festival), Pitch (Cannes Film Festival), Kevin Connolly's Gardener of Eden (Tribeca Film Festival) and Assassination of a High School President (Sundance Film Festival).

Taylor co-created and co-starred in Creation Nation: A Live Talk Show with Billy Eichner, which they performed at the 2008 Edinburgh Festival Fringe, as well as at the HBO Aspen Comedy Festival and throughout New York City and Los Angeles. He has also appeared onstage in Neighborhood 3: Requisition of Doom, The Shooting Stage, Henry IV and No. 11 Blue and White, as well as numerous productions in Stephen Sondheim's Young Playwrights Festival at the Cherry Lane Theater.

Taylor played Abernathy Darwin Dunlap in Accepted. He appeared in such independent films as Would You Rather, Cold Comes the Night, and Another Earth, the last of which won the Alfred P. Sloan Prize at the 2011 Sundance Film Festival.

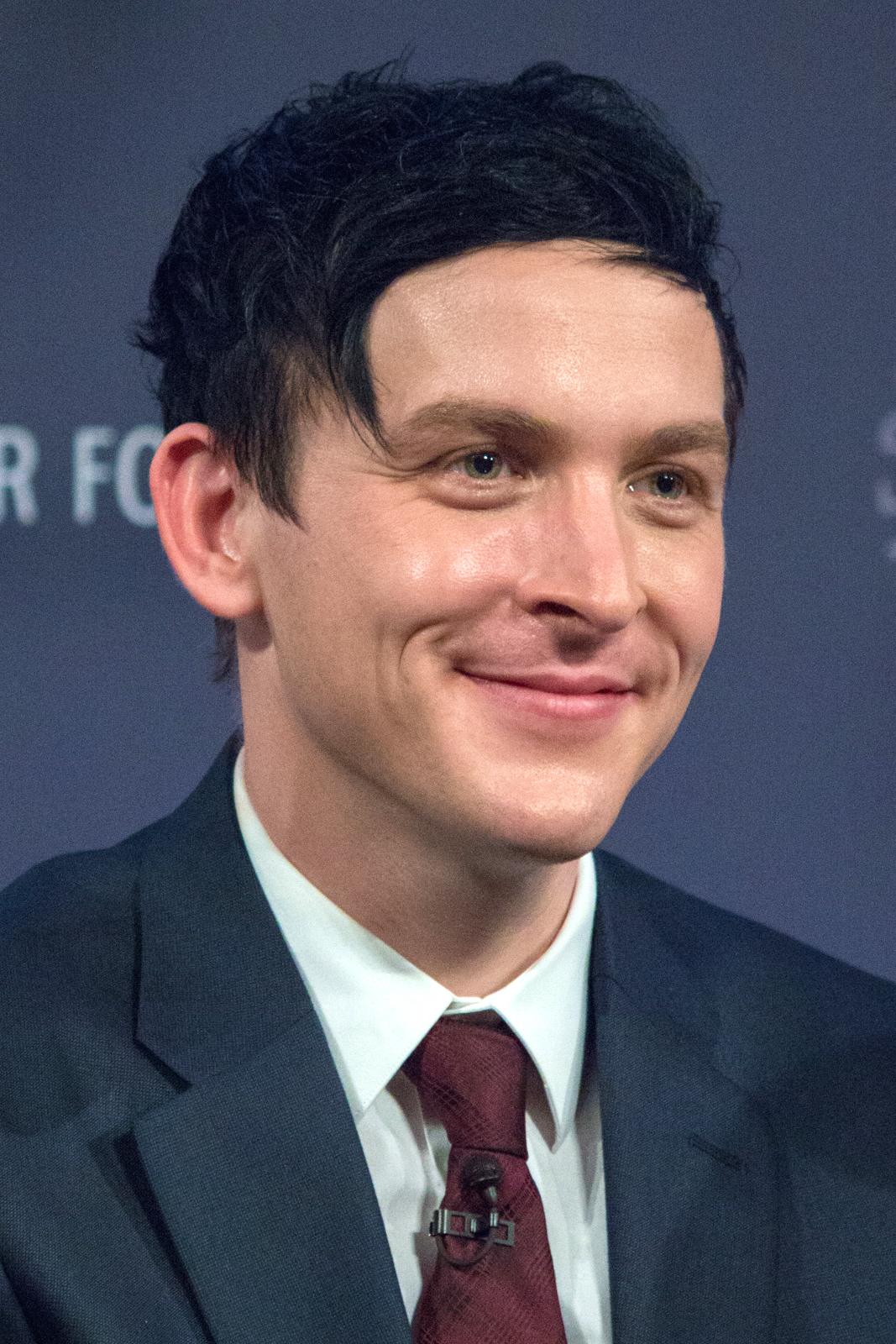
Taylor at PaleyFest in 2014

Taylor was cast as Oswald Cobblepot in February 2014. His performance as Cobblepot has been described by Esquire as a "standout performance of the first episode [...], disarming and multilayered", by The Wall Street Journal as "a passionate performance ... [that] steals the show", and as "spectacularly cast as the Penguin".

In February 2019, it was announced that Taylor had been cast in the recurring role of Will Bettelheim on the second season of the Netflix thriller series You.

From 2021 to 2022, Taylor also appeared in Kevin Can F**k Himself in the recurring role of Nick, a restaurant worker, across both seasons of the show.

== Personal life ==
As of 2000, Taylor lived in Manhattan.

In a November 2014 Glamour interview, Taylor was asked, "I notice you are wearing a wedding ring on your ring finger. Are you married?" To which he responded, "I am married! I like to keep it private, but I've been married for over three years, and we've been together for 10½ years. No kids. No kids yet!"

In March 2015, Slate noted Taylor in an article discussing "Several actors who are openly gay or who have been cast in multiple straight or bisexual roles and the typecasting of gay roles". Taylor, himself, added: "I feel like the landscape has totally changed. Regardless of sexual preference, it's more that as a character actor, the less I reveal about myself, the better. My favorite actors are the ones I know least about." In April 2015, Taylor openly identified as gay on episode 672 of The Nerdist Podcast with Chris Hardwick. In honor of National Coming Out Day in October 2019, Taylor revealed on Instagram that he had been out as gay for 22 years and encouraged followers to donate to the non-profit Rainbow Railroad.

== Filmography ==
=== Film ===
Year	Title	Role	Notes
2005	Jesus Children of America	Mike	Short film; credited as Robin Taylor
2006	Pitch	Pete	Short film; credited as Robin Taylor
2006	The House is Burning	Phil	Credited as Robin Taylor
2006	Accepted	Abernathy Darwin Dunlap	
2008	Assassination of a High School President	Alex Schneider	Credited as Robin Taylor
2008	August	Guy Employee	
2009	Last Day of Summer	Jason	Credited as Robin Taylor
2010	Step Up 3D	Punk Kid	
2011	Return	Vonnie	Credited as Robin Taylor
2011	Another Earth	Jeff Williams	
2011	The Melancholy Fantastic	Dukken	Credited as Robin Taylor
2012	Would You Rather	Julian	
2013	Cold Comes the Night	Quincy	
2016	Full Dress	Noah	
2019	John Wick: Chapter 3 – Parabellum	Administrator	
2019	The Long Home	Lipscomb	
2019	The Mandela Effect	Matt	
2020	Lost & Found	Randy	Short film
2021	Skeletons	Christopher	Short film

=== Television ===
Year	Title	Role	Notes
2005	Law & Order	Jared Weston	Episode: "Sects"; credited as Robin L. Taylor
2008	Life on Mars	Jimmy	Episode: "My Maharishi Is Bigger Than Your Maharishi"
2008	Law & Order	Dale	Episode: "Personae Non Grata"; credited as Robin L. Taylor
2010	Law & Order	Cedric Stuber	Episode: "Innocence"
2012	Person of Interest	Ajax	Episode: "Blue Code"
2012	The Good Wife	Brock Dalyndro	Episode: "Battle of the Proxies"
2013	Law & Order: Special Victims Unit	Dylan Fuller	Episode: "Traumatic Wound"
2013	The Walking Dead	Sam	Episodes: "Indifference", "No Sanctuary"
2014	Taxi Brooklyn	Sami	Episode: "Precious Cargo"
2014–2019	Gotham	Oswald Cobblepot / The Penguin	Main role
2019, 2025	You	Will Bettelheim	Recurring role (season 2); Guest role (Season 5)
2021	Kevin Can F**k Himself	Nick	Recurring role
2022	Law & Order: Organized Crime	Sebastian McClane	Recurring role
2025	FBI	Scott Collins	Episode: "Startup"

=== Theatre ===
Year	Title	Role	Director	Theatre
2025	Kowalski	Tennessee Williams	Colin Hanlon	The Duke on 42nd Street, Off-Broadway.

=== Video game ===
Year	Title	Role	Notes
2016	Dishonored 2	The Outsider	
2017	Dishonored: Death of the Outsider	The Outsider	

Preceded by Danny DeVito	Penguin actor 2014–2019	Succeeded by Colin Farrell
