= Dishonored (series) =

Video game series

- Genre: Action-adventure
- Developer: Arkane Studios
- Publisher: Bethesda Softworks
- Creators: Raphaël Colantonio; Harvey Smith
- Composer: Daniel Licht
- Platforms: PlayStation 3; Windows; Xbox 360; PlayStation 4; Xbox One; PlayStation 5; Xbox Series X/S
- First release: Dishonored; 9 October 2012
- Latest release: Deathloop; 20 September 2021

Dishonored is a series of action-adventure games developed by Arkane Studios and published by Bethesda Softworks. The franchise started in 2012 with Dishonored. A sequel, Dishonored 2 was released in 2016. A standalone expansion to Dishonored 2, Death of the Outsider, was released in 2017. A follow-up which takes place in the same universe, Deathloop was released in 2021.

== Common elements ==
Dishonored is a series of action-adventure games played from a first-person perspective. In the games, the player explores vast levels to assassinate different targets or complete quests. The player assumes control of an assassin who has access to various supernatural powers, which can be used to navigate a level and defeat enemies. The player can collect runes to upgrade their superpowers, or equip bone charms to unlock further boosts. Dishonored is described as a series of immersive sims. The player is given freedom how they approach their objectives. For instance, the player can use stealth to avoid detection, use powers to eliminate enemies without being noticed, or directly confront opponents using the weapons and the supernatural powers. It is possible for players to complete these games without killing a non-playable character.

The series is often praised for its steampunk and dieselpunk-inspired design; developer Arkane Studios added that the games were inspired by the Victorian style, drawing references from early 1800 to the early 20th century. Dishonored is set in the Empire of the Isles, in a world where technology and supernatural magic co-exist. The major locations in the Isles include Dunwall, the Empire's capital city which uses whale oil as the city's main fuel source, and Karnaca, which is powered by wind turbines fed by currents generated by a cleft mountain along the city's borders. In the main entries, the endings are dependent on the player's chaos level, which is governed by how many characters the player has killed.

== Games ==
=== Dishonored (2012) ===
Release timeline
2012	Dishonored
2013
2014
2015
2016	Dishonored 2
2017	Dishonored: Death of the Outsider
2018
2019
2020
2021	Deathloop

In the first game, Royal Protector Corvo Attano is framed for the assassination of Empress Jessamine Kaldwin. He allies with the Loyalists—a resistance group fighting to reclaim Dunwall, and the Outsider, a supernatural being who grants him magical powers, to restore Kaldwin's daughter, Emily, to the throne.

Dishonored is the first game developed by Arkane Studios after it was acquired by ZeniMax Media and the first game released by Harvey Smith, the co-creator of the Deus Ex franchise, after he joined Arkane in 2008. Arkane's offices in Lyon (led by studio founder Raphaël Colantonio) and Austin (led by Smith) were involved in the game's development. Dishonored was released in October 2012 for PlayStation 3, Windows, and Xbox 360 and it received very positive reviews from critics and became one of the best-selling new video game intellectual properties in the 2010s. Subsequently, Arkane released two downloadable content packs, The Knife of Dunwall and The Brigmore Witches, for the game. Both content packs feature the assassin Daud, who murdered Empress Kaldwin at the beginning of the game.

=== Dishonored 2 (2016) ===
In the second game, the witch Delilah Copperspoon, who claims to be Jessamine's older half-sister and the successor to the throne, topples Emily's rule. The player, who assumes control of either Corvo or Emily, visits Karnaca in search for clues behind Delilah's source of power and attempts to reclaim Emily's throne.

Dishonored 2 was mainly developed by the Lyon office, with Smith serving as its director. Colantonio and the Austin studio shifted their focus to work on Prey. The game was released in November 2016 for PlayStation 4, Windows, and Xbox One. Like Dishonored, the game received very positive reviews upon release. In particular, the game was lauded for its level design, with critics singling out the level "Clockwork Mansion", in which the player transforms a mansion's layout by pulling levers, as its best. However, its physical sales struggled at launch.

=== Dishonored: Death of the Outsider (2017) ===
Dishonored: Death of the Outsider is Dishonored 2's standalone expansion. In the game, assassin Billie Lurk seeks assassin Daud as they set out to eliminate the Outsider.

Marketed as a "standalone story" in the series, the game's story concludes the narrative arc established by the first game. It is not a full sequel to Dishonored 2 as the game is shorter, more linear and more focused. Many systems were streamlined and simplified. For instance, all superpowers are unlocked at the same point of the game, and it does not feature a chaos system. It was released in September 2017 for PlayStation 4, Windows, and Xbox One. The game received generally positive reviews upon release.

=== Deathloop (2021) ===
Deathloop, a first-person shooter by Arkane Lyon and published by Bethesda, was confirmed by game director Dinga Bakaba that it exists in the same universe as the Dishonored series, far in the future after the events of Dishonored: Death of the Outsider. The Dishonored games include some references alluding to Deathloop in addition to the references to the Dishonored series in Deathloop.

=== Future ===
At QuakeCon 2017, lead designer Ricardo Bare said that the series was "resting". Co-director Dinga Bakaba later clarified in 2020, saying that the press had over-interpreted Bare's statement and added that he did not think "there was a decision to put [the] Dishonored series on hold". However, Bakaba reiterated that they would not be revisiting the same storyline in the future, and that subsequent games in the series would only feature new protagonists.

In September 2023, a leaked document by Microsoft revealed a third game, Dishonored 3, was in development at the company during the process of Microsoft acquiring ZeniMax Media.

== Other media ==
Bethesda partnered with Modiphius to create a tabletop role-playing game, which was released in July 2020.

A series of novels by Adam Christopher have also been written inside the universe. These include The Corroded Man, The Return of Daud and The Veiled Terror; it also includes two comic book series, that include The Wyrmwood Deceit and The Peeress and the Price.

The Tales from Dunwall Series of three animated shorts released by games producers in 2012.
