= Daniel Licht =

American composer (1957–2017)

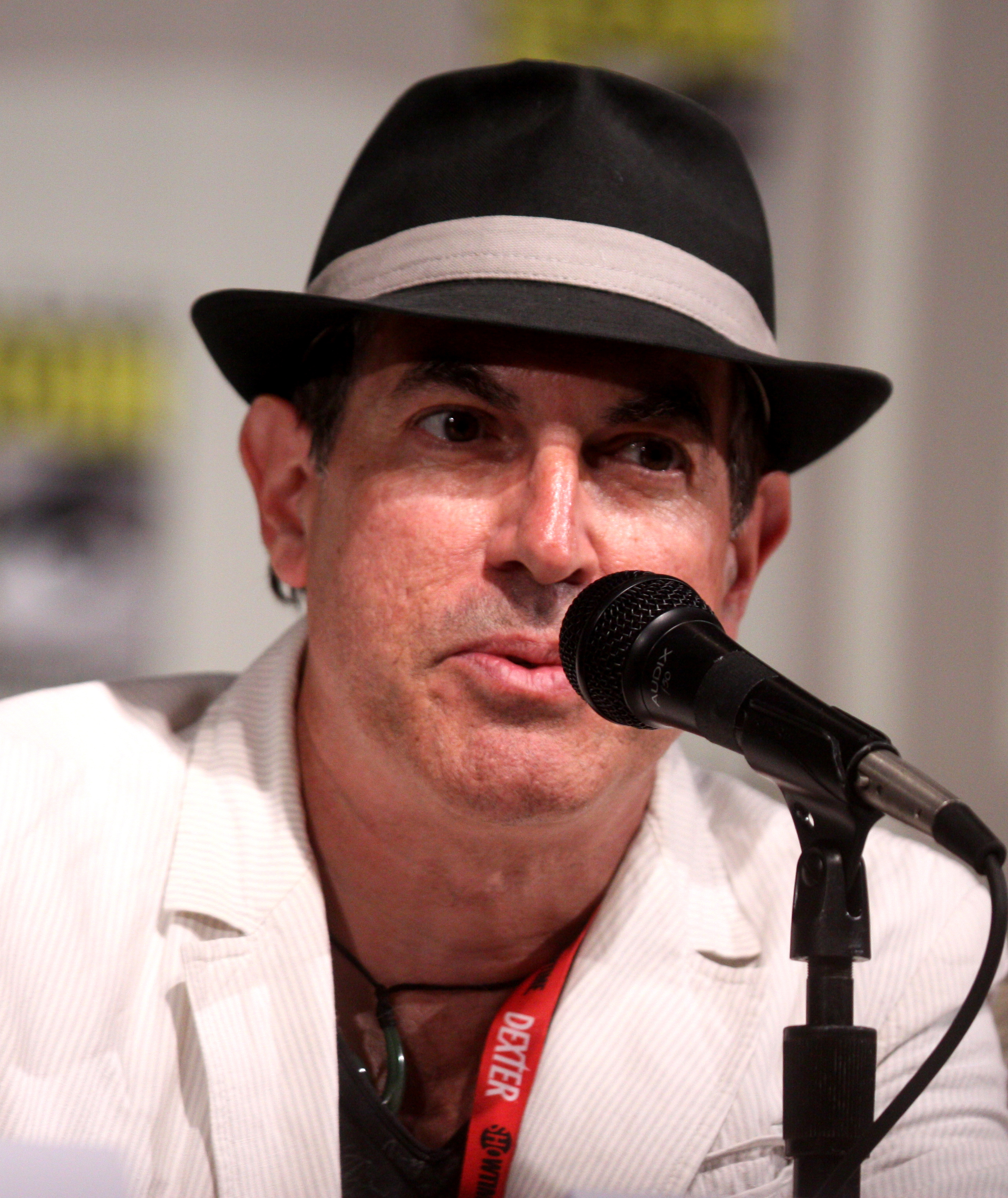
- Licht at San Diego Comic-Con, 2011

Background information
- Born: March 13, 1957
- Died: August 2, 2017 (aged 60) Topanga, California, U.S.
- Genre: Film score
- Occupation: Film composer
- Years active: 1988–2017

Daniel Licht (March 13, 1957 – August 2, 2017) was an American soundtrack composer and musician, best known for writing the score of Showtime TV drama series Dexter.

== Life and career ==
Licht grew up in suburban Detroit and attended the Roeper School, as well as summer school at Berklee College of Music in Boston. He started playing music at the age of eight with his first instrument being the clarinet. He took up the guitar four years later. He began his musical career while still in high school playing guitar with a small jazz ensemble at clubs in the area. Following high school graduation, he attended Hampshire College in Massachusetts and graduated in composition, jazz and world music. Licht moved to New York City and established himself as a musical artist within the Lower East Side music scene. He would travel to Germany, the Netherlands and Northern Europe to perform and compose music for theatre and dance companies. He created scores for such companies as Mercedes-Benz, Sony and AT&T.

He then moved to Los Angeles and pursued a career in film scoring, at the suggestion of his former classmate, Christopher Young. His first major project was the 1991 feature film Children of the Night. His composition earned him his first soundtrack CD release.

Licht scored all seasons of Dexter, which he considered to be one of his "more visible projects", but was reluctant to refer to it as his big break.

In 2012, Licht took over from Akira Yamaoka as the main composer of the Silent Hill video game series; he retained this position until 2015, when Konami decided to shift away from the home console video game industry. He also composed the soundtrack for all three games in the Dishonored series (2012-2017).

Licht died at the age of 60 from sarcoma at his home in Topanga, California, in August 2017. The third Dishonored game, Death of the Outsider, released shortly after his death and was dedicated to his memory.

Licht was assisted by his nephew Jon for his work on Dexter, Dishonored, and Silent Hill.

== Works ==
=== Film ===
Year	Title	Notes
1991	Children of the Night	
1992	Final Embrace	
1992	Amityville: It's About Time	
1992	Severed Ties	
1992	Inside Out III	
1992	Children of the Corn II: The Final Sacrifice	
1992	Inside Out IV	
1993	Acting on Impulse	
1993	Ticks	
1993	Where Are We? Our Trip Through America	
1993	Amityville: A New Generation	
1993	A Girls' Guide to Sex	
1994	The Hard Truth	
1995	Children of the Corn III: Urban Harvest	
1995	Zooman	
1996	Woman Undone	
1996	Hellraiser: Bloodline	
1996	The Winner	
1996	Thinner	
1996	Bad Moon	
1998	The Patron Saint of Liars	
1998	Brave New World	
1998	Legion of Fire: Killer Ants!	
1998	Permanent Midnight	
1998	Thirst	
1999	Splendor	
1999	Don't Look Under the Bed	
1999	Execution of Justice	
2000	Cabin by the Lake	
2000	Hendrix	
2001	Anatomy of a Hate Crime	
2001	Cowboy Up	
2001	Soul Survivors	
2001	Off Season	
2002	Video Voyeur: The Susan Wilson Story	
2004	ABC's of Newborn Baby Care	
2004	King Solomon's Mines	
2005	Icon	
2008	The Memory Keeper's Daughter	
2008	Gym Teacher: The Movie	
2010	Dumbstruck	
2010	Wake	
2016	Ghostmates	

=== Television series ===
Year	Title	Notes
2003	Oliver Beene	
2005–2006	Jake in Progress	
2005–2006	Kitchen Confidential	
2006–2013	Dexter	
2008	Cashmere Mafia	
2009	Maneater	
2010	Romantically Challenged	
2011–2013	Body of Proof	
2012	Don't Trust the B— in Apartment 23	Pilot episode only
2013	Deception	
2014–2015	The Red Road	
2016	Guilt	

=== Video games ===
Year	Title	Notes
2012	Silent Hill: Downpour	
2012	Dishonored	
2012	Silent Hill: Book of Memories	
2016	Dishonored 2	
2017	Dishonored: Death of the Outsider	Posthumous Release
