= Shorpy Higginbotham =

American laborer (1896–1928)

- Born: Henry Sharpe Higginbotham; November 23, 1896; Jefferson County, Alabama
- Died: January 25, 1928 (aged 31)
- Occupation: Coal mine laborer

Henry Sharpe Higginbotham, better known as Shorpy Higginbotham (November 23, 1896 — January 25, 1928) was a laborer in an Alabama coal mine in the early twentieth century. He served in World War I before returning to the mines, where he was killed by a falling rock in 1928. Higginbotham was the subject of a series of photographs by Lewis Hine that showed him as a boy working in the dangerous environment of a coal mine. He is the namesake of the historical photography blog Shorpy.com, where he has become a symbol of child labor in the United States.
