= Shorpy.com =

Vintage Photography Blog

Shorpy.com is a vintage photography blog. It posts digitally enhanced photographs acquired from a variety of sources, including the Library of Congress and National Archives. Most of the photographs presented on the website date to the early twentieth century. Former newspaper editors Dave Hall and Ken Booth run the site.

== Namesake ==
The blog is named after Shorpy Higginbotham, a child laborer who worked as a greaser in an Alabama coal mine. His portrait is Shorpy.com's logo. Higginbotham was killed in a mining accident in 1928.

== Media reception ==
Shorpy.com has received acclaim from a variety of media outlets, including The Washington Post, Time, The Guardian, The Times, and The Independent.
