= Narrative designer =

Video game development role

A narrative designer, or interactive narrative designer, is a role in contemporary video game development, the focus of which is to design the narrative elements of a game based on how players interact with its story, which differentiates it from video game writing.

In their 2018 talk at the Game Developers Conference, writer and narrative designer duo Molly Maloney and Eric Stirpe describe the difference as one where the writer focuses on the characters within the game, while the designer focuses on the player's experience of the story. Thus the role of the narrative designer in interactive storytelling is unique in that it is an active process to create a story through a player's navigation of a dataspace. The confusion about the role comes from it being used interchangeably, to describe roles like content designer, quest designer and game writer, due to the relative overlap in their activities. In smaller game development studios, narrative designers will often be tasked with these responsibilities, as well as co-directing voice acting and sometimes even motion capture recordings.

Because of this, narrative designers need to actively collaborate with many other departments to coordinate their efforts towards a unified narrative vision. In larger game development studios this task is often also overseen by a narrative director.

== Function within game writing ==
Within game writing, the term narrative design has also been used to describe a planning phase that a writer goes through when they are hired in an advanced stage of a project's development. By this time, when a project has already taken shape, the writer tends to start their work by first making an inventory of all the available spaces and means through which the story can be told. Such as how many cutscenes are planned, how many lines of dialogue can be displayed in a speech bubble, how many environments and characters are expected to be in the game and so forth. This process helps a writer get a better insight into the project's available story space and thus a better understanding about how the existing gameplay experience can be enhanced through storytelling.

Finding resources to help translate the game's material also falls under the job of a narrative designer. Sound design, adding music, storyboard animatics and other components are made as prototypes for testing before finalizing the game. Adapting to any possible changes made in the narration is crucial to creating a smooth play-through.

In addition, real-life inspiration is principal to creating the most authentic experiences for the player. While designing Ghost Recon: Future Soldier, Red Storm Entertainment's Expert Narrative Designer, Jay Posey, spoke to special ops veterans to learn more about their personal experiences and stories. He mentions the "human element" which is key to making any successful story as it allows the viewer to relate to the characters' emotions and purpose.

== Origins of the term ==
The term Narrative Designer was first used in regards to games by Stephen E. Dinehart IV as the title of a job position while he was working for THQ Nordic. Monolith then started posting job listings using the term around 2011. In 2013 Microsoft officially formalized and coined the term which helped lead to the term being more widely used in the industry.

== Outside of game development ==
The idea of narrative design was perhaps first used in 1997 by Madison Smartt Bell in the context of writing books. His book, "Narrative Design: A Writer's Guide to Structure" describes a practical, structuralist approach to story creation in a manner similar to how a designer would.

It should therefore come as no surprise that narrative design is also commonly applied within fields like industrial design, product design, architecture, marketing and experience design. Here, narrative theory is used to enhance or influence the user's experience of a product, service or messaging campaign in order to create additional value.

However, despite how these various practices are purposefully referred to as narrative design, it is uncommon for writers or designers outside of the game development sphere to exclusively market themselves as narrative designers professionally.

Another use for narrative design is education. A study by the University of Oslo discusses how augmented reality can be used for storytelling of historical and cultural events through narrative design. AR simulations not only require documents, photos, recordings, and maps, but also the complex construction of how the storytelling impacts the viewer's experience.

Especially with the rapid use of technology within education and celebrating cultural heritage, narrative design has become increasingly relevant in bringing authentic stories to life.
