= Corvo Attano =

Fictional character in the Dishonored series

- Dishonored character
- Corvo as seen in Dishonored.
- First appearance: Dishonored (2012)
- Voiced by: Stephen Russell

In-universe information
- Family: Paloma Attano (mother); Beatrici Attano (sister)
- Significant other: Jessamine Kaldwin (lover)
- Children: Emily Kaldwin (daughter)

Corvo Attano is a fictional character and the main protagonist of Arkane Studios' Dishonored series. He is the lead protagonist in Dishonored, one of two playable protagonists in Dishonored 2, and has appeared in multiple Dishonored works, including a comic series, and the first published book of a trilogy of novels announced in 2016.

== Concept and creation ==
The early development of the character was based on 17th century London attire, and was similar in appearance to that of the character Garrett from the game series Thief. The original concept was abandoned as the universe developed into its eventual form, described as "whalepunk". Unlike other characters in the first game, Corvo remains silent during all conversations. Corvo was left deliberately "blank", allowing the player to decide on his motivations depending on their play style. During alpha, the developers experimented with giving the player some text input options, though this was not developed further. According to co-creators Raphael Colantonio and Harvey Smith, the choice to omit dialogue, in the original incarnation, was an attempt to allow players to develop his personality through their own actions, and avoid incorporating elements into dialogue which may conflict with those choices, explaining that an angry or revenge-driven Corvo may go against non-lethal play styles. Writer Austin Grossman felt that the personal relationship between Corvo and other characters helped make him a more relatable character than other silent protagonists.

Corvo was initially not intended to be playable in Dishonored 2, but was included alongside his daughter, Emily Kaldwin, due to nostalgia for the character by the development team. When designing his outfit for Dishonored 2, developer Sergei Kolesov wanted it to make sense for his position in society while reflecting his return to being an assassin. They also gave him voice acting in the sequel, noting that they simply assumed aspects of the character in the first game. Corvo's personality was also made more assertive. Giving him a voice also created narrative contrast, according to Harvey Smith, to Emily, explaining that they have different experiences due to multiple factors. He was voiced by Stephen Russell in Dishonored 2.

== Appearances ==
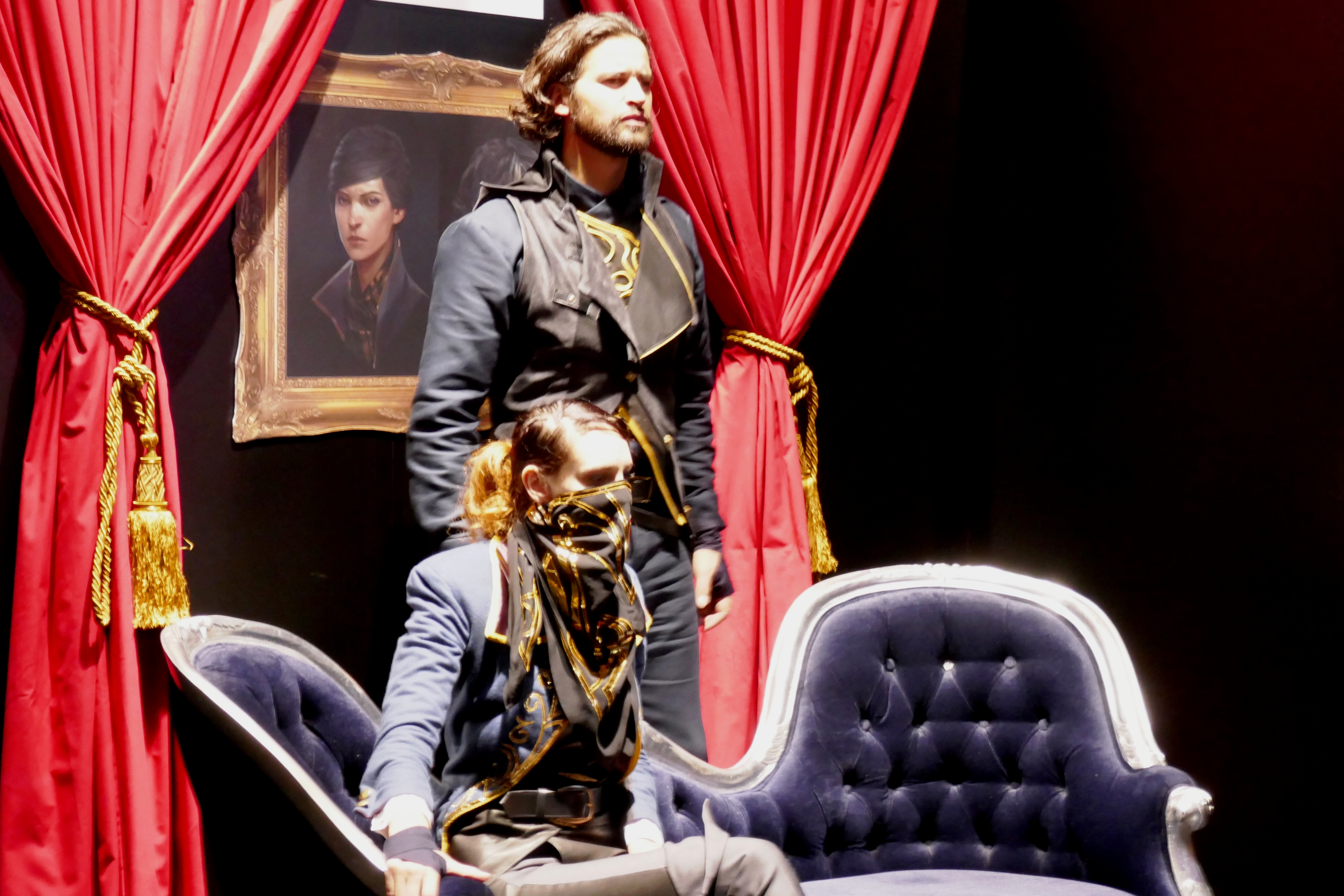
Actors portraying Corvo and Emily at Paris Games Week 2016

Corvo first appears in the 2012 video game Dishonored. At the beginning of the game, he serves as the bodyguard of a character named Jessamine, the Empress of the game's fictional monarchy. When the empress is assassinated, Corvo is blamed for her murder. He is imprisoned and tortured for six months before escaping and becoming wanted and hunted by the people who assassinated Jessamine. He is accompanied by his daughter, Emily Kaldwin.

In the second game, where Corvo is one of two playable characters, he appears 15 years older than at the conclusion of the first, and the story progresses with the other playable character, Emily, having now grown into adulthood. Corvo now serves as Emily's Royal Protector and Spymaster. As creative director Harvey Smith addressed the dilemma posed by the interaction between the two, saying Corvo was "wondering how long he can keep protecting his daughter ... He knows that someday somebody's going to come for her, because she's the Empress, and she needs to be able to stand on her own". Jessamine's purported half-sister, Delilah, serves as the game's main antagonist.

Corvo appears repeatedly in the graphic novel Dishonored: The Dunwall Archives, released by Dark Horse Comics. He also appears in the leading role in a comic mini-series by Gordon Rennie and Andrea Olimpieri, entitled Dishonored: The Wyrmwood Deceit, released August 3 through October 19, 2016. The full set was also released as a graphic novel collection on November 29 of the same year. The series is set twelve years after the conclusion of the events of the first game, and centers on his attempts to find an apprentice to serve as his heir. Dishonored: The Corroded Man, created by Adam Christopher, also features Corvo, who trains and fights alongside Emily while the gang responsible for Jessamine's assassination is reformed.

== Reception ==
The character of Corvo Attano received critical acclaim. In 2013, Complex rated Corvo number thirty among "The 50 Most Badass Video Game Characters Of All Time". TGN named him sixth on their list of all-time best video game assassins, calling him a "perfect mix of silence and aggression", while Tim Horton of Creative.co, and senior writer for Now Loading, named him seventh in his same list for Movie Pilot.

In their book, The Dark Side of Game Play, Mortensen, Linderoth, and Brown examine Corvo and his in-game actions as a motif revolving around vengeance. As they phrase the moral delimma posed by the character's actions: "Virtuous Corvo would not pursue personally motivated revenge but might find his actions justified due to the offenses committed". They continue, emphasizing that vengeance is, "connected to a dark emotion because it is associated with a negative and often powerful sensation about wanting and believing that retaliation will make up for the injustice caused".

Robert Rath, writing for The Escapist, saw Corvo as a man tested and tempted by a demonic figure (the Outsider). Corvo is provided by the Outsider the tools and, with the Heart, the justifications for killing, with the gameplay incentivizing taking a more violent approach. Rath sees a low chaos Corvo as "a good man who holds onto his morals as the world beats him down", in contrast to the higher chaos Corvo who gives into his "baser instincts".

In another article Rath, with contributions by Dr. Stephen Banks of the University of Reading, looked at Corvo's actions through the lens of British 18th and 19th century honor culture. They note that Corvo, despite being former Lord Protector, and the truth of his ousting being fully believed by Loyalist, is nonetheless referred to by first name even by servants, and in many ways treated like a servant, sent to run errands. His social status as an outcast was useful to the Loyalists initially. They continue: "Corvo does all the tasks the blue bloods of the Loyalist Conspiracy are unable to perform because it might sully their reputations". Finally they conclude that:

Corvo's dishonor made him a useful tool to the Loyalists, that his work for them debased his reputation further, and that ultimately, the Loyalist leaders found out - to their eventual ruin - that Corvo didn't play by their elegant rules.
