= List of Native American video game characters =

A study was published in 2009 by the University of Southern California called "The Virtual Census: Representations of Gender, Race and Age in Video Games" that showed that Native Americans are underrepresented in video games. This is a dynamic list of Native American video game characters that excludes sports and music titles. It includes characters that are portrayed as Indigenous peoples of the Americas.

== Native American characters ==
This list includes player characters (PC) or named non-player characters (NPC) that are Native Americans. Unnamed non-playable characters are in the list below.

Character	Game	Release year	Role	Ethnicity	Notes	Ref.
	Apachacha	1993	PC	Native American	Protagonist	(Note: This main character is unnamed.)
	The Oregon Trail	2021	PC	Native American		
	This Land Is My Land	2019	PC	Native American	Protagonist	
Michael Abila	Tell Me Why	2020	NPC	Tlinglit		
Agueybana	Civilization IV: Colonization	2008	NPC	Arawak		(Note: This character is based on an historical person.)
Ajidamoo	When Rivers Were Trails	2019	NPC	Anishinaabe, Cree, Oneida		
Fareeha Amari (aka Pharah)	Overwatch	2016	PC	First Nations and Egyptian		
Andar	Turok: Escape from Lost Valley	2019	NPC	Native American	Turok's brother	
Apache Chief	LEGO Dimensions	2015		Apache		
Aritana	Aritana and the Harpy's Feathef	2014	PC	Indigenous Brazilian		
Aritana	Aritana and the Twin Masks	2019	PC	Indigenous Brazilian		
Atl	Expeditions: Conquistador	2013	NPC	Taíno	Shaman	
Axe Rider	Age of Empires III: The WarChiefs	2006	NPC	Lakota		(Note: This character is known by its role, rather than by a formal name.)
Ayabe	When Rivers Were Trails	2019	NPC	Anishinaabe, Cree, Oneida		
Bella	When Rivers Were Trails	2019	NPC	Anishinaabe, Cree, Oneida		
Bimibisa	When Rivers Were Trails	2019	NPC	Anishinaabe, Cree, Oneida		
Amelia Black	Age of Empires III: The WarChiefs	2006	NPC	Iroquois and Scottish	Nathaniel Black's daughter	
Chayton Black	Age of Empires III: The WarChiefs	2006	PC	Iroquois, Scottish, and Lakota-Sioux	Nathaniel Black's grandson	
Nathaniel Black	Age of Empires III: The WarChiefs	2006	PC	Iroquois and Scottish		
Blackwood Archer	Age of Empires III: The WarChiefs	2006	NPC	Tupi		
Blowgunner	Age of Empires III: The WarChiefs	2006	NPC	Kalinago		
Bolas Warrior	Age of Empires III: The WarChiefs	2006	NPC	Inca		
Brave	Brave: The Search for Spirit Dancer	2005	PC	Native American	Protagonist; playable as a male or female	
Brave	Brave: A Warrior's Tale	2009	PC	Native American	Protagonist; playable as a male or female	
Calm Water	Call of Juarez	2006	NPC	Apache	Chief	
Julia Chang	Tekken 3	1997	PC	Native American and Chinese		
Michelle Chang	Tekken	1994	PC	Native American and Chinese		
Chief Macalosh "Wild One"	Dangerous Streets	1993	PC	Sioux	Spiritual leader	
Chief Scalpem (aka Wigwam)	Sunset Riders	1991	NPC	Native American		
Chief Thunder (aka hinnamatoom)	Killer Instinct	1994	PC	Nez Perce		
Chief Thunder (aka hinnamatoom)	Killer Instinct	2013	PC	Nez Perce		
Clubman	Age of Empires III: The WarChiefs	2006	NPC	Nootka		
Code Talker	Metal Gear Solid V: The Phantom Pain	2015	NPC	Navajo		
Mangas Coloradas	Civilization IV: Colonization	2008	NPC	Apache		
Condor Heads	Breakers	1996	PC	Native American		
Crazy Horse	Age of Empires III: The WarChiefs	2006	NPC	Lakota		
Cuauhtemoc	Age of Empires III: The WarChiefs	2006	PC	Aztec	War Chief	
Cunhambebe	Civilization IV: Colonization	2008	NPC	Tupi		
Cyborg 005	Cyborg 009	1994		Native American		
Dances with Barlog	MapleStory	2003	NPC	Native American		
Devil Hawk	Gun.Smoke	1985	NPC	Comanche		
Eagle (aka tipyeléhne)	Killer Instinct	1994	PC	Nez Perce	Thunder's brother	
Eagle (aka tipyeléhne)	Killer Instinct	2013	PC	Nez Perce	Thunder's brother	
Eagle Flies	Red Dead Redemption 2	2018	NPC	Wapiti (fictional)	Rains Falls' son	
Paul Eagle Star	When Rivers Were Trails	2019	NPC	Anishinaabe, Cree, Oneida		
Eagle Warrier	Age of Empires III: The WarChiefs	2006	NPC	Aztec		
Anna Elk Moon	Santa Fe Mysteries: The Elk Moon Murder	1996	NPC	Native American	Famous artist (fictional)	
Enisi	Prey	2006	NPC	Cherokee	Domasi "Tommy" Tawodi's grandfather	
David Falk	Dino Crisis 2	2000		Native American		
Falling Star	Red Dead Revolver	2004	NPC	Red Wolf (fictional)		
Fights-At-Dawn	Gun	2005	NPC	Blackfoot	Chief	
Danielle Fireseed	Turok 3: Shadow of Oblivion	2000	PC	Native American		
Joshua Fireseed	Turok 2: Seeds of Evil	1998	PC	Native American		
Joshua Fireseed	Turok: Rage Wars	1999	PC	Native American		
Joshua Fireseed	Turok 3: Shadow of Oblivion	2000	PC	Native American		
Joshua Fireseed	Turok	2008	PC	Native American		
Forest Prowler	Age of Empires III: The WarChiefs	2006	NPC	Iroquois		
Gall	Age of Empires III: The WarChiefs	2006	PC	Sioux	Chief	
Galuda	Power Stone	1999	PC	Native American	Shaman	
Red Harlow	Red Dead Revolver	2004	PC	Half Native American	Protagonist	
Huayna Capac	Civilization IV: Colonization	2008	NPC	Incas		
Thunder Hawk	Super Street Fighter II Turbo	1994	PC	Thunderfoot (fictional)		
Thunder Hawk	Street Fighter Alpha 3	1998	PC	Thunderfoot (fictional)		
Thunder Hawk	Ultra Street Fighter II: The Final Challengers	2017	PC	Thunderfoot (fictional)		
Thunder Hawk	Super Street Fighter IV	2018	PC	Thunderfoot (fictional)		
Wolf Hawkfield	Virtua Fighter	1993	PC	First Nations		
Wolf Hawkfield	Fighters Megamix	1996	PC	First Nations		
Hiawatha	Age of Empires III: The WarChiefs	2006	PC	Iroquois	War Chief	
Meeygen Hill	Hill Agency: PURITYdecay	2023	PC	Néhinaw		
Holcan Spearman	Age of Empires III: The WarChiefs	2006	NPC	Maya		
Horse Runner	Age of Empires III: The WarChiefs	2006	NPC	Comanche		
Huaminca	Age of Empires III: The WarChiefs	2006	NPC	Inca		
Huayna Capac	Age of Empires III: The WarChiefs	2006	PC	Inca		
Humba Wumba	Banjo-Tooie	2000	NPC	Native American	Woman shaman	
Humba Wumba	Banjo-Kazooie: Nuts & Bolts	2008	NPC	Native American	Woman shaman	
Isabela	Expeditions: Conquistador	2013	NPC	Taíno and Spanish		
Jaguar Warrier	Age of Empires III: The WarChiefs	2006	NPC	Aztec		
Janitor	Elvira II: The Jaws of Cerberus	1992	NPC	Native American		
Jen	Prey	2006	NPC	Cherokee	Domasi "Tommy" Tawodi's girlfriend	
Kahhori	Marvel Future Fight	2015		Mowhawk		
Kaniehtí꞉io (aka Ziio)	Assassin's Creed III	2012	NPC	Mohawk		
Kanya Horseman	Age of Empires III: The WarChiefs	2006	NPC	Iroquois		
Kesegowaase	Assassin's Creed Rogue	2014	NPC	Abenaki		
Lady Six Sky	Civilization VI	2016	PC	Maya	Leader	
Lakota Dog Soldier	Age of Empires III: The WarChiefs	2006	NPC	Lakota		
Lautaro	Civilization VI: Rise and Fall	2018	PC	Mapuche		
Lily	Street Fighter 6	2023	PC	Thunderfoot (fictional)		
Little Chief	Cowboy Kid	1991	NPC	Native American		
Logan	Civilization IV: Colonization	2008	NPC	Iroquois		
Makwa	When Rivers Were Trails	2019	NPC	Anishinaabe, Cree, Oneida		
Man-of-Bats	Scribblenauts Unmasked: A DC Comics Adventure	2013	NPC	Lakota	Chief	
Many Wounds	Gun	2005	NPC	Apache		
Desmond Miles	Assassin's Creed	2007	PC	Mohawk and English	Protagonist	
Desmond Miles	Assassin's Creed II	2009	PC	Mohawk and English	Protagonist	
Desmond Miles	Assassin’s Creed: Brotherhood	2010	PC	Mohawk and English	Protagonist	
Desmond Miles	Assassin’s Creed: Revelations	2010	PC	Mohawk and English	Protagonist	
Desmond Miles	Assassin's Creed III	2012	PC	Mohawk and English	Protagonist	
Montezuma II	Civilization IV: Colonization	2008	NPC	Aztec		
Montezuma II	Civilization VI	2016	PC	Aztec		
Nahova	Tao Taido	1993	PC	Native American	Warrior	
Nastas	Red Dead Redemption	2010	NPC	Native American		
Natan	Shadow Hearts: From the New World	2005	PC	Garvoy (fictional)		
Nightwolf	Mortal Kombat 3	1995	PC	Matoka (fictional)		
Nightwolf	Mortal Kombat: Deception;	2004	PC	Matoka (fictional)		
Nightwolf	Mortal Kombat: Armageddon	2006	PC	Matoka (fictional)		
Nightwolf	Mortal Kombat 11	2019	PC	Matoka (fictional)		
Noembelu (aka Little Eagle)	Street Fighter Alpha 3	1998	PC	Thunderfoot (fictional)		
Nuna	Never Alone	2014	PC	Iñupiaq		
Oconostota	Civilization IV: Colonization	2008	NPC	Cherokee		
Opía Apito	Assassin's Creed IV: Black Flag	2013	NPC	Taíno		
Oshiki-inini	When Rivers Were Trails	2019	NPC	Anishinaabe, Cree, Oneida		
Owlwoman	Scribblenauts Unmasked: A DC Comics Adventure	2013	NPC	Cherokee		
Pachacuti	Civilization VI	2016	PC	Incan		
Pachacuti	Civilization VII	2025	PC	Incan		
Pakawa	Kasumi Ninja	1994	PC	Comanche Tu-Wee-Kah		
Player 2	Blood Bros.	1990	PC	Native American		
Pocahontas	Legend of Pocahontas	2002	PC	Powhatan		
Pocahontas (Disney)	Pocahontas: Riverbend Adventures	1995	NPC, PC	Powhatan		
Pocahontas (Disney)	Disney's Animated Storybook: Pocahontas	1995	NPC, PC	Powhatan		
Pocahontas (Disney)	Disney's Pocahontas	1996	NPC, PC	Powhatan		
Pocahontas (Disney)	Disney Tsum Tsum	2014	NPC, PC	Powhatan		
Pocahontas (Disney)	Disney Emoji Blitz	2016	NPC, PC	Powhatan		
Pocahontas (Disney)	Disney Magic Kingdoms	2016	NPC, PC	Powhatan		
Pocahontas (Disney)	Disney Heroes: Battle Mode	2018	NPC, PC	Powhatan		
Pocahontas (Disney)	Disney Sorcerer’s Arena	2020	NPC, PC	Powhatan		
Pontiac	American Conquest: Fight Back	2002	NPC	Odawa		
Poundmaker	Civilization VI	2016	PC	Plains Cree	Leader	
Puma Spearman	Age of Empires III: The WarChiefs	2006	NPC	Aztec		
Rains Falls	Red Dead Redemption 2	2018	NPC	Wapiti (fictional)	Chief and father of Eagle Flies	
Ratonhnhaké:ton (aka Connor Kenway)	Assassin's Creed III	2012	PC	Mohawk and English	Protagonist	
Ratonhnhaké:ton (aka Connor Kenway)	Assassin's Creed III: The Tyranny of King Washington	2012	PC	Mohawk and English	Protagonist	
Raven	Nightmare Circus	1996	PC	Native American		
Raven Red	Scribblenauts Unmasked: A DC Comics Adventure	2013	NPC	Lakota	Man-of-Bats' son	
Red Cloud	Age of Empires III: The WarChiefs	2006	NPC	Lakota		
Red Leaf	When Rivers Were Trails	2019	NPC	Anishinaabe, Cree, Oneida		
Rifle Ridger	Age of Empires III: The WarChiefs	2006	PC	Sioux		
Rifleman	Age of Empires III: The WarChiefs	2006	NPC	Cherokee		
Delsin Rowe	Infamous Second Son	2014	PC	Akomish (fictional)		(Note: Although the video game uses a fictional tribal name and location, it was based on the actual Duwamish Native American tribe in the Seattle, Washington area.)
Reggie Rowe	Infamous Second Son	2014	NPC	Akomish (fictional)	Delsin Rowe's brother	
Running Moon	Red Dead Revolver	2004	NPC	Red Wolf (fictional)	Chief	
Running River (aka Calm Water	Call of Juarez: Bound in Blood	2009	NPC	Apache	Chief	
Scout	Age of Empires III: The WarChiefs	2006	NPC	Native American		
Seeing Farther	Call of Juarez: Bound in Blood	2009	NPC	Apache	Running River's son	
Shadow Wolf	Red Dead Revolver	2004	NPC	Red Wolf (fictional)	Red Harlow's cousin	
Shadow Wolf	Red Dead Redemption	2010	NPC	Red Wolf (fictional)	Red Harlow's cousin	
Shania	Shadow Hearts: From the New World	2005	PC	Garvoy (fictional)		
Sharktooth Bowman	Age of Empires III: The WarChiefs	2006	NPC	Iroquois		
Singing Elk	When Rivers Were Trails	2019	NPC	Anishinaabe, Cree, Oneida		
Sitting Bull	Civilization IV: Beyond the Sword	2007	PC	Sioux		
Sitting Bull	Civilization IV: Colonization	2008	NPC	Sioux		
Sitting Bull	Age of Empires III: The WarChiefs	2006	NPC	Lakota		
Skull Knight	Age of Empires III: The WarChiefs	2006	NPC	Aztec		
Small Bear	When Rivers Were Trails	2019	NPC	Anishinaabe, Cree, Oneida		
Charles Smith	Red Dead Redemption 2	2018	NPC	Native American and African American		
Soaring Eagle	Whomp 'Em	1991	PC	Native American	Protagonist	
Spirit Dancer	Brave: The Search for Spirit Dancer	2005	NPC	Native American	Shaman	
Rick Strowd	Real Bout Fatal Fury 2: The Newcomers	1998	PC	Native American and Caucasian		
Sukurúame	Mulaka	2018	PC	Tarahumara	Shaman	
Tala	Darkwatch: Curse of the West	2005	NPC	Native American	Vampire	
Tal'Set (aka Turok)	Turok: Dinosaur Hunter	1997	PC	Native American		(Note: This character originated in a comic book series and was identified as a pre-Columbian member of the Mandan in issue one. The video game does not specify a tribal affiliation.)
Tal'Set (aka Turok)	Turok: Battle of the Bionosaurs;	1997	PC	Native American		(Note: This character originated in a comic book series and was identified as a pre-Columbian member of the Mandan in issue one. The video game does not specify a tribal affiliation.)
Tal'Set (aka Turok)	Turok: Evolution	2002	PC	Native American		(Note: This character originated in a comic book series and was identified as a pre-Columbian member of the Mandan in issue one. The video game does not specify a tribal affiliation.)
Tal'Set (aka Turok)	Turok: Escape from Lost Valley	2019	PC	Native American		(Note: This character originated in a comic book series and was identified as a pre-Columbian member of the Mandan in issue one. The video game does not specify a tribal affiliation.)
Domasi "Tommy" Tawodi	Prey	2006	PC	Cherokee		
Domasi "Tommy" Tawodi	Prey Mobile 3D	2007	PC	Cherokee		
Tayanna	Expeditions: Conquistador	2013	NPC	Native American		
Tecumseh	Civilization VII	2025	PC	Shawnee	Chief and warrior	
Tiger Lily	Code Name: S.T.E.A.M.	2015	PC	Piccaninny (fictional)		
Tomahawk Warrior	Age of Empires III: The WarChiefs	2006	NPC	Iroquois		
Tonto	The Lone Ranger	1991	NPC	Native American	Lone Ranger's partner	
Totec	Lara Croft and the Guardian of Light	2010	NPC	Mayan		
Tracker	Age of Empires III: The WarChiefs	2006	NPC	Cree		
Uncle Kanyenke	Age of Empires III: The WarChiefs	2006	NPC	Iroquois		
Vulcan Raven	Metal Gear Solid	1998	NPC	Alaska native and Inuit		
Wabishkio	When Rivers Were Trails	2019	NPC	Anishinaabe, Cree, Oneida		
Wakina Rifleman	Age of Empires III: The WarChiefs	2006	PC	Sioux		
Wakosh	When Rivers Were Trails	2019	NPC	Anishinaabe, Cree, Oneida		
Wasu Maza	When Rivers Were Trails	2019	NPC	Anishinaabe, Cree, Oneida		
Colton White	Gun	2005	PC	Apache and Caucasian	Protagonist	
Colton White	Gun: Showdown	2006	PC	Apache and Caucasian	Protagonist	
Wild Wolf Chief	Cowboy Kid	1991	NPC	Native American		
Wolf Chief	Gun.Smoke	1985	NPC	Native American		
Yakari	Yakari: The Mystery of Four Seasons	2015	PC	Native American	Protagonist	

== Unnamed non-playable characters ==
The following video games include unnamed Native Americans as non-playable characters.

Game	Release year	Ethnicities	Role	Ref.
American Conquest: Fight Back	2002	Aztec, Haida, Maya	NPC	
America: No Peace Beyond the Line	2001	Sioux	NPC	
Custer's Revenge	1982	Native American	NPC	(Note: The goal of this pornographic game was to rape a Native American woman.)
Don't Wake The Night	2019	Guaraní	NPC	
Indian Attack	1983	Native American	NPC	
Indian Battle	1980	Native American	NPC	
Hammer Boy	1990	Native American	NPC	
Indian Battle	1980	Native American	NPC	
Kane	1985	Wagari	NPC	
Kane	1986	Native American	NPC	
Kona	2017	Cree, Algonquin	NPC	
Law of the West	1985	Native American	NPC	
The Oregon Trail	1985	Native American	NPC	
The Oregon Trail	2021	Native American	NPC	
Outlaws	1985	Native American	NPC	
Sid Meier's Colonization	1994	Apache, Arawak, Aztec, Cherokee, Inca, Iroquois, Sioux, Tupi	NPC	

== See also ==
- Race and video games
- Indigenous people in video games
- List of black video game characters
- List of video games with LGBTQ characters
