= Indigenous people in video games =

Indigenous people have created and collaborated on video games, such as John Romero, co-designer of Doom, and Allen Turner, who has worked as a designer on a wide range of titles including Stubbs the Zombie in Rebel Without a Pulse. Indigenous people have also conveyed their cultures through games, such as Never Alone and Thunderbird Strike.

While many early video games and their iterations which depict Indigenous people misrepresent them and perpetuate negative stereotypes, video games created by Indigenous people enable self-determination. Increasingly, there has been growth in community organizing around Indigenous games worldwide. Indigenous developers and their video games have been featured in exhibitions including the DIGITAL MEDIA ART+CADE as part of imagineNATIVE, Memories of the Future/Souvenirs du futur at SAW Video Media Art Centre, and REGENERATION: Breaking Time with Indigenous Video Games at the Western Front.

== Games where Indigenous people represent themselves ==
Indigenous people have been involved in a range of video game projects where they have the opportunity to depict themselves. These games range in the style, from collaboration that involves consulting with a limited Indigenous people (including Assassin's Creed III) to games that are entirely developed and designed by Indigenous people, such as Never Alone and Thunderbird Strike.

- Aboriginal History Media Arts Lab (Techno Medicine Wheel [2008] in a collaboration between Cease Wyss and Elizabeth LaPensée)
- Aboriginal Peoples Television Network (Animism The Game [2010], Mawisowin [2012], and Your Mix [2008])
- Aboriginal Territories in Cyberspace Skins Workshops (Otsì:! Rise of the Kanien’kehá:ka Legends [2009], The Adventures of Skahiòn:hati: Legend of Stone Giant [2011], Skahiòn:hati: Rise of the Kanien’kehá:ka Legends [2012], Ienién:te and the Peacemaker's Wampum [2013], He Ao Hou [2017], Wao Kanaka: Realm of the People [2018])
- Achimostawinan Games (Hill Agency: PURITY&decay [2023], Sealskin [2016])
- Arviat Code Club
- Black Cherry Digital Productions (Path of the Elders [2010] in partnership between the Mushkegowuk Cree, Carlton University, and Pinegrove Productions)
- Brujería at Werk (1870—Cyberpunk Forever [2018], Don't Wake the Night [2019])
- Coyote Science Inc. (Coyote Quest [2017], a collaboration between Loretta Todd and Elizabeth LaPensée)
- Green Circle Productions (Manidoonsug: Little Spirits [2015] in consultation with Mississauga New Credit and Anishinaabe around the Greater Toronto Area)
- Guilherme Meneses (Huni Kuin [2016] in a collaboration with the Kanixawá tribe of Brazil and Peru)
- Indian Land Tenure Foundation (When Rivers Were Trails [2019] in collaboration with Elizabeth LaPensée and the Games for Entertainment and Learning Lab)
- Metia Interactive (Guardian Maia: Episode 1 [2019] and Episode 2 [forthcoming], Maori Pa Wars: Indigenous Tower Defense)
- Monigarr (Kakwitene VR [2019])
- Northern Plains Games (Tipi Kaga [2019])
- Ogoki Learning Systems (Babaamosedaa Let's Go for a Walk [2014], Brokenhead Bingo [2015], and Rez Bomb [2015])
- Raanaa - The Shaman Girl, episodes 1-6 (Miksapix Interactive [Android/iOS, 2017-2023 ], idea developed by indigenous Sámi Mikkel Sara & written by Teresá Joret Mariánná ((Marjaana Auranen)), developed by Red Stage Entertainment)
- Raindrop Games (Arrival: Village Kasike [2012] partnered with Roberto Mukaro Borrero and the United Confederation of Taino People)
- Revolve (Music Mogul [2014] with Indigenous musicians including A Tribe Called Red, Elisapie, Joey Stylez, Madeskimo, and Red City)
- Skábma - Snowfall (Red Stage Entertainment [2022], with indigenous Sámi co-owner & writer Teresá Joret Mariánná and Northern Sámi artists and voice-actors)
- Silver Spook Games (Neofeud 1 [2020], Neofeud 2 [forthcoming])
- SlipCycle (Terra Nova [2019])
- Upper One Games (Never Alone [2014])
- Veselekov (Umurangi Generation [2020])
- Virtual Songlines (Virtual Awaba [2018])
- Wisdom of the Elders with Elizabeth LaPensée (Survivance [2011])
- Yijala Yala Productions, part of Big hART (Love Punks [2012])

== Games including Indigenous languages ==
There are also numerous video games which include or have been fully translated into Indigenous languages. MoniGarr produces many Indigenous language games for multiple platforms. Both of the video games made by kānaka maoli participants of the Skins Video Game workshops held in Hawai'i, He Ao Hou [2017] and Wao Kanaka: Realm of the People [2018], were designed so that the player can play in ‘Ōlelo Hawai‘i as well as in English. Similarly, Karihonniennihtshera (Teachings) by Kahentawaks Tiewishaw can be played in English, wherein it teaches the player how to identify flora and fauna in the Kanien’kéha language, or played entirely in Kanien’kéha.

Adventure game Skábma - Snowfall was translated and voice-acted in endangered Norther Sámi language. The game was awarded as a Nordic Game of The Year and The Best Art awards in Nordic Game and The Best Creative Achievement of the Year 2022 in Finnish Game Award 2023. Northern Sámi language option is also included to Raanaa - The Shaman Girl game.

Full immersion is a design preference for some Indigenous game developers. Honour Water [2016] is a singing game entirely in Anishinaabemowin, much like the virtual reality game Along the River of Spacetime [2020]. Carl Petersen emphasizes full immersion in his games, which include Lakota instructions.

In addition, there are games that have been localized to Indigenous languages. For example, Pinnguaq localized Osmos and Ittle Dew to Inuktitut and Mushroom 11 [2015] is available in Inuktitut and Algonquin.

Obsidian's expansion for Fallout: New Vegas, Honest Hearts, features tribals living in Zion National Park who have developed a language that is a fusion of English, German, and Navajo.

== Academic studies ==
Research of Indigenous video games, ranging from representations to design and development, are on the rise. In 2017, Indigenous Studies journal Transmotion devoted a special issue to such research.

Scholars vary in their fields, methods, and topics. Dean Mahuta (Māori) studies games in which Māori represent themselves. Outi Laiti (Sámi) does similar work for Sámi representations while also participating in game jams as interventions. Researchers including Deborah Madsen and Michelle Lee Brown have analyzed design in Indigenous games from an Indigenous lens. Elizabeth LaPensée looks at design and development processes as a designer, reinforced by work by Gabriel de los Angeles, Jeanette Bushnell, Jonathan Tomhave, and Maize Longboat.

Player-oriented research seeks to understand how Indigenous games are received, both by wider audiences as well as Indigenous players. Related, Jakub Majewski's research examines how Australian Aboriginal gamers portray themselves through role-playing games, while Naithan Lagace studies how Indigenous representations in commercial games affect Indigenous players.

Further research discusses copyright, protection of Indigenous knowledge, and appropriate portrayal of Indigenous cultures in regards to video games.

== See also ==
- Race and video games
- Indigenous Futurisms
- List of Native American video game characters
