= Castle Strike =

2004 strategy video game

- Developer(s): Related Designs
- Publisher(s): Data Becker; Witt Interactive Studios
- Platform(s): Windows
- Release: DE: January 07, 2004; NA: October 12, 2004
- Genre(s): Strategy
- Mode(s): Single player, Multiplayer

Castle Strike is a 2004 real-time strategy video game developed by Related Designs.

== Gameplay ==
Castle Strike takes place during medieval times but with few fantastical elements. There is a campaign, skirmish and multiplayer option, the multiplayer is hosted by GameSpy. There are three playable nations in the game, those being England, France and Germany.

== Synopsis ==
The game takes place during the Hundred Years' War. The first and second campaigns focus respectively on Thorwald Von Rabenhorst and his sister, Svea. The third and last campaign centers around the French paladin Thibaut De Chatnois.

== Reception ==
Reception

Review scores
Publication	Score
4Players	81%
GameStar	80%
Jeuxvideo.com	16/20
Gamekult	6/10
Igromania	6.5/10
Pelit	65%

== See also ==
- No Man's Land
