= Prey (2017 video game) =

2017 video game

- Developer: Arkane Austin
- Publisher: Bethesda Softworks
- Director: Raphaël Colantonio
- Producer: Susan Kath
- Designer: Ricardo Bare
- Programmer: Stevan Hird
- Writers: Ricardo Bare; Raphaël Colantonio; Chris Avellone
- Composer: Mick Gordon
- Engine: CryEngine
- Platforms: PlayStation 4; Windows; Xbox One
- Release: May 5, 2017
- Genre: First-person shooter
- Modes: Single-player, multiplayer (Note: Only available in the Typhon Hunter update for the Mooncrash expansion.)

Prey is a 2017 first-person shooter immersive sim video game developed by Arkane Austin and published by Bethesda Softworks. It occurs in an alternate timeline in which mankind has taken to orbital stations following an accelerated Space Race. The player plays as Morgan Yu, a member of a scientific team aboard the space station Talos I researching the Typhon, a hostile alien force with both physical and psychic powers. As the Typhon escapes confinement, the player uses various weapons and abilities to survive, progressing to end the alien outbreak and ultimately escape Talos I. The player gradually gains access to areas of Talos I through linear mission progression until they can explore the station freely, acquiring key items and abilities along the way.

Development of the game started after Arkane Austin completed its work on Dishonored (2012). Raphaël Colantonio served as the title's director. Arkane's Prey is largely unrelated to the 2006 game Prey or its cancelled sequel. It did not use any of the planned sequel's assets and only incorporated the previous game's name and the broad theme of the protagonist being hunted by aliens. Arkane built Prey as a spiritual successor to System Shock (1994), giving players multiple avenues to approach and tackle missions while considering the Talos I station a thematic reinterpretation of the underground dungeon from their debut game, Arx Fatalis (2002). The game combines elements of first-person shooters, role-playing video games, stealth games, and Metroidvanias in its design. Aliens in the game were designed to be enigmatic, with their design being inspired by paranormal elements rather than stereotypical insect- or lizard-like species.

The game was released for PlayStation 4, Windows, and Xbox One on May 5, 2017. It received positive reviews from critics, who praised the game's setting, level design, environmental storytelling, and themes, though its main story and gameplay received a mixed response. The game's reputation improved over time. Retrospectives from several gaming publications described it as one of the best immersive sims ever made. Arkane released an expansion named Mooncrash, which adds procedural generation and gameplay elements found in roguelike games. Arkane also introduced a multiplayer update named Typhon Hunter, which incorporates the Typhon shapeshifting abilities in a hide-and-seek-style game. The game's disappointing commercial performance resulted in Arkane Austin pivoting to making live service games such as Redfall (2023).

== Gameplay ==
Players can use the Gloo Cannon to freeze Mimics, stopping them from moving and transforming into daily life objects.

Prey is an immersive sim played from a first-person perspective. The player plays as Morgan Yu, a human who must find a way to escape a space station following its takeover by a hostile alien race named the Typhon. At the beginning of the game, the player is only equipped with a basic wrench as their weapon, though they eventually unlock a Gloo Cannon, which shoots out a foam-like substance that can freeze enemies in place. The game features a number of firearms, such as a silenced pistol, a shotgun, and a boltcaster. Players can also take advantage of environmental hazards, such as oil spills and explosive canisters, as well as station defenses such as turrets, to defeat Typhons. Some movement, such as swinging a melee weapon and sprinting, consumes stamina, which gradually regenerates when the player is resting. Ammo in the game is scarce, and players can make use of stealth tactics to silently bypass enemies or chart alternate paths to avoid them entirely.

There are many subspecies of Typhon in the game, each with a unique attack pattern: the Cystoids rush to players and explode; the Mimics shapeshift into common items to disguise themselves; the Poltergeists can turn themselves invisible; and the Telepaths can unleash devastating psychic energy attacks. Phantoms are human corpses taken over by the Typhon, and the power they wield is randomly generated. Throughout the game, the player will also encounter a singular enemy named the Nightmare, who serves as a powerful opponent that constantly hunts and stalks the player. Their psionic attacks can be nullified using throwables, rendering them vulnerable. Alien attacks depletes Morgan's health and suit integrity, though they can be healed by consuming food or utilizing a health kit. A post-launch update introduced a "Survival" mode, which introduced weapon degradation, and "traumas" that further hinder the player's combat performance.

Rather than having separate levels or missions, the station setting of Talos I is completely continuous. The Gloo Cannon releases a foam-like substance that can be attached to walls and platforms, creating makeshift stairs that can be used to access distant locations. Areas in the game are interconnected, and there are often multiple ways to access a location or approach an objective. At times, the game requires the player to return to areas they previously explored, though new skills unlocked may allow them to enter previously inaccessible areas. The player can venture outside Talos I into space and find shortcuts connecting parts of the station. Through exploration, they can discover optional objectives, as well as items such as maps that aid navigation, key codes used to unlock additional rooms, and blueprints necessary for crafting new weapons and ammo. Prey has multiple endings, falling into three major narrative structures depending on how the player broadly interacted with the station and surviving humans. Various items can be collected for use later, though Morgan only has a limited carrying capacity. Useful items can also be looted from corpses of fallen crew members. Recyclers can be found across Talos I, turning useless items into raw materials, which can then be used in fabricators to craft weapons, ammo, and consumables.

A device named a Psychoscope can be used to scan the environment and detect the location of Typhons. As they explore, the player can collect an item called a Neuromod and eventually gain an ability to make them at a fabricator. These Neuromods are used to upgrade the player's ability through a skill tree system. It includes human abilities such as hacking and passive skills such as increased damage and improved health, as well as alien powers that enable Morgan to perform feats such as lifting enemies, creating a psychic explosion, teleporting short distances, mimicking matter, and taking over an enemy's mind. These powers have a short cooldown time, as governed by a Psi meter. Injecting themselves with too many alien Neuromods will result in Nightmare detecting the player's location and the station defense attacking them since it began identifying them as an alien. Weapons in the game can also be upgraded to improve their performance, and Chipsets can be equipped on Morgan's suit and Psychoscope to further increase their attributes. As an immersive sim, the game supports a variety of playstyles, and gameplay systems interlock. For instance, the bolts of the boltcaster can interact with the touch screen of terminals, skills can be chained together to create devastating damage, and mimicking a robot will allow players to essentially fly and explore the station.

=== Expansions ===
The Mooncrash expansion is a roguelike experience in which, while the layout of the station remain the same, the placement of enemies, weapons, and other items is randomized on each playthrough. Narratively, the player takes the role of a hacker running simulations to investigate what happened to the five survivors of the Pytheas Moonbase. In the expansion, the player must navigate each character through the station, fighting off the Typhon, collecting equipment, hacking terminals, and ultimately reaching an escape point unique to that character. The state of the station is randomized at the beginning of a run and does not reset between characters; completing a run requires escaping with all characters without dying or resetting.. Players may reset the simulation, randomizing the world elements and effectively starting a new run. However, the player gains points that they can use within the simulation to improve how any of the characters start, such as with better weapons or additional health packs, and they can permanently unlock skills for each character within future simulation runs by collecting certain objects. As players spend more time in each run, the difficulty of gameplay increases.

The Typhon Hunter expansion contains two game modes. One is designed as a single-player virtual reality experience known as Transtar VR, challenging the player to various escape room scenarios aboard the Talos I station. The second is an asymmetrical multiplayer mode for up to six players. One plays as Morgan while the others are Mimic Typhons, which can disguise themselves as nearly any object within the environment. The player as Morgan is challenged to find and kill all the other players within a limited amount of time, while the Mimic players can rearrange items in rooms, disguise themselves, and when the Morgan player is close, jump out and attack them before seeking another hiding place.

== Plot ==
=== Setting ===
Prey takes place in an alternate timeline where the Soviet Union encounters a species of eusocial aliens called the Typhon aboard their satellite Vorona 1 in 1958. The Soviet Union works together with the United States to fight off and capture the aliens, unbeknownst to the general population. Together, they build the space station Kletka, (Note: Russian: Клетка lit. 'Cell') situated in orbit around the Moon, to be used as a prison for the Typhon. After a failed assassination attempt on United States President John F. Kennedy, the United States wrests full control of the Kletka satellite from the Soviet Union. Research of the Typhon continues under the name "Project Axiom". After the 1980 "Pobeg Incident", which resulted in the Typhon killing some scientists aboard the station, the American government shut down Project Axiom but left the captive Typhon alive.

In 2025, the newly founded TranStar Corporation acquires Kletka and, by 2030, refits it as Talos I, a fully operational research laboratory to study the Typhon and create advances in neuroscience. This leads to the creation of Neuromods that harness the Typhon's physiology to restructure the human brain and grant the user new abilities, including superhuman ones. TranStar grows financially successful from sales of Neuromods on Earth. At the time of the setting, about 2035, TranStar has further expanded the station to make for suitable living quarters for its staff, which spends up to two years on the station between regular shuttles to Earth.

=== Synopsis ===
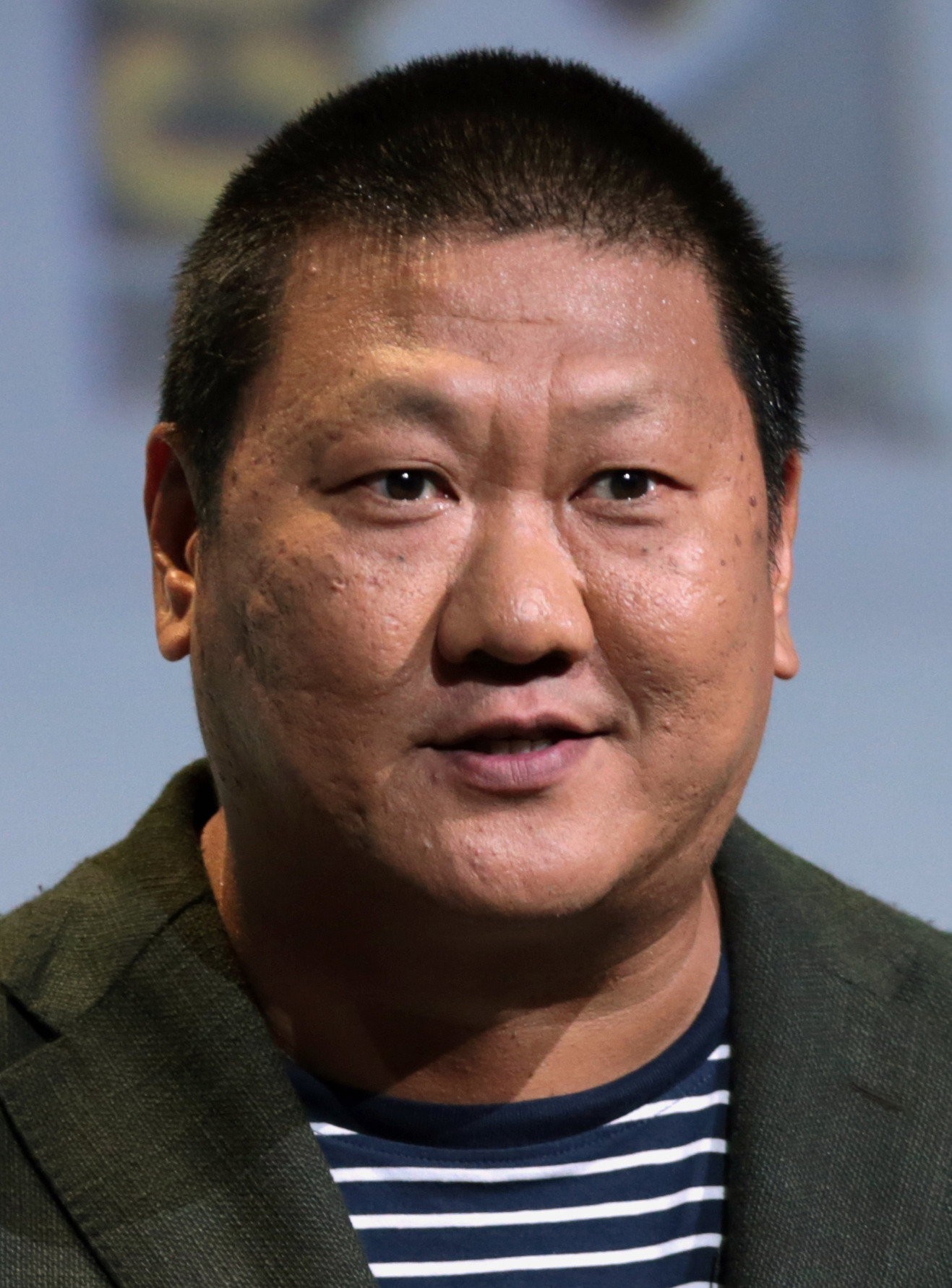
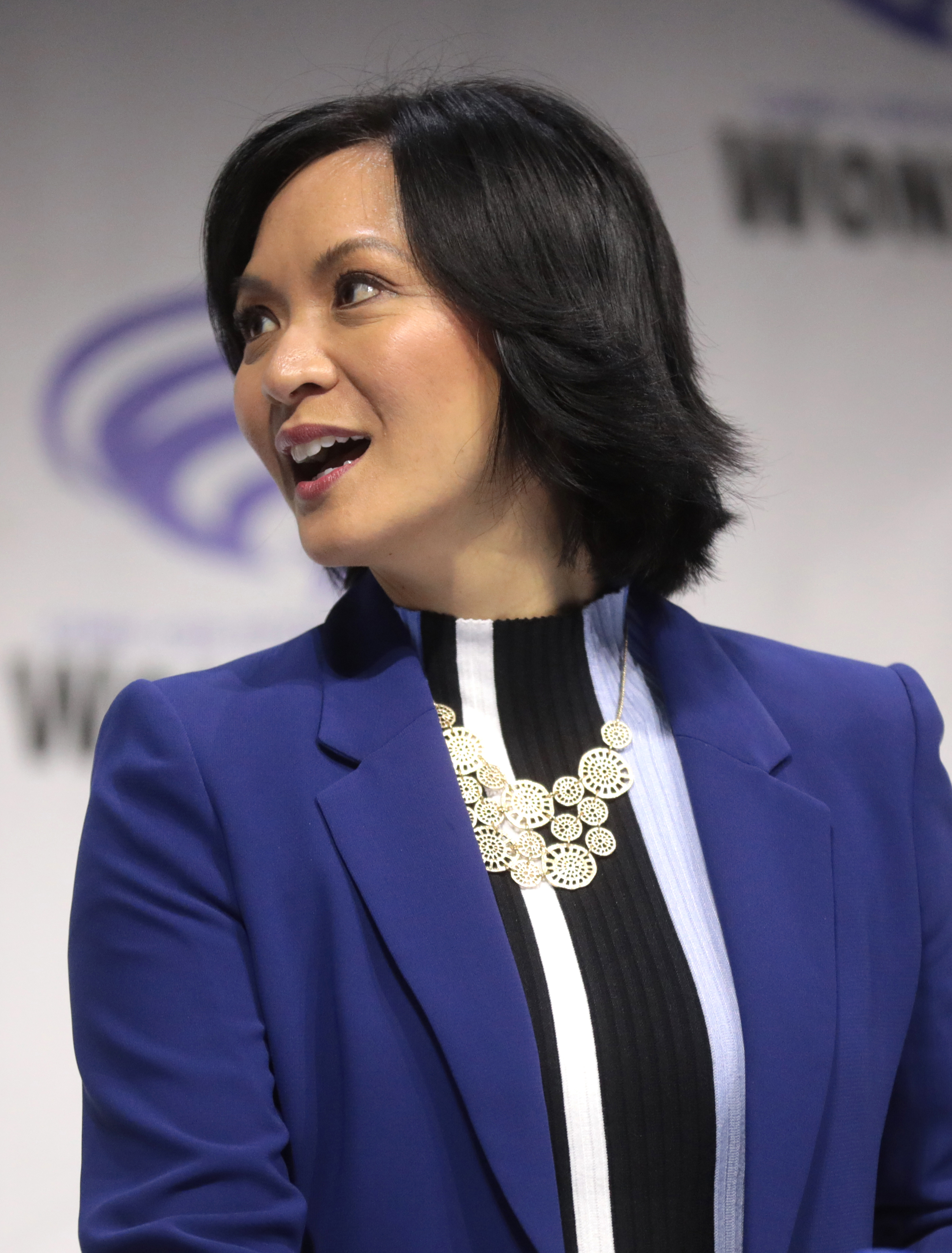
Benedict Wong (left) and Sumalee Montano (right) played Alex Yu and the female version of Morgan Yu in Prey.

In March 2032, Morgan Yu (male voiced by Tim Kang, female voiced by Sumalee Montano) is recruited by their brother Alex (Benedict Wong) to join TranStar's research team on Talos I. Before leaving for the station, Morgan takes a series of tests. One of the supervising doctors is attacked by a Typhon during the testing process, and Morgan is knocked out.

In 2035, Morgan wakes up in their apartment and finds that it is a simulated environment; they have been living on Talos I for three years. Morgan is contacted by January (voiced by Kang or Montano, depending on the player's chosen gender), an Operator artificial intelligence that claims to have been built by Morgan. January warns Morgan that the Typhon have broken containment and taken over the station, killing much of the crew. It reveals to Morgan that it and Morgan had been testing Neuromods for the past three years. While they allow for instantaneous learning of complex skills and abilities, a side effect of removing them is that the user loses all memories gained after their installation, explaining Morgan's memory loss. January claims that Morgan built it to help destroy Talos I, taking the Typhon and all its research with it. Alex contacts Morgan and suggests instead building a special Nullwave device to destroy the Typhon but leave the station intact, citing that their research is too valuable to lose.

Morgan travels through the station and encounters other survivors, with players given a choice to help them or not. Alex tasks Morgan with scanning the Typhon "Coral" growing around the station and discovers that the Typhon are building a sort of neural network. Their attempts to study the neural network are interrupted when the TranStar Board of Directors learns of the containment breach and sends a cleanup crew to eliminate both the Typhon and any surviving station crew; after the cleanup crew is dealt with, Alex further analyzes the data and concludes that the Typhon are sending a signal into deep space to summon something. A gargantuan Typhon called the Apex appears and begins to devour Talos I. Morgan is given the choice to activate the station's self-destruct sequence or build the Nullwave device to defeat the Typhon.

If Morgan chooses to activate the Nullwave device, all the Typhon on Talos I are destroyed and the station is left intact. If Morgan chooses to activate the self-destruct, the entire station explodes, destroying all the Typhon with it. Morgan either finds a way to escape the station or is stranded and dies in the explosion, based on earlier choices in the game. In a post-credits scene, Morgan wakes up in a lab and learns that it is not the real Morgan but instead a captured Typhon implanted with Morgan's memories in an effort to teach it human emotions and empathy. The Typhon have invaded Earth; Alex and his Operator assistants judge "Morgan" based on the choices it makes throughout the game. If "Morgan" fails to show human empathy, Alex destroys it and restarts the experiment. If "Morgan" did show human empathy, Alex lets it go, whereupon it can choose to accept his offer to bring peace between the Typhon and humanity or kill him.

==== Mooncrash ====
In 2036, Peter is stationed in a remote satellite orbiting the Moon and is forced under contract by the Kasma Corporation, a rival to TranStar, to undergo numerous simulations reliving a Typhon outbreak on TranStar's Pytheas Moon Base. As he completes his assigned tasks, his handler, Basilisk, warns him that Kasma will betray him once his mission is complete and helps him prepare to escape. When Peter fulfills his contract, Kasma congratulates him but claims that due to tight budgets, they cannot retrieve him from the satellite and shut off his life support. With help from Basilisk, Peter overrides the satellite's controls and crashes it near the real Pytheas facility, where he commandeers a shuttle and returns to Earth. In a post-credits scene, it is revealed that a Mimic has stowed away on Peter's shuttle.

== Development ==
=== Origin ===
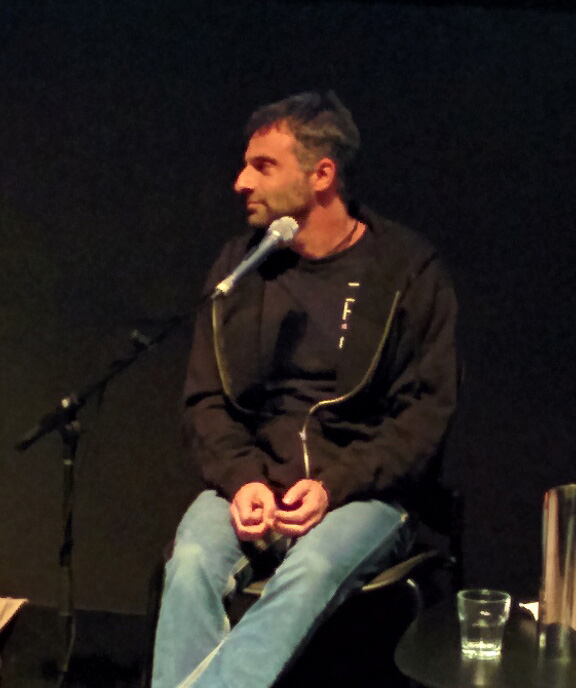
The game was directed by Arkane's CEO Raphaël Colantonio.

The success of the original Prey led to the announcement of Prey 2 in August 2006, with continued development by 3D Realms. However, the project faced numerous issues, including the transfer of the intellectual property (IP) rights to Bethesda Softworks (under ZeniMax Media) and a change of developer to Human Head Studios in 2011. Meanwhile, after completing work on Dishonored, Arkane Studios split their team to work on two projects: Dishonored 2 and a new intellectual property based on similar gameplay ideas. This new science fiction-themed game would be "in first-person, with depth and simulation and narration". Development was led by Arkane Studios CEO and director Raphaël Colantonio and his team in Austin, Texas.

After Human Head's game was cancelled in 2014, Arkane was mandated by publisher and parent company Bethesda Softworks to use the title Prey as the name of the game. At the time, the team described it as a "re-imagining of the IP", with no relation to either the original game or Prey 2 outside of the player-facing aliens. Colantonio said in later interviews that calling their game Prey was a decision that no one on the Arkane team was pleased with. They reportedly wanted their game to stand on its own as a unique IP but were overruled by corporate decisions at Bethesda, with Colantonio adding that the naming decision was "gross" and "disrespectful" to both his team and the creators of the original game.

=== Gameplay design ===
Prey's world design follows in the footsteps of games such as System Shock and Arkane's own Arx Fatalis. Colantonio described Prey as an "open structure" game in which the entire game is a long, self-contained mission where players can return to the same area repeatedly. The team followed the "mega-dungeon" concept of Arx Fatalis but set it in a space station filled with hostile aliens. Players were required to consider the "full ecology" of the game world to overcome obstacles that gate their progress, ranging from overpowered enemy encounters to the station's collapsing infrastructure. They did not want the player to solve singular-solution puzzles, such as simply finding a key for a locked door, but instead to use the game's full suite of tools to overcome an interconnected environment that was challenging for exploration. The team described Talos I as a "living, dynamic world" that provided many viable solutions to the same problem. Metroidvania games were also a key influence on gameplay design. Designer Ricardo Bare described the space station as a "skyscraper floating in space". As a corporate experimental facility, it was designed to be functional and believable, with all the rooms and utilities required by a fully staffed location. Climbable ladders were one of the transversal mechanics that the team actively avoided in Prey. Bare added that designing freeform gameplay was "tricky" as players may appear in any part of the station regardless of progress. Since the game did not limit players' action, fixing bugs was stated to be the team's biggest technical challenge.

Prey incorporates numerous gameplay concepts from Dishonored, where players are encouraged to find creative solutions to overcome obstacles. Borrowed elements from Dishonored include giving the player enough agency to determine how they want to proceed, developing a game world based on pre-established lore that can be learned by examining notes and computer terminals throughout the station, and a simple user interface. However, Colantonio said that Prey was less focused on stealth than Dishonored and provided a more role-playing video game-style improvement system through in-game chipsets that allow the player to customize their abilities. The developers also took inspiration from FTL: Faster Than Light, considering the complexities of the various gameplay systems and the speed at which a situation can go wrong if the player did not sufficiently plan; Bare said they wanted to include that "chaos of systems", in which failing station systems and the decaying infrastructure of Talos I created environmental hazards that can be both an aid to the players in defeating the Typhon or a cause of unforeseen consequences if the player is not careful. Arkane had considered including procedural generation within the main campaign so that different areas may have different hazards when encountered. However, as they believed it would frustrate players and cause them to skip content, they dropped this approach for Prey and worked it into Mooncrash instead.

Emergent gameplay was a goal of Arkane: while they had given the players abilities to take on Prey in a full action mode or full stealth mode, they wanted players to find a way to complete the game in their own manner, improvising using the game's various systems. They avoided including enemies or obstacles that would be impossible to surpass because a player did not specialize in the right skills and provided a means to bypass such areas. One of the Typhon aliens, the Mimic, was inspired by the creature of the same name from Dungeons & Dragons and was programmed to take the form of any object smaller than itself in the room without the use of scripted events, instead allowing the alien's artificial intelligence to decide what to replicate. The Psychoscope, which allows players to scan an alien to learn and use its powers, also created new but unexpected gameplay options, such as taking the form of a small object to sneak into small places or taking the form of a non-flammable object to roll through fire-laden areas. Inspired by Dishonored, Prey had in-game consequences of both an emotional and a mechanical nature for certain player actions. How the player interacts with its cast of non-playable characters may alter its ending, and using too many Typhon upgrades may result in gameplay alterations.

Arkane recognized that as a research station, Talos I's security forces would likely only have common weapons, such as pistols and shotguns, and advanced weapons were designed to look like flawed prototypes only in their testing phases. Their design was inspired by Stanley Greenberg's Time Machine, a book featuring photographs of stylized experimental prototypes, and drew from a CERN database detailing their experiments from the 1960s and 70s. While direct confrontations with enemies are an option, many of the tools in Prey allow players to take advantage of enemies, disabling them before striking. One of the weapons, the Gloo Cannon, allowed players to freeze enemies in place and create makeshift platforms for exploration. As the moon station setting provided a clear boundary, the team felt that players should be allowed to move through this space freely and fluidly. This created pressure for the art team, who had to ensure that every corner of the game was well-designed. An early mechanic allowed players to directly fly through the space station; it was scrapped. Due to technical constraints of the game's console versions, gloo must always attach to an object in the game's world.

=== Story and narrative ===
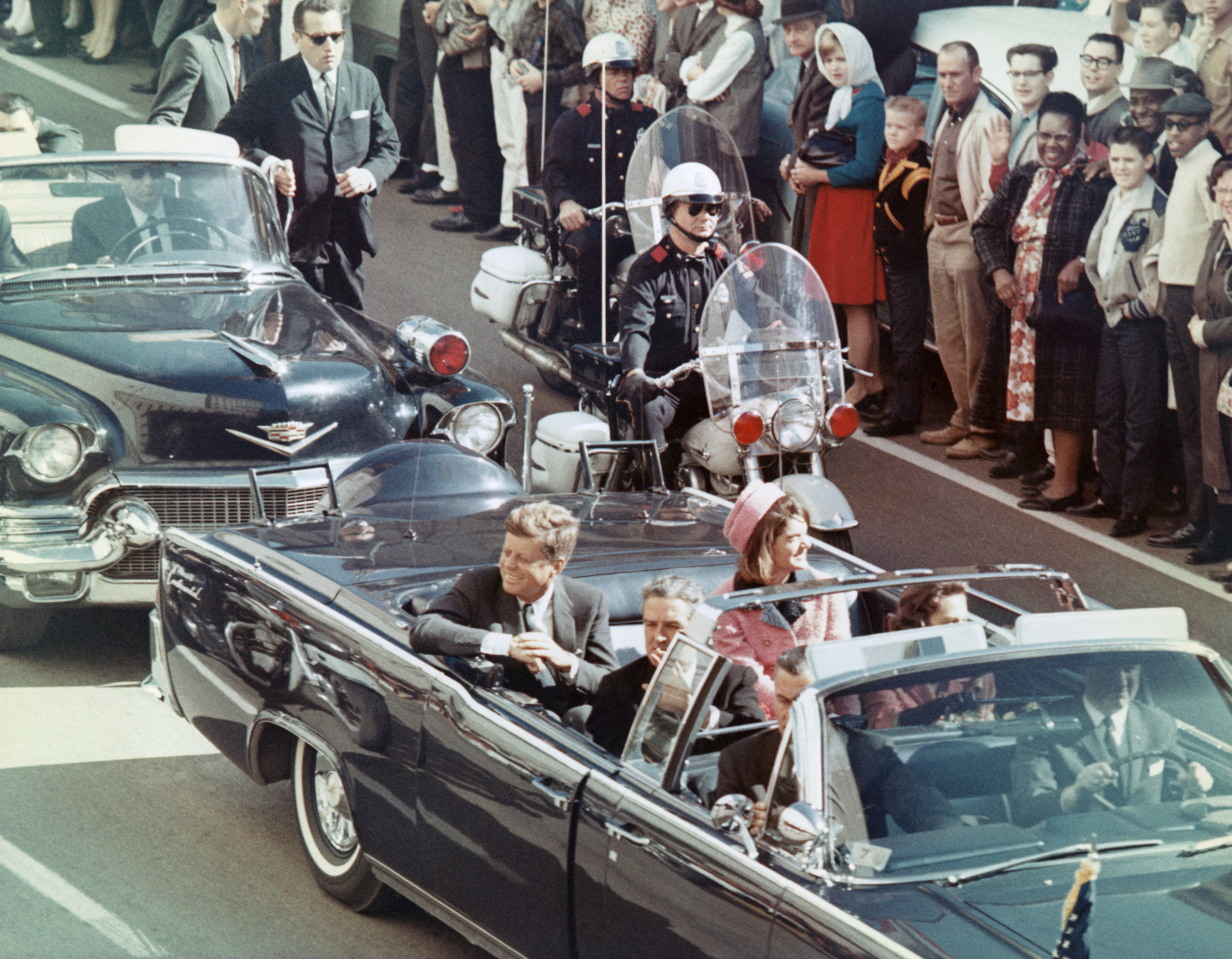
One of the points of divergence in Prey's parallel universe is the failed assassination of John F. Kennedy.

According to design documents from the project's early history, the game was developed at Arkane under the name "Project Danielle", a title that paid homage to SHODAN from System Shock. Three different concepts were presented, all based on the nature of System Shock and involving the player-character, Danielle Sho, discovering the false reality in their apparent world and interacting with an artificial intelligence with significant influence on events; settings included a futuristic lab set on Earth, a secret lab on a remote island, and a retro-futuristic setting. The opening sequence, which serves as a fake tutorial and sees Morgan discovering their life as a simulation, was created by the team to set the tone for the game and establish a feeling of distrust within players. Arkane restricted the number of horror elements they included, since they could not predict the path of the player or where the player's attention would be. Instead, Colantonio described the game as a "psychological thriller".

The narrative concept for Prey came to Colantonio on a flight while traveling. Colantonio said that it took about a year from this initial concept to come up with an alternate timeline that helped support this detailing. They considered how the future would have been different if John F. Kennedy survived the assassination attempt, allowing them to flesh out the narrative and design of the space station. As Talos I is a relatively small space, Arkane was able to detail the station in-depth to make the world more cohesive, such as naming and fleshing out background stories for each non-player character (NPC), including those already dead when the story begins. As with other immersive sims, the game placed a large emphasis on environmental storytelling, making extensive use of books, notes, and audio logs to provide additional information regarding the setting and the lore. Bare added that these storytelling efforts were essential for players to understand the location better, though the team accepted that not all players will discover them due to their optional nature. Bare added that by giving the player a choice to examine or completely ignore them, Talos I became a setting that felt more "real". As the game was largely nonlinear, the discovery of this optional content also became individualized, creating a story that felt personal. To keep the game immersive, the game rarely took players out of gameplay and had a minimal amount of non-interactive cutscenes.

Austin Grossman, also of Arkane, helped establish early plot details. Bare reached out to Chris Avellone in around 2013 for help with the story, and Avellone worked with Arkane on the story from June to about November 2016. Avellone also contributed to designing several NPCs and the various missions that involved them. He felt these characters and their missions created dilemmas for the player, helping the player define their version of Morgan as well as expanding on the game universe. Among other works, Prey was influenced by the films Moon, Starship Troopers, and The Matrix. As part of promotional efforts, Bethesda partnered with the Alamo Drafthouse to show these three films in April 2017. Avellone also cited Aliens as part of his inspiration, describing it as an action-suspense film that has moments of comedy, even amid heavy action sequences, something he reused in Prey. Sunshine, Total Recall, and Lovecraftian fiction also influenced the game.

=== Art design ===
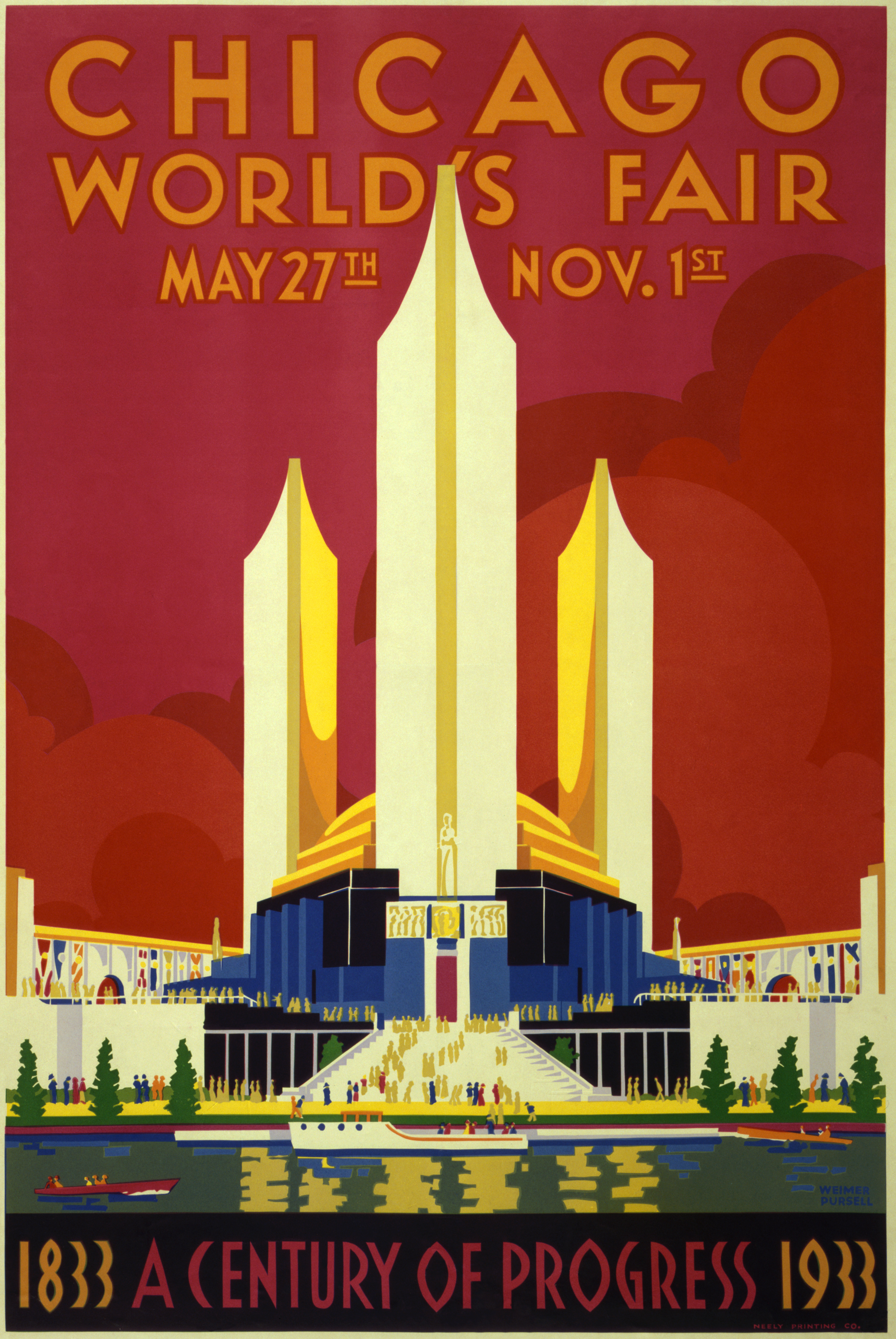
The art direction of the game was inspired by Art Deco.

The styles used in the various parts of the station were directly attributed to the alternate history fiction itself, with the team considering what architecture would have influenced those most responsible for operating Talos I at the time. This ranged from considering the visual motifs during the Kennedy era to envisioning how those funding contemporary commercial space efforts, like Elon Musk or Google, would style a space station. Because of the numerous agencies that operated and expanded Talos I over the decades, the station includes a large mix of architectural designs, ranging from retrofuturism that was popular in 1960s America to brutalist styles that were common in the Soviet Bloc in the mid-20th century to opulent Art Deco put in place by the wealthy TranStar executives. Artist Sébastien Mitton described the game's art style as "Neo Deco", which merged futuristic elements into aesthetics of the mid-20th century. The team was also influenced by the works of architect Hugh Ferriss, painter John Berkey, the design of NASA's early spacecraft, the Viceroy hotel in New York, and unrealized projects such as South Ferry Plaza. The entrance Lobby of Talos I was the first location created, and its furnishing and interior design were influenced by the works of Frank Lloyd Wright and Wilhelm Wagenfeld, while the technology in the game was inspired by that created by IBM and consumer electronic designer Jacob Jensen. The team also created a lot of TranStar posters and decorations and placed them all over Talos I, as they were inspired by Ansgar Oswald's book "Offices Construction and Design Manual" which documented how corporate identity "permeates the workplace".

Arkane's Harvey Smith is credited with establishing the Typhon and the reason for their existence in the story. Arkane wanted a more unique design for the aliens and opted to use designs inspired by paranormal elements rather than stereotypical insect- or lizard-like species. Colantonio wanted the monsters in the game to be black in color, and the team came up with designs that were "visually undefined, mysterious, blurry" whose complexities were entirely reflected through their silhouettes. They were inspired by time-lapse photography of people in motion, particularly the Metamorphosis series by Frederic Fontenoy. Additional particle effects and blurry animated shaders were added to these monsters to make them look more enigmatic. The animation team was inspired by the movement of real-life animals, such as praying mantises, octopuses, and squids. The Typhons in the game had their own ecology. For instance, Mimics served as scouts for the Typhon and can combine together to form another enemy variant named Weaver. The Nightmare, a powerful Typhon that shows up regularly to hunt the player, was inspired by the Alien from Alien: Isolation.

The original score was composed and produced by Mick Gordon, who had previously composed the soundtrack for Doom (2016). Additional music was composed by Ben Crossbones, Matt Piersall, and Colantonio, with each one providing a single track. The soundtrack was released for live-streaming music services a week before the game's release.

== Release and marketing ==
Bethesda announced Prey during its press conference at E3 2016. The game was released on May 5, 2017. Players who pre-ordered the game received the "Cosmonaut Shotgun Pack", which offered several in-game weapons and consumables for players to use. Just prior to release, No Matter Studios, the developers of Prey for the Gods, announced that they had to change the name of their game to Praey for the Gods due to trademark objections from ZeniMax Media. ZeniMax reported that they had to defend the Prey trademark to avoid losing it by taking objection to No Matter's trademark filing. Arkane and Bethesda provided a game demo for PlayStation 4 and Xbox One consoles about a week before the launch, covering about the first hour of gameplay. The studio did not opt to provide a demo for Windows systems, citing that they had to choose between either the consoles or personal computers for demo release. Colantonio said that with the release through Steam, interested players can try the game for up to two hours under Steam's return policy, effectively treating this as the equivalent of a demo. The Steam version eventually received a demo in August 2017, which included roughly the first hour of gameplay.

=== Expansions ===
During E3 2018, Bethesda announced and released a free update that added two new game modes to Prey, including a New Game Plus mode and a Survival mode that adds modifiers, such as weapon durability, that make it more difficult. The first paid expansion, Mooncrash, was also released on the same day. Roguelike elements were added to the game, as the team wanted to evolve the immersive sim formula while preserving the core gameplay of Prey. Realizing that most players will not fully explore the entire space station due to the main game's linear plot structure, Mooncrash was designed to be a shorter game meant to be replayed many times. It adopted a more open-ended narrative, and each character starts and ends at a different location of the moon station, so players will explore the same station using various routes. The expansion was further updated in September 2018 with a free patch that provided in-game customization skins that celebrated the team's favorite roguelike games, which included Spelunky, Rogue Legacy, Risk of Rain, Don't Starve, Darkest Dungeon, and Dead Cells.

The Typhon Hunt mode was inspired by the "Prop Hunt" mode that came about from Garry's Mod; as Arkane started to show initial details of the main game, including the Mimic enemies, players responded that they were reminded of "Prop Hunt". Bare had not been aware of what that was, but after researching it, felt it was ideal for a multiplayer extension of Prey. The Typhon Hunt mode was released on December 11, 2018, along with a virtual reality-based escape-the-room set of puzzles set before the events of Prey. Both modes were released as free additions to Mooncrash. Both Mooncrash and Typhon Hunt were modes prototyped within an internal game jam following the release of Prey, looking to see how they could easily extend the game.

== Reception ==
=== Critical reception ===
Reception

Aggregate score
Aggregator	Score
Metacritic	(PC) 82/100 (PS4) 79/100 (XONE) 84/100

Review scores
Publication	Score
Game Informer	8.25/10
GameSpot	6/10
GamesRadar+	4.5/5
IGN	8/10
PC Gamer (US)	79/100
Polygon	8.5/10
The Guardian	3/5

Prey received "generally favorable" reviews from critics, according to review aggregator Metacritic. Several critics recognized Prey as one of the year's best games. It was nominated for "Best Storytelling" at the Golden Joystick Awards, "Best Action Game" at The Game Awards, and "Excellence in Narrative" at the SXSW Gaming Awards.

Dan Stepleton from IGN described the setting as "sophisticated", adding that the game's open structure provided many alternative pathways for players to reach their objective. He remarked that despite needing to revisit locations to complete quests, it did not become repetitive, as new skills are unlocked to aid exploration. Phil Savage from PC Gamer wrote that the location felt "natural", praising its realistic environmental design and room layout that is rooted in utility. Critics generally enjoyed Arkane's level design, praising their efforts in designing a complex layout for the space station and ensuring that each location has multiple points of access, some of which can be reached through unconventional ways. Tina Amini from Mashable described the station as a "maze" and liked how players need to take time to master its layout. Javy Gwaltney from Game Informer praised Prey for its "sense of wonder", and Tamoor Hussain from GameSpot described the game as visually striking, though they both felt that the station was not visually diverse enough. Critics applauded its environmental storytelling and side quests, which follow the crews of Talos I and their struggles.

GamesRadar' Zoe Delahunty-Light liked the incorporation of alien powers, though she felt that the human skills were underdeveloped comparatively. Gwaltney praised the game's enemy variety and described them as "unnerving". He praised its immersive sim elements, writing that the interlocking systems, despite being complicated, created memorable yet emergent gameplay. John Walker from Rock, Paper, Shotgun praised how the game gave players freedom to use its systems. Observing the game's restraint in explaining its gameplay, he wrote that the game let players "improvise, explore, make big decisions without needing to tell you they’re big". Writing for Polygon, Arthur Gies commented that the game rewarded players for experimentation. Despite noting the game's high difficulty, he felt that it contributed to its "ominous, foreboding mood". Several reviewers criticized the early part of the game for being sluggish to play, as players had not yet unlocked the tools and upgrades necessary to make combat interesting. Stapleton remarked that combat was one of the game's weaknesses, criticizing its uninteresting weapons, and bare-bones stealth mechanics, and remarking that certain alien powers were too overpowered and enemies had too much health. Several critics disliked fighting Mimics because they were too agile, with Hussain criticizing the gunplay for not being responsive. Savage wrote that its shortcomings were a result of the game catering to a vast spectrum of playstyles, making none of its mechanics as refined as other games like BioShock or Arkane's own Dishonored.

The narrative of the game received a mixed reception. Gies enjoyed how the game built up a sense of distrust and compared Prey to Solaris, a psychological thriller. Delahunty-Light liked that all characters, even the deceased, are named, and that their stories are reflected through the audio logs and emails found in the game. Gwaltney praised the game's exploration of Yu's morality and how these moral choices affect the narrative and described Morgan's interactions with other characters as one of the game's highlights. The main quest, however, was criticized for being light in story. Stepleton and Hussain praised the game's tutorial but felt that it foreshadowed a much more interesting narrative than what the actual story ended up being. Tamoor further criticized the quests for being uninspiring and felt that both the story and its characters were not memorable. Several reviewers also criticized its pacing for being uneven and commented that the game frequently forced players to backtrack to extend its story and runtime. The game was praised by several critics and journalists for having an Asian protagonist.

PCGamesN reported that the Windows version of Prey lacked the technical problems of Dishonored 2, calling it "the best performing triple-A game" they had seen in several months. Eurogamer's Digital Foundry found the computer version of Prey to run exceedingly well across even low-end computers, in contrast to problems it saw for Dishonored 2 at release. However, some reviewers and players found that after several hours of playing on the computer version, their saved games would become corrupted, and the game would crash when transitioning between areas. Restoring from older saves would eventually cause those to be corrupted as well, making the game impossible to complete. Arkane deployed a patch to fix the problem on May 12.

The game's critical reception improved over time. Nic Reuben from Rock, Paper, Shotgun described Prey as its "masterpiece", adding that it was a smartly designed game exuberating with confidence and commending the countless gameplay possibilities provided within its systems. Cass Marshall from Polygon called the game "a testament to human imagination, and one of the best immersive sims ever made", praising its countless gameplay options and the presence of dynamic enemies such as the Nightmare for creating unique playthroughs for each player and providing replayability. Robert Jones from PC Gamer wrote that the game was a "god-tier level" immersive sim, adding that the game "evokes the feeling of playing a spiritual sequel to Half-Life 2". Writing for GamesRadar, Rick Lane felt that Prey had exceeded its inspiration (System Shock). He added that Talos I was "the single finest example of 3D level design", while praising its story for its exploration of themes such as memory and identity.

=== Sales ===
Prey debuted at No. 2 on the weekly sales charts in the United Kingdom, trailing the Nintendo Switch port of Mario Kart 8. These figures were considered disappointing due to a lack of competition from AAA new releases and the fact that the opening week sales were 60% down from Arkane's previous title, Dishonored 2. Additionally, Bethesda's decision to hold review copies until the release date was mentioned by outlets as a factor for the weak launch. Prey captured the top spot in its second week of release. In doing so, Prey became the first Bethesda game since 2016's Doom to reach number one on the United Kingdom weekly sales charts. It was the 5th best-selling game in the US in May 2017.

With both Prey and Dishonored 2 underperforming commercially, Bethesda Softworks and Arkane Studios decided to pivot their strategy from making immersive sims to live service games, resulting in the departure of Colantonio from Arkane and the release of Redfall in 2023.
