= Raphaël Colantonio =

French video game designer (born 1971)

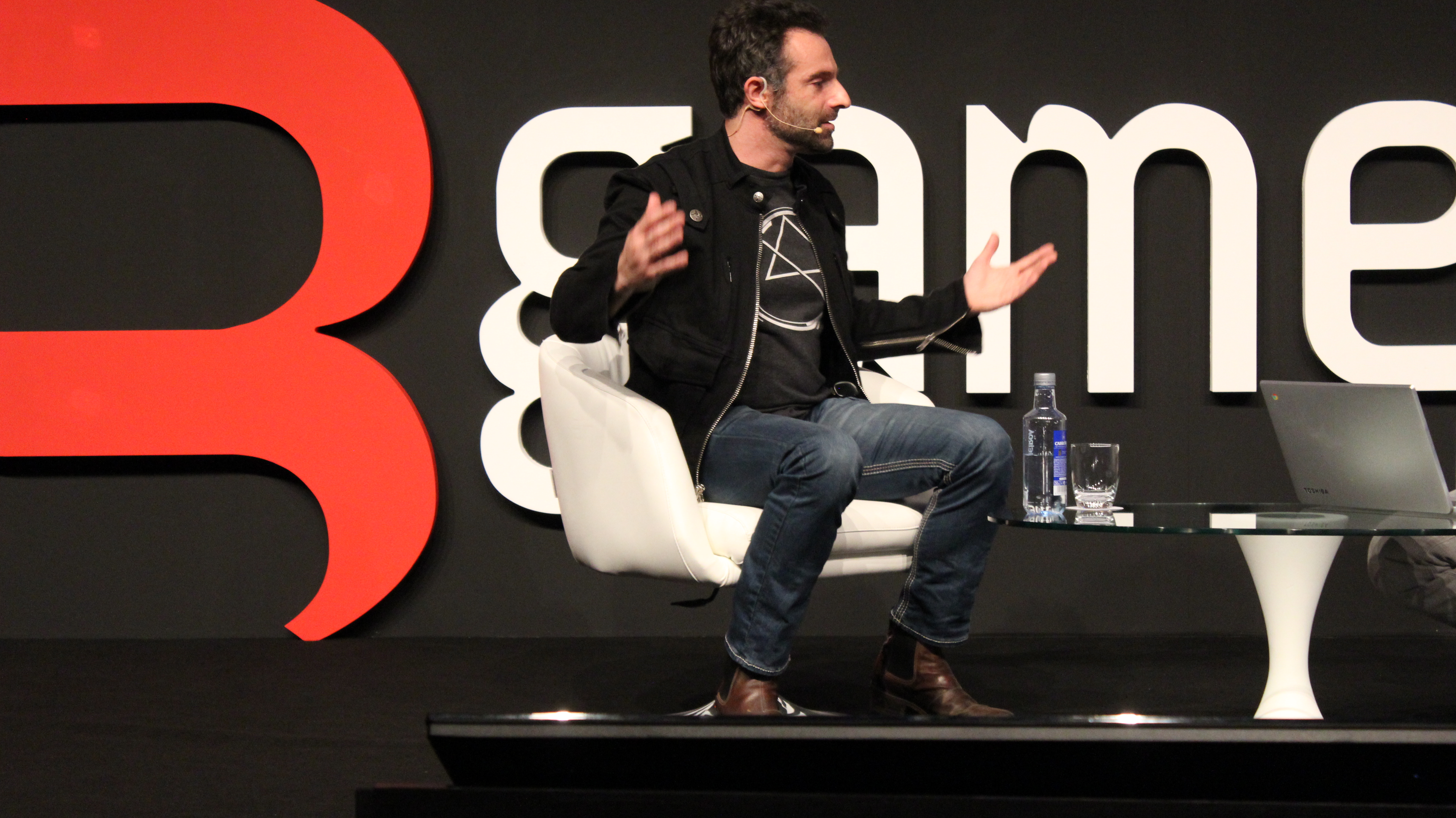
- Colantonio in 2017
- Born: 1971 (age 54–55)
- Occupation: Video game designer
- Known for: Arx Fatalis; Dark Messiah of Might and Magic; Dishonored; Prey

Raphaël Colantonio (born 1971) is a French video game designer, and was the founder and for 18 years president of Arkane Studios. He has served as creative director on several of Arkane's titles, including co-creator with Harvey Smith for the Dishonored series.

== Career ==
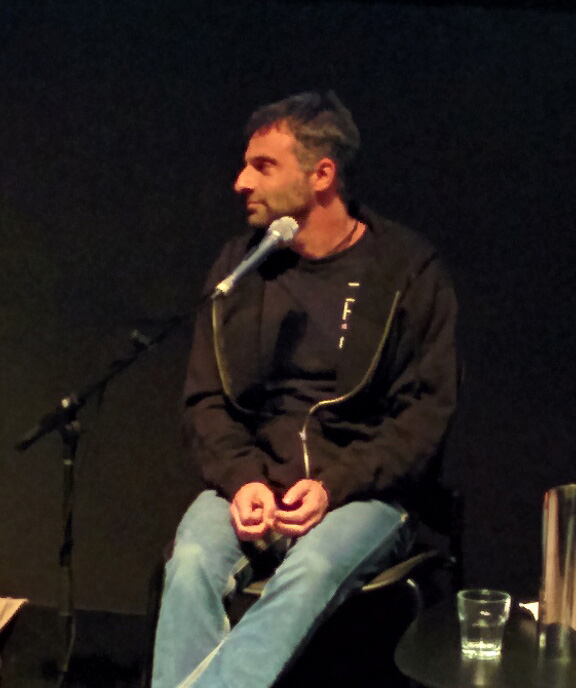
Colantonio in 2017

When Colantonio was about 18 years old, at the verge of having to perform mandatory military service that France had at the time, he participated in a contest held by Electronic Arts (EA) on knowledge about the Ultima series, which he had been a fan of. He was unaware that the contest was meant for EA to find qualified applicants for a new studio they were setting up in France, and through the contest, Colantonio was hired into EA, helping with establishing their customer support services in France.

=== Arkane Studios ===
With the introduction of home video game consoles, Colantonio saw a shift in EA to more sports-oriented games, an area he was not interested in, and left, taking a position at Infogrames for a short time. He decided around 1999 that he wanted to start his own studio, and with funding support from his uncle, he and three of his friends founded Arkane Studios in Lyon, France.

In June 2017, he departed Arkane, though he stayed with the Lyon branch of Arkane to help with transition to new management, while Harvey Smith oversaw the Austin studio. Colantonio stated that he wanted to spend more time with his son and re-evaluate his goals for the future. In a 2020 interview, he said that part of his reason for leaving was "creative anxiety" around delivering a triple A quality game where it felt like more like making a product instead, as well as wanting to take a break to focus on other matters.

=== WolfEye Studios ===
Colantonio and Julien Roby, a former producer at Arkane, announced in November 2019 they had earlier formed a new studio, WolfEye Studios, a twenty-person studio working distributively. They announced their first game, Weird West, at The Game Awards 2019, to be published by Devolver Digital. Weird West, which released on 31 March 2022, is a top-down action role-playing game with elements of the immersive sim genre in which the player takes the role of heroes in the American frontier which encounters supernatural elements, with randomized elements through each play through. Colantonio stated in March 2025 that WolfEye was working on a new, unnamed first person immersive sim title.

== Music ==
Colantonio is a musician and performs guitar, bass guitar, and vocals as one half of the Rock/Electro Goth band Weird Wolves. His music has been featured on the soundtracks of several of his video games including Dishonored 2 and Prey. After collaborating with Ava Gore on the song Realization for the Prey: Mooncrash soundtrack, the two formed Weird Wolves. The band went on to produce several tracks for the Weird West soundtrack.
