= Trevino Brings Plenty =

Lakota Sioux poet and musician

- Writing career
- Language: English, Lakota

Trevino Brings Plenty is a Lakota Sioux (Mnikȟówožu) poet and musician, who was born on the Cheyenne River Sioux reservation. He currently serves as Coordinator of Native American Student Services at Portland State University.

Scholar Karen Poremski summarizes him as being a "Lakota poet who has lived a significant portion of his life in the city of Portland, Oregon, in a post-Relocation atmosphere of people from different communities and traditions coming together to resist colonization and express Indigenous art."

In 2015, his music was featured in the Indigenous video game Invaders, a remix of Space Invaders. The music was described by scholar Deborah Madsen as "an intricate reinterpretation of the original game music within the context of survivance".

== Books ==
- Wakpá Wanáǧi, Ghost River (Backwaters Press, 2015)
- Real Indian Junk Jewelry (Backwaters Press, 2012)
- Shedding Skins: Four Sioux Poets (Michigan State University Press, 2008)
