= Weird West (video game) =

2022 video game

- Developer: WolfEye Studios
- Publisher: Devolver Digital
- Director: Raphaël Colantonio
- Designers: Christophe Carrier; Joachim Daviaud; Monte Martinez; Gaël Giraudeau
- Programmer: Borut Pfeifer
- Artists: Etienne Aubert; Emmanuel Petit
- Writers: Lucas Loredo; Erin Firestine; Elizabeth LaPensée
- Composer: Choose Hellth
- Engine: Unreal Engine 4
- Platforms: PlayStation 4; Windows; Xbox One; PlayStation 5; Xbox Series X/S
- Release: PlayStation 4, Windows, Xbox One; March 31, 2022; PlayStation 5, Xbox Series X/S; May 8, 2023
- Genre: Action role-playing
- Mode: Single-player

Weird West is an action role-playing video game developed by WolfEye Studios and published by Devolver Digital. The game was released for Windows, PlayStation 4 and Xbox One on March 31, 2022, and for PlayStation 5 and Xbox Series X/S subtitled Definitive Edition on May 8, 2023.

== Gameplay ==
Weird West is a top-down action role-playing game with elements of the immersive sim genre, with randomized elements through each playthrough. The game is based on the Weird West genre it borrows its title from, and is set in an open world environment based on the American frontier. The game features the stories of five unique characters, such as the retired bounty hunter who is forced to pick up her iron again, the pigman whose human brain was put into a body of stitched pig parts, and a Native American hunter (based on the Anishinaabe peoples). Each of the characters have their own background and story that their main quests will point to. Finishing one character's chapter will proceed the player to the next character, where the player can also find and recruit previous characters the player has played as. The world is designed to be interactive and responsive to the player's action. For instance, when the player shoots at an ammo box, it will explode. Actions done by the player in the game are permanent, meaning that they cannot be undone through respawning. The game also features a permadeath mode in which the player character and their companions will die permanently. Actual gameplay is similar to that of a twin-stick shooter, with the team describing it as "action-y version of Fallout 1 or 2".

== Development ==
Raphaël Colantonio and Julien Roby, Arkane Studios' former Executive Producer, announced in November 2019 they had earlier formed a new studio, WolfEye Studios, a twenty-person studio working distributively. They announced their first game, Weird West, at The Game Awards 2019, to be published by Devolver Digital. While the game features supernatural elements, it was not designed to be a horror game. Unlike most immersive sims, the game was not played from a first-person perspective, and instead adopted a top-down perspective that was inspired by the early Ultima and Fallout games. Chris Avellone was originally involved as a coach to the game's writing team. Since the game includes the presence of Native Americans, the team invited the Anishinaabe to ensure that their depiction in the game is authentic, and added Elizabeth LaPensée, who is Anishinaabe and Métis, to the game's writing team. Weird Wolves, a musical band established by Colantonio and Ava Gore, composed some of the game's soundtracks. The game was released on March 31, 2022 for Windows, PlayStation 4, and Xbox One.

== Cultural representation ==
Weird West includes a Native American playable character, Across Rivers, whose storyline centers on supernatural conflict, community responsibility, and the defense of Native people against outside threats. The game’s version of the American frontier draws on dark fantasy and Western genre elements, and it also seeks to include Native characters as part of the world’s social and cultural environment rather than leaving them out of the setting. Across Rivers’ chapter places Native identity at the core of the game, making Indigenous representation part of the central narrative rather than just background detail.

During development, WolfEye Studios brought Elizabeth LaPensée onto the writing team. LaPensée is an Anishinaabe and Métis game designer, writer, artist, and researcher whose work focuses on Indigenous-led media, including games and comics. In interviews, LaPensée has described her work as focused on Indigenous self-determination in media and has discussed the importance of Native creators being able to represent culture through their own creative choices rather than serving only as consultants. This is relevant to Weird West because the game includes Native American themes in a genre that has historically relied on stereotypes or erased Native perspectives.

The game’s use of the Western genre also makes its representation culturally significant. Western stories commonly focus on settlers, outlaws, lawmen, and frontier expansion, while Native peoples are often reduced to simplified roles. Weird West complicates that pattern by making a Native character one of the game’s five main protagonists. However, reviewers also noted that the game’s attempt to reimagine minorities in the historical West raised questions about how successfully it handled Native and First Nations culture, especially because Western fiction regularly carries a “white gaze.” Because of this, the game can be discussed as both an example of increased Indigenous visibility in video games and as part of a broader conversation about how Native culture is represented in popular media.

== Reception ==
Reception

Aggregate score
Aggregator	Score
Metacritic	(PC) 76/100 (PS4) 73/100 (XONE) 81/100

Review scores
Publication	Score
Destructoid	8/10
Digital Trends	3.5/5
Game Informer	8.5/10
GameSpot	6/10
GamesRadar+	4/5
Hardcore Gamer	3.5/5
IGN	8/10
PC Gamer (US)	79/100
PCGamesN	7/10
Push Square	7/10
Shacknews	8/10
VideoGamer.com	8/10

Weird West received "generally positive" reviews for PC and Xbox One and "mixed or average" reviews for PlayStation 4, according to review aggregator Metacritic.

Destructoid liked the game's compelling story, world, exploration, frantic combat, and player choice, but lamented the presence of technical issues. Game Informer gave the game an 8.5 out of 10, writing, "Weird West's best assets are its well-developed characters and deep gameplay systems, but its overall production value is underwhelming." GameSpot reviewed the title less positively, commending its writing, character dynamics, and old-school pulp fiction aesthetic, while taking issue with its inelegant combat, binary morality system, camerawork, unbalanced upgrade system, and stingy progression. GamesRadar+ similarly praised the setting and the player's freedom to create their own story while citing the finicky morality system as problematic. IGN praised the game's bizarre encounters, twists, reveals, and chaotic stealth and combat, while criticizing the dull loot and technical issues. PC Gamer praised the game's ability to react to the player's choices, but criticized its combat, writing, "When fighting does break out, it's refreshingly and mercifully quick. However, between that dingy visual style, and an overly complex twin-stick control scheme, I never found it all that enjoyable."

During the 26th Annual D.I.C.E. Awards, the Academy of Interactive Arts & Sciences nominated Weird West for "Role-Playing Game of the Year".
