= Race and video games =

The relationship between race and video games has received substantial academic and journalistic attention. Games offer opportunities for players to explore, practice, and re-enforce cultural and social identities. Because of the multifaceted cultural implications of video games, there may be issues of race involved in the player base, the creative process, or within the game's universe. Video games predominantly created and played by one racial group can unintentionally perpetuate racial stereotypes and limit players' choices to preconceived notions of racial bias, and issues of representation and harassment may arise in the industry and the player community.

== Race and gamers ==
=== Demographics of gamers ===
While research has shown the stereotypical image of a gamer to be a white male, the reality of the situation is much more diverse. Gaming's popularity among communities of color changed significantly over a short period of time: while a 2009 study found that 73.9% of white parents said their children play video games, compared to 26.1% of nonwhite parents, a 2015 result showed that 83% of black teens and 69% of Hispanic teens played video games while white teens remained at 71%.

Among adults, another 2015 study found that over half of black and Hispanic adults play video games; although only 11% of black and 19% of Hispanic adults identified as "gamers". By some calculations, people of color will be the majority of players before 2030.

=== Experiences of non-white gamers ===
Adrienne Shaw describes how the gamer identities of players intersect with identities of gender, race, and sexuality. Her research looked at the ways that identity shaped the player's own perception of whether or not they may be considered a "gamer" as its own identity and suggested that their rise in popularity among players of color is rooted in its mainstreaming, not any change in the games or development processes to attract diverse audiences.

In online play, gamers of color may experience racial harassment once identified as such, including based on voice chat. This is particularly well-documented for women of color, whose issues are compounded by their intersecting identities. A 2020 survey conducted by the Anti-Defamation League reported that over half of online gamers experienced discrimination, including at least 30% of both black and Hispanic/Latino respondents.

== Non-whites in the gaming industry ==
According to gaming convention organizer Avinelle Wing, "the industry has an even bigger problem with race than it does with gender.” A report published in 2016 by the International Game Developers Association found that people of color were both underrepresented in senior management roles as well as underpaid in comparison to white developers. The IGDA's 2021 report showed minimal improvement in diversity among employees, with three-quarters of employees in the industry identifying as white.

Many have pointed out that this lack of diversity within the industry has contributed to a lack of representation within video games themselves. Dennis Mathews, a game designer at Revelation Interaction Studios, suggests that the exclusion of non-white game developers leads to stereotyping within video game development and marketing. Developer prejudices impact who counts as a game's target audience, leading many developers to pigeonhole or ignore non-white gamers. Publishers may additionally be subject to their own biases, thereby affecting which games are funded and distributed.

The Game Developers Conference, a popular annual video game conference frequented by both industry and players, runs an "Advocacy Track" to "address new and existing issues within the realm of social advocacy. Topics covered range from diversity to censorship to quality of life." While initially started in 2013 to address issues around gender and gaming, the "Advocacy Track" features panels explicitly interested in improving diversity in gaming more broadly, including concerns around race and representation.

== Racial representations in video games ==
Through interactive gameplay, players learn about race through the types of characters that are portrayed in the virtual reality. Some scholars argue that the way racial groups are portrayed in video games may affect the way video game players perceive defining characteristics of a racial group. The presence or absence of racial groups affects how players belonging to those racial groups see themselves in terms of the development of their own identity and self-esteem. The idea of portraying different races is not something entirely new in the history of video games. Early games, including some MMORPGs like World of Warcraft, featured multiple playable (fictional) races that the player could choose from at the beginning of the game.

Compared to the research on gender stereotyping, fewer studies have examined racial stereotyping in video games.

Light skin tones are seen as the default skin color for many games. A 2015 survey found that 35% of blacks, 36% of Hispanics, and 24% of whites surveyed believe that minorities are portrayed poorly in video games.

=== Black representation ===
The portrayal of racial minorities in video games has been demonstrated to have a tendency to follow certain racial stereotypes. In a 2001 study by Children Now, 83% of African-American males were portrayed as competitors in sports-oriented games, while 86% of African-American females were either "props, bystanders, or participants in games, but never competitors." Other research from the era found similar proportions of black characters appearing in sports games. Research by Anna Everett and Craig Watkins in 2007 claimed that since then, the number of black and Latino characters has increased with the rising popularity of "urban/street games," while their portrayal remained consistently narrow, but 2009 research showed that black characters made up just over 10% of characters, primarily adhering to one of these two archetypes. In the action/shooter genre of urban/street games, both blacks and Latinos are typically portrayed as "brutally violent, casually criminal, and sexually promiscuous," while in sports, blacks are typically portrayed as "verbally aggressive and extraordinarily muscular and athletic." African Americans are represented as aggressive or athletic characters more often than as protagonists or heroes. In a study that examined the top 10 most-highly rated games for each year from 2007 to 2012, black characters represented just 3% of main protagonists, in line with Kishonna Gray's suggestion that representations of black people in sports games skew statistics and mask the lack of diversity in other games.

Adam Clayton Powell III argued that the high proportion of black male characters in sports video games have enabled (predominantly white male) gamers to practice what refers to as "high-tech blackface", which David J. Leonard describes as a digital form of minstrelsy that allows white players to effectively 'try on' blackness without being forced to acknowledge or confront the degrading racist histories surrounding minstrelsy. White players who play violent video games as a black avatar show increases in both racial bias and violent tendencies in the player, and black players have been found to self-enforce black stereotypes in game environments.

=== Hispanic and Latino representation ===
The 2001 Children Now study claimed that of the 1,716 video game characters analyzed, all Latino characters "appeared in a sports-oriented game, usually baseball." When only the most popular games were studied in 2009, less than 3% of characters were recognizably Hispanic, all non-player characters. Ross Orlando's 2012 examination concurred, finding only 1 percent of characters to be Latino. Some games' protagonists have since broken this trend, like Just Cause's Rico Rodriguez and Tom Clancy's Rainbow Six's 'Ding' Chavez, who are both Hispanic. Criticism remains that Latino characters are defined by their race, often highlighted by their accents or injected Spanish words in their dialogue, and that Latino characters adhere to classic stereotypes of male violence and female promiscuity.

=== East Asian representation ===
The potential for video games as a site for promulgating reductive, racist tropes has prompted many to point out the use of yellowface, the adoption of an East Asian character by white players, to degrade and marginalize East Asian characters in a variety of games as well. Lisa Nakamura coined the term "identity tourism" to address this phenomenon, often fetishizing East Asian women and stereotyping East Asian men as samurais or other warrior types. Anthony Sze-Fai Shiu argues that the differences between Duke Nukem 3D and its spiritual sequel Shadow Warrior (two games which are similar in gameplay but feature a white protagonist in one and a nonspecific East Asian character in the other) are contingent on the idea of a white protagonist as subjective, where the East Asian character is immutably attached to his race and stereotypical culture. Orlando's 2012 study found only 3 percent of protagonists to be East Asian; even among Japanese-made games, three-quarters of protagonists were white. Orlando believes this is because of the Japanese gaming industry's aim at the large North America and Europe markets.

=== Native American representation ===
The representation of Native American people and culture has been incorporated into media and video games since the early 1980’s. Most of these depictions revolve around negative stereotypical caricatures of actual Native people and their culture. Depicting Native characters as savages, overly spiritual beings, and even as the target of assault. For example, the first widespread game released depicting a Native character was Custer’s Revenge. Players of this game control the character of General Custer, who is depicted as mostly nude. The objective of the game is to get General Custer across the battlefield so that he can then rape a Native woman tied to a pole on the other side. This game represents a subconscious notion that it is acceptable and almost encouraged to dominate and assault Native people. Custer’s Revenge was later canceled and all available copies recalled after the National YWCA Racial Justice Group took the game to court in October 1982. The YWCA stated that if the game was able to continue production, it would lead to the continuation of a racist-sexist society.

More examples of negative Native American representation in video games include, the video game GUN, Oregon Trail, and Mortal Kombat with the character Nightwolf. These games represent more of the stereotypical Native representation most commonly seen within these forms of media. For instance, both the games GUN and Oregon Trail, depict Native characters as savages and enforces a harmful rhetoric that Native people and their culture is inherently harmful to America’s whiteness, a term used to describe how white people, their customs, culture, and beliefs operate as the standard by which all other groups of are compared. This is also the basis for microaggressions that are carried out on a daily basis against people of color. When it comes to the game Mortal Kombat, the depiction of the character Nightwolf, falls under the stereotype of the mystic-warrior. A term used to characterize a Native person who is deeply connected to the spiritual realm and nature. Nightwolf is a character who is set to defend a fictional realm within the game, his weapons consist of a bow and arrow as well as an ax, Nightwolf can also manipulate the spiritual realm by calling upon spirit animals. This can be seen as a caricature of Native people’s culture and spiritual beliefs as it implies all Natives are somehow whimsical and, in a sense, magical. It generalizes the origin of many Native groups and pushes the narrative that all Native people and cultures are the same.

Another example, Disney produced a video game after the release of the Pocahontas movie for the Game Boy and Sega Genesis, where players control Pocahontas and her animal sidekick Meeko through an adventure across the forest. This game exactly mirrors the Disney film, in which the real history of actual native american woman Pocahontas, captured by the English, forced to convert to Christianity and marry plantation owner John Rolfe and taken to England to be displayed as an example of a "civilized savage", got softened and retold as a love story between a native princess and an english explorer named John Smith. The game follows on the same problematic tropes as the movie, depicting the natives as magical creatures, downplaying colonialism and romanticizing the captured and rape of native American women.

A positive example of Native representation in video games is the mini game series Molly of Denali, based on the children’s television show of the same name. These games teach children about the Native Alaskan culture by having them follow the character of Molly throughout different daily tasks, traditional events, and culturally specific holidays. The Molly of Denali games not only teach children basic motor-skills, but also the importance of compassion and understanding. Games like Molly of Denali help counteract some of the negativity surrounding Native culture and provide a resource for people of any age to learn about a culture that may differ from their own. This in turn creates a more educated, safe, and culturally aware society for everyone.

== Controversies ==
There have been a number of controversies surrounding race and video games, including public debates about Resident Evil 5, Sid Meier's Civilization IV: Colonization, Left 4 Dead 2, BioShock Infinite, Homefront, World of Warcraft, Grand Theft Auto: Vice City, and Genshin Impact.

Video games may influence the learning of young players about race and urban culture. The portrayal of race in some video games such as the Grand Theft Auto series, Custer's Revenge, 50 Cent: Bulletproof, and Def Jam: Fight for NY has been controversial. The 2002 game Grand Theft Auto: Vice City was criticized as promoting racist hate crimes. The game takes place in 1986, in "Vice City", a fictionalized Miami. It involves a gang war between Haitian and Cuban refugees which involves the player's character. However, it is possible to play the game without excessive killing. The 2009 game Resident Evil 5 is set in Africa, and as such has the player kill numerous African antagonists. In response to criticism, promoters of Resident Evil 5 argued that to censor the portrayal of black antagonists was discrimination in itself.

In 2008, the release of Sid Meier's Civilization IV: Colonization was controversial for giving players the ability to colonize the Americas. For some critics, like Ben Fritz, the game was 'offensive' since it allowed players to do "horrific things ... or whitewash some of the worst events of human history." Fritz wrote, "the idea that 2K and Firaxis and Sid Meier himself would make and release a game in the year 2008 that is not only about colonization, but celebrates it by having the player control the people doing the colonizing is truly mind boggling." Firaxis Games' president Steve Martin responded by pointing out how "the game does not endorse any particular position or strategy—players can and should make their own moral judgments." There was significant backlash against Fritz on online forums and blogs, with some players defending in-game colonization as simply a realistic depiction of history. Rebecca Mir and Trevor Owens write that the game must necessarily depict the reality of colonization, and that if there is to be criticism, it should be that the violence of the experience is sanitized for players. Ken White responded to Fritz's post, writing "Empire-building games always involve conflict — often violent — with other people, and the more sophisticated ones almost always depict stronger groups overcoming weaker groups. Many involve religious or cultural conversion of some sort. Many permit digital genocide, with your little nation of abstractions defeating another little nation of abstractions mercilessly.... While the graphics, gameplay detail, and level of abstraction vary widely, they all come down to build, manage, conquer, and destroy." Media theorist Alexander Galloway, in his book, Gaming: Essays on Algorithmic Culture, argues about how these kinds of games are always an "ideological interpretation of history" that attempt to convert the breadth of history into a specific, preordained experience.

== Effects and applications ==
Video games have also had an effect on the ability of racial minorities to express their identities online in semi-protected environments. The extensive ability to modify users' avatars in some multiplayer games, such as Minecraft, allows players to alter their outer appearance in game to match their real life appearance as closely as they choose.

== See also ==
- List of black video game characters
- Indigenous people in video gaming
- Brittney Morris's 2019 novel SLAY portrays a Black teen who creates a massively multiplayer online game for Black gamers to escape racial harassment in mainstream games.
- Jynx, a Pokémon accused by some of representing a blackface caricature
- Gender representation in video games
