= Rabbit Chase =

Graphic novel by Elizabeth LaPensée and KC Oster

- Date: 2022
- Page count: 120 pages
- Publisher: Annick Press

Creative team
- Creator: Elizabeth LaPensée and KC Oster
- ISBN: 978-1-77321-620-1

Rabbit Chase is a graphic novel written for children aged 8–12 by Elizabeth LaPensée (Anishinaabe, Métis, and Irish) with art by KC Oster (Ojibwe-Anishinaabe) with translations by Aarin Migiziins Dokum (Odaawaa).

== Summary ==
The protagonist of the story is Aimée, a non-binary Indigenous Anishinabek schoolgirl who experiences racist bullying, variously for their Indigenous ethnicity and for adopting singular they pronouns.

Aimée and their fellow Indigenous Students Association members go on a field trip to visit Indigenous petroglyphs and make offerings to paayehnsag (water-spirits). Distracted by a game on their phone, in which they seeks solace from social isolation, Aimée drifts from the group into the woods and encounters the mythological rabbit-spirit Jiibayaabooz. Jiibayaabooz challenges Aimée to win the help of the paayehnsag in overcoming some evil waterspirits.

Aimée comes upon a tea party at which they meet the traditional hero (and rabbit) Nanaboozhoo, sharing blueberries, maple syrup, and coffee with them and their friends. They tell Aimée of a queen who, along with her robot army, has been colonising their land, marking her conquests by planting flowers. Aimée goes on to defeat the Queen at laser tag and has to flee to avoid being beheaded. Finally, they reaches the Paayehnsag, wins their trust, and the waterspirits are defeated.

Their quest complete, Aimée finds theirself back at the time and place where they were separated from the class, as if nothing had happened. Yet Aimée now finds that they are able to make friends in the real world.

== Use of Aninishinaabemowin ==
Characters in the book frequently use Anishinaabemowin words and phrases. The contributors to the volume saw it as contributing to language-revitalization. The volume contains the following glossary of Anishinaabemowin words; this table includes links to online Aninishinaabemowin dictionaries, where sound-files for some words are available.

Anishinaabemowin	Gloss	The Ojibwe People's Dictionary headword	Nishnaabemwin: Odawa & Eastern Ojibwe Online Dictionary headword
aambe	come on, come here		aambe
Aaniish go naa aapji?!	Jeez! / What in the world?! / What on earth?!		Aaniish go naa aapji?!
baashknjibgwaan	trillium		baashknjibgwaan
Baamaapii ka waamin	See you later	baamaapii	baamaapii
Boozhoo	Greetings!	boozhoo	boozhoo
deminan	strawberries	ode'imin	dewmin
ehn	yes	en'	enh
Jiibayaabooz (Jee-bye-ah-bows)	one of the Trickster brothers. He guides those who have passed on home along the Path of Spirits, the Milky Way.		Jiibyaabooz
makade-aaboo	coffee (black water)	makade-mashkikiwaabo	mkade-mskodiisminaaboo
miigwech	thanks, thank you	miigwech	miigwech
miinan	blueberries	miin	miin
minwaa	and/also	miinawaa	miinwaa
mnoomin	wild rice	manoomin	mnoomin
mskwaabik	copper (red metal)	miskwaabik	mskwaabik
Nanaboozhoo (Na-na-bow-zhoo)	the best known of the Trickster brothers. He often gets into trouble of his own making.		
Nbagminaandam	I am becoming hungry.	bagamanaandam	bgamnaandam
Ngiisaadendam	I am sorry. / I feel regret. / I am sad.		giisaadendam
niikaane	my older brother	=iikaan	niikaan
Paayehnsag	Little People, water spirits, rock spirits		
shtaahaa	wow!		shtaahaa
zgime’ig	mosquitoes	zagime	zgime
zhaagnaashag	white people	zhaaganaash	zhaagnaash
ziiwaagmide	maple syrup	zhiiwaagamizigan	ziiwaagmide
zinaakobiiganan	petroglyphs		mzinaabka'gan

== Reception ==
Writing in Anishinabek News, Karl Hele praised the book's "not-so-subtle references to the Crown, colonization, and environmental destruction", pointing out that the Queen and her conquests are "a lovely reference to the various treaties signed with the Crown and the introduction of invasive or non-native plants that often marked the extent of European expansion" in North America. He concluded that "I heartily recommend this graphic novel for pre-teens. It will appeal to their sense of humour, present the familiar, while teaching culture, language, and the importance of self. It deals with racism and self-doubt, and demonstrates how these can be overcome, or at least mitigated, through pride in culture, language, friends, and self-awareness. Overall, it is an excellent graphic novel and thoroughly enjoyable".

In the assessment of Kate Quealey-Gainer, "this graphic novel reinterprets Alice in Wonderland through Anishinaabe culture [...] LaPensée recasts it with indigenous elements and relies on context rather than exposition to clue in non-indigenous readers, making a unique creative product that provides just enough footing for curious readers to explore further on their own". Likewise, Allison Mills concluded that "Rabbit Chase relies somewhat on its audience’s familiarity with Alice in Wonderland, which may discourage some readers. That said, LaPensée’s story is so rooted in an Anishinaabe worldview and in Aimée’s personal growth that it is able to stand on its own". Mills also found that the "inclusion of Anishinaabemowin alongside the cultural touchstones found throughout the narrative is one of the book’s great strengths". Contemplating the book's achievement, Quealey-Gainer found that "the palette plays a significant role here, with the brown and sepia tones of the real world replaced with dreamy jewel and inky hues, and silhouettes are used particularly effectively, creating an otherworldliness that walks the line between whimsy and menace".

LaPensée said that they would donate their royalties "to the protection and recognition of the Sanilac petroglyphs".
