= Elizabeth LaPensée =

American researcher of video game culture

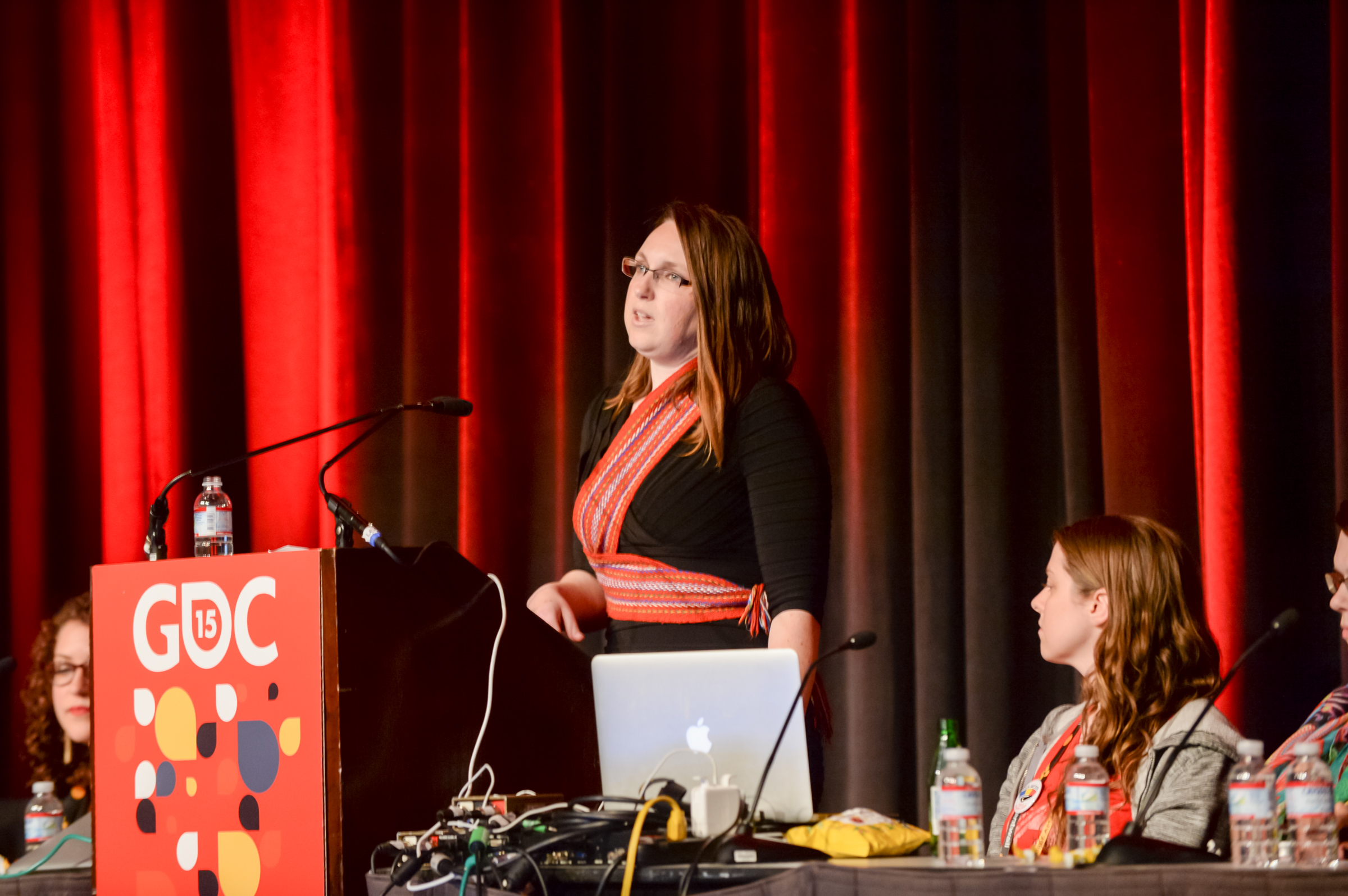
- Born: 1984 (age 41–42); Anaheim, California
- Citizenship: American
- Occupations: Professor, artist, game designer, writer, and researcher

Academic background
- Education: Portland State University; Simon Fraser University
- Thesis: Survivance: An Indigenous Social Impact Game (2014)
- Doctoral advisor: Ron Wakkary

Academic work
- Institutions: Michigan State University

Elizabeth LaPensée (born 1984) is an American game designer and games researcher. She is currently the Narrative Director at Twin Suns Corp, a Seattle-based AAA studio. She has previously worked as an associate professor in the Department of Writing, Rhetoric, and American Cultures at Michigan State University. She studies and creates video games, interactive digital media, animation, visual art, and comics to express Indigenous ways of knowing.

== Background ==
Elizabeth LaPensée was born in Anaheim, California, in 1984. Her mother is Grace Dillon, a professor at Portland State University. LaPensée has stated in 2018 that she is of Anishinaabe and Métis heritage. She uses both she and they pronouns.

== Education ==
LaPensée received her PhD from Simon Fraser University. Her dissertation was on the benefits of playing Survivance, a social impact game that uplifts storytelling, art, and self-determination as a pathway to healing from Indigenous historical trauma.

== Game design ==
LaPensée designs games around Indigenous ways of knowing. Active as a community organizer, she often collaborates with Indigenous community partners to create games. She argues that Indigenous practices and teachings can inspire innovative game mechanics. Her games provide an interactive way of engaging with and continuing on Indigenous cultures and history. Her game Honour Water (2016) is a singing-game that teaches Anishinaabe water songs. In 2014, LaPensée spoke out against a remake of Custer's Revenge, a controversial game that allows the player, as General Custer, to rape a Native American woman.

LaPensée's game Invaders was featured in the 2015 ImagineNATIVE Film + Media Arts Festival in Toronto.

She organized the first Natives in Game Development Gathering at the University of California, Santa Cruz, in May 2015.

== Indigenous futurism ==
LaPensée's research is often cited in connection with Indigenous Futurisms. She was an early research assistant with Aboriginal Territories in Cyberspace (AbTeC) and research affiliate with the Initiative for Indigenous Futures (IIF). Her mother, scholar Grace Dillon, describes LaPensée's sci-fi animations as a "must-see" example of how Indigenous storytelling can transform the way Indigenous futures are imagined. Kristina Baudemann argues that LaPensée, despite being perceived as a white woman, retains an ability to draw on her ancestry to create new representations of Indigenous people.

== Awards ==
In 2017, LaPensée received the Serious Games Community Leadership Award from the Serious Games Special Interest Group of the International Game Developers Association and she was named one of Motherboard's Humans of the Year, a series of profiles recognizing people in science and technology who are building a better future for everyone. Her game Thunderbird Strike won the prize for Best Digital Media Work at the 2017 ImagineNATIVE Film + Media Arts Festival.

In April 2018, LaPensée was selected as a Guggenheim Fellow in the fine arts category. When Rivers Were Trails was awarded Best Adaptation at IndieCade 2019.

== Works ==
=== Games ===
- Weird West (2022)
- When Rivers Were Trails (2019)
- Dialect (2017)
- Thunderbird Strike (2017)
- Coyote Quest (2017)
- Manoominike (2017)
- Mikan (2017)
- Honour Water (2016)
- Little Earth Strong (2016)
- Singuistics: Anishinaabemowin (2016)
- Invaders (2015) (with Trevino Brings Plenty and Steven Paul Judd)
- Ninagamomin ji-nanaandawi'iwe (2015)
- The Gift of Food (2014)
- Gathering Native Foods (2014)
- Max's Adventure (2013)
- Mawisowin (2012)
- Survivance (2011)
- Techno Medicine Wheel (2008)
- Venture Arctic (2007)

=== Graphic Novels ===
- Rabbit Chase, illustrated by KC Oster (Annick Press, 2022)
