= No Man's Land (video game) =

2003 video game

- Developer: Related Designs
- Publishers: CDV Software (retail); Strategy First (digital)
- Platform: Microsoft Windows
- Release: NA: October 20, 2003
- Genre: Real-time strategy
- Modes: Single-player, Multiplayer

No Man's Land, also known as No Man's Land: Fight for your Rights!, is a 2003 real-time strategy video game for Microsoft Windows developed by Related Designs and published by CDV Software.

The game was made available for purchase on Steam on July 19th 2025.

== Gameplay ==
The game is set in the New World where the players can play as one of the six factions. Playable factions are the English, Spaniards, American Patriots, American Settlers, Woodland Native Americans, and Prairie Native Americans. Every faction has its own strength and weaknesses and heroes. The single player contains three campaigns.

Campaigns:

- In the first campaign called The Conquest of a New World the players fight as the Spaniards led by Capitan Esteban Carvinez against the English and native tribes.
- In the second campaign The called Fight against The Intruders the players take the role of the natives and fight against European intruders. The first half focuses on Magua and the Iroquois fighting against the English. The second half jumps many years ahead in which Grass Wing of the Cheyenne fights against American Settlers and their allied Crow tribe natives.
- The last and third campaign called The birth of a nation follows the Sanders family. The first part follows Jeremiah Sanders and takes place during the English Colonization of America in which English pilgrims fight through Spanish en route and unruly natives on American lands, eventually battling fanatical Pilgrim forces led by his former friend Aaron Harper. The second part follows Samuel Sanders during the American Revolutionary War in which he must lead American forces against the British, even seeking help from Magua, chieftain of the Iroquois. The third and final part follows William "Billy" Sanders as he and his settlers compete to build a railroad before his opponent Henry Starr does while dealing with Starr's forces and hostile natives.

== Reception ==
Reception

Aggregate scores
Aggregator	Score
GameRankings	65.86%
Metacritic	70/100

The game received mainly mixed to positive reviews. On Metacritic, it holds an aggregate score of 70 out of 100, based on twelve reviews. On GameRankings, it holds a score of 65.86%, based on fourteen reviews.

== See also ==
- America
- Castle Strike
