= Data Becker =

Defunct German publisher

Data Becker GmbH & Co. KG

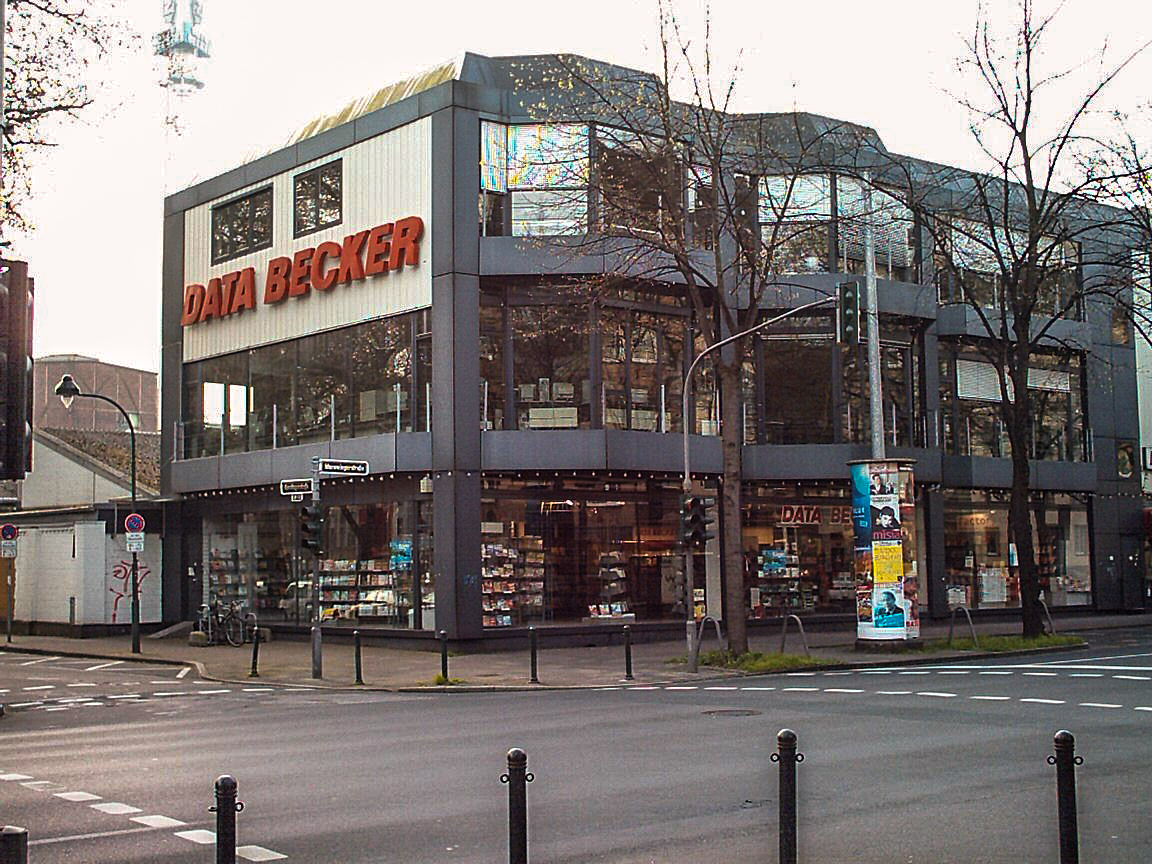
- Industry: Information technology
- Founded: 1980; 46 years ago
- Founder: Achim Becker and Harald Becker
- Defunct: 2014
- Website: databecker.de at the Wayback Machine (archived 2013-03-28)

Data Becker GmbH & Co. KG was a German publisher of computer books and a company for software and computer accessories based in Düsseldorf. The company ceased operations in March 2014.

== History ==
It was founded in Düsseldorf on January 7, 1981, by Dr. Achim Becker and Harald Becker, initially as a specialist shop for computer accessories, entered the publishing business in 1983 after home computers such as the C64 became commercially successful, and since then has published software, IT literature and computer trade journals. Data Becker was mostly well known for its web publishing software, Web to date.

=== The 1980s: Home computing ===
In the beginning, Data Becker catered primarily to users of Commodore 64 and C128 home computers, publishing an extensive range of books as well as programming tools and application software. The most advanced of the company's books delved deeply into the internals of the aforementioned computers and their peripherals, often revealing features that were undocumented by the manufacturer.

=== The 1990s: Licences abroad ===
In the United States, English editions of Data Becker's home computing books and software were published by Abacus Software. In the British market, initially First Publishing Ltd, did the same job, followed by Data Player Ltd t/a Data Becker UK from 1993 to 2001. The Danish and Norwegian markets were supplied with Danish language editions of the software and books by publishing house Nordic Computer Software (NCS). The French editions were published by Micro Application.

In the late 1990s, in Germany, Data Becker also marketed Chessbase's Shredder and Fritz chess programs as 3D Schach Genie or Schach Genie.

=== 2000: International failure ===
In an attempt to become a worldwide publisher, Data Becker UK Ltd. was established in 1999. Data Becker Companies in the US, Spain and the Netherlands followed. Data Becker UK had initial success with their music-software range (Music Center was voted "Music Production Software of the Year" in 2000 by Future Music, Music CD Recorder, MP3 Wizard) but it soon vanished as the publisher pressed for a more family-oriented portfolio with titles like "3D Home Designer", "Becker Draw', Becker CAD 3d' and "Becker Chart" and credibility in professional markets was lost. Overall this strategy did not prove successful and the offices of Data Becker UK and Data Becker USA (in Boston) were closed down in 2003. . In 2001, Data Becker employed around 160 people. The company headquarters of Data Becker was in Düsseldorf-Bilk, the magazine editorial office and the book publisher were in the immediate vicinity. The shop was given up in 2011.

=== 2014: Closure of all business operations ===
In October 2013, the head company in Germany announced it was going to suspend all business activities at the 31st of March 2014. The online shop was closed on February 17, 2014.

== Products ==
In the area of software, Data Becker published programs for Internet projects (website, online shop, community) and private users (system tools, print applications and planning software, "Golden Series"). The last products in the software segment were Web to date and PDF Professional. In 2000, the computer game America: No Peace Beyond the Line, developed by Related Designs, was released. PC accessories such as ink cartridges and cleaning products were also offered. The company's products have been distributed in several European countries as well as the United States.

== Magazines ==
Data Becker also published several German computer magazines:

- DATA WELT was launched in 1984 and was published until 1989. It started as a home-computer magazine and covered platforms such as the Commodore C64/C128, Amiga, Atari, and Sinclair.

- PC Praxis started in 1987 and became a monthly magazine in 1989. It was published until March 2014 and had a peak circulation of 200K. The magazine was Data Becker's most successful magazine and covered major hardware and software, contained many tutorials and also started early on to extend the magazine with software on CDs and later DVDs.

- PC Intern

- Linux Intern

- Windows Intern

- Internet Intern

- Foto Praxis
