= Never Alone (video game) =

2014 video game

- Developer: Upper One Games
- Publisher: E-Line Media
- Director: Sean Vesce
- Producer: Matt Swanson
- Designer: Grant Roberts
- Programmer: David Koenig
- Artist: Dima Veryovka
- Writers: Ishmael Angaluuk Hope, based on the traditional Iñupiaq tale, "Kunuuksaayuka", first recorded by Robert Nasruk Cleveland in Stories of the Black River People
- Engine: Unity
- Platforms: Linux; Windows; OS X; PlayStation 3; PlayStation 4; Wii U; Xbox One; iOS; Android; Switch
- Release: Windows; November 18, 2014; PlayStation 4: NA: November 18, 2014; EU: November 26, 2014; JP: December 11, 2014; Xbox One; November 19, 2014; OS X February 26, 2015; Wii U: NA: June 25, 2015; EU: July 9, 2015; PlayStation 3: EU: December 22, 2015; NA: December 23, 2015; Linux; December 23, 2015 iOS; June 2, 2016; Android; June 22, 2016; Switch; February 24, 2022
- Genre: Puzzle-platform
- Modes: Single-player, multiplayer

Never Alone, also known as Kisima Inŋitchuŋa (Note: Iñupiaq translating to "I am not alone") (Note: mostly marketed under the title Never Alone (Kisima Ingitchuna)) is a puzzle-platform adventure video game developed by Upper One Games and published by E-Line Media and was first released in November 2014. It is based on the traditional Iñupiaq tale, "Kunuuksaayuka", which was first recorded by storyteller Robert Nasruk Cleveland in his collection Stories of the Black River People. Swapping between an Iñupiat girl named Nuna and her Arctic fox companion, the player completes puzzles while part of the story is narrated in the Iñupiaq language. The game was made in partnership between the Cook Inlet Tribal Council and E-Line Media and is a video game produced by Indigenous people. A DLC, titled Never Alone: Foxtales was released on July 28, 2015 and a sequel was announced in February 2022. The game received multiple awards and is praised positively for its concept, story and art design but criticized for its platforming elements.

== Gameplay and plot ==
The player-character plays as the Iñupiat girl Nuna and her Arctic fox. As an "atmospheric puzzle platformer", Never Alone's puzzles entail swapping control between Nuna and the fox. While the fox is fast, Nuna can pick up things and open new areas using her bola. The story and its structure is based on the intergenerational transference of wisdom. The story is separated into eight chapters. The story is narrated in Iñupiaq by James Nageak. Unlike traditional platformer games, which involve overcoming obstacles and defeating enemies, Never Alone rewards players with collectible "cultural insights", short videos of Iñupiaq elders, storytellers, and community members sharing their stories. The central plot is set in the harsh physical environment of Alaskan snowy plains and revolves around discovering the source of the blizzard that has ravaged Nuna's village and restoring balance to nature. Other stories include that of Blizzard Man, the Little People, Manslayer, the Rolling Heads, and the Sky People. It takes place in a harsh physical environment. The game has official subtitles in 16 languages.

== Development and release ==
Never Alone was developed by Upper One Games in conjunction with writer Ishmael Hope, a storyteller and poet of Iñupiaq and Tlingit heritage, and the Cook Inlet Tribal Council, a non-profit organization that works with indigenous groups living in Alaska's urban areas. The Council partnered with video game education company E-Line Media and generated the idea for Never Alone as part of a series that "shares, celebrates, and extends [indigenous] culture". The council's for-profit Upper One Games is the "first indigenous-owned video game developer and publisher in US history". They built the game to explore "what it means to be human" and intergenerational stories. It is intended both to share the stories of native culture as entertainment, and to revitalize interest in Alaskan indigenous folklore. Proceeds from the game will fund the council's education mission.

E-Line Creative Director Sean Vesce was excited by the opportunity to "go into a community, learn more about a culture and then try to infuse their values and mythologies into a game". Vesce and his team made "a dozen trips to Alaska" to meet with community members and gather stories and imagery and was "blown away at the richness and beauty and depth of that storytelling tradition". He realized that "none of that had really been ever explored in a videogame". Vesce previously held leadership positions at Crystal Dynamics and Activision. Vesce built and led a 12-member development team in Seattle, who worked in deep partnership with "40 Alaska Native elders, storytellers and community members" to craft the game. Never Alone was built in the Unity game engine. A local-cooperative mode is available.

=== Never Alone: Foxtales ===
The first expansion for the game, titled Never Alone: Foxtales, was announced on July 16, 2015. Adding new levels and expanding upon the story, the expansion was released worldwide on July 28, 2015, for Microsoft Windows, PlayStation 4, and Xbox One. The expansion was also included with the base game at no additional cost for the Nintendo Switch on February 24, 2022.

== Reception ==
Reception

Aggregate score
Aggregator	Score
Metacritic	PS4: 73/100; PC: 72/100; WIIU: 67/100; XONE: 66/100; NS: 68/100

Review scores
Publication	Score
Destructoid	XONE: 7/10
Eurogamer	10/10
Game Informer	PC: 6.5/10
GameRevolution	9/10
GameSpot	4/10
GamesRadar+	PS4: 2/5
Hardcore Gamer	PS4: 2.5/5
Joystiq	PC: 4.5/5
Nintendo Life	WIIU: 5/10
Nintendo World Report	WIIU: 7/10
PC Gamer (US)	PC: 85/100
Polygon	PS4: 7/10
Push Square	PS4: 8/10
The Guardian	PC: 4/5
TouchArcade	MOB: 4/5
VentureBeat	PS4: 65/100

Awards
Publication	Award
BAFTA	Best Debut (2015)
Games for Change	Game of the Year (2015)
Games for Change	Most Significant Impact (2015)

Never Alone received many accolades, including the British Academy Games Award for Best Debut Game, as well as Game of the Year and Most Significant Impact awards from the Games for Change organization. In 2014, Never Alone was an Official Selection Finalist at Indiecade. At The Game Awards 2014, Never Alone received a nomination in the "Games for Change" category. In 2015, Never Alone received nominations for Outstanding Achievement in Game Direction from the AIAS' D.I.C.E. Awards, Best Debut from the Game Developers Choice Awards, and Matthew Crump Cultural Innovation Award from the SXSW Gaming Awards. Never Alone also won an Interactive Narrative and Game + Play Peabody Award in 2021.

Never Alone received "mixed or average" reviews, according to video game review aggregator Metacritic.

Critics positively noted the game's art design, which blends a simple, cartoon style with scrimshaw influences. The included documentary videos were also remarked upon as "[leaving the player] feeling educated as well as entertained" and "[doing] an excellent job of giving a cultural context" for the game. In their review, Wired cited the cultural insights as "the best parts of Never Alone".

The platforming elements of Never Alone were more divisive. Some reviewers described the game as "frustrating", noting imprecise controls and inconsistent behavior by in-game characters. However, other critics felt the gameplay was diverse and "satisfying".

In 2022 the Museum of Modern Art included the game in their exhibition Never Alone: Video Games and Other Interactive Design and is now a permanent addition to MOMA's evolving collection of nearly 200,000 pieces of modern and contemporary art.

== Sequel ==
A sequel titled Never Alone 2 was announced in 2024.
