= Thunderbird Strike =

2017 video game

- Developer: Elizabeth LaPensée
- Platforms: Microsoft Windows, Android, iOS
- Release: 2017

Thunderbird Strike is a side-scrolling video game created by Elizabeth LaPensée. In this game the player controls Thunderbird, a legendary creature from the mythology of some North American indigenous peoples, which flies from the Alberta tar sands to the Great Lakes, and along the way attempts to destroy oil industry infrastructure and equipment while trying to revive dead wildlife. LaPensée says the game is a protest about pipeline construction on Indigenous land, while telling stories from her culture and encouraging players to take care of Turtle Island.

The game is available for Microsoft Windows, Android and iOS.

The game opens with an introduction video of dump trucks driving across the screen with a backdrop of pollution-releasing factories. Controlling Thunderbird, the player is tasked with collecting lightning from the clouds and using the power of the lightning to disable various infrastructure components associated with the oil industry such as dump trucks, factories, oil rigs, and pipelines.

There is a major artistic component to the game and lots of indigenous imagery scattered throughout. LaPensée calls the art style "woodland" or x-ray," and in Anishinaabe culture, this relates to the connection between breath, lightning, and energy. The introductory video in addition to videos shown between each level provide some context and awareness of the underlying protest message. After completing the first level, there is a video presenting individuals protesting against the construction of oil pipelines on indigenous lands. In the third level, the player encounters a giant animated snake portrayed as a pipeline and must use lightning to destroy it. Following the third level, there is another video that appears to show animals returning to the area after the victory over the oil pipeline snake. There is an additional scene of oil rigs transitioning to wind turbines, indicating a support for more sustainable, renewable energy.

Indigenous communities have had a long history of struggles with the oil industry such as the widespread controversy surrounding the Dakota Access Pipeline. Thunderbird Strike offers a form of protest to this pervasive issue through the media of video games.

== Reception ==
The game has been met with both support and criticism. It was criticised by the pipe-line advocacy group Energy Builders as having been designed to encourage eco-terrorism. The game had received funding from the Minnesota State Arts Board and the Arrowhead Regional Arts Council, and Minnesota state senator David Osmek called for an investigation into the $4,000 funding.

Senator Osmek is quoted as saying, “Minnesota taxpayers expect their money to be invested in Minnesota, not in funding an eco-terrorist version of Angry Birds.” Thunderbird Strike was permitted to receive its grant due to the Clean Water, Land and Legacy Amendment to the state constitution.

Dr. Johannes M. Bauer, chairperson of the Department of Media and Information at Michigan State University, considers the game to be “a creative work of art that addresses some of the important issues of our time.” Bauer described Dr. LaPensée as "a fantastic artist, writer and game designer,” and that “Thunderbird Strike links indigenous stories and symbols to current issues of public importance.”

The game won the Best Digital Media Work award at the 2017 imagineNATIVE Film + Media Arts Festival.
