= South Ferry Plaza =

Unbuilt skyscraper in Manhattan, New York

- The South Ferry Plaza Building Model.
- Interactive map of the South Ferry Plaza area

General information
- Status: Never built
- Type: Office
- Location: Lower Manhattan; New York City
- Coordinates: 40°42′3.22″N 74°0′47.01″W
- Construction started: Never
- Estimated completion: Never

Height
- Roof: 1,084 feet (330 m)

Technical details
- Floor count: 60
- Floor area: 1,500,000 ft^{2} (139,000 m^{2})

Design and construction
- Architects: Fox & Fowle Architects; Leslie E. Robertson Associates
- Developer: Frank Williams

The South Ferry Plaza, also called A Lighthouse At The Tip Of The Island, was a supertall skyscraper proposed in 1987 to rise right next to the East River on Manhattan Island in New York City. The building would have sat on top of the South Ferry terminal and tower 1,084 ft (330 m) above street level, with 60 stories of office space. It was designed by architect Fox & Fowle Architects and Leslie E. Robertson Associates. The architects designed the building for office use and the skyscraper incorporated recycled marble and steel with glass in its structure. The architectural plan had a glass dome that was supposed to be lit at night, which also contained an observation deck and three restaurants located inside the dome. In addition, the project called for the renovation of the South Ferry Terminal, including the train station so it can accommodate 100,000 people. The project would have doubled the size of Battery Park if it had proceeded, since the building included a plaza that was planned to tie in with Battery Park via a new promenade at the tip of Manhattan. The project was canceled in 1991 because of a lack of funding.

== See also ==
- List of tallest buildings in New York City
