= America (video game) =

2000 video game

- German box cover
- Developer: Related Designs
- Publisher: Data Becker
- Director: Thomas Pottkämper
- Designers: Stefan Binder; Andreas Liebeskind; Thomas Pottkämper; Christian Schmittgen
- Programmer: Thomas Stein
- Artist: Igor Posavec
- Composer: Andreas Liebeskind
- Platform: Microsoft Windows
- Release: EU: December 2000; NA: 15 January 2001
- Genre: Real-time strategy
- Mode: Single-player

America is a historical real-time strategy game developed by Related Designs and published by Data Becker, released in December 2000 and January 2001 to mixed reviews. Set in a post-civil war America in the wild west, the game plays similarly to Age of Empires. The player may choose to control a group of either settlers, Native Americans, Mexicans or outlaws of that time.

== Development ==
America was the first released game developed by German studio Related Designs after the studio had been founded in 1995, and the first full-price game published by Data Becker. The game was conceptualised at Data Becker in 1998 and developed in less than 23 months. In Germany, the game was released in late December 2000; a release in North America followed on 15 January 2001. The game was released for Microsoft Windows, specifically supporting the Windows 95, 98, 2000 and Me versions.

== Reception ==
Reception

Aggregate score
Aggregator	Score
Metacritic	50/100

Review scores
Publication	Score
Computer Games Strategy Plus	2.5/5
Computer Gaming World	2/5
EP Daily	5.5/10
Game Informer	6.5/10
GameSpot	4.8/10
GameZone	8.5/10
IGN	4.5/10
Jeuxvideo.com	15/20
Next Generation	3/5
PC Gamer (US)	48%

America received "mixed or average" reviews, according to the review aggregation website Metacritic. John Lee of NextGen said that the game was "still a kick, even if the history is skewed. Many of us grew up playing cowboys and Indians, and we're primed for covered wagons, and cavalry charges. The fun wears thin quickly enough, but the game still has its charm. Now if only the Germans could polish up their American history."

== Expansion ==
An expansion pack to America, titled America: Expansion Pack, added eight further missions, a level editor, a multiplayer mode, a revamped game engine to allow for improved artificial intelligence, gameplay and graphics, as well as new units and buildings, to the game. It was also developed by Related Designs, and announced by Data Becker in May 2001, scheduled for release in Germany in September 2001. In North America, Data Becker released the expansion pack on 17 December 2001.

== Sequel ==
On 9 March 2001, CDV Software, by press release, announced that it was producing a real-time strategy developed by Related Designs, tentatively titled America II. Data Becker, which owned the rights to the America name, took notice and inquired CDV to cease and desist shortly thereafter. CDV declined to do so as it found no copyright infringement in America II's title, though opted to file for a caveat to protect itself from a preliminary injunction. Data Becker subsequently filed for a preliminary injunction with the Landgericht Berlin on 29 March 2001. At the time, Data Becker intended to produce an America sequel of its own. Data Becker won the case by May, wherefore CDV had to drop the America II title, though it was allowed to continue producing the game under a different name. As a result, America II was retitled No Man's Land. and was set in early colonial america of the 17th century to the 18th century rather than 19th century to early 20th century american frontier However, CDV continued advertising America II through press releases and its newsletter, prompting further action by Data Becker. CDV also registered the internet domain "america2.de" with registrar DENIC, which redirected users to the website of No Man's Land; a judgement reached by the Kammergericht in Berlin in December 2002 ordered CDV to inquire the deletion of the domain with DENIC and publicise a press release to announce that it was not releasing a game titled America II in 2003.

Data Becker proceeded to produce its own sequel to America, to be titled America 2 or America II, by June 2001, planning to release it in the first quarter of 2003. Data Becker announced its sequel in February 2003, with its release scheduled for later that year. A website for the game was launched in May 2003. It was also scheduled to be displayed at E3 2002. America II was later cancelled.
