= Hill Agency: PURITYdecay =

Windows video game

- Developer: Achimostawinan Games
- Publisher: Achimostawinan Games
- Director: Meagan Byrne
- Designer: Meagan Byrne
- Artist: Sa'dekaronhes Esquivel
- Writer: Meagan Byrne
- Composers: Colin R. Lloyd, Honor.beatz
- Engine: Unreal Engine 4
- Platform: Windows
- Release: March 31, 2023
- Genre: Single player
- Mode: Single-player

Hill Agency: PURITYdecay is a 3D third-person narrative detective game developed and published by Achimostawinan Games. The game is set in the year 2762, and the player controls Meeygen Hill, an indigenous private investigator who is tasked with solving a murder. Hill Agency: PURITYdecay was released on March 31, 2023 on Steam.

== Gameplay ==
Hill Agency: PURITYdecay is a 3D third-person point-and-click detective game that takes place in the year 2762, in a North American Indigenous metropolis. The player plays as the Néhinaw (Cree) private investigator, Meeygen Hill, who aids Mary Patentia, an elite citizen from the Risen City, in solving a case about murdered sisters. The game tasks the player with interviewing in-game characters and collecting physical evidence, all of which is stored in a notebook that is available to the player at all times. The player is not punished for wrong answers but is instead encouraged to continue obtaining new evidence to undo mistakes. Ultimately, the goal is to uncover who is behind the murder via logic and investigation.

== Development and release ==
The game was developed by Achimostawinan Games, an Indigenous game studio, led by founder Meagan Byrne, a Canadian Âpihtawikosisân/Métis mechanics and narrative designer. Byrne also served as the designer and writer of the game. Colin R. Lloyd and Honor.beats worked as composers for the game's soundtrack. Throughout there are strong ties to Indigenous cultures with the majority of the creative team being Indigenous from Turtle Island in North America. The game is described as fitting into the genres of Indigenous Futurism, Cyberpunk, and Noir. Hill Agency:PURITYdecay was released to the public on Steam on March 31, 2023.

== Reception ==
The game received numerous awards and recognition in its first year of release. Prior to release, it was recognized by the Ubisoft Indie Series in 2022 and was named the Ontario Grand Prize winner. After its release, the game was recognized at the imagineNative Film + Media Arts Festival and was awarded the Digital + Interactive Award. The game was also given the recognition of Certified Cosmic Banger by Steam Future of Play Direct, under the category of "Doing Crime Without The Time". At the 2024 GDC conference, the game was selected as one of eight "Best in Play" games.

Reception

Awards
Publication	Award
imagineNative	Digital + Interactive Award
imagineNative	Official Selection
Steam Future of Play Direct	Certified Cosmic Banger
Ubisoft Indie Series	2022 Grand Prize Winner
