= Civilization IV: Colonization =

2008 video game

- North American cover art
- Developer: Firaxis Games
- Publisher: 2K Games (Note: Mac OS X port developed and published by Aspyr.)
- Designer: H. Edward Piper
- Series: Civilization
- Engine: Gamebryo
- Platforms: Windows, Mac OS X
- Release: Windows: NA: September 23, 2008; AU: September 25, 2008; EU: September 26, 2008; Mac OS X: NA: December 22, 2009; EU: May 12, 2010
- Genre: Turn-based strategy
- Modes: Single-player, multiplayer

Sid Meier's Civilization IV: Colonization is a remake of the 1994 turn-based strategy game Sid Meier's Colonization. Players control settlers from one of four European nations – Spain, England, France, and the Netherlands – that are trying to conquer/colonize the New World in the period 1492–1792. The victorious player is the first to build up his colonies and army, declare independence from the mother country, and defeat the military force that the king inevitably sends to crush the rebellion.

The Windows version was released on September 23, 2008. A Mac OS X version was released in December 2009. Sid Meier's Civilization IV: Colonization does not require the original Sid Meier's Civilization IV in order to play.

== Gameplay ==
Gameplay screenshot

To build their cities, players must balance negotiations with several groups: the natives of the Americas, colonists from the player's home country and other colonists from the old world. Players may also recruit founding fathers to join their cause, each with a specific bonus that helps throughout the game. The player influences the direction of his colony through choices in diplomacy, recruitment and city management. Additional colonists from Europe or converted natives can result in population increases after food surpluses exceed a preset level.

Economics and trade come into play when the player makes finished goods and sells them in Europe or trades with the natives for other goods or gold. By harvesting natural resources, skilled craftsmen can convert them into finished goods for sale or trade. Additionally, silver can be mined for direct trade and ore can be mined to turn into tools and then in turn guns. Skilled craftsmen produce twice as much as regular workers and specialist buildings can be built to increase overall production as well.

The player's selection of nationality, made at the start of the game, affects the colony's standing in the world: the English receive an immigration bonus, the Dutch enjoy trade bonuses, the French diplomacy edge encourages more favorable relations with native tribes, while the Spanish Conquistador bonus favors conquest against the natives.

List of civilizations (Note: The only playable civilizations are the colonies.)
Civilization	Leader(s)
New England	John Adams
New England	George Washington
New France	Louis de Frontenac
New France	Samuel de Champlain
New Netherlands	Adriaen van der Donck
New Netherlands	Peter Stuyvesant
New Spain	Simón Bolívar
New Spain	José de San Martín
England	King of England
France	King of France
Netherlands	King of the Netherlands
Spain	King of Spain
Apache	Mangas Coloradas
Arawak	Agueybana
Aztecs	Montezuma II
Cherokee	Oconostota
Incas	Huayna Capac
Iroquois	Logan
Sioux	Sitting Bull
Tupi	Cunhambebe

In addition to single-player campaigns, the new game has a multiplayer component.

Civilization IV: Colonization has many new gameplay mechanics. When starting the game, in addition to choosing a starting European nation, a player chooses between two governors, each with different advantages. In addition, national borders is a gameplay concept taken from Civilization IV. This means that rivals cannot pass into each other's land unless they have an open borders agreement — or they have declared war.

Unlike the original Colonization game, nations cannot recruit the same founding fathers. Each founding father is recruited by one and only one nation/player. Moreover, founding fathers will only join nations with certain criteria, namely a certain level of "points" obtained in various categories (political, military, exploration, religion, and trade).

After the player declares independence, players draft a constitution determining the government style of their independent nation. For example, if a nation chooses a monarchical system, then it can still trade with Europe during the war for independence.

== Development ==
The game runs on an upgraded version of the Civilization IV engine with changes including enhanced graphics, streamlined code, and redesigned interfaces. With these enhancements, Colonization requires video cards that support Pixel Shader 1.1 (Direct X 8.0).

== Reception ==
Reception

Aggregate scores
Aggregator	Score
GameRankings	80%
Metacritic	83/100

Review scores
Publication	Score
1Up.com	A
Computer and Video Games	7.9/10
Eurogamer	8/10
G4	4/5
Game Informer	9/10
GameSpot	8/10
GameSpy	4/5
IGN	8.7/10
X-Play	4/5

The single victory condition – declaring and winning a war for independence – has been both criticized and accepted by reviewers. Another criticism of the game is that it only has four playable colonial powers. The exclusion of Europe's other prominent colonial powers has been called a "limiting" factor in the game.

Variety video games reporter and reviews editor Ben Fritz criticized the concept of the game in his blog because of issues such as the depopulation of Indigenous Americans and the Atlantic slave trade that occurred during European and American colonization. Firaxis has responded to Fritz's blog post with the statement, "the game does not endorse any particular position or strategy – players can and should make their own moral judgments." Trevor Owens contributed to the conversation in an article that considers the game's usage of different, arguably problematic elements, asking "wouldn't, and shouldn't, any game about that period in the Americas be racist and offensive, if it were even remotely faithful to that time period?"

== See also ==
- FreeCol, an open source Colonization clone
