= Indigenous futurisms =

Indigenous literary and artistic movement

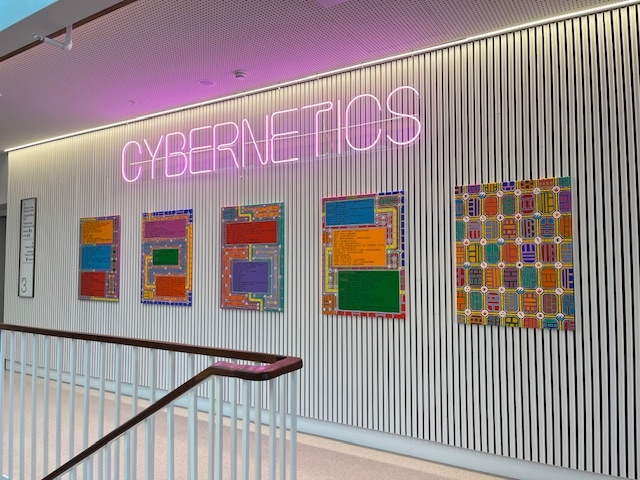
Indigenous Futurisms and AI presentation at Amberin Kwaymullina in 2024

Indigenous Futurisms is a movement in literature, visual art, comics, video games, and other media that expresses Indigenous perspectives of the future, past, and present in the context of science fiction and related sub-genres. Such perspectives may reflect Indigenous ways of knowing, oral history, historical or contemporary politics, and cultural perspectives.

== Background ==
In the late 20th century, Indigenous artists and writers experimented with science fiction and images of Indigenous lifeways through different spaces and times. In her anthology, Walking the Clouds: An Anthology of Indigenous Science-Fiction (2012), Grace Dillon outlines how science fiction can aid processes of decolonization. Using tools like slipstream, worldbuilding, science fiction and anthropological First Contact scenarios, Indigenous communities construct self-determined representations and alternative narratives about their identities and futures. Indigenous futurists critique the exclusion of Indigenous people from the contemporary world and challenge notions of what constitutes advanced technology. In so doing, the movement questions the digital divide, noting that Indigenous peoples have at once been purposefully excluded from accessing media technologies and constructed as existing outside of modernity. The widespread use of personal computers and the Internet following the Digital Revolution created conditions in which, to some extent, Indigenous peoples may participate in the creation of a network of self-representations.

Grace Dillon, editor of Walking the Clouds: An Anthology of Indigenous Science Fiction, encouraged stories through IIF, the Imagining Indigenous Futurisms Science Fiction Contest.

Chickasaw scholar Jenny L. Davis emphasizes the importance of Indigenous languages to the articulation and understanding of Indigenous temporalities.

== Themes ==
At its base, Indigenous futurisms envisions alternative futures where indigenous peoples are allowed to reclaim agency, sovereignty, and cultural continuity over culture, which may have been lost to time as well as cultural genocide. Through speculative storytelling, relationships are re-imagined with land, technology and spirituality, while interconnection and harmony of a social, spiritual and ecological nature are emphasized. Concepts of time, space, identity, and belonging are redefined to offer insights into indigenous worldviews and spiritual practices. Indigenous futurisms have been applied for recognizing colonialism and genocide and for determining how to achieve a more peaceful coexistence with one's gender and environment.

=== Anti-colonialism and cultural genocide rhetoric ===
Much of Indigenous futurisms exists as a way to speculate about futures without the interference of Western countries, namely Spain, France, and Britain, and explores ideas about what an American community would look like without the influence of European colonization. Most of these stories include either a community thriving on the same scale as modern America while being more symbiotic with its environment, or a community of oppressed citizens or refugees who long to return to a time or place where such things were possible.

While in some part, genocide in Indigenous communities might normally only be attributed to the early Americans. However, genocide is defined as the deliberate and systematic destruction of a group of people because of their ethnicity, nationality, religion, or race. American Indian boarding schools in the last 100 years have been responsible for beating Indigenous children into learning and accepting customs from America at the time. This interference has since been labeled as genocide, and Indigenous futurist novels often speculate on a future where this culture was allowed to grow and be taught primarily to children, instead of being integrated with American culture and language.

=== Environmental sustainability ===
In both the indigenous populations of today and the works of speculative fiction, each individual community member is often asked to take part in maintaining and sustaining the environment they are a part of. Nature is often viewed as a cycle akin to one's life and death, and thus individuals can contribute to the cycle they are a part of.

=== LGBTQ identities ===
==== Two-spirit ====
The term "Two-Spirit" is a modern, pan-Indian, umbrella term used by some Indigenous peoples to describe those who fulfill a third gender ceremonial and social role in their cultures. Those who identify themselves as two-spirit are neither a man nor woman, but can carry the traits of both sex represented in one complete body. The term was widely adopted in the 1990s to encompass the various non-binary gender identities and expressions among Indigenous peoples today.

==== Indigiqueer ====
Coined by Thirza Cuthand (Plains Cree) in 2004, the term Indigiqueer is used as an alternative to two-spirit that does not rely on binary concepts of gender. There are many indigenous futurisms stories written with indigiqueer themes, such as How to Survive the Apocalypse for Native Girls by two-spirit author Métis/Baawiting Nishnaane.

=== Concept of time ===
The concept of time in Indigenous futurisms moves away from Western linear interpretations, both culturally and within the genre of speculative fiction. According to Indigenous futurists, time encompasses and connects the past, present, and future all at once. Artists may explore alternate histories, distant and near futures, separate timelines, time travel, the multiverse, and other topics in which time is not limited to a linear conceptualization. Historical themes of colonialism, imperialism, genocide, conflict, the environment, trade, and treaties which have impacted Indigenous cultures, are recurring and reexamined to create new narratives. Artists play with questions of race, privilege, and "Whiteness", both in history and within the speculative genre; they are expanded upon, subverted, erased and reversed, amongst other things, thereby linking culture to time, space, and what lies in-between. The term biskaabiiyang (Anishinaabe), used by Dillon, exemplifies how Indigenous creators reflect on the impact of colonization by returning to their ancestral roots, conflating past with present and future, and reframing what the world would or could be like.

== In arts and entertainment ==
To increase this movement's visibility and bring attention to Indigenous voices, the Institute of American Indian Arts Museum of Contemporary Native Arts (IAIA MoCNA) showed Indigenous Futurisms: Transcending Past/Present/Future, featuring the works of 27 contemporary Indigenous artists. Following the pandemic, the MoCNA has transferred the collection to an online gallery and made available a VR experience that the public can access through their devices.

=== Visual arts ===
Many works of art by Indigenous futurists contain iconography or symbolism that reference Indigenous oral history. Another major facet of Indigenous futurists' artwork is the adaptation of existing culture and nomenclature. For instance, artist Bunky Echo-Hawk's “If Yoda was Indian” displays show a new perspective on Yoda from the franchise Star Wars.

Kristina Baudemann focuses on storytelling, art, and the integration of science fiction into Indigenous art in Indigenous Futurisms in North American Indigenous Art. She says that Indigenous people are resilient and sustainable and their art incorporates those characteristics.

Navajo artist Ryan Singer paints in acrylic and silk-screen prints. He has two pieces of Princess Leia, from the Star Wars series that portrays her as Hopi, acknowledging George Lucas' cultural appropriation of the Hopi butterfly whorl hairstyle. In his first painting, Hopi Princess Leia (2009), he shows the Hopi Princess Leia holding a gun pointing straight at the audience while also staring directly at the audience as well. In his second Hopi Princess Leia, named Hopi Princess Leia II (2010), Baudemann analyses this depiction and says it creates awareness of the colonial gaze, which is harmful to indigeneity. In these paintings, Princess Leia is seen clad in a Hopi blanket and wearing the hairstyle typical to unmarried Hopi girls. She is in front of her Pueblo homes, protecting them with her gun. Baudemann emphasizes the idea that Hopi homes should be seen as homes and not monuments that can be looked at by outsiders, and that they should not be appropriated. Princess Leia, in the Star Wars movies, loves her home and tries her hardest to protect it, which is why Singer chose Princess Leia to be depicted in these paintings.

Recent curatorial projects have also explored Indigenous Futurism as an emerging interpretive framework within contemporary Native art. Future Imaginaries: Indigenous Art, Fashion, Technology at the Autry Museum of the American West presents contemporary Indigenous artworks engaging with futurity, technology, and speculative visual traditions. Co-curated by Amber-Dawn Bear Robe (Siksika), Kristen Dorsey (Chickasaw), Suzanne Newman Fricke PhD, and Amy Scott PhD, the exhibition examines Indigenous sovereignty, survivance, and the reimagining of history through futurist and science-fiction frameworks.

The exhibition includes contributions from artists such as Wendy Red Star, whose work blends Indigenous cultural imagery with speculative or other-worldly settings, and Andy Everson, known for indigenising science-fiction iconography. Artists like Ryan Singer reinterpret pop-culture and science-fiction motifs through Diné perspectives, while multimedia installations by Virgil Ortiz—including ReVOlt 1680/2180: Sirens & Sikas—present futurist retellings of historical events such as the Pueblo Revolt. Ceramic works by Diego Romero incorporate narrative, satire, and historical reference to explore Indigenous continuity and cultural resilience, while textile installations by Marie Watt and photographic works by Cara Romero further highlight themes of representation, identity, and futurist aesthetics across diverse media.

=== Literature ===
Literature lends itself to many aspects of Indigenous Futurisms. Many stories revolving around Indigenous futurisms contain an Indigenous main character. However, these stories do not define the genre, as literature in Indigenous futurisms refer to authors or conceptualized stories as defined in Dillon's anthology. Literature is currently the most diverse subject in Indigenous futurisms. Joshua Whitehead compiled Love After the End, a collection of stories from queer Indigenous peoples tackling colonialism and the ideas of hope.

Scholarly works such as Knotting Ontologies, Beading Aesthetics, and Braiding Temporalities by Darren Lone Fight examine Native American literary epistemology and futurisms, and analyze Indigenous Star Wars phenomena.

=== Film ===
Indigenous futurisms in film reflect non-colonial encounters such as utopian sovereignty and dystopian assimilation. The continued development of Indigenous futurists' frameworks account for the diversity of creative efforts and histories between the First Nations, Inuit, and Native American filmmakers and communities to influence the outside world.

Some Indigenous futurists' films include:

- Wakening (2013 short film) by Danis Goulet
- The 6th World, FutureStates’ film short about Navajo people and Mars colonization by Nanobah Becker.
- The Northlander (2016 film)
- Night Raiders (2021), directed by Danis Goulet
- Rhymes for Young Ghouls (2013) and Blood Quantum (2019) by Jeff Barnaby

=== Board games ===
Indigenous futurisms also manifest themselves in physical games as well. Coyote and Crow is a tabletop role playing game created by Kenna Alexander, A native Cherokee who has had a large portion of her culture taken away from her by colonialism. The game is set in an America far in the future that has remained uncontacted by the Old World.

=== Digital media ===
An early source of collective Indigenous futurisms is on the CyberPowWow website, a site launched by Skawennati (Mohawk) for Indigenous art from 1997 to 2004. It was a precursor to her TimeTraveller™ Machinima series, which began with a 22nd-century Mohawk man.

==== Video games ====
While not as prominent as other mediums, video games provide a more hands-on approach to the teaching and display of Indigenous futurisms. Representation of indigenous cultures has been part of video games for years, with iconic games such as The Oregon Trail depicting Indigenous peoples. However, the specific genres of Indigenous futurisms in video games are relatively new concepts and few prominent games fall into these categories.

Indigenous futurists' games include:

- Thunderbird Strike, an action game in which players take on the form of a thunderbird, gathering lightning to destroy mining equipment and factories on a terrorized and barren earth. Thunderbird Strike features significant artistic components and lots of indigenous imagery. The creator of the game, Elizabeth LaPensée, calls the art style "Woodland" or "X-ray," after Anishinaabe artistic styles. The game offers a form of protest specifically against the oil industry.
- Never Alone, which tells the story of a Iñupiaq and an Arctic fox as they explore a dire atmosphere and experience the cosmology of the Alaska Natives for themselves.

Additionally, the popular game Fallout: New Vegas features a DLC titled Honest Hearts that showcases Indigenous culture in a dystopian future. Various tribes exist in the new region of Zion Canyon, and the connection to nature is showcased with rain and friendly dogs being introduced to Fallout: New Vegas for the first time.

There has been controversy surrounding representation of Native people in video games, and iconic games such as The Oregon Trail have depicted Indigenous cultures as dangerous and violent. The development teams of many new video games have begun hiring consultants from Native communities to ensure accurate representation, with the popular video game Assassin's Creed III collaborating on the game with the Mohawk Nation. A recent Indigenous futurist's game, Terra Nova, was produced by Maize Longboat, a member of the Mohawk tribe, and many other indigenous people have been engaging in the production of video games centered around indigenous themes.

==== Virtual reality ====
Indigenous producers influence the culture of technology through virtual reality to properly represent Indigenous people and their culture. The digital media field and digital technology industries are currently dominated by white media creators. Indigenous Matriarch 4 is a virtual reality company that provides Indigenous people with resources to help them participate in and remake the virtual world. Because Indigenous people are often misrepresented in media, VR has become a place to creatively express Native American culture and ideas. Indigenous VR has also provided Indigenous people with the opportunity to be leaders in a new technology field, and to be involved in technology fields that previously excluded them and that had very little representation of Native American and Indigenous communities.

Virtual reality is being used to create space and capacity for Indigenous creatives to tell their stories. VR is used by many Indigenous practitioners to reimagine traditional storytelling and express themselves and their culture, promote health and wellbeing, and foster self-esteem and pride. New virtual platforms have also been created that retell significant moments in Indigenous history and connect to the present, like the platform AbTeC Island (Aboriginal Territories in Cyberspace).

The 2167VR Project (2017), in partnership with the Initiative for Indigenous Futures (TIIF), commissioned the works of many Indigenous artists such as Danis Goulet (Métis), Kent Monkman (Cree), Postcommodity and Scott Benesiinaabandan (Lac Seul First Nation), notable for his work Blueberry Pie Under a Martian Sky, an immersive project that exhibits virtual reality works set 150 years forward in time, paralleling Canada's 150th anniversary, which each offer a different perspective on the role that Indigenous peoples and identities may have in building the future.

== Related movements ==
The term Indigenous futurism, which has been called Indigenous futurisms since 2012, was used by Grace Dillon, a Portland State University professor of Indigenous Nations Studies. The term was inspired by Afrofuturism and Africanfuturism, all of which encapsulate multiple modes of art; from literature to visual arts, fashion, and music. One example of Indigenous futurism in media is Rabbit Chase, a graphic novel written by Elizabeth LaPensée and illustrated by KC Oster, which follows an Anishinaabe non-binary youth in a story inspired by Alice in Wonderland.

Indigenous futurisms are also connected to Chicanafuturism and Latinofuturism, "a spectrum of speculative aesthetics produced by U.S. Latin@s, including Chican@s, Puerto Ricans, Dominican Americans, Cuban Americans, and other Latin American immigrant populations. It also includes innovative cultural productions stemming from the hybrid and fluid borderlands spaces, including the U.S.-Mexico border."

== Criticism ==
Indigenous Futurisms, as a term, has received mixed feedback among Indigenous Brazilian musicians. Many Indigenous artists do not embrace this concept because they view preserving culture to be much more important than thinking about the future. For example, Indigenous rapper Kunumi MC, disagrees with the term, arguing that it is a white man's term unreflective of Indigenous people, saying: “We, native Indigenous people living in tribes, don't think about the future,” he says. “The white man has a vision of progress, not us. Our progress is to preserve our culture ... to live in the present, I have to remember my past.”

== List of Indigenous futurists ==
Artists working within the field of Indigenous futurisms include:

- A Tribe Called Red, musicians
- Barry Ace (Odawa) multimedia artist based in Sudbury
- KC Adams (Cree/Ojibway) multimedia artist based in Winnipeg
- Loren Aragon (Acoma Pueblo), fashion designer at Aconav
- Jason Baerg (Métis), multimedia artist
- Roy Boney, Jr. (Cherokee Nation), animator, illustrator, comic artist, painter
- Bunky Echo-Hawk (Yakama/Pawnee) multimedia artist
- Rosalie Favell (Métis) digital artist based in Ottawa
- Jason Garcia (Santa Clara Pueblo), ceramic artist, painter, printmaker
- Jeffrey Gibson, (Mississippi Choctaw/Cherokee), painter and sculptor
- Danis Goulet (Métis/Cree) filmmaker and screenwriter based in Toronto
- Silver Jackson, also Nicholas Galanin (Tlingit/Unangax̂), musician, multidisciplinary artist
- Cannupa Hanska Luger (Fort Berthold Mandan/Hidatsa/Arikara/Lakota), visual artist
- Stephen Graham Jones (Blackfeet), author
- Darcie Little Badger (Lipan Apache Tribe of Texas), author
- Jamie Okuma (Luiseño/Shoshone-Bannock) beadwork artist and fashion designer
- Virgil Ortiz (Cochiti) ceramic sculptor and designer
- Wendy Ponca (Osage), fashion designer, textile artist
- Wendy Red Star (Apsáalooke), installation artist, photographer
- Ryan Singer (Diné), painter
- Skawennati (Mohawk), multimedia artist best known for her project TimeTraveller
- Snotty Nose Rez Kids (Haisla), hip hop musicians
- Loretta Todd (Cree/Métis), filmmaker who runs IM4, the Indigenous Matriarchs 4 XR Media Lab;
- Will Wilson (Diné), photographer
- Cara Romero photographer

== See also ==
- CyberPowWow
- Indigenous people in video gaming
- Never Alone
- Thunderbird Strike
