= Latino Futurism =

Latino speculative fiction movement

Latinofuturism (also known as Latinx/Latine Futurism or Latino Futurism) is a literary, artistic, and cultural movement that reimagines Latino experiences through speculative fiction and futurist aesthetics. The movement encompasses cultural productions by Chicanos, Puerto Ricans, Dominican Americans, Cuban Americans, and other Latin American immigrant populations, particularly those emerging from borderland spaces.

Latinofuturism centers Latino voices in visions of the future where Spanish, indigenous languages, and bilingualism persist alongside advanced technology. The movement imagines technological innovation rooted in ancestral knowledge and collective survival strategies.

== History ==
The term builds upon Chicanafuturism, coined by scholar Catherine S. Ramírez in 2004 in her article "Deus ex Machina: Tradition, Technology, and the Chicanafuturist Art of Marion C. Martinez" in Aztlán: A Journal of Chicano Studies. Ramírez examined how Chicana artist Marion C. Martinez incorporated discarded computer components, including circuit boards, wire, ribbon cable, and CDs sourced in part from near Los Alamos National Laboratory, into mixed media sculptures and wall hangings depicting traditional Catholic iconography.

Academic recognition came with the 2017 publication of Altermundos: Latin@ Speculative Literature, Film, and Popular Culture, edited by Cathryn Josefina Merla-Watson and B.V. Olguín. The anthology received the 2018 American Book Award from the Before Columbus Foundation and placed first in the Best Cover Illustration category at the 2017 International Latino Book Awards. Writing in a publication of the Association for the Study of the Arts of the Present (ASAP), scholar Renee Hudson, while describing Altermundos as a foundational anthology, has noted that it is dominated by Chicanx authors and often neglects other Latinx voices in its discussion of Latinx speculative fiction.

In 2022, the Smithsonian Institution's National Air and Space Museum launched "Estrellas y Cuentos: A Latinofuturism Oral History Project," documenting the intersection of Latino communities and space exploration through recorded interviews with writers, artists, and cultural figures. The following year, the museum's AeroEspacial podcast dedicated an episode to Latino Futurism, exploring science fiction and space exploration from Latino cultural perspectives.

== Characteristics ==
=== Temporal structures ===
Latinofuturist works employ non-linear temporal structures derived from circular time concepts in Mesoamerican cultures. Past, present, and future are presented as interconnected layers where ancestral knowledge informs technological innovation.

=== Rasquachismo ===
The movement employs rasquachismo, a working-class Chicana/o aesthetic of creative resourcefulness. This manifests in characters who create technology from salvaged materials, informal economies that persist into the future, and DIY approaches to scientific discovery.

=== Theoretical influences ===
The movement draws from José Esteban Muñoz's concept of "queer futurity," which scholars identify as a key framework for Latino speculative fiction. Latinofuturist works create "altermundos" (alternative worlds) that address labor, migration, and globalization effects on borderlands communities.

=== Social and political struggles ===
People who create art or literature may include themes that relates to political ideologies and social movements that impacts Latino communities. They may mention subjects of imperialism, colonialism and racism while interpreting narratives about Latino's possible, alternative, or futuristic timelines.

== Themes ==
=== Migration and border crossing ===
Migration functions as a central metaphor in Latinofuturist works, with borders reimagined as technological interfaces, temporal boundaries, or spaces of transformation. Characters frequently navigate between worlds, whether physical borders, digital realms, or temporal dimensions.

=== Labor and technology ===
The movement addresses the relationship between Latino workers and technology, from maquiladora labor to virtual work. Works like Lunar Braceros extend historical labor patterns into futuristic contexts, examining how exploitation persists across technological advancement.

=== Outness ===
As an artistic way to portray identity, artists and activists use cultural objects or concepts to counter ideologies that impedes progress and opposes Latino, Black and indigenous cultures.

=== Hybrid identities ===
Latinofuturism explores hybrid identities through technological and cultural fusion. Ken Gonzales-Day's 2001 concept of "Choloborg" combines cholo identity with Donna Haraway's cyborg theory to reclaim marginalized identities through technology. Erica Gressman also touches into hybridization on both her Brown skin and her queerness with a suit, electronics and noise in her performance Wall of Skin (2016).These hybrid figures challenge boundaries between human and machine, traditional and futuristic.

=== Environmental futures ===
Many Latinofuturist works address environmental justice and climate change through narratives that connect local environmental struggles with global climate systems. These stories feature water scarcity, climate migration, water rights activism, and renewable energy innovations rooted in traditional ecological knowledge and indigenous agricultural practices. Works explore how communities develop both technological and spiritual solutions to ecological crises, often imagining futures where ancestral knowledge informs climate adaptation strategies. Early Chicanafuturist works like Marion C. Martinez's art highlighted these themes by incorporating discarded computer parts to expose regions' histories as dumping grounds for technological waste and environmental injustice.

=== Language and cultural preservation ===
The persistence of Spanish, indigenous languages, and code-switching in futuristic settings represents resistance to cultural erasure. Multilingualism functions as both survival strategy and technological advantage in these narratives. ADÁL and Pedro Pietri present persistence in the poetic and visually artistic project "Out of Focus Nuyoricans" (2004) to alternate and challenge the Nuyorican identity with Puerto Rican that has been under the lens of imperialism and colonialism in the United States.

=== Decolonial temporalities ===
Latinofuturist works reject linear Western time, employing Mesoamerican circular time concepts where past, present, and future coexist. Ancestors appear as active participants in future scenarios, and pre-Columbian technologies resurface in advanced forms.

== Literature ==
Ernest Hogan's 1999 novel Smoking Mirror Blues depicts a futuristic East Los Angeles where Aztec deities manifest through advanced technology. The protagonist, a lowrider mechanic, discovers his car modifications channel Tezcatlipoca.

Rosaura Sánchez and Beatrice Pita's Lunar Braceros 2125-2148 imagines Mexican workers traveling to lunar mining colonies, extending the historical Bracero Program into space. The novella addresses labor exploitation and immigration policy through science fiction.

Michael Zapata's debut novel The Lost Book of Adana Moreau (2020) follows a Dominican immigrant in New Orleans who writes science fiction at the turn of the century and destroys her last manuscript before she dies, only for it to resurface decades later. The novel has been described as a crucial work in the Latinofuturism movement. In 2025, Zapata won the inaugural DAG Prize for Literature in support of his forthcoming novel The Census Taker, a speculative noir set in Chicago's future that its author has described as "a love letter to Latinofuturism, indigenous scientists, and revolutionaries."

Pedro Iniguez's Mexicans on the Moon (2024) is a collection of 50 speculative poems that cover topics such as the exploration of space and time travel from a Latino perspective.

== Visual arts ==
Marion C. Martinez creates mixed media sculptures and wall hangings incorporating discarded computer components, including circuit boards, wire, ribbon cable, and CDs sourced in part from near Los Alamos National Laboratory, into traditional Catholic iconographic forms. Among her best-known works is Corazon de Guadalupe, a depiction of the Virgin of Guadalupe constructed from recycled circuit boards and other discarded computer parts. Her AzTechna series combines cultural legends with contemporary technological materials.

Contemporary artist Cayetano Valenzuela paints Latino children as space explorers and inventors. His 2023 series "Future Ancestros" features young protagonists in space suits decorated with Mesoamerican-style designs, and Mexican cultural figures like La Virgen de Guadalupe.

In 2022, Ken Gonzales-Day created public installations combining ancient Mesoamerican figures with digital manipulation. His work for the LA Metro stations features objects from LACMA's collection transformed through digital technology, creating what he describes as "portals" between past and future.

There were also events and exhibitions that presented visual concepts. Mundos Alternos: Art and Science Fiction in the Americas (2019) was an exhibition done in the Queens Museum in New York that inclued artwork made by contemporary Latino artists. The artwork portrayed alternative worlds or concepts based on Latino experiences and identities in order to theorize the future of immigrants in the United States. One of the artworks are in this Exhibition was ADÁL’s “Coconauts in Space" (2016), an altered photograph showing the first moon landing with a Puerto Rican flag.

== Performance and music ==
Gressman’s Wall of Skin (2016) is a visual performance where she wears a full-body white suit that covers every part of her skin. The suit simulates as a cybernetic or cyborgian suit that is meant to cloak her Brown skin. Using the layers of the suit that symbolizes layers of her identity, she is described as "post-human".

David Hernández and Dean Karabatsos shows outness in their record David Hernández and Street Sounds, using Hernández' poems by improvising with traditional music from Afro-Cuban, Black American and indigenous cultures, composed of different techniques and engaging sessions known as "descarga". Some of the poems, such as Hernández' "1951: Puerto Rico" are dedicated to life experiences in Chicago while also emphasizing the hopeful future for Puerto Ricans and other Latinos.

== Comics and graphic narratives ==
Zeke Peña is a Xicano cartoonist whose work reimagines border history and ecology through speculative fiction. His comic project Funkterra is an eco-science fiction narrative set in a parallel version of the Paso del Norte region, depicting the Rio Grande and communities along it in a speculative future shaped by climate change and border politics. Peña has described the project as growing out of oral history work with border communities about their relationship to the river.

== Film ==
Director Alex Rivera's Sleep Dealer (2008) imagines futures where globalization and technology reshape Latino labor and migration patterns. The film features cyberpunk elements addressing maquiladora labor and virtual reality work.

== Recognition ==
The Library of Congress officially recognizes Latinx Futurism as a distinct literary movement related to Afrofuturism and Indigenous Futurisms, situating it within its Hispanic Reading Room research collections as a contemporary speculative tradition of growing scholarly significance.

In 2023, La Casita Cultural Center at Syracuse University hosted "Futurismo Latino – Cultural Memory and Imagined Worlds."

== Relationship to other movements ==
=== Afrofuturism ===
Latinofuturism shares with Afrofuturism concerns about imagining futures for marginalized communities, but emphasizes themes of language preservation, border crossing, and environmental migration. While Afrofuturism foregrounds the African diaspora and the legacy of slavery, Latinofuturism focuses on migrations within and across the Americas.

Afrofuturism often explores space travel as an escape from earthly oppression. Latinofuturism more frequently imagines technological solutions to terrestrial problems like water scarcity and climate adaptation. Isabel Millán argues the movements "become tightly knit when considering Afro-Latina/o speculative productions." Renee Hudson similarly points to Leticia Alvarado's reading of Dominican-born artist Firelei Báez's Ciguapa series (2005–2015) as work that sutures together Afrofuturism and Latinx futurism within an archipelagic framework, arguing that a more inclusive latinidad must center the experiences of Black and Indigenous Latino/xs.

=== Indigenous Futurisms ===
Both Latinofuturism and Indigenous Futurisms challenge linear Western concepts of time and emphasize traditional ecological knowledge. Indigenous Futurisms, coined by Anishinaabe scholar Grace L. Dillon, involves "biskaabiiyang" (an Anishinaabemowin word meaning "returning to ourselves").

According to Dillon, this involves "discovering how personally one is affected by colonization, discarding the emotional and psychological baggage carried from its impact, and recovering ancestral traditions in order to adapt in our post-Native Apocalypse world."

For the Māori, time concepts "are interconnected, interdependent and complex, with multi-layered and multi-faceted dimensions." Indigenous African approaches similarly emphasize circular rather than linear temporalities. Latinofuturism deploys Mesoamerican circular time concepts in similar ways.

Latinofuturism employs Indigenous multi-layered and complex concepts of time, understood by its often Indigenous, multiracial, multiethnic, and mestizo audience.

== See also ==
- Afrofuturism
- Border art
- Chicanafuturism
- Chicano literature
- Gloria Anzaldúa: Borderlands/La Frontera
- Indigenous Futurisms
- Latino science fiction
- Magical realism
