= Barry Ace =

Canadian First Nations artist and curator (born 1958)

- Born: 1958 (age 67–68); Sudbury, Ontario
- Citizenship: M'Chigeeng First Nation and Canada
- Education: Cambrian College
- Known for: sculptor, installation artist, and curator
- Awards: King Charles III Coronation Medal (2025)
- Website: barryacearts.com

Barry Ace (born 1958) is a First Nations sculptor, installation artist, photographer, multimedia artist, and curator from Sudbury, Ontario, who lives in Ottawa. He is Odawa, an Anishinaabe people, and belongs to the M'Chigeeng First Nation.

Ace's work includes mixed media-paintings, and mixed media textile and sculptural work that combines traditional Anishinaabe textiles and beadwork with found electrical components. Ace has a strong interest in combining Indigenous and global technologies, aesthetics, and techniques in his artwork.

== Early life ==
Barry Ace was born in Sudbury, Ontario. He is a band member of M'Chigeeng First Nation, Manitoulin Island. Ace's surname is pronounced "Es" and translates to the Ojibwe word for "clam," also relating to the word for "small clam" spelled "esiins" or "esens." Ace's heritage links him to Chief Assance (alternatively spelled Aisance, Aissance, and Essens) of the Nigig (Otter) clan, the otter being an important messenger figure in Anishinaabe history. Ace was first introduced to techniques that he would later employ in his artistic practice at the age of seven or eight when he helped his great-aunt Annie Owl-McGregor to make Anishinaabe splint-ash baskets. He also found inspiration from the beadwork, quillwork, and basketry made by his grandmother Mary McGregor-Ace.

== Education ==
Barry Ace initially studied to be an electrician at Cambrian College but switched to graphic arts. Ace's background knowledge in electricity did however later play a role in his artwork in his mixed media works that include electrical components.

Ace has lectured at the University of Sudbury in the Indigenous Studies Program, and at Laurentian University, and Carleton University in Canadian Studies. In 2015 he taught a workshop at the Ottawa Art Gallery where participants made a collective mixed media map of the city of Ottawa. He also led a workshop for children from an Ojibwe immersion school in the fall of 2016 where the artwork produced by the children was later displayed at the Ojibwe Cultural Foundation. Ace is participating in the Nigig Visiting Artist Residency put on by the Indigenous Visual Culture Program at OCAD University in the winter of 2018.

== Themes ==
Much of Barry Ace's work uses found materials like capacitors, resistors, and light-emitting diodes, and traditional Great Lakes-style floral beadwork to comment on "cultural endurance undeterred by centuries of colonial oppression and rapid social change." In all of his creations, the artist emphasizes the importance of asserting one's identity and culture and taking ownership of Indigenous imagery and representation. Ace's work explores the relationship between historical techniques and traditions and contemporary materials and subject matter. By referencing the history of Anishinaabe textile art in works that use contemporary mass-produced materials, among other themes Ace investigates the dialogue between Indigenous and European cultures, much like fellow artists Rosalie Favell and Jeff Thomas do. One example of this is the history of the use of glass beads from European traders in Indigenous beadwork that Ace references in his textile pieces. Some of Ace's work explores the particular aesthetic of technology and popular culture in Indigenous art, something that fellow artist Rosalie Favell also incorporates in her work.

In 2010, Ace performed A Reparative Act, a performance of four solo dances in the traditional Woodland style in Paris referencing the nineteenth-century dance performances of Chief Maungwadaus in Britain and Continental Europe. Ace's performance and essay was part of Robert Houle's Paris/Ojibwa research project which opened at the Canadian Cultural Centre in Paris.

== Selected exhibitions ==
Barry Ace was featured in Emergence from the Shadows: First Peoples Photographic Perspectives (1996) held at the Canadian Museum of History and curated by Jeff Thomas. The exhibition involved six contemporary Indigenous photographers addressing representations of Indigenous culture through their engagement with and display of their work alongside historical photographs from the museum, including portraiture. The artists that Ace exhibited with were Mary Anne Barkhouse, Rosalie Favell, Greg Hill, Shelley Niro and Greg Staats.

Some notable exhibitions that Ace has been included in have been the In/Digitized – Indigenous Culture in a Digital World (007 with Special Agent Robert Houle) at SAW Gallery (2013), Native Fashion Now: North American Indian Style at the Peabody Essex Museum (2016), Canadian Biennial at the National Gallery of Canada (2017), Memory Landscape at Museu Nogueira da Silva, Universidade do Minho (2016), Every.Now.Then: Reframing Nationhood at the Art Gallery of Ontario (2017), Always Vessels at Carleton University Art Gallery (2017), It's Complicated with 007 at Central Art Garage (2017), raise a flag: works from the Indigenous Art Collection (200–2015) at OCAD University (2017), Insurgence/Resurgence at the Winnipeg Art Gallery (2018), and Radical Stitch at the MacKenzie Art Gallery (2022).

Barry Ace's artwork has been exhibited at galleries such as the National Gallery of Canada, including Abadakone in 2019, the Ottawa Art Gallery, Karsh-Masson Gallery, the Art Gallery of Southwestern Manitoba, Winnipeg Art Gallery, the Royal Ontario Museum, and the Canadian Museum of History. Ace's work has been collected by the Canada Council Art Bank, Woodland Cultural Centre, the Royal Ontario Museum, the Ottawa Art Gallery, Indigenous Affairs and Northern Development Canada, the National Gallery of Canada, Nordamerika Native Museum, the City of Ottawa, and Global Affairs Canada.

Ace has curated several shows himself, including A Celebration: The Art of Canada's First Peoples (Rideau Hall, Ottawa, 1996–1997), Perpetual Bundle (Hull, 1996), and inter/SECTION (Hull, 1998). He served as Chief Curator for the Aboriginal Art Centre, Aboriginal Affairs and Northern Development Canada from 1994 to 2000. Ace organized numerous exhibitions, including Transitions: Contemporary Canadian Indian and Inuit Art (1997), which toured internationally.

== Selected works ==
- 2006 Reaction – footwear
- 2010 A Reparative Act – performance
- 2013 Healing Dance 1 – painting
- 2013 Urban Bustle – mixed media
- 2014 Nigik Makizinan – Otter Moccasins
- 2016 Bandolier for M'Chigeeng – mixed media
- 2016 Nayaano-nibiimaang Gichigamiin: The Five Great Lakes – mixed media
- 2017 Bandolier for Alain Brosseau – mixed media

== Awards ==
In 2015, Barry Ace won the K.M. Hunter Artist Award for visual arts. Ace won the Ontario Association of Art Galleries' Curatorial Writing Award in 2012 for his essay "A Reparative Act," which was written for Robert Houle's Paris/Ojibwa exhibition catalogue. He also won the Deputy Minister's Outstanding Achievement Award with his team in 1999 for the artist-in-residence and exhibition program that they launched at Aboriginal Affairs and Northern Development Canada.

== Organizations and groups ==
With Ryan Rice, Ron Noganosh, and Ahasiw Maskegon-Iskew in 2006, Barry Ace co-founded the non-profit Indigenous Curatorial Collective (formerly the Aboriginal Curatorial Collective). Connecting Indigenous curators and cultural producers across Canada, the ACC has played an important role in gathering a strong Indigenous arts community and supporting curatorial and writing projects that share the many voices that make up that community.

Barry Ace also co-founded the OO7 (Ottawa Ontario Seven) Collective, a group of Indigenous artists that includes Ariel Smith, Rosalie Favell, Frank Shebageget, Leo Yerxa, Michael Belmore, Ron Noganosh, and invited "special agents." The group provides an alternative and experimental space for Ottawa-based Indigenous artists at different stages in their careers, and supports them by providing opportunities for self-curation, public engagement, and critique.
