= Rosalie Favell =

Canadian artist (born 1958)

- Born: 1958 (age 67–68); Winnipeg, Manitoba
- Citizenship: Métis and Canada
- Education: Ryerson Polytechnic Institute (BA, 1984),University of New Mexico (MFA, 1998), Cultural Mediations at Carleton University
- Known for: photographer

Rosalie Favell RCA (born 1958) is a Métis (Cree/British) artist from Winnipeg, Manitoba currently based in Ottawa, Ontario, working with photography and digital collage techniques. Favell creates self-portraits, sometimes featuring her own image and other times featuring imagery that represents her, often making use of archival photos of family members and images from pop culture.

== Early life ==
Rosalie Favell was born in 1958 to a Métis father named Gerald, and a mother of Scottish/English descent named Florence McFadyen. She was raised in an Anglican household where the family's ancestry was not openly discussed. Receiving her first camera at age ten, Favell first formally explored her artistic impulse a number of years later at a night photography course which inspired her to continue learning the medium.

== Education ==
Favell completed a bachelor of applied arts at Ryerson Polytechnic Institute in 1984, a master of fine arts at the University of New Mexico in 1998, and a PhD studies (ABD) in Cultural Mediations at Carleton University in 2009. In the late 1990s, when she was making a shift from documentary photography to digital photo manipulations, Favell learned from fellow artist Larry Glawson.

Rosalie Favell has taught many courses and workshops throughout her career. She has taught courses at the University of Manitoba (98-99), the Institute of American Indian Art Santa-Fe, (94-95), Carleton University, and the University of Ottawa, to name a few. Favell has also taught digital photography at Discovery University since 2013, a program run jointly by The Ottawa Mission and the University of Ottawa to offer people of low-income situations educational opportunities. Favell has done several residencies as well, including residencies at the Banff Centre, and the Nigig Visiting Artist Residency at OCAD University, where she presented the work Facing the Camera (2008-ongoing) that consisted of a series of portraits of members of the Indigenous arts community.

== Involvement in organizations ==
Favell was an early member of the NIIPA (Native Indian/Inuit Photographers’ Association) in Hamilton, the first artist-run centre specializing in photo-based artwork by Indigenous artists in Canada. She was a board member at the Floating Gallery Centre for Photography in Winnipeg and the Original Women's Network: a Native Women's Resource Centre. Favell has also worked with Nepalese women's groups in Katmandu.

== Themes ==
A prominent and ongoing theme in Favell's work is self-portraiture. Favell often references the traditions of portraiture and self-portraiture, using traditional composition or even existing portraits, and replacing the historical sitter with herself. An example of this is Favell's The Artist in Her Museum: The Collector (2005) that references Charles Wilson Peale's self-portrait displaying his collection, The Artist in His Museum (1822). In Favell's work she replaces the collector with her own image and the collection of specimens with her family photos, and in doing so questions and overwrites the colonial practice of collection and display. In her photo manipulations, Favell re-contextualizes specific portraits and the portrait tradition on a whole, often introducing her own Indigenous identity to create a dialogue. Fellow artist and writer Barry Ace summarizes Favell's approach by stating:

“The collected images act as an aide-memoire, igniting personal and collective memory, while photo-digital practice provides her with an expansive tableau for visual expressions of self, family, identity and sexuality.”

Favell has also created many works using documentary photography to create an image of the Indigenous community that she is a part of. Works such as Portraits in Blood (1980s) use photographic portraits of Indigenous artists and friends to express and document Favell's own navigation of Indigenous identity. Her ongoing Facing the Camera series, which began in 2008, consists of dynamic photographic portraits of roughly 450 Indigenous artists from across the globe including Daphne Odjig, Greg Hill, Bear Witness of A Tribe Called Red, Caroline Monnet, Heather Igloliorte, Kent Monkman, Mary Watt, Maree Clarke, Alex Janvier, and Mary Anne Barkhouse. The active poses that Favell captures in Facing the Camera lend agency to the sitters and call into question stereotypes created in part by a history of portraiture of Indigenous people from a colonial perspective.

== Awards ==
Favell has received recognition and support for her work through several awards and grants throughout her career. Favell was awarded the biennial Karsh Award in 2012 in recognition of her extensive body of photographic work, the Ontario Arts Council Chalmers Arts Fellowship in 2004, and the Canada Council for the Arts Victor Martyn Lynch-Staunton Award in 2003, to name a few. In 2017, Favell was awarded The Paul de Hueck and Norman Walford Career Achievement Award for Art Photography.

== Works ==
=== Exhibited and collected works ===
Favell's work has been exhibited at and collected by the National Gallery of Canada, the Canadian Museum of Contemporary Photography, Library and Archives Canada, the Ottawa Art Gallery, Karsh-Masson Gallery, Cube Gallery, the Smithsonian National Museum of the American Indian, and the Rockwell Museum of Western Art. An exhibition at the Canadian Museum of Contemporary Photography (National Gallery of Canada) called Steeling the Gaze: Portraits by Aboriginal Artists that challenged stereotypical portrayals of Indigenous people through portraiture featured Favell's work. Her portraits appeared alongside the work of other Indigenous artists such as KC Adams, Carl Beam, Dana Claxton, Thirza Cuthand, Kent Monkman, David Neel, Shelley Niro, Greg Staats, Jeff Thomas, and Bear Witness.

=== Group exhibitions ===
- 2013: Steeling the Gaze: Portraits by Aboriginal Artists, Mendel Art Gallery, Saskatoon, SK
- 2019: Hearts of Our People: Native Women Artists, Minneapolis Institute of Art, Minneapolis, MN

=== Selected works ===
- 1994 Living Evidence
- 1980s Portraits in Blood
- 1998 Longing and Not Belonging
- 2005 The Artist in Her Museum: The Collector
- 1999-2006 Plain(s) Warrior Artist
- 2010 Wish You Were Here
- 2008-ongoing Facing the Camera

=== Collaborative projects and groups ===
In 2017, Rosalie Favell organized a collaborative project called Wrapped in Culture which involved Indigenous artists from Canada: Favell herself, Barry Ace (Anishinaabe-Odawa), Meryl McMaster (Cree) and Adrian Stimson (Siksika-Blackfoot), and from Australia: Maree Clarke (Mutti Mutti, Yorta Yorta, Boon Wurrung), Vicki West (Tasmanian), Mitch Mahoney (Boon Wurrung, Barkindji), Molly Mahoney (Boon Wurrung, Barkindji), Kerri Clarke (Boon Wurrung), and Wade Mahoney (Barkindji). The ten artists created a traditional Blackfoot buffalo robe and an Australian Aboriginal possum skin cloak at workshops spanning a few weeks. The robes were incised and painted with designs in an act of storytelling, reclamation, and community building.

Rosalie Favell is part of the OO7 (Ottawa Ontario Seven) Collective, a group of Indigenous artists that includes Ariel Smith, Barry Ace, Frank Shebageget, Leo Yerxa, Michael Belmore, Ron Noganosh, and invited “special agents.” The group provides an alternative and experimental space for Ottawa-based Indigenous artists at different stages in their careers.
