= Ryan Singer =

American painter

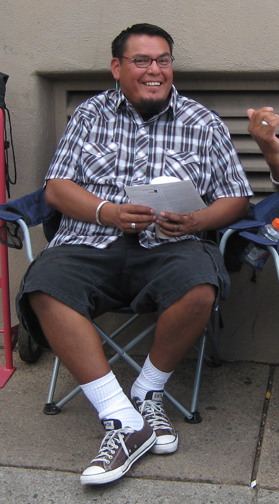
- Singer in 2008
- Born: August 24, 1973 (age 52); Cedar City, Utah, U.S.
- Education: BFA Arizona State University
- Known for: Painting, drawing, screen printing
- Movement: Indigenous Futurisms, Native Pop
- Website: ryansingerart.com

Ryan Singer (born August 24, 1973) is a Navajo contemporary painter living in Albuquerque, New Mexico. He is of the Tódich'íinii clan, born for Kinyaa'áani. Singer is known for his vibrant Pop Art-inspired takes on Native American and mainstream culture.

As far back as I can remember I have always loved art—drawing, painting, making music. What I like most about it is the freedom to create something—anything—from nothing. – Ryan Singer, 2009

== Background ==
The best thing for a kid is encouragement. My mother always got me art supplies and encouraged me. I think that was all it took. –Ryan Singer, 2009

Born in Cedar City, Utah, Singer grew up on the Navajo Nation. His hometown was Tuba City, Arizona . As a child Singer gained inspiration from comic books and watching his uncle Ed Singer painting in his studio. In the summers he attended Navajo sheep camp, where he was taught to understand the Navajo language despite not being a fluent speaker.

At the age of 10, Singer studied art books and familiarized himself with not only Western artists but also Navajo artists like Shonto Begay and Bahe Whitethorne Sr. He also became interested in Surrealist artists such as Salvador Dalí.

Singer, as a youth, became engrossed in punk rock culture and immersing himself in zines, skateboarding, and hardcore punk. After graduating from high school in Window Rock, Arizona, in 1992, he entered Northern Arizona University. There he studied forestry, inspired by his interests in the outdoors and environmentalism. This led to him working for the United States Forest Service for five years, when he left disappointed with the red tape of the US federal government. In 2004, he entered Arizona State University majoring in fine arts and eventually became a full-time artist.

=== Current ===
When not creating art, Singer works as art handler, graphic designer, and mentor for emerging artists. In 2010 he co-founded Native Artists For HOPE, a grassroots organization that provides mentoring, workshops and artistic empowerment to young Native American youth. Singer currently lives and works in Albuquerque, New Mexico, with his wife, Nathania Tsosie, who runs his website and online sales. His work is represented by a number of private galleries.

== Art career ==
Ryan Singer's painting Generations on the cover of Native Peoples Magazine

I don't like to conform. That's what art is about—freedom. That's what being an artist is. The most important thing: Speak your own truth. – Ryan Singer, 2010

Singer pulls from two major sources for his influences: popular culture and elements of Navajo culture. Influences of comic books, record album covers, and science fiction are combined with a Pop Art sensibility in a movement called Indigenous Futurisms. He also cites the visual appeal and stories of Star Wars and classic films and television programs such as Star Trek, Godzilla, Flash Gordon and black-and-white horror films. He is also known for his detailed portraits – ranging from Marilyn Monroe wearing a Navajo blanket to Boba Fett with a coyote.

=== Early work ===
Singer's first completed painting was at the age of 16; a self-portrait with him wearing a Batman T-shirt and his head wrapped up like a mummy. Upon returning to college he was offered two major opportunities: a commission to create illustrations for a book published by Salina Bookshelf and a museum exhibition.

=== Major works ===
==== Wagon Burner ====
In early 2000 Singer had a vision: "About 10, 15 minutes before going to sleep, I was dreaming with my eyes open.... I could see myself driving on the side of a cliff and I saw the sign. I sketched it out and went to sleep." This experience would lead to one of Singer's most well-known images Wagon-burner; a yellow road sign that depicts a covered wagon with flames in the back of it, rolling down a hill. It is a pop art response to the wagon trains that littered the Old American West as they traveled through Navajo and other Native American lands.

==== Mutton Stew ====
A tribute to Andy Warhol, Sheep Is Good Food takes Warhol's iconic Campbell Soup can screen print and combines it with a Navajo twist. The Campbell Soup can is turned into a can of mutton stew and instead of the Campbell gold seal, Singer placed an image of a sheep being lassoed. The image has become one of Singer's most popular, landing the cover of the Phoenix New Times in 2010. The original is housed at the Heard Museum.

== Notable collections ==
- Heard Museum, Phoenix, AZ
- Navajo Nation Museum, Window Rock, AZ
- The Heritage Center at Red Cloud Indian School, Pine Ridge, SD

== Notable exhibitions ==
- 2020: Indigenous Futurisms: Transcending Past / Present / Future, Museum of Contemporary Native American Art, Santa Fe, New Mexico
- 2012: Low-Rez: Native American Lowbrow Art, Eggman and Walrus Art Emporium, Santa Fe, New Mexico
- 2010: Pop!: Popular Culture in Native American Art, Heard Museum, Phoenix AZ
- 2010: Transcending Traditions: Contemporary American Indian Artwork, Mesa Center for Contemporary Arts, Mesa, Arizona
- 2010: I Didn't Cross the Border; the Border crossed Me, Museum of Contemporary Native Art, Lloyd Kiva New Gallery, Santa Fe, New Mexico
- 2009: From Robots to Pin-ups: Artwork of Ryan Singer, University of New Mexico, Albuquerque, New Mexico

== Notable awards ==
- Cover Artist, 2010, Phoenix New Times
- Artist-in-Residence, 2009, Eiteljorg Museum of American Indians and Western Art
- Cover Artist, 2009, Native Peoples Magazine
- Adult Smile Award, 2008, Santa Fe Indian Market
- Judge's Choice, 2008, Heard Museum Indian Market
- Honorable Mention, 15th Annual West Valley Invitational Native American Arts Festival
- Honorable Mention, Heard Museum Indian Market
- 2nd Place in Painting, Drawing & Graphics, 57th Navajo Festival of Arts & Crafts
- Best in Division, 2005, Heard Museum Indian Market
