= Ruben Esparza =

American artist

Ruben Esparza (born 1962) is a queer Latin artist, activist, and independent curator.

== Background ==
Esparza was born in El Paso, Texas. His interest in art began in high school when he started to make collages using materials from libraries. He moved to Los Angeles, California, where he pursues most of his work.

Esparza's art focus on themes such as queer and Latinx histories to the horrors of colonization to specific sociopolitical agendas that promote brownness and queerness.

== Notable projects ==
• From the Archives to the Archives. This exhibition was a reproduction of LGBTQ protest signs from the late twentieth century.

• Orlando Shooting Tribute. This tribute was meant to bring community to the queer community. Esparza expressed that sentiment by writing the names of the victims with his own blood.

•Anti-President Trump Protest Series. The goal through the series was to promote Anti-Trump sentiments and to apply that to political action in the 2020 election.

•Queer Biennial. Esparza founded the Queer Biennial in Los Angeles, which is a showcase that curates a variety of queer artists.
