= Angelina M. Lopez =

American romance author

- Occupation: Author
- Writing career
- Genre: Romance fiction

Angelina M. Lopez is an American romance author living in Houston, Texas.

Her Latinx book After Hours on Milagro Street was rated a top romance novel of 2022 by The Washington Post and Entertainment Weekly The novel treats the subjects of gentrification and cultural assimilation.

A story by Lopez was collected in Best Women's Erotica of the Year by Simon & Schuster in 2021.

She is from a Mexican American family from southeast Kansas. She discovered romance fiction as a child in a Kansas public library.
