= The Indigenous Curatorial Collective =

Canada-based fine arts organization

The Indigenous Curatorial Collective / Collectif des commissaires autochtones (IC/CA)
- Formation: March 14, 2006; 20 years ago
- Founded: March 14, 2006
- Founder: Cathy Mattes, Barry Ace, Ryan Rice, Ron Noganosh, and Âhasiw Maskêgon-Iskwêw
- Type: Non-Profit Arts Organization
- Purpose: Fine Arts, Critical Discourse, Critical Art Writing
- Headquarters: 280 Catherine Street Ottawa ON K1R 5T3
- Region served: Canada
- Method: Professional Development for Artists & Writers, Advocacy for Indigenous Fine Arts
- Board of directors: Reuben Friend - Co-Chair, Lori Beavis - Treasurer, and Maia Nuku - Secretary
- Key people: Liz Barron - Director of Operations & Eli Hurtle - Director of Programming
- Website: icca.art

The Indigenous Curatorial Collective / Collectif des commissaires autochtones (IC/CA) (formerly The Aboriginal Curatorial Collective / Collectif des commissaires autochtones (ACC-CCA)) is a Canadian-based Indigenous run and led non-profit fine arts organization. ICCA provides professional development opportunities to the Indigenous peoples in Canada which include the First Nations, Inuit, and Métis artists and curators.

== History ==
Established by Cathy Mattes, Barry Ace, Ryan Rice, Ron Noganosh and Âhasiw Maskêgon-Iskwêw as a not-for-profit organization in 2006, the Collective's mandate is dedicated to increasing the public profile of Indigenous art curators and their role in protecting, fostering and extending Indigenous arts and culture throughout North America.

The Indigenous Curatorial Collective supports its mandate through sponsorship of an annual conference and other professional networking opportunities, including lectures and exhibitions. Caucuses are the main instrument through which members participate in the direction of the (IC/CA). Many of the central activities of the (IC/CA) will be determined by the priorities, participation and energy of caucuses. There is an extensive list of objects of the corporation. The establishment of caucuses by members around these objects will help determine their priority for (IC/CA) action. There are also other Indigenous curatorial community issues that caucuses will address and that the (IC/CA) will put resources behind. Prominent Indigenous artists who belong to the Collective include Robert Houle, Greg A. Hill, Jaimie Isaac, and Cheryl L'Hirondelle.
