= Jaimie Isaac =

Canadian artist

Jamie Isaac
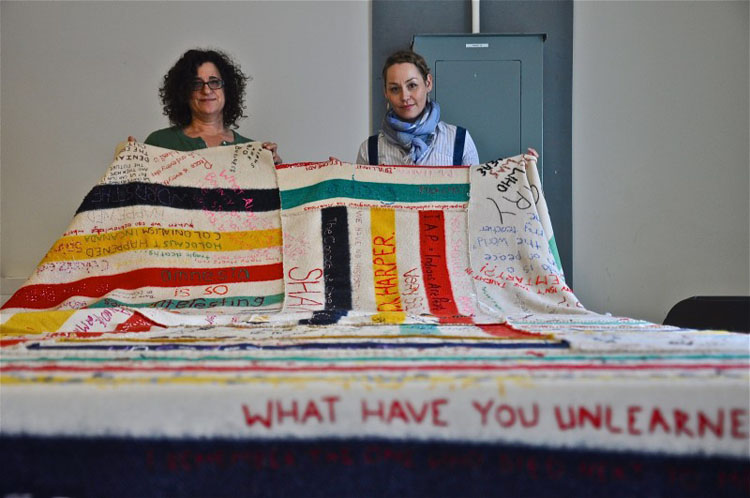
- Jaimie Isaac and Leah Decter with '(official denial) trade value in progress' at 180 Projects
- Citizenship: Sagkeeng First Nation and Canadian
- Website: jaimie-isaac.ca

Jaimie Isaac is a Winnipeg-based Anishinaabe artist and curator.

== Early life and education ==
Isaac is of Ojibway and British descent and is a member of Sagkeeng First Nation. She holds a master's degree from the University of British Columbia and a BA in art history with an Arts and Cultural Management Certificate from the University of Winnipeg. Her Masters of Arts thesis was titled, "Decolonizing curatorial practice: acknowledging Indigenous cultural praxis, mapping its agency, recognizing its aesthetic within contemporary Canadian art."

== Career ==
Jamie is a founding member of The Ephemerals Collective, an all-female Indigenous arts collective based out of Winnipeg. She has sat on the boards of numerous Canadian art organizations including the Aboriginal Curatorial Collective and the Aboriginal Manitoba Music association.

In 2010, Isaac was employed as the visual arts coordinator for the Truth and Reconciliation Commission of Canada. In 2016, Isaac was co-faculty with artist Duane Linklater at the Summer Institute of the Wood Land School at Plug In Institute.

From 2015 to 2017, Isaac served as the Winnipeg Art Gallery's Aboriginal Curatorial Resident, a position funded by the Canada Council for the Arts.

In 2017, Isaac was hired as Curator of Indigenous and Contemporary Art at the Winnipeg Art Gallery. In 2021, she was appointed chief curator at the Art Gallery of Greater Victoria.

In 2018, she co-curated the exhibition INSURGENCE/RESURGENCE with art historian Julie Nagam. This was the Winnipeg Art Gallery’s largest ever exhibition of contemporary Indigenous art featuring works by 29 artists.

== Work ==
=== Writing ===
- "Reflections on Unsettling Narratives of Denial" in The Land We Are Now: Writers and Artists Unsettle the Politics of Reconciliation (Winnipeg: ARP Books, 2015).
- "In Dialogue: Scott Benesiinaabandan's waabana’iwewin" in Public 54: Indigenous Art: New Media and the Digital, 2016.
- With Leach Decter, "(official denial) trade value in progress: Unsettling Narratives" in Reconcile This! (West Coast Line 71, no. 2, 2012).

=== Exhibitions ===
- Co-curator, Confluence, ROSEMARY Gallery, 2024
- Curated with Mel Granley, Symbiosis, Art Gallery of Greater Victoria, 2023
- Curated with Julie Nagam, Insurgence/Resurgence, Winnipeg Art Gallery, 2017-2018
- Vernon Ah Kee: cantchant, Winnipeg Art Gallery
- Curator, Border X, Winnipeg Art Gallery, 2016.
- Curator, We Are On Treaty Land, Winnipeg Art Gallery, 2015-2016.
- Quiyuktchigaewin; Making Good, Winnipeg Art Gallery
- With Leah Decter, official denial (trade value in progress), travelling participatory art project, across Canada, 2011-2015.
- Creator, Burning an Effigy, film, 2014.

=== Awards and nominations ===
- Recipient, Making a Difference Award, Winnipeg Arts Council, 2025.
- Recipient, Distinguished Alumni Award, University of Winnipeg, 2025.
- Canada Council for the Art's Indigenous delegation, Venice Biennale, 2017.
- Finalist, Making a Difference Award, Winnipeg Arts Council, 2017.
