= Julie Nagam =

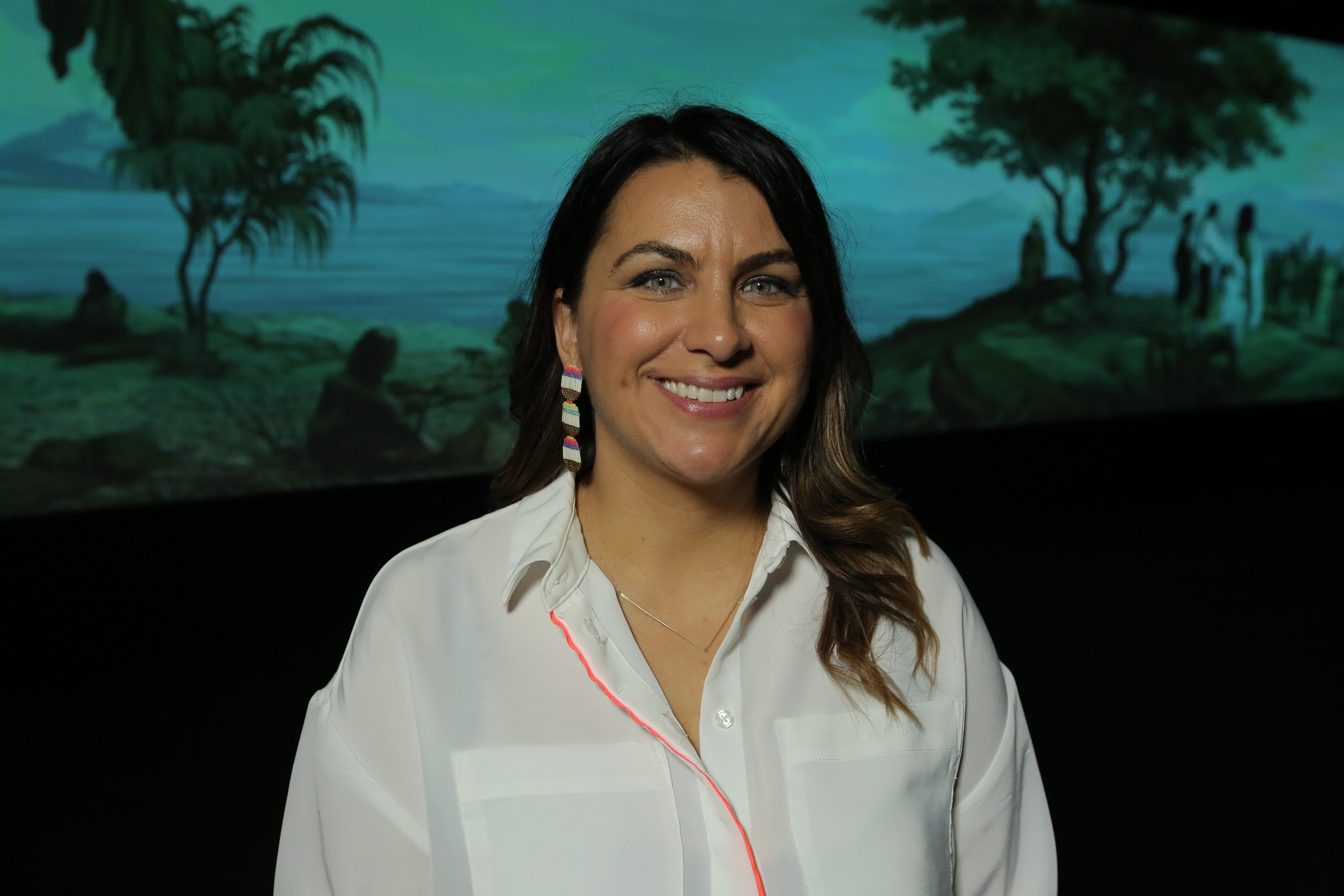
- Education: York University, Toronto, Ontario; University of Manitoba, Winnipeg, Manitoba
- Occupations: Associate Professor, Department of Art History, University of Winnipeg (2015-); Assistant Professor, Indigenous Visual Culture Program, OCAD (2009-2015).
- Title: Canada Research Chair in Indigenous Arts, Collaboration and Digital Media
- Website: https://glamcollective.ca https://aabijijiwanmedialab.ca

Julie Nagam is a scholar, artist, and curator based in Winnipeg, Canada.

== Education ==
Nagam received a PhD in Social and Political Thought from York University. Her thesis “Alternative Cartographies: Grafting a New Route for Indigenous Stories of Place” was published in 2011.

== Career ==
Nagam's academic career began in 2009 at OCAD University where she worked as an assistant professor in Indigenous visual culture. In 2015, Nagam accepted a position as associate professor in the Department of History at the University of Winnipeg. Between 2015 and 2019, Nagam was the Research Chair of Indigenous Arts of North America, jointly appointed by the Winnipeg Art Gallery and the University of Winnipeg.[multiple citations needed] In 2019 Nagam was awarded a Canada Research Chair in Indigenous Arts, Collaboration and Digital Media. Nagam was the director of the Aabijijiwan New Media Lab and the co-director of the Kishaadigeh Collaborative Research Centre. She has been an adjunct faculty member at York University, University of Manitoba, and OCAD University. She was a scholar in residence at Concordia University and Massey University.[citations needed]

=== Controversy ===
Nagam has claimed Métis heritage but the Winnipeg Free Press and Hamilton Spectator (along with other national media outlets) challenged her claim, and the $18m she raised to represent herself as a leader of Indigenous projects, in August 2024. Former students and colleagues reported the harm this caused to them and to their Indigenous cultures in the Brandon Sun.

=== Research activities ===
In 2020–2021, Nagam became Nuit Blanche Toronto’s inaugural Artistic Director presenting "The space between us: Collaborations within Indigenous, Circumpolar and Pacific places through digital media", funded by the Social Sciences and Humanities Research Council. The theme "focuses on the connections across urban, polar and pacific landscapes revealing the space between us as a potential site for sharing knowledges."

=== Edited journals, books and catalogues ===
- Nagam, Julie, Carly Lane, and Megan Tamati-Quenell, eds. Becoming Our Future: Global Indigenous Curatorial Practice. ARP Books, 2020
- Locating the Little Heartbeats. Julie Nagam solo exhibition. Winnipeg: Gallery C103, 2019. With a curatorial essay by Niigaan Sinclair
- the future is in the land. Julie Nagam solo exhibition. Toronto: A-Space Gallery, 2018. With a curatorial essay by Cheryl L’Hirondelle
- Nagam, Julie and Jaimie Issac, eds. INSURGENCE/RESURGENCE. Winnipeg: Winnipeg Art Gallery, 2017
- Nagam, Julie, Carla Taunton, and Heather Igloliorte, eds. PUBLIC Art, Culture, Ideas 54: Indigenous Art. Winter 2016

=== Articles and chapters ===
- Nagam, Julie and Carla Taunton. “Performing Memory: Embodied Interventions by Indigenous Women Artists.” In Insiders/Outsiders: The Cultural Politics and Ethics of Indigenous Representation and Participation in Canada’s Media Arts, edited by Dana Claxton and Ezra Winton. Waterloo: Wilfrid Laurier University Press, 2019
- Nagam, Julie. “Disruption Toronto’s Urban Space Through the Creative (In)terventions of Robert Houle.” In Εικόνα Visual Studies Vol 1. Mexico City: SIMO Cultura, 2019.
- Nagan, Julie. “Traveling Soles: Tracing the Footprints of Our Stolen Sisters.” In Canadian Voices on Performance Studies/Theory, edited by Laura Levin and Marlis Schweitzer. Montreal: McGill-Queens Press, 2017.
- Nagam, Julie. “Deciphering the Digital and Binary Codes of Sovereignty/Self-Determination and Recognition/Emancipation.” PUBLIC Art, Culture, Ideas 54: Indigenous Art. Edited by Heather Igloliorte, Julie Nagam, and Carla Taunton (Winter 2016).
- Nagam, Julie, Heather Igloliorte, and Carla Taunton. “Transmissions: The Future Possibilities of Indigenous Digital and New Media Art.” PUBLIC Art, Culture, Ideas 54: Indigenous Art. Edited by Heather Igloliorte, Julie Nagam, and Carla Taunton (Winter 2016).
- Nagam, Julie. “Mapping Stories of Place: An Alternative Cartography Through the Visual Narrative of Jeff Thomas.” In Diverse Spaces: Examining Identity, Heritage, and Community Within Canadian Public Culture, edited by Susan Ashley. New York: Cambridge Scholars Press, 2013.
- Nagam, Julie. “(Re)Mapping the Colonized Body: The Creative Interventions of Rebecca Belmore in the Cityscape.” American Indian Culture and Research Journal 35, no. 4 (2011): 147–166.
- Nagam, Julie. “Transforming & Grappling with Concepts of Activism and Feminism with Indigenous Women Artists.” Atlantis: A Women Studies Journal (Halifax: Mount Saint Vincent University, 2008).

=== Curatorial practice ===
In 2017, she co-curated the exhibition INSURGENCE/RESURGENCE with Indigenous artist/curator Jaimie Isaac for the Winnipeg Art Gallery featuring 29 contemporary Indigenous artists. Nagam also worked with The Forks and the Winnipeg Foundation to curate a public art installation at Niizhoziibean.

==== GLAM Collective ====
Nagam is a member of GLAM Collective, a group of scholars who work collaboratively “through theory, curatorial and artistic practices.” With GLAM, Nagam co-curated a series of digital and new media incubators (Memory Keepers I, II, and III) for Indigenous artists, resulting in the installation of works at three Canadian night festivals in 2019. That same year, she also co-curated gathering across moana with GLAM Collective. The exhibition brought together artists from the Pacific and Turtle Islands at Trinity Square Video in Toronto, Canada.

=== Artistic practice ===
Nagam has exhibited her work internationally, including in Canada, United States, Brazil, France, New Zealand, and England.[citations needed] In 2019, her solo exhibition locating the little heartbeats was shown at Gallery 1C03 in Winnipeg and travelled to Te Whare Hera in Wellington, New Zealand. Nagam's work our future is in the land: if we listen to it was exhibited in the 2017 group show Transformers at the Smithsonian Museum in New York.
