= Grace Dillon =

American academic and author

Academic background
- Education: California State University, Fullerton (BA, MA); University of California, Riverside (PhD)
- Thesis: Carefull Verse in Watchman's Song: A Study of Spenser's Prophetic Voice (1997)
- Doctoral advisor: Stanley Stewart

Academic work
- Institutions: Portland State University
- Notable works: Walking the Clouds; Hive of Dreams; The Routledge Handbook of CoFuturisms

Grace L. Dillon is an American academic and author. She is a professor in the Indigenous Nations Studies Program, in the School of Gender, Race, and Nations, at Portland State University. She received her PhD in literary studies with an emphasis in sixteenth-century literature, and her recent research regards science fiction studies.

Similar to the concept of Afrofuturism that was created in 1993, Dillon is best known for coining Indigenous futurism, a movement consisting of art, literature and other forms of media which express Indigenous perspectives of the past, present and future in the context of science fiction and related sub-genres. Although Grace Dillon coined the term indigenous futurisms in 2003, the first publication of its kind with a focus on Indigenous futurisms, Walking the Clouds, was not published until 2012.

== Academic work ==
Dillon is the editor of Walking the Clouds: An Anthology of Indigenous Science Fiction, which is the first anthology of Indigenous science fiction short stories, published by the University of Arizona Press in 2012. She organized the collection with the following sub-genres: Native Slipstream, Contact, Indigenous Science and Sustainability, Native Apocalypse, and Returning to Ourselves. The anthology includes works from Gerald Vizenor, Leslie Marmon Silko, Sherman Alexie, William Sanders and Stephen Graham Jones. The anthology brings together multiple stories from authors who are Native American, First Nations, Aboriginal Australian, and New Zealand Maori.

Previously, Dillon has edited Hive of Dreams: Contemporary Science Fiction from the Pacific Northwest, which was published in 2003 by Oregon State University Press. This is an anthology of science fiction from writers living in the Pacific Northwest, and features works from authors such as Greg Bear, Octavia Butler, and Molly Gloss. She also coedited The Routledge Handbook of CoFuturisms with Taryne Jade Taylor, Isiah Lavender III, and Bodhisattva Chattopadhyay. This book was published in 2023 by Routledge. The book dives into different forms of futurisms, such as Latinx futurisms, Afrofuturisms, and Indigenous futurisms.

== Selected works ==
- Hive of Dreams: Contemporary Science Fiction from the Pacific Northwest. Oregon State University Press. 2003.
- Indigenous Scientific Literacies in Nalo Hopkinson's Ceremonial Worlds. GL Dillon. Journal of the Fantastic in the Arts. 2007.
- Walking The Clouds: An Anthology Of Indigenous Science Fiction. University of Arizona Press. 2012.
- The Routledge Handbook of CoFuturisms. Routledge. 2023.
