= Chicanafuturism =

Artistic genre

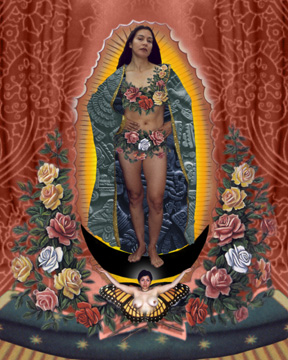
Our Lady (1999) by Alma Lopez. Ramírez writes that this piece "testifies to the dynamism and malleability of Chicana art and cultural identity."

The term Chicanafuturism was originated by scholar Catherine S. Ramírez which she introduced in Aztlán: A Journal of Chicano Studies in 2004. The term is a portmanteau of 'chicana' and 'futurism'. The word 'chicana' refers to a woman or girl of Mexican origin or descent. However, 'Chicana' itself serves as a chosen identity for many female Mexican Americans in the United States, to express self-determination and solidarity in a shared cultural, ethnic, and communal identity while openly rejecting assimilation. Ramírez created the concept of Chicanafuturism as a response to white androcentrism that she felt permeated science-fiction and American society. Chicanafuturism can be understood as part of a larger genre of Latino futurisms.

Ramírez is "a scholar of migration, citizenship, race, and gender; Latinx literary, cultural, and visual studies; and Mexican American history." She is an Associate Professor of Latin American and Latino Studies at the University of California Santa Cruz. She is the author of The Woman in the Zoot Suit: Gender, Nationalism, and the Cultural Politics of Memory.

== Concept/theory ==
Chicanafuturism examines the impact that technology and scientific innovation have on Mexican-American life and culture. It explores the use of science-fiction and imaginative art forms as a way to challenge oppressive systems and ideologies as well as explore alternative futures. Chicanafuturism proposes to disrupt preconceived notions put forward in mainstream science-fiction that the future should be a place devoid of gender and racial diversity. It creates a statement proclaiming Chicanas/os right to exist not only in the future but in the present and past. As such, using speculative fiction becomes not only a way to create future possibility but a way to ignite current social change and resistance. By questioning ideas of race, history, gender, and class, it pushes for personal empowerment side by side with societal progress against oppressive systems present in society. Works that center people of Mexican American descent, particularly women and queer people, in narratives of science, technology, and thus progress, can be understood as works of Chicanafuturistic art and literature.

=== Borderlands ===
Chicanafuturism includes the interrogation of the space between the U.S. and Mexico borders, in geopolitical and spiritual terms. Science-fiction themes used by Chicana/o writers help to express experiences in the "borderlands" such as marginalization, displacement, and alienation as well as survival and resistance. In addition to expressing experiences, Chicanafuturist texts use science fiction to explore the relationship between Chicana/o identity and the border in the context of multinational capitalism, especially post-NAFTA.

== Roots in other movements and theories ==
=== Chicano Movement ===
The Chicano Movement of the 1960s, also known as the Chicano Civil Rights Movement or El Movimiento, was a civil rights movement extending the Mexican-American civil rights movement of the 1960s with the stated goal of achieving Mexican American empowerment. The term 'Chicano' primarily held a negative connotation prior to the Chicano Movement until it was reclaimed as an identity of solidarity and pride in their Mexican American heritage. In the 1970s, Chicano identity became further defined by a reverence for machismo while also maintaining the values of their original platform. The Chicano Manifesto (1971) has written that machismo was "in fact an underlying drive of the gathering identification of Mexican Americans... the essence of machismo, of being macho, is as much a symbolic principle for the Chicano revolt as it is a guideline for family life." Thus, one of the biggest issues faced by Chicana women was that Mexican American men drew their masculinity by forcing traditional female identity on women, expecting women to bear as many children as they could.

=== Feminism ===
Chicanafuturism is rooted in Chicana feminism and feminist theory, building on the work of Gloria Anzaldúa, Chela Sandoval, and others. This can be seen in the term itself which uses the feminine ending of the word Chicana rather than the masculine Chicano, thus creating space for the experiences of women and people who are not cisgender men to be centered in speculative art forms.

The omission of Chicanas and the masculine-focused foundations of Chicano identity, created a shift in consciousness and a need for more representation among some Chicanas/os by the 1990s. Xicanisma was coined as a movement and concept by Ana Castillo, an author in Massacre of the Dreamers: Essays on Xicanisma (1994) as a recognition of this shift. The replacement of the 'ch' beginning in 'chicana' with 'X' was an attempt at recentering the indigenous roots of the culture. Through using the Nahua language and pronunciation of the sound 'ch', there was a refocus from the Eurocentric ties to the identity by replacing the Spanish letter 'ch'. While still recognizing many of the foundational elements of Chicano identity, some Xicana feminists have preferred to identify as Xicana because of the masculine-focused foundations of Chicano identity and the patriarchal biases inherent in the Spanish language.

=== Afrofuturism ===
Chicanafuturism takes influence from Afrofuturism, which creates speculative fiction art forms through the lens of people of African descent living in the United States. Coined by Mark Dery in 1993, the movement, philosophy, and aesthetic was explored in the late 1990s through conversations and artistic expression. Afrofuturism addresses themes and concerns of the African diaspora through technoculture and science fiction, with a shared interest in envisioning black futures stemming from Afro Diasporic experiences.

“Chicanafuturism articulates colonial and postcolonial histories of indigenismo, mestizaje, hegemony, and survival” similarly to how Afrofuturism utilizes science fiction themes such as abduction, alienation, slavery, and displacement to reflect the experience of the African diaspora. Afrofuturist and feminist writers such as Octavia Butler, author of Parable of the Sower and Kindred, have had a significant influence on the development of the concept of Chicanafuturism, as noted by the author Catherine S. Ramírez.

== Influence from authors and artists ==
According to Ramírez, the authors that have had the biggest influence on her understanding of Chicanafuturism and the creation of the concept have been Octavia Butler and Gloria Anzaldúa.

=== Octavia Butler ===
Octavia Butler's fiction works make great use of Afrofuturism and Feminism. Her book Parable of the Sower depicts the struggle of a community in the collapse of 21st century America, with the perspective of a young girl of African American descent. The book comments on socio-political issues present in modern-day by highlighting challenges to survival due to poor environmental stewardship, corporate greed, and the growing wealth gap. This book, like many of her others, proposes alternate philosophical views and religious interventions as solutions to such possible dilemmas in the context of female empowerment and African American cultural stances. The feminist nature of Octavia Butler's Afrofuturist novels inspired Ramírez to utilize similar theories for other minority groups such as Latinx/o/as, Spanish-speaking Americans, and Chicanas.

=== Gloria Anzaldúa ===
Gloria Anzaldúa's writing has contributed significantly to feminist, Chicana, and queer theories. In her semi-autobiographical work Borderlands/La Frontera: The New Mestiza, Anzaldúa discusses several issues related to Chicana experiences, like heteronormativity, colonialism, and male dominance. Giving a personal account of the oppression of Chicana lesbians and the gendered expectations of behavior that causes women's deference to the male authority in her community, Anzaldúa introduces the idea of a “new mestiza” or a “new higher consciousness” that is able to break down barriers between Mexican and American identities and fight against the dualistic norms of gender.

=== Marion C. Martinez ===
In addition to taking inspiration from Afrofuturism, Chicanafuturism draws from the art of Latina artists such as Marion C. Martinez. Martinez's artwork explores the connections between Chicana/o cultural identity and science and technology. Martinez's artwork often uses items related to technology itself, such as circuits, wires, and resistors to construct futuristic looking themes common to Chicana/o culture. Catholicism is a common theme in some of her non-wearable pieces, such as Guadalupe, Queen of Heaven, and Christ which are traditional images of the titular people made with circuit board pieces and holographic foils for a more futuristic aesthetic.

== Chicanafuturist artists ==
=== Amparo Chi ===
Chicana artist Amparo Chi drew inspiration from murals by Chicano artists around the Los Angeles, where she was raised. Her work, Semillas de la Vida, depicts the culture as it has been passed down from ancestors to the present. All three people presented in the painting are women. One, who is the ancestor, is dressed very colorfully with a head and filled with vibrant feathers. The second woman is older and appears to be the grandmother of the last, and youngest girl. The grandmother and her granddaughters' hair is connected and seems to be significant as she passes down the culture and history or her heritage.

=== Andrea Ramirez ===
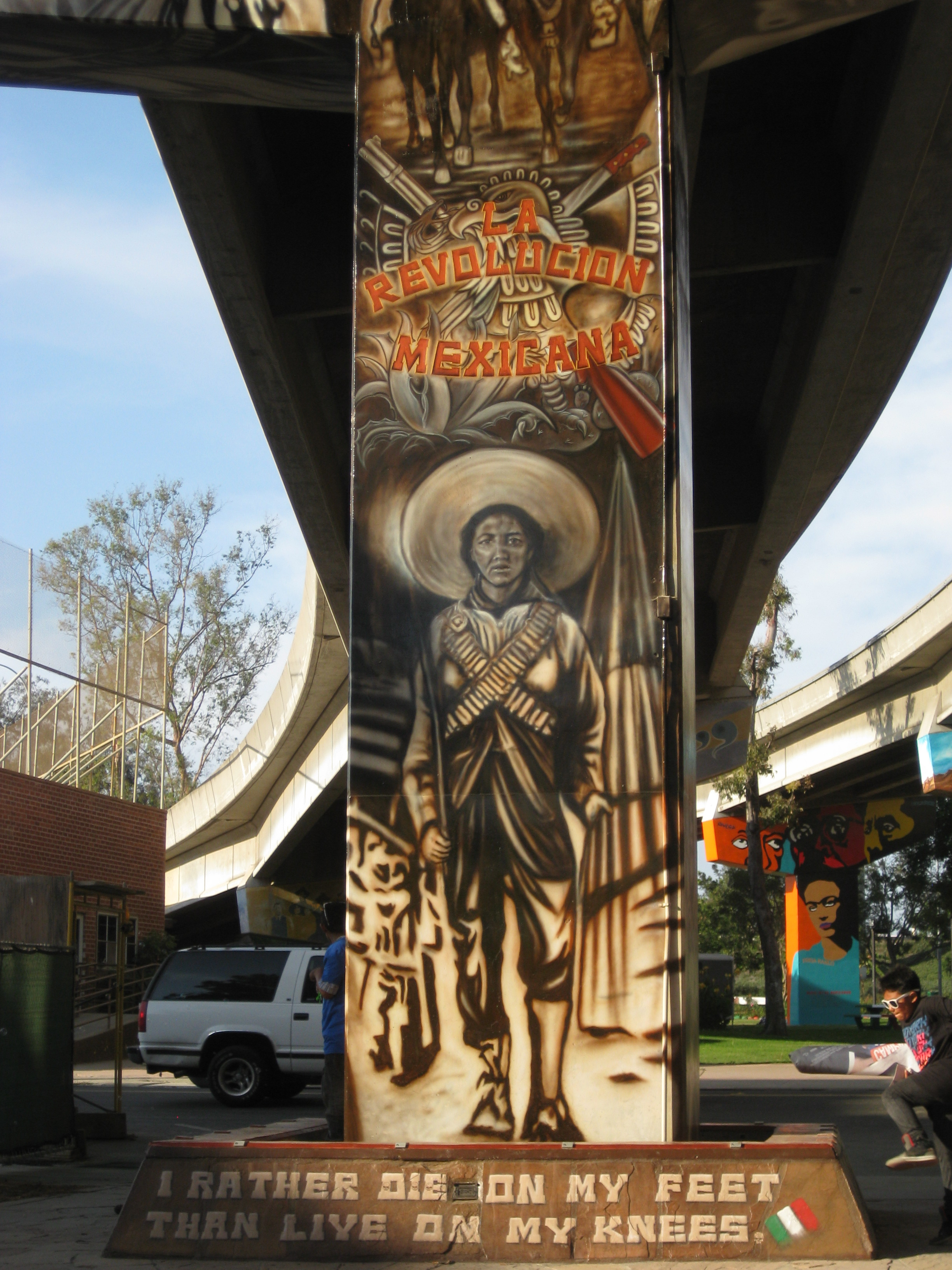
Mural pertaining to the Mexican Revolution.

Andrea Ramirez's artwork, Arbol de la Pura Vida, captures a family tree of sorts that centers around women. She developed her skills in her community with influence from her family that is Mexican and Costa Rican.

There are many pieces in her work that are inspired by Otomi and Nahua traditions. The Otomi are Indigenous people that inhabited the central plateau of Mexico. These people are very close-knit, especially with the bonds made between families or godparents. The Nahua are Indigenous peoples in central Mexico. Ramirez's work, Arbol de la Pura Vida, emphasizes strong familial connections that persist across generations.

== See also ==
- Afrofuturism
- Border art
- Chicano literature
- Gloria Anzaldúa: Borderlands/La Frontera
- Indigenous Futurisms
- Latinofuturism
