= Nanobah Becker =

American filmmaker

- Education: Brown University, B.A.; Columbia University, M.F.A.
- Known for: Filmmaking, scriptwriting, directing
- Notable work: The Sixth World, Conversion, Flat, I Lost My Shadow, Full
- Style: Indigenous Futurisms

Nanonah Becker is a Diné filmmaker from Albuquerque, New Mexico, who lives and works in Los Angeles, California (Tovaangar). Several of her short films have earned national awards, and her work has been collected and exhibited by major museums. Becker is particularly noted for her narrative focus on Indigenous futurism and work promoting Navajo language in film. Nanonah Becker is a citizen of the Navajo Nation.

== Education ==
Becker earned a B.A. in anthropology from Brown University in 1997 and an M.F.A. in film (concentration in screenwriting and directing) from Columbia University in 2006.

== Career ==
Nanonah Becker is best known as a filmmaker, both a screenwriter and director, of short films that explore Indigenous futurisms. Perhaps her best known short film is "The Sixth World," which aired as an episode of the PBS series, FutureStates, in 2012 (Season 3, Episode 6). "The Sixth World" draws upon Navajo origin stories to imagine their positive impact on future cultures. Becker's work is called out for its turn toward a version of science fiction that uplifts Indigenous values as a promising avenue for cultural development in future societies. Disney/Pixar also worked with her as the dialog director for the Navajo language version of the film Finding Nemo. Becker's work has been collected and exhibited by major museums, such as the Baltimore Museum of Art and National Gallery of Canada. More recently, Becker's short, "Landback, Waterback," premiered at the Kennedy Center in Washington, D.C. in 2022.

== Awards ==
Becker has received special recognition and awards for her films "Flat," "Conversion," and "The Sixth World." She was a 2005 Sundance Ford Fellow, and the 2007 Sundance Film Festival selected her film, "Conversion." Her screenplay, "Full," won her a Rockefeller Foundation/RENEW Fellowship in Independent Film in 2006. The ImagineNATIVE Film and Video festival honored her with Best Music Video for “I Lost My Shadow” in 2011, and the International Cherokee Film Festival awarded Becker with Best Sci-Fi (Science Fiction Dramatic Short) for “The Sixth World” in 2012.
