= Âhasiw Maskêgon-Iskwêw =

Cree and French Métis theorist, curator and artist

Âhasiw Kitocigan Maskêgon-Iskwêw (1958–2006) was a Cree and French Métis theorist, curator and artist. Maskêgon-Iskwêw was a significant figure in the field of contemporary Indigenous arts, and a formative proponent of digital media within Indigenous communities. In their 2015 book dedication to him, Steven Loft and Kerry Swanson describe Maskêgon-Iskwêw as "one of the foremost thinkers and practitioners of Aboriginal new media art."

An archive of Maskêgon-Iskwêw's work is maintained by grunt gallery.

== Early life and education ==
Âhasiw Maskêgon-Iskwêw (Donald Ghostkeeper) was born in 1958 in McLennan, Alberta. He graduated from Emily Carr College of Art and Design in Vancouver, British Columbia, in 1985, and also studied at Simon Fraser University and Vancouver Community College.

== Artwork ==
Maskêgon-Iskwêw created both Web-based and video-integrated performance artworks. Significant works include: Mestih'kusowin (Holocaust), Pitt Gallery, Vancouver (1990); Sakehi'towin Onipowak, Western Front Gallery, Vancouver (1992); and Hunter, Pitt Gallery, Vancouver (1993). In 1996, working as artistic director, writer, and producer, Maskêgon-Iskwêw brought ten artists together to create isi-pîkiskwêwin-ayapihkêsîsak (Speaking the Language of Spiders). This Web-based artwork was exhibited at the Canadian Cultural Centre in Paris in the group exhibition Cyclic and at the Walter Phillips Gallery in the 2003 group exhibition BACK/FLASH.

Maskêgon-Iskwêw's artworks have been exhibited in multiple group exhibitions, including Exposed: The Aesthetics of Aboriginal Erotic Art at the MacKenzie Art Gallery in 1999; multiple iterations of the Indigenous Net art network CyberPowWow; and in the exhibition Language of Intercession at the Art Gallery of Hamilton in 2003.

== Curatorial and arts administration ==
Maskêgon-Iskwêw maintained an active curatorial practice across Canada. He held positions as director at Vancouver's Pitt Gallery (1988–1990); the Native Education Centre in Vancouver (1990–1991); and the Canada Council for the Arts Art Bank (1992–1994), during which time he fulfilled two residencies with the Saskatchewan Indian Federated College and Circle Vision Arts Corporation in Regina, and the Aboriginal Film and Video Art Alliance at the Banff Centre for the Arts. Between 1994 and 2005, Maskêgon-Iskwêw administered the on-line Aboriginal media arts network Drumbeats to Drumbytes. In 1994, he became program coordinator, acting executive director, and assistant editor of the Talking Stick First Nations Arts Magazine for Circle Vision Arts Corporation. In 1995, Maskêgon-Iskwêw co-curated with Debra Piapot the exhibition nanâtawihitowin-âcimowina (Healing Stories): Three Collaborative First Peoples Performances at the Walter Phillips Gallery in Banff. From 1996 to 1996, he was Production Manager for the SOIL Digital Media Production Suite at Neutral Ground Artist-Run Centre.

Maskêgon-Iskwêw also worked as artistic director for the development of community-based media art projects with groups such as sex trade workers and youth at risk for Common Weal in Regina (1998–1999) and advocated for increased support for community/artist collaborations at St. Norbert Arts Centre (1999–2000). A significant force for online development of Indigenous communities, Maskêgon-Iskwêw was a member of both the Canada Council Inter-Arts Office Advisory Committee (1999–2003) and its Media Arts Internet Dissemination Working Group (2001).

In 2002, Maskêgon-Iskwêw curated Signified: Ritual Language in First Nations Performance Art, with Reona Brass and Bently Spang at Sâkêwêwâk Artists' Collective in Regina. In both 2003 and 2004 he was a facilitator at the annual Connecting Aboriginal Canadians Forum in Ottawa, presented by the Aboriginal Canada Portal Working Group. In his position of New Media Curator at Urban Shaman Contemporary Aboriginal Art Gallery, in 2005 Maskêgon-Iskwêw developed the online platform Storm Spirits: The Cultural Ecology of Aboriginal New Media Art. Furthermore, he launched Urban Shaman's Conundrum Online Aboriginal Arts Magazine at this time. As a founding member of the Aboriginal Curatorial Collective / Collectif des Conservateurs autochtones (ACC/CCA), in 2006 he was employed to research and develop the corporate objects and bylaws for the organization, produce their website, and assist in coordinating a major national gathering for the organization.

== Writing ==
Maskêgon-Iskwêw's writing has appeared in Talking Stick First Nations Arts Magazine, Mix (formerly Parallélogramme), and Fuse Magazine, and in multiple anthologies, including Caught in the Act: An Anthology of Performance Art by Canadian Women (2004), and Transference, Tradition, Technology: Native New Media Exploring Visual & Digital Culture (2005).
