= Salina Bookshelf =

Publishing company in Flagstaff, Arizona, U.S.

- Founded: 1994
- Founder: Eric and Kenneth Lockard
- Country of origin: United States
- Headquarters location: Flagstaff, Arizona
- Publication types: Books
- Official website: www.salinabookshelf.com

Salina Bookshelf, Inc. is a publishing company based in Flagstaff, Arizona.

Founded in 1994 by teenagers Eric and Kenneth Lockard, non-native but fluent in the Navajo language due to growing up among the Navajo, the company specializes in Navajo-language books, mostly for children and teenagers. The company is the only Navajo-language publisher in the United States.

Among its publications are a bilingual edition of the children's book Who wants to be a prairie dog? in English and Navajo, and Diné Bizaad Bínáhooʼaah, a Navajo language textbook that was officially adopted by the state of New Mexico in 2008.

Salina Bookshelf currently has six full-time employees and three translators.
