= Mary Anne Barkhouse =

Canadian artist (1961)

- Born: 1961 (age 64–65); Vancouver, British Columbia
- Education: Ontario College of Art, 1991
- Known for: Jewellery maker and Sculptor

Mary Anne Barkhouse RCA (born 1961) is a jeweller and sculptor residing in Haliburton, Ontario, Canada. She belongs to the Nimpkish band of the Kwakiutl First Nation.

== Early life and education ==
Barkhouse was born in Vancouver, British Columbia, in 1961. She is related to several artists from the Kwakwaka'wakw art tradition, including Ellen Neel, Mungo Martin, and Charlie James. She was a student of metalsmith Lois Betteridge. In the 1980s Barkhouse played bass with the Ottawa, Ontario punk band The Restless Virgins.

== Career ==
Barkhouse began her professional career in the 1990s and has since explored contemporary environmental and indigenous concerns, often incorporating animal imagery.

One of Barkhouse's most significant works is Harvest (2009), a mixed media sculpture created for the Muhheakantuck in Focus exhibition at Wave Hill in the Bronx, NY. The sculpture portrays the names of indigenous groups from the Hudson Valley on porcelain objects arranged on a European-style table. A bronze coyote appears to pull at the tablecloth, giving the impression that the table service may topple to the ground. The sculpture has been acquired by the National Gallery of Canada.

Barkhouse is a member of the Royal Canadian Academy of Arts.

== Public Sculpture and Installation ==
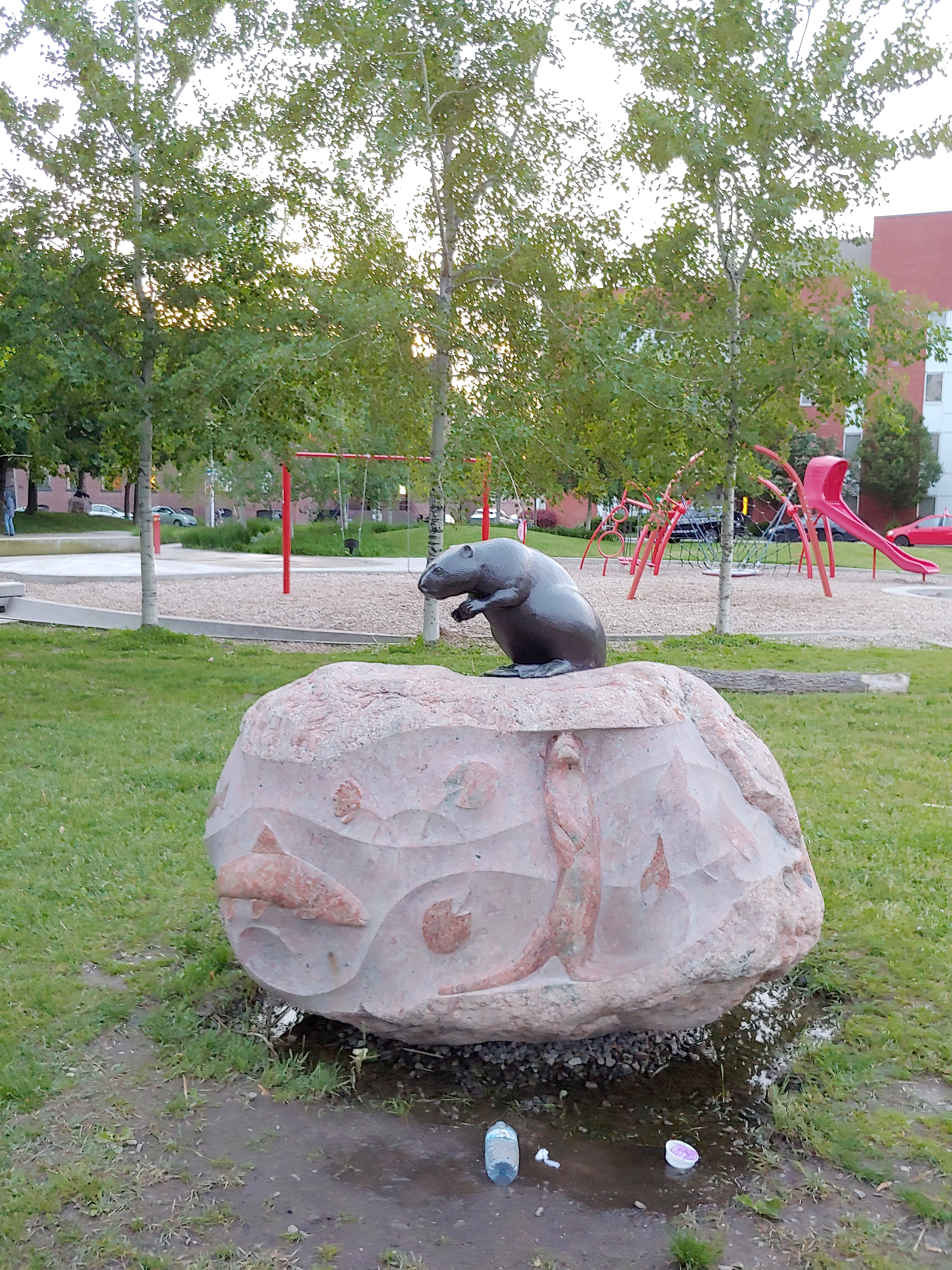
Beaver sculpture, part of Echo. Joel Weeks Park, Toronto

A major early installation of Barkhouse's is Lichen (1998, McMichael Canadian Art Collection), a collaboration with Michael Belmore. It includes several bronze sculptures of wolves, and a transit shelter with a poster of a raven.

The McMaster Museum of Art in Hamilton, ON, owns Covenant (2012), a sculpture of two coyotes encountering each other.

The Canadian Museum of History installed 'namaxsala (To Travel in a Boat Together) (2013), a bronze and copper sculpture of a wolf in a canoe, staring across the Ottawa River at Parliament Hill. The work was inspired by a story told to Belmore by her grandfather.

Echo, installed in 2015 in Joel Weeks Park in Toronto, features three separate cast bronze sculptures. They include four squirrels worshiping an acorn, a beaver, and a fox.

=== Selected exhibitions ===
- Exposed: Native Women Photographers Group Show, Niroquois Gallery, Brantford, Ontario, 1991.
- Shades of Red, Pow Wow Gallery, Toronto, Ontario, 1991.
- Early Morning Wolf Stretching Exercises (1993) "Multiplicity: A New Cultural Strategy." Museum of Anthropology at UBC, Vancouver, British Columbia, Canada.
- Sanctuary, Art Gallery of Peterborough, Ontario, 2005.
- Beaver Tales: Canadian Art and Design, 2008, Toronto Art Centre, Toronto, Ontario.
- Reins of Chaos, 2008, Ottawa Art Gallery, Ottawa Ontario.
- Boreal Baroque, Mary Anne Barkhouse, 2009, The Robert McLaughlin Gallery, Oshawa, Ontario; Espanade Art Gallery, Medicine Hat, Alberta.
- Close Encounters: The Next 400 Years, 2011, Group exhibition featuring 33 Indigenous artists from Canada, the United States, Australia, New Zealand (Aotearoa), Finland, and Brazil, Plug IN ICA, Winnipeg, Manitoba.
- What is Land, 2012, Tree Museum in Gravenhurst, Ontario (2012).
- Facing the Animal, 2012, Julie Andreyev, Bill Burns, Mary Anne Barkhouse, Vancouver, B.C.
- Sakahan: International Indigenous Art, 2013, National Gallery of Canada, Ottawa.
- Mary Anne Barkhouse: Le rêve aux loups (retrospective), 2017, Koffler Centre of the Arts, Toronto. The show went on tour with additional works created for the Esker Foundation exhibition in Calgary, Alberta.
- Hearts of Our People: Native Women Artists, 2019, Minneapolis Institute of Art, Minneapolis, Minnesota, United States.
- Opimihaw, 2021, Wanuskewin Gallery, Saskatoon, SK
- Ndishnikaaz | Nugwa’am | My name is, 2025, Art Windsor Essex, Windsor, Ontario.

== Collections ==
Barkhouse's work is included in the collections of the National Gallery of Canada (Harvest, 2009 and Sovereign, 2007), Mendel Art Gallery, MacKenzie Art Gallery, Art Bank of the Canada Council for the Arts, The Robert McLaughlin Gallery (Grace, 2007), the UBC Museum of Anthropology, Art Gallery of Guelph, Banff Centre for the Arts, Ontario Archives (Persevere, 2006) and the Department of Indian and Northern Affairs.

== Bibliography ==
- Ahlberg, Yohe J, and Teri Greeves. Hearts of Our People. Native Women Artists. Seattle: University of Washington Press, 2019.
- Hill, Greg A, Candice Hopkins, and Christine Lalonde. Sakahàn: International Indigenous Art. Ottawa: National Gallery of Canada, 2013.
