= CyberPowWow =

Online gallery with digital artworks and a library of texts

CyberPowWow is an Indigenous-determined online gallery with digital artworks and a library of texts. Conceived in 1996, it was live online from 1997 to 2004 in four main iterations. CyberPowWow was part webspace and part chatroom, and all artwork displayed on the website was created specifically for CyberPowWow. The website was hosted in Time Warner's The Palace, a popular and influential chat room of the late 1990s and early 2000s.

== First CyberPowWow exhibition ==
For the first CyberPowWow event six Indigenous artists and writers were invited to create original site-specific works. The exhibition was launched with a simultaneous, distributed chat event. Participating artists, writers, and the wider public were invited to log on to the Palace to engage artists and visitors in discussions about the artwork. Skawennati Tricia Fragnito (known professionally as Skawennati), one of the developers of CyberPowWow, and Jason Edward Lewis state that, "the event was successful in terms of the Aboriginal art and issues it brought into a public venue," but that, "critical dialogue was often interrupted by 'non-participants' drifting in from other chat rooms."

== CyberPowWow 2 ==
CyberPowWow 2 signaled the launch of a separate Palace unique to CyberPowWow. Eight Indigenous artists and writers customized the chat space with imagery, scripts, and a variety of "Indian" avatars. Artists presented their work and answered questions about it from an enthusiastic audience composed largely of people from the Canadian contemporary art community. The participants included Ahasiw Maskegon-Iskwew, Sheryl Kootenhayoo, who contributed a Quicktime virtual reality piece, and Lori Blondeau, who created and led a virtual round dance.

== CPW 2K: CyberPowWow Goes Global ==
The third incarnation of CyberPowWow included not only Canadian and American artists, but, for the first time, Australian artists as well as non-Indigenous artists. The Indigenous participants were joined by Mare Burgess, a white feminist researcher who studies "Indian" warrior women, and Sheila Urbanoski, a white artist who grew up in a town bordering a reserve. Skawennati remarked in her curatorial essay: "Now that we have marked our territory, built a Palace and furnished it, it is time to invite in our neighbors: digital artists in the non-Native world. These friends, collaborators, and kindred spirits can talk about the very topic that we are engendering: Aboriginal meets non-Aboriginal."
