= Latine =

Gender-neutral term for Latin Americans

Latine is a gender-neutral neologism developed as an alternative to the terms Latino, Latina, or Latinx used to identify people of Latin American descent. Latine is relatively new, only gaining use in the late 2010s. The term stems from the more popular term Latinx.

Both Latine and Latinx can be used in a similar manner. Although Latinx functions well as an adjective, Latine is better suited to function as a noun and can easily take the plural form, Latines.The term Latinx ends with an "x" which makes it more difficult for Spanish speakers to pronounce. In contrast, Latine is more accessible to Spanish speakers because the “-e” word ending is a vowel sound that is standard in Spanish and is parallel to other gender-neutral words in Spanish, such as estudiante. Latine also complements "elle," a pronoun used to refer to gender-nonconforming people in Spanish.

The linguistic use of Latine is best suited for people from Hispanic America and is less accessible to Latin Americans who speak other Romance languages. It does not function as a gender-neutral term for people from Franco America because Latine is already the feminine form of Latin in French.

Latinx's main use is in the United States and in academia, and the increasing number of people identifying as non-binary and seeking terms that affirm their gender identities are some of the reasons as to why Latine is gaining attention and use. Although just 3% of Hispanic Americans said they used Latinx in a 2020 Pew Research Center survey, younger generations are becoming more aware of gender-neutral alternatives like Latine.

The term is new to many countries outside Chile and Argentina, it is beginning to gain acceptance in both academia and everyday use. While the term is more inclusive and making its way to other countries, many people who identify as Hispanic or Latino are still unaware of terms such as Latine or Latinx, with the majority being older people ages 50 and above.

== History ==
Latine is the feminine form of Latin in the French language.

In English and Spanish, Latine is a gender-inclusive alternative to, Latino/a. The Spanish word Latino is a shortened form of latinoamericano, and modeled on the French term Amérique latine (Latin America). In English, Latino and Latina are loanwords from Spanish, where they are used as gendered terms to refer to people of Latin American descent.

Latino is considered a gender-neutral word by the Royal Spanish Academy. It is often used when discussing groups made up of multiple genders, or when gender is unknown. In the 1970s American Feminists began critiquing and creating alternatives to the patriarchal and gender-exclusive use of a masculine term as gender-neutral. In 1976, Alvaro Garcia Meseguer argued that Spanish defaulting to the masculine when discussing mixed gender groups is sexist. He proposed replacing the "-o" with an "-e" since "-e" morphemes were already considered gender neutral. the use of the "-e" has been increasing in Latin America since the 1980s. However, the Royal Spanish Academy dictionary does not acknowledge the "-e" or the "-x" suffixes as gender-neutral.

The exact origin of the term Latine as a gender-neutral neologism for Spanish is unclear; it is said to have originated from LGBTQ+ online activists wanting a more inclusive term to identify themselves aside from the difficult-to-pronounce Latinx. However, the term is also said to have originated in Chile and Argentina, being used by young student activists during protests. The interconnectedness of the Latina identity was highlighted by these demonstrations, which frequently addressed concerns of gender equality, LGBTQ+ rights, and language decolonization.

In 2019, The Washington Post published an article that details the effects that the usage of gender-inclusive language had on Spanish-speaking populations after a young teenager spoke in a television interview. "Natalia Mira, 18, used gender-neutral language in a television interview that made headlines across the Spanish-speaking world last year. The viral video made her the subject of attacks, but now the form is finding official acceptance."

Some US institutions, such as the Chicago History Museum, are shifting from using Latino/a/x to Latine.

== Reception ==
The "-x" ending is most popular in the United States. In the U.S. 3% of Hispanics and Latinos prefer to use the term "Latinx." Most of these people are young English-speaking women with some college experience. Latine is preferred over Latinx in Spanish-speaking Latin American countries. However, Latino and Latina are still the most preferred variation. A speaker's preference on whether or not to use a gender-neutral form of Latino is considered to reveal information about the speaker's identity and political views.

Although many people regard Latine, Latinx and other alternative forms of Latino as interchangeable, each carry different meanings and implications. The Latin American population is diverse and complex, preferences and perspectives on the rising number of gender-neutral alternatives vary. Many scholars stress the importance of asking people which terms they prefer to use for themselves.
