= Bunky Echo-Hawk =

Defamed Native American painter

Bunky Echo–Hawk
- Born: Walter Roy Echo-Hawk Jr. 1975 (age 50–51); Yakama Nation Reservation, Toppenish, Washington, U.S.
- Citizenship: Yakama Nation and American
- Education: Associate of Art degree, Creative Writing, Institute of American Indian Arts; Toyota Fellow, Jack Kerouac School of Disembodied Poetics, Naropa University
- Known for: Acrylic painting, poetry
- Movement: Hip hop, Native pop

Bunky Echo–Hawk (born 1975) is a Native American artist and poet who is best known for his acrylic paintings concerning Native American topics and hip-hop culture. He works in a variety of media that include paintings, graphic design, photography, and writing.

== Biography ==
Walter Roy "Bunky" Echo–Hawk Jr. is a descendant of the Pawnee Nation of Oklahoma, and an enrolled citizen of the Yakama Nation. He attended the Institute of American Indian Arts in the 1990s. He served as the "co-founder and the Executive Director of NVision, a national Native nonprofit that focuses on Native youth development," and he is also a traditional singer and dancer. In 2020, Echo-Hawk was featured in the PBS series American Masters for his work on Native rights and environmentalism.

== Themes and style ==
Scholar Olena McLaughlin, writing in the journal Transmotion, categorizes Echo-Hawk's work as follows: "Although it is within the stream of Native Pop, Echo-Hawk's work leans more towards Pop Surrealism or Lowbrow, a movement that emerged in the 1970s after Pop Art. It engages popular culture, but in a more concrete story-telling way with slightly less ambiguity." In 2011 and beyond, Echo-Hawk collaborated with Nike to develop Native-inspired apparel through their N-7 and Power of Perseverance Collection.

== Personal life and arrest ==
On October 16, 2021, Echo-Hawk was injured and his 15-year-old daughter Alexie was killed in a head-on crash early morning, as they were driving to the Pawnee Nation for a ceremonial tribal dance in Oklahoma.

On January 10, 2022, Bunky Echo-Hawk was arrested for "lewd or indecent acts to children under 16." A young girl reported to a Pawnee County DHS worker that "she was repeatedly touched inappropriately by Echo-Hawk, 46, between 'from the time she was 7 or 8 until 11 or 12 years old'." His preliminary hearing was scheduled for March 15, 2022. Prosecutors also charged Echo-Hawk with possession of juvenile pornography after investigators claimed tablets seized at Echo-Hawk's house has photographs and videos that could be classified as child pornography on them.

The case was transferred to Tulsa County in March of 2024 due to a conflict of interest within the Osage-Pawnee District Attorney's Office. The charge for felony possession of juvenile pornography was dropped that same year and the additional felony charge was dismissed in August of 2024, prior to Echo-Hawk's October 28, 2024 trial date. In dismissing the "lewd or indecent acts" charge, the Tulsa District Attorney's office cited the need for further investigations.

== Public collections ==
- Spencer Museum of Art
- Muscarelle Museum of Art
- National Museum of the American Indian

== Exhibitions ==
- "Ramp It Up: Skateboard Culture in Native America," National Museum of the American Indian, 2009
- Founder's Day Performance, Live audience intervention painting, Feb. 1, 2010, Willamette University
- "Bunky Echo-Hawk: Modern Warrior," Field Museum, 2013
- Shows in Minneapolis, Chicago, New York and Greensboro, NC
