= Marion C. Martinez =

Chicana visual artist

Marion C. Martinez (born January 24, 1954) is a Chicana visual artist who repurposes discarded computer hardware in the production of her artwork.

== Biography ==
Martinez was born in Española, North of Santa Fe, New Mexico and was raised in Los Luceros. While a college student, she lived near and worked at the Los Alamos National Laboratory. That experience inspires her work. As a trained psychotherapist, she worked closely with Hispanic and Native American families.

== Art ==
Martinez began creating art with technology discards in the 1980s after experimenting with video art. Martinez's artwork portray traditional Latino cultural iconography. Much of her art, portray the Virgin de Guadalupe because of her deep connection to her.

Martinez works in series or collections based on iconography. One series or collection presents the Virgen of Guadalupe icon. A second series or collection present the Sacred Heart or Milagros, which are icons typically used for healing. A third series or collection, Martinez titles, AzTechna. Icons in this series, present Martinez's interpretation of cultural legends and myth combined with contemporary technological materials. Martinez's work was featured in the 2022-2023 exhibit Fronteras del Futuro: Art in New Mexico and Beyond at the National Hispanic Cultural Center in Albuquerque, New Mexico, and her work is also part of the Center's permanent collection.

== Wearable Art ==
Martinez began creating wearable "Aztechna/TechnaCessories" in the 1990s, following the Santero traditional style she reconceptualizes in her artworks. One collection shows her pins, which she coins as “TechnaCessories,” depicting Angels, buffalos, bears, and geckos. Another collection of pins includes Milagros (votive) and Corazońes Santos. A third collection depicts “Aztechnas” as a depiction of the hybrid imagery of the Indigenous people in New Mexico and Mexico with Olmec, Corn Dancers, and Long Ladies as designs. Aside from the pins, Martinez also makes bolo ties, money clips, pendants, and even Christmas ornaments.
