= Greg A. Hill (artist) =

Canadian-born First Nations artist and curator

Greg A. Hill is a Canadian-born First Nations artist and curator. He is Kanyen'kehà:ka Mohawk, from Six Nations of the Grand River Territory, Ontario.

== Early life ==
Hill was born and raised in Fort Erie, Ontario.

== Art career ==
His work as a multidisciplinary artist focuses primarily on installation, performance and digital imaging and explores issues of his Mohawk and French-Canadian identity through the prism of colonialism, nationalism and concepts of place and community.

Hill has been exhibiting his work since 1989, with solo exhibitions and performance works across Canada as well as group exhibitions in North America and abroad. His work can be found in the collections of the Canada Council, the Indian Art Centre, Indian and Northern Affairs Canada, the Canadian Native Arts Foundation (now Indspire), the Woodland Cultural Center, the City of Ottawa, the Ottawa Art Gallery and the International Museum of Electrography.

== Curatorial career ==
Hill served as the Audain Senior Curator of Indigenous Art at the National Gallery of Canada but was let go, after a 22 year career, in 2022. Hill, who was the first Indigenous curator at the museum, used social media to share his thoughts, stating that, "“The truth is, I’m being fired because I don’t agree with and am deeply disturbed by the colonial and anti-Indigenous ways the Department of Indigenous Ways and Decolonization is being run.”

During Hill's tenure at the National Gallery, 1,300 works of art by Indigenous artists were acquired for the museum's collection. Among the shows curated by Hill, are a 2016 exhibition Sahahàn (to light a fire), featuring the work of 75 Indigenous artists from countries throughout the world.

== Awards and honours ==
In 2018, Hill received the Indspire Award for Arts.
