= Michael Belmore =

Canadian (Anishnaabe-Ojibwa), born 1971; artist

Michael Belmore RCA (born 1971) is a Canadian sculptor of Anishinaabe descent who works primarily in resistant stone, copper and other metals. His works are in public collections including the National Gallery of Canada, the McMichael Canadian Art Collection, Agnes Etherington Art Centre, National Museum of the American Indian – Smithsonian Museum, and the Art Gallery of Ontario, and he has held exhibitions in both nations.

== Artistic career ==
Born in 1971, Michael Belmore graduated from the Ontario College of Art and Design in 1994 and completed his Masters of Fine Arts at the University of Ottawa in 2019. He is a member of the Royal Canadian Academy of Arts and represented in public collections including the National Gallery of Canada, the McMichael Canadian Art Collection, Agnes Etherington Art Centre, National Museum of the American Indian – Smithsonian Museum, and the Art Gallery of Ontario.

Belmore has staged over ten solo exhibitions and has participated in more than fifteen group shows, including Into the Woods: Two Icons Revisited (2015 Art Gallery of Ontario), Changing Hands: Art without Reservation (2012 Museum of Art & Design), Close Encounters: The Next 500 Years (2011 Winnipeg), HIDE: Skin as Material and Metaphor (2010 National Museum of the American Indian), and Terra Incognita (2007 Macdonald Stewart Art Centre).

Working in resistant stone, copper and other metals, Belmore's process is intricate and time-consuming. Given his deliberate and thoughtful pace, his sculptures and installations are founded on a deep understanding of the qualities – physical and symbolic – of the materials. Curator Olexander Wlasenko has described his approach as “alchemic; vacillating between determination and serendipity. Human intervention into the landscape comes with and without consequence."

In 2023, Belmore was commissioned to create a 2.7 m (8.9 ft) high sculpture at the Gordie Howe International Bridge, with the work recognizing and celebrating First Nations. The sculpture of tree bark, visible as traffic enters and leaves Canada, was installed in October 2024.

== Selected solo exhibitions ==
2020 – Michael Belmore, Art Gallery of Ontario, Toronto

2018 – thunder sky turbulent water, Central Art Garage gallery, Ottawa

2017 – mskwi$\bullet$blood$\bullet$sang, Karsh-Masson Gallery, Ottawa

2016 – fenda, Nogueira da Silva Museum, Braga, Portugal

2015 – Michael Belmore, Royal Melbourne Institute of Technologies Project Space Gallery, Melbourne, Australia

2013 – Toil, Woodstock Art Gallery, Woodstock, ON

2009 – Embankment, Station Gallery, Whitby, ON

2006 – Downstream, Forest City Gallery, London, ON

2005 – Stream, Rails End Gallery & Arts Centre, Haliburton, ON

2002 – Vantage Point, Sacred Circle Gallery of American Indian Art, Seattle, Washington

2001 – fly by wire, AKA Artist-Run Centre/Tribe, Saskatoon, SK

2000 – Eating Crow, Sâkêwêwak Artists’ Collective, Regina, SK

1999 – Ravens Wait, Indian Art Centre, Hull, QC
