= Latinx =

Gender-neutral term for Latin Americans

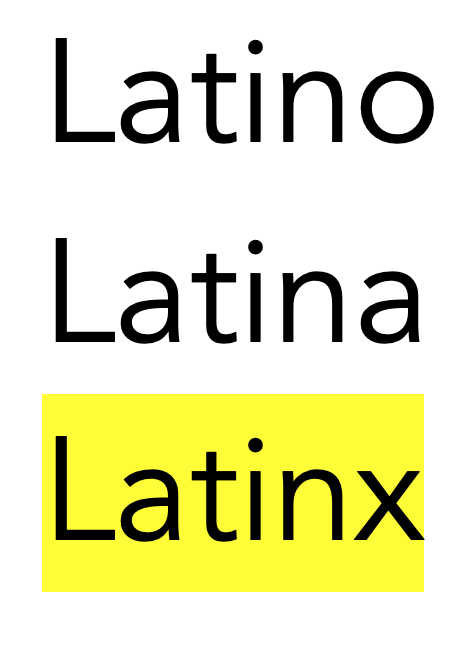
Latinx, gender-neutral term used to describe people who are of Latin American origin or descent

Latinx (/ləˈtiːnɛks/ lə-TEE-neks) is a neologism used to refer to people with Latin American cultural or ethnic identity in the United States. The term aims to be a gender-neutral alternative to Latino and Latina by replacing the masculine ⟨-o⟩ and feminine ⟨-a⟩ ending with the ⟨-x⟩ suffix. The plural for Latinx is Latinxs or Latinxes. The term was first seen online around 2004; it has since been used in social media by activists, students, and academics who seek to advocate for non-binary and genderqueer individuals. Related gender-neutral neologisms include Xicanx or Chicanx as a derivative of Chicano/Chicana.

Latinx does not adhere to conventional grammatical gender rules in Spanish, is difficult to pronounce for Spanish speakers, and is criticized as showing disrespect towards the Spanish language as a whole. In Latin America, terms such as Latine and Latin@ have been used to indicate gender-neutrality; however, the Royal Spanish Academy style guide does not recognize gender-neutral language for the Spanish language as grammatically correct. In English, Latin without a suffix has been proposed as an alternative to Latinx.

Among Hispanic and Latino Americans, knowledge of the term is not widespread, and reception to the term as a potential classifier for the entire Hispanic/Latino population has been overwhelmingly negative. A 2023 Pew Research Center survey found that roughly half of U.S. Hispanics were not aware of the term Latinx; of those aware of it, 75% said it should not be used to describe the Hispanic or Latino population, preferring instead the terms "Latino" and "Hispanic" by large margins.

Popular usage of the term has been generally limited, and overall reception to the term has been mixed to negative. Of U.S. Hispanic adults familiar with "Latinx", more respondents viewed increased use of the term to be a bad thing than a good thing, but a majority were indifferent or unsure. Some linguists and scholars have criticized use of the term as being an imposition of English norms on the Spanish language. Others have suggested that use of the term among politicians alienates potential Latino voters.

== Usage and pronunciation ==
Latinx as a group identity term denotes individuals in the United States who have Latin American roots. Other terms for this specific social category include Hispanic, Latino, Latina, Latine, and Latin@ (combining the letters "a" and "o" into the character @). Yet another term is simply "Latin", a gender-neutral alternative, and can be stated in the plural as Latin peoples. Latinx is used as an alternative to the gender binary inherent to formulations such as Latina/o and Latin@, and is used by and for anyone of Latin-American descent who does not identify as either male or female, or more broadly as a gender-neutral term for such.

Pronunciations of Latinx documented in dictionaries include /ləˈtiːnɛks, læ-, lɑː-, -nəks, ˈlætɪnɛks/ lə-TEE-neks, la(h)-, -nəks, LAT-in-eks. Other variants respelled ad hoc as "Latins", "La-tinks", or "Latin-equis" have been reported. Editors at Merriam-Webster write that "more than likely, there was little consideration for how [Latinx] was supposed to be pronounced when it was created."

== Origins and public usage ==
The first records of the term Latinx appear in the 21st century, but there is no certainty as to its first occurrence. According to Google Trends, it was first seen online in 2004, and first appeared in academic literature around 2013 "in a Puerto Rican psychological periodical to challenge the gender binaries encoded in the Spanish language." Contrarily, it has been claimed that usage of the term "started in online chat rooms and listservs in the 1990s" and that its first appearance in academic literature was in the Fall 2004 volume of the journal Feministas Unidas. In the rest of the United States, it was first used in activist and LGBT circles as a way to expand on earlier attempts at gender-inclusive forms of the grammatically masculine Latino, such as Latino/a and Latin@. A similar use of 'x' in the term Mx. may have been an influence or model for the development of Latinx.

Use of x to expand language can be traced to the word Chicano, which had an x added to the front of the word, making it Xicano. Scholars have identified this shift as part of the movement to empower people of Mexican origin in the U.S. and also as a means of emphasizing that the origins of the letter X and term Chicano are linked to the Indigenous Nahuatl language. The x has also been added to the end of the term Chicano, making it Chicanx. An example of this occurred at Columbia University where students changed their student group name from "Chicano Caucus" to "Chicanx Caucus" in December 2014. The following year, Columbia University changed the name of Latino Heritage Month to Latinx Hispanic Heritage Month. Salinas and Lozano (2017) state that the term is influenced by Mexican indigenous communities that have a third gender role, such as Juchitán de Zaragoza, Oaxaca (see also: Gender system § Juchitán, Oaxaca, Mexico).

Between 2004 and 2014, Latinx did not attain broad usage or attention. Awareness of the term grew in the month following the Pulse nightclub shooting of June 2016; Google Trends shows that searches for this term rose greatly in this period. The term was added to the Merriam-Webster English dictionary in 2018, as it continued to grow in popularity in the United States, and to the Oxford English Dictionary in 2019. Between 2019 and 2024, awareness for the term doubled among those who self-identified as U.S. Latinos or Hispanics.

=== Among US Hispanics/Latinos ===
Despite the increase in awareness, use of the term to describe oneself has not greatly increased over time. As of 2018, use of the term Latinx was limited nearly exclusively to the United States. Manuel Vargas writes that people from Latin America ordinarily would not think of themselves using the term unless they reside in the United States.

A 2019 poll (with a 5% margin of error) found that 2% of US residents of Latin American descent in the US preferred to use the term Latinx to describe their ethnicity, including 3% of 18–34-year-olds; the rest preferred other terms. "No respondents over [age] 50 selected the term", while overall "3% of women and 1% of men selected the term as their preferred ethnic identifier".

A 2020 Pew Research Center survey found that only 23% of US adults who self-identified as Hispanic or Latino had heard of the term Latinx. Of those, 65% said that the term Latinx should not be used to describe them, with most preferring terms such as Hispanic or Latino. While the remaining 33% of US Hispanic adults who have heard the term Latinx said it could be used to describe the community, only 10% of that subgroup preferred it to the terms Hispanic or Latino. The preferred term both among Hispanics who have heard the term and among those who have not was Hispanic, garnering 50% and 64% respectively. Latino was second in preference with 31% and 29% respectively. Only 3% self identified as Latinx in that survey.

A 2020 study based on interviews with 34 Latinx/a/o students from the US found that they "perceive higher education as a privileged space where they use the term Latinx. Once they return to their communities, they do not use the term".

A 2021 Gallup poll asked Hispanic Americans about their preference among the terms "Hispanic," "Latino" and "Latinx" for their ethnic subgroup. 57% said it did not matter, and 4% chose Latinx. In a follow-up question where they were asked which term they lean toward, 5% chose Latinx.

A 2021 poll by Democratic Hispanic outreach firm Bendixen & Amandi International found that only 2 percent of those polled refer to themselves as Latinx, while 68 percent call themselves "Hispanic" and 21 percent favored "Latino" or "Latina" to describe their ethnic background. In addition, 40 percent of those polled said Latinx bothers or offends them to some degree and 30 percent said they would be less likely to support a politician or organization that uses the term.

A 2024 Pew Research Center survey found that awareness among U.S. Latinos and Hispanics increased from 23% to 47%, but those who self-identified as Latinx only increased from 3% to 4%, roughly equal to 1.9 million people. Demographic groups including age, sexual orientation, and Afro-Latino identity show the largest distinction between users and non-users. Nonetheless, 75% of U.S. Hispanic adults in the survey opposed the use of Latinx to describe their respective population. When asked which term they preferred be used to describe people of Hispanic or Latino origin, 52% of respondents chose Hispanic, while 29% preferred the term Latino.

=== In literature and academia ===
Latinx has become commonly used by activists in American higher education and the popular media who seek to advocate for individuals on the borderlines of gender identity. Herlihy-Mera calls Latinx "a recognition of the exclusionary nature of our institutions, of the deficiencies in existent linguistic structures, and of language as an agent of social change", saying, "The gesture toward linguistic intersectionality stems from a suffix endowed with a literal intersection—x." Some commentators, such as Ed Morales, a lecturer at Columbia University and author of the 2018 book Latinx: The New Force in American Politics and Culture, associate the term with the ideas of Gloria Anzaldúa, a Chicana feminist. Morales writes that "refusal to conform to male/female gender binaries" parallels "the refusal to conform to a racial binary".

The term appears in the titles of academic books in the context of LGBT studies, rhetoric and composition studies, and comics studies. Scharrón-del Río and Aja (2015) have traced the use of Latinx by authors Beatriz Llenín Figueroa, Jaime Géliga Quiñones, Yuderkys Espinosa Miñoso, and Adriana Gallegos Dextre. The term has also been discussed in scholarly research by cultural theorist Ilan Stavans on Spanglish and by Frederick Luis Aldama and Christopher Gonzalez on Latinx super heroes in mainstream comics and Latinx graphic novels such as United States of Banana. The term and concept of Latinx is also explored by Antonio Pastrana Jr., Juan Battle and Angelique Harris on LBGTQ+ issues. Valdes also uses the term in research on black perspectives on Latinx. Despite the extensive use of the term across academic texts, Salinas and Lozano (2019) write that authors often lack definitions for the term within their texts.

Jeffrey Herlihy-Mera writes that in Puerto Rico, the "shift toward x in reference to people has already occurred" in limited academic settings and "for many faculty [in the humanities department at the University of Puerto Rico] hermanx and niñx and their equivalents have been the standard ... for years. It is clear that the inclusive approach to nouns and adjectives is becoming more common, and while it may at some point become the prevailing tendency, presently there is no prescriptive control toward either syntax".

Several student-run organizations at academic institutions have used the word in their title. At Princeton University the Latinx Perspective Organization was founded in 2016 to "unify Princeton's diverse Latinx community" and several student-run organizations at other institutions have used the word in their title. The University of California, Berkeley, has established the Latinx Research Center, "a faculty-led research hub...that is home to cutting-edge research about the diverse Latinx community of the U.S." Conversely, a 2020 analysis found "that community college professional organizations have by and large not adopted the term Latinx, even by [sic] organizations with a Latinx/a/o centered mission", although some academic journals and dissertations about community colleges were using it.

=== In politics ===
Some U.S. Republicans argue that the word is a product of liberal "wokeism". In January 2023, Republican Governor of Arkansas Sarah Huckabee Sanders issued the Executive Order to Respect the Latino Community by Eliminating Culturally Insensitive words from Official Use in Government, banning the use of Latinx in official Arkansas government communications.

Some U.S. Democrats argue that the term disfigures the Spanish language and is an act of cultural appropriation. In February 2023, a group of Hispanic Connecticut lawmakers, including five Democrats, proposed a similar ban on formal state documents, calling the term offensive to Spanish speakers. State Representative Geraldo Reyes Jr., who introduced the measure, called the term "offensive and unnecessary". Democratic Senator Ruben Gallego, who represented a majority-Hispanic congressional district in Arizona before 2025, advises Democrats not to use the term. Members of the Congressional Hispanic Caucus are hesitant to use the term until after usage continues to evolve to make it more common, according to California representative Raul Ruiz.

Democrats have utilized Latinx far more often, particularly on social media where 47% of Democrats of the 116th Congress used the term across Twitter and Facebook posts compared to just 1% of Republican lawmakers. On June 26, 2019, during the first 2020 Democratic Party presidential debate, the word was used by the presidential candidate Elizabeth Warren, who is not Hispanic or Latina, which USA Today called "one of the highest profile uses of the term since its conception".

Matthew Yglesias of Vox, discussing Donald Trump's gains among Hispanic voters in the 2020 United States presidential election, stated that for Democrats, while other factors played a larger role, the term "is, if nothing else, a symptom of the problem, which is a tendency to privilege academic concepts and linguistic innovations in addressing social justice concerns." He says that "[t]he message of the term ... is that the entire grammatical system of the Spanish language is problematic, which in any other context progressives would recognize as an alienating and insensitive message."

In 2023, U.S. Florida House Representative, Maria Elvira Salazar, introduced a proposed addendum to the Financial Services and General Government Appropriations Bill. The bill would ban the usage of "Latinx" on official government documents. In November of 2023, Florida House Representatives passed the bill, 222-198, effectively banning the term.

== Reception ==
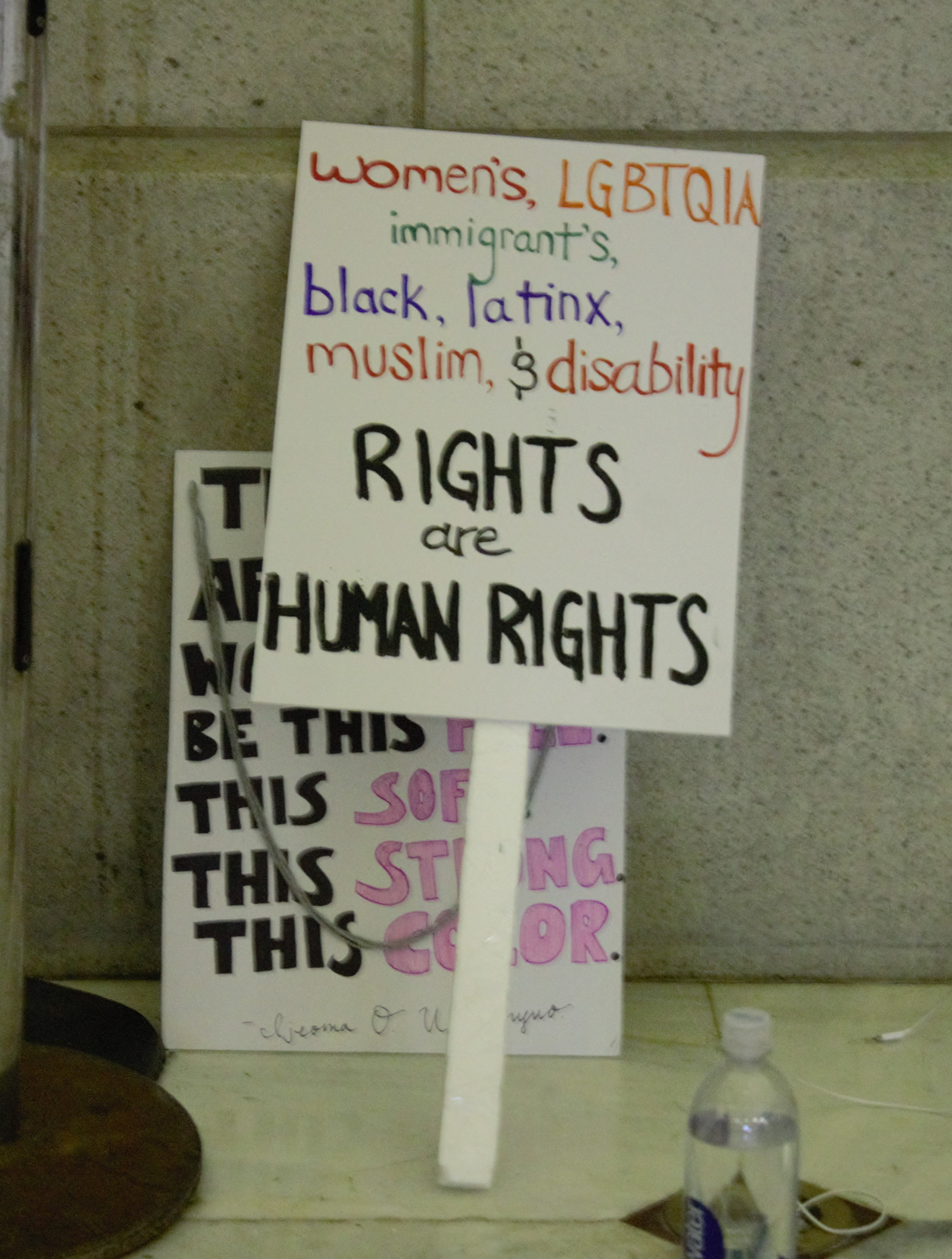
Sign at the Women's March on Washington. The sign reads, "women's, LGBTQIA, immigrant's [sic], black, Latinx, Muslim, & disability rights are human rights".

Latinx has been the subject of controversy. "Linguistic imperialism" has been used as a basis of both criticism and support and the term has been rejected by many members of the Hispanic and Latino or Latin communities. Ilan Stavans has called the term "an affectation."

In 2018, the Royal Spanish Academy rejected the use of -x and -e as gender-neutral alternatives to the collective masculine -o ending, in a style manual published together with the Asociación de Academias de la Lengua Española (ASALE). Regarding this decision, Darío Villanueva, RAE's director said, "The problem is we're confusing grammar with machismo." According to HuffPost, some refuse to use the term on the grounds that Latinx is difficult to pronounce in the Spanish language.

Linguists Janet M. Fuller and Jennifer Leeman state that some people reject the use of Latinx to refer to people regardless of gender because they see it as a one-size-fits-all term that erases diversity, preferring to switch between -o/-a/-x when referring to specific individuals. Those who oppose the term in its entirety have argued that the -x is artificial, unpronounceable, an imposition of English norms on Spanish, or overly faddish.

Many non-binary Latinos whose first language is not English have also criticized the term on the basis that it caters more to Latin Americans who are fluent in English and can pronounce the -x ending easily while ignoring gender neutral alternatives already employed by Latin American activists, such as -e (Latine).

Linguist John McWhorter argues that, in contrast to other neologisms such as African American, Latinx has not become mainstream as of 2019 because the problem of implied gender it aims to solve is more a concern of the intelligentsia than the "proverbial person on the street".

According to HuffPost, "Many opponents of the term have suggested that using an un-gendered noun like Latinx is disrespectful to the Spanish language and some have even called the term 'a blatant form of linguistic imperialism'". Defending usage of the term against critics arguing linguistic imperialism, Brooklyn College professors María R. Scharrón-del Río and Alan A. Aja argue that the Spanish language itself is a form of linguistic imperialism for Latin Americans.

Another argument against Latinx is that "it erases feminist movements in the 1970s" that fought for use of the word Latina to represent women, according to George Cadava, Director of the Latina and Latino Studies program at Northwestern University.

Writing for Latino Rebels, Hector Luis Alamo describes the term as a "bulldozing of Spanish". In a 2015 article published by the outlet as part of a debate on the term, Alamo wrote: "If we dump Latino for Latinx because it offends some people, then we should go on dumping words forever since there will always be some people who find some words offensive."

Wayne State University professor Nicole Trujillo-Pagán has argued that patriarchal bias is reproduced in ostensibly "gender neutral" language and stated, "Less clear in the debate (as it has developed since then) is how the replacement silences and erases long-standing struggles to recognize the significance of gender difference and sexual violence."

Laura E. Perez, ethnic studies professor at University of California, Berkeley, believes using Latinx encourages discussions and "enacts inclusivity through out language use. A 2021, University of California, Berkeley, Institute of Governmental Studies (IGS) poll found 25% of U.S. born Latinos in California identify as being Latinx.

A 2019 National Survey of Latinos found that only 3 percent of Hispanic-Latinos have ever used "Latinx" to describe themselves. The League of United Latin American Citizens announced in 2021 that it would stop using the term in its official communications, calling it "very unliked" by nearly all Latinos. A 2024 study found that use of the term Latinx by Democratic politicians alienates Latino voters from the party, and that Latino voters are less likely to support Democrats who use Latinx than those who use Latino in their otherwise identical messaging.

Skepticism behind the term's inclusivity has also been posited. Florida Atlantic University professor Cristobal Salinas Jr. argues that, despite being connected to Indigenous cultures and languages, the term is not inclusive of Indigenous cultures outside of Mexico, where the letter "x" is not part of their respective vocabularies. Additionally, Salinas Jr. contends that the term's inconsistent usage across texts defending the term's inclusivity of LGBTQ people "has created confusion between gender and sexual identity".

A 2023 Pew Research Center survey polled U.S. Latino adults familiar with "Latinx" on whether they thought increased usage of the term is a good or bad thing. A majority of respondents were either indifferent or unsure (38% and 14%, respectively), while 36% said it was a bad thing and 12% said it was good.

== Similar terms ==
Similar gender-neutral forms have also arisen. One such term is Latin@, which combines the written form of the ⟨-a⟩ and ⟨-o⟩ endings. Similar terms include Chicanx and the variant spelling Xicanx.

Latine (plural: Latines) as a gender-neutral term is less prevalent than Latinx within the U.S., although the opposite is true throughout the Spanish-speaking world. In the U.S., "Latine" arose out of genderqueer speakers' use of the ending ⟨-e⟩; similar forms include amigue ('friend') and elle (singular they). In Argentina, efforts to increase gender neutrality in Spanish have utilized both grammatical genders together, as well as ⟨-@⟩ and ⟨-x⟩ endings. According to The New York Times, the ⟨-e⟩ ending has been more widely adopted because it is easier to pronounce.

In Portuguese, the use of Latino(a), with parentheses, is preferred over Latino/a, with a slash.The use of the at sign has been registered since, at least, 1990s in Brazil. The -x inflection is proposed in 2006.

== See also ==
- Feminist language reform
- Gender neutrality in languages with grammatical gender
- Gender neutrality in English
- Grammatical gender in Spanish
- Gender neutrality in Portuguese
- Hispanic–Latino naming dispute
- Mx (title)
- Spanish orthography
- Womxn
- Womyn

== Notes ==
- Vargas, Manuel (2018). "Latinx Philosophy". In Zalta, Edward N. (ed.). Stanford Encyclopedia of Philosophy (Winter 2018 ed.). Metaphysics Research Lab, Stanford University. ISSN 1095-5054. OCLC 643092515.
