= The Crossing (video game) =

Cancelled video game

- Developer: Arkane Studios
- Engine: Source
- Platforms: Microsoft Windows, Xbox 360
- Release: Cancelled
- Genre: First-person shooter
- Modes: Single-player, multiplayer

The Crossing is a cancelled first-person shooter video game by Arkane Studios, which attempted to fuse single-player and multiplayer by threading its single-player campaign through live multiplayer games.

The game was first announced on 9 January 2007, but put "on hold" on 15 May 2009 after the company ran into "an unexpected financial challenge" and decided to focus on smaller projects. The Crossing was later officially cancelled for Arkane Studios to work on LMNO with Electronic Arts and Steven Spielberg, which was also cancelled.

== Gameplay ==
Two campaign players bear down on a weaker team deathmatch player.

The Crossing was to be a first-person shooter which supported a narrative-driven single-player game, but with the player's opponents replaced by human-controlled agents via a multi-player system, an approach called "crossplayer" by Arkane. In this single-player mode, the single player would work through a game level amid the conflict of a team-based deathmatch game, with teams assigned to either protect or assassinate the character controlled by the single player. The game also was to include a team-based multiplayer mode called skirmish, which is also incorporated into the single-player campaign, where the main player might try to avoid the skirmish.

== Plot ==
The game incorporated the idea of parallel universes, and was to be set across two vastly different renditions of modern day Paris. In one universe, which shares many aesthetic similarities to our own, Paris has descended into chaos following the collapse of government. In the other, the timeline diverged in 1307; where instead of being disbanded, the Knights Templar seize control of the French crown. The story takes the player across both universes.

== Development ==
The idea of The Crossing was to try to find a way to fuse a narrative-driven single player game with multiplayer elements, with human-controlled players to take the place of some of the enemies in the single-player campaign. This amalgamation was dubbed "crossplayer" by Arkane. Raphaël Colantonio, Arkane's chief executive officer at the time, said that as a studio they wanted to try a multiplayer game, but felt the standard multiplayer approach in most games was "pointless" and wanted to explore a different formula.

This approach necessitated level designs that had the single player navigating through linear sections of levels until they reached a choke point where they would encounter the team-based multiplayer battles. During the player traversing linear sections, the game would have brought the multiplayer teams to spawn into or near the upcoming choke point, so that these players would always feel close to the core action of the game. According to Colantonio, this approach required them to rethink how they designed levels; they recognized that they needed to continue to drive the single player forward through the level, unable to have them stop to solve puzzles or analyze enemy movements, while also making some of the choke point areas interesting for the other players.

For the game's story and setting, Arkane wanted to create a new intellectual property (IP) for them to build on. Colantonio brought in Viktor Antonov, an artist that had been working for Valve and had helped Arkane with the Source engine during their development of Dark Messiah of Might and Magic (2006). As both Colantonio and Antonov had lived in Paris for some time in their lives, they came upon the idea of a "dystopia-utopia" setting in Paris, where part of the city was a "royal utopia" while the other half had fallen into squalor; this reflected on the different experiences that Colantonio and Antonov had from how they came to live in Paris, and recognizing that Paris itself is a "city of contrasts". As a backstory, they envisioned a world where scientists had developed time travel through various portals, and used it to change the past and create alternate dimensions in the present, then taking the best of technology advancements from that to improve the original reality. The Crossing would have started when an incident involving misuse of the time travel portal in the center of Paris would have created a cacophony of different versions of Paris. The player discovers that Knights Templar with high-tech weapons have invaded Paris, and would be forced to find the portal to try to set things right.

With some of the gameplay and the narrative down, Arkane began talking about the game with the gaming press, including a cover story on Games for Windows, generating interest in the title, but had not yet secured a publisher. Colantonio pitched the idea to the core 20 publishers at that time, but none of them expressed interest in the idea as a whole, instead talking about focusing only on parts of The Crossing such as using the narrative in another gameplay setting, or having only focus on the single-player. Colantonio stated that these publishers were also concerned about Arkane seeking to focus on the personal computer release over consoles, and the lack of plans for a PlayStation 3 port, at the time, a limitation of the Source engine having yet to be ported to that console. The publishers also expressed concern about the matchmaking capabilities of the game; Arkane brought in Max Hoberman, who developed the Halo 2 matchmaking system, to try to alleviate publisher fears. A further challenge from publishers according to Colantonio was the high development costs they wanted, looking for between US$15 million and US$20 million, which was an expensive budget for a game at that time particularly from a studio that had yet to establish its own identity.

Eventually, Arkane found one unnamed publisher that was interested in the entire concept of The Crossing. They spent about six months negotiating with this publisher, but Colantonio said as time progressed, the negotiations worsened, with a smaller proposed budget and requiring them to do a PlayStation 3 version. Colantonio decided after six months that they were not going to be able to achieve the vision they wanted with The Crossing, and ceased negotiations with the publisher, effectively shelving the game. Arkane switched over to continue contract work with Valve, and started work with Electronic Arts on a Steven Spielberg-backed game, LMNO, itself which was ultimately cancelled.

While The Crossing never came to fruition, Colantonio said that it was an important foundation of Arkane Studio as it helped with team-building, establishing a vision for their own IP, and the processes needed to carry that out, which they used in building the Dishonored series. During the 2018 QuakeCon, Arkane's lead designer Ricardo Bare stated that their future projects were looking at multiplayer functionality that they had been envisioning in The Crossing as to provide seamless multiplayer functionality alongside single-player content. Arkane would later implement this functionality with their 2021 game Deathloop.
