= Edward Lerner =

Edward Lerner may refer to:

- Ned Lerner (fl. 1983–present), video game designer
- Edward M. Lerner (born 1949), American author of science fiction, techno-thrillers, and popular science
