= Marvel's Blade =

Upcoming action-adventure game

- Artwork depicting Blade
- Developer: Arkane Studios
- Publisher: Bethesda Softworks
- Directors: Dinga Bakaba; Sebastien Mitton
- Designer: Dana Nightingale
- Artist: Sebastien Mitton
- Engine: Void Engine
- Genre: Action-adventure
- Mode: Single player

Marvel's Blade is an upcoming action-adventure game developed by Arkane Studios and published by Bethesda Softworks. Based on the Marvel Comics character Blade, it will feature an original narrative that draws from the character's comic book mythology, while additionally deriving from various appearances in other media. The story follows superhuman vampire hunter Eric Brooks, known among his peers as "Blade", as he attempts to stave off a vampiric invasion in Paris while struggling with his origins among both the undead and the living.

Arkane Studios entered development on their next game following the release of Deathloop (2021) in January 2022, subsequently pitching to Bethesda and being selected by Marvel Games to produce a video game around the character. The game was announced in December 2023 and went into full production by the following year.

== Synopsis ==
=== Characters and setting ===
The game follows Eric Brooks / Blade, a dhampir known as "The Daywalker" who has sworn his life to the complete eradication of vampires in memory of his mother, who died at the hands of one on the day of his birth. A core theme is Blade's struggle to balance his humanity with his vampiric heritage, necessary to battle the undead but which also ostracizes him from human society. The game's narrative takes him to a quarantine zone in the middle of Paris, France that has become overrun by a colony of fearsome vampires, who have taken to preying on the human survivors while seeking to entrench themselves to invade the rest of the city.

== Gameplay ==
Marvel's Blade is a narrative-driven, third-person action-adventure title, representing a departure from previous games developed by Arkane Studios which were usually played from a first-person perspective.

== Development ==
Arkane Lyon, the French-based development division of Arkane Studios known for their work on the Dishonored series and Deathloop (2021), had begun preliminary work on their next project by January 2022, by which point Deathloop's campaign designer, Dana Nightingale, had been tapped to serve as their new game's campaign director. During this period, Arkane Lyon creative director Dinga Bakaba and art director Sebastien Mitton were offered the opportunity to collaborate with Marvel Games, as the firm had been in the midst of licensing out their characters to external developers in a commitment to renew their focus on AAA titles. The pair pitched their vision of a standalone game focusing on Blade, which was responded to enthusiastically by Marvel Games' vice president Bill Rosemann, claiming that "The Arkane touch fits Blade like his trademark trenchcoat." The prospects of the title similarly excited Bethesda Softworks' former vice president Pete Hines. Arkane's game marks the first title focused on the character since the video game tie-ins to the Blade films by New Line Cinema, as well as the character's first standalone appearance in an original video game not tied to other media.

Marvel's Blade was announced with a cinematic trailer during The Game Awards 2023 on December 7, 2023. Bakaba spoke on Blade's character and the resonance he instilled on him as someone who also shared his mixed background and that he was excited to place the character in his hometown of Paris as the game's setting, stating that he considered the studio's chance to interpret the material their own way a dream of his, as well as "a challenge that our team embraces with a passion." Co-creative and art director Sebastien Mitton remarked on approaching a character like Blade as an opportunity to push Arkane's art direction into "even more modern and bold territory". The game had entered full production at Arkane Lyon by late 2024 according to a financial briefing from the studio. In June 2026, Bethesda Game Studios executive producer Todd Howard offered an update to Entertainment Weekly, praising Arkane Studios' work on the game after being shown footage of it the prior month. Despite this, it was reported on June 30 that Microsoft was considering canceling the game and either shutting down or selling Arkane Studios.

In November 2026 as negotiations remained ongoing for Xbox's divestiture from Arkane Studios, the company's workers union provided a statement to Video Games Chronicle alleging that Xbox contributed to multiple internal delays to the game's launch by freezing their ability to hire more developers for over a year, while describing the move as an extension of Microsoft's broader objective for optimizing profits. The union representative also outlined a list of goals for Xbox including Arkane having a final say in their potential investor or a higher redundancy in the event they were shuttered.

== Release ==
An untitled licensed game from Bethesda Softworks was mentioned in the publisher's internal roadmap documents as slated for the 2024 fiscal year ending September 30, 2024. At this time, Bethesda had already been selected by Disney to publish Indiana Jones and the Great Circle (2024). As both games used respective licenses owned by Disney and developed by first-party studios part of Xbox, senior VP of Global Games and Interactive Experiences at Disney Sean Shoptaw stated that whether Marvel's Blade launched as exclusive to Windows and Xbox consoles like the Indiana Jones title was for Bethesda to decide. (Note: Despite initially being planned as an Xbox console exclusive, Indiana Jones and the Great Circle was later released for PlayStation 5 in April 2025.)

In June 2026, it was reported by The Verge that ahead of the Xbox division's planned mass-layoffs following the fiscal year, Microsoft was weighing the closure of five studios under their umbrella, including Arkane which would coincide with the cancellation of Marvel's Blade. According to writer Tom Warren, the game had been internally delayed to a late 2027 launch window with plans to show the game later in 2026, and was running over budget. Microsoft was also said to be exploring options for spinning out Arkane Studios from Bethesda and Xbox. Later that month, it was reported that Arkane had begun the process of consulting on future strategic options for the studio such as selling to an investor or spinning off into independence, in compliance with French labor laws. In October, it was reported that Microsoft had given Arkane Studios until November 13, 2026 to secure a new buyer or finalize a solution for returning to independent management before facing a potential closure. An Xbox spokesperson subsequently provided a statement to PC Gamer that same month, stating that the deadline had been internally extended by one month while they worked with the studio and the Works Council on further steps.
