= FireTeam (video game) =

1998 video game

- Developers: Multitude, Inc.
- Publishers: NA: Multitude, Inc.; EU: Cryo Interactive
- Director: Art Min
- Producer: Bill Money
- Designers: Harvey Smith; Ned Lerner
- Platform: Microsoft Windows
- Release: NA: December 14, 1998; EU: October 1999
- Genre: Action Strategy
- Mode: Multiplayer

FireTeam is a 1998 video game developed by Multitude, Inc. for Windows.

== Gameplay ==
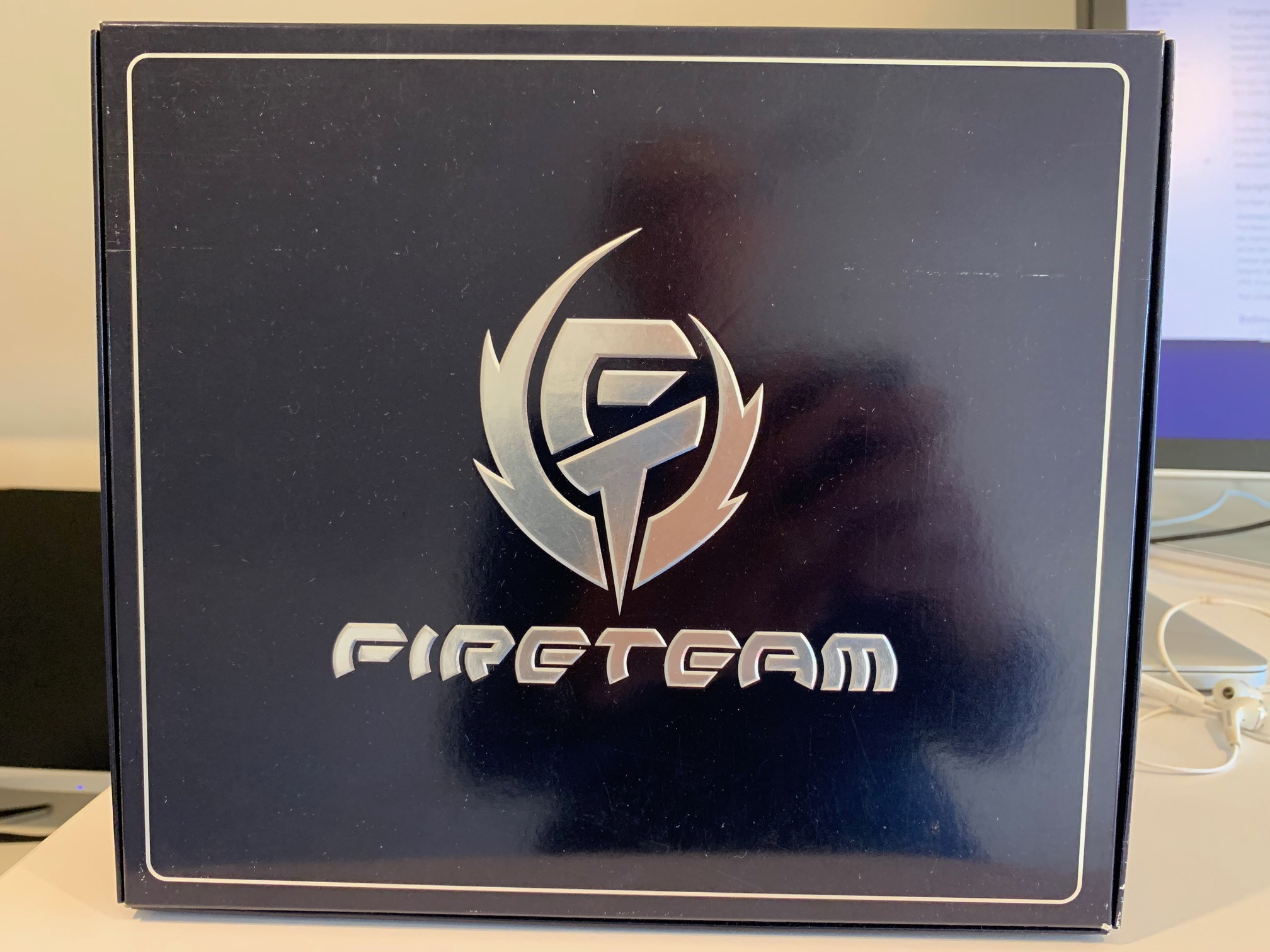
The original FireTeam box.

The game has three offline training sessions for player to familiarize themselves with the basics of the game. The rest of the content can only be played in the online multiplayer. The multiplayer consists of short matches with a time limit of 10 minutes each. There are four different game modes for the matches: Deathmatch, BaseTag, Gunball, and Capture the Flag. Players pick one of three characters to play in the game: a light-armoured scout, a commando, or an offensive oriented gunner. The chosen class can be switched while the player is dead in the game. The game initially contained 32 maps separated by the four games modes, but intended to add more maps to the game in the future.

Between matches players can talk in chat rooms to strategize. Included in the box with the purchase of the game was a headset for use with the game's real-time voice chat.

== Development ==
FireTeam was designed by Ned Lerner, Art Min, and James Morris (creator of the Panasonic M2 graphics libraries, programming tools, and operating system). The gameplay was a deliberate attempt to adapt the dynamics of MicroProse's X-COM series to a real-time environment.

Early news coverage of the game tended to center on its ability to let players talk to each other online without voice modems, and Multitude acquired patents on portions of the voice technology. The developers ran a 40,000 person beta test before focusing on the voice technology, turning FireTeam into Firetalk.

A single-player campaign had been planned, to be developed by the just-founded Irrational Games, but this was dropped before release.

== Reception ==
Reception

Aggregate score
Aggregator	Score
GameRankings	75%

Review scores
Publication	Score
Computer Games Strategy Plus	4/5
Computer Gaming World	4/5
EP Daily	7.5/10
Eurogamer	8/10
GamePro	4.5/5
GameRevolution	B
GameSpot	8.5/10
Jeuxvideo.com	14/20
PC Accelerator	6/10
PC Gamer (US)	45%

The game received favorable reviews according to the review aggregation website GameRankings. Michael E. Ryan of GameSpot highly praised the many nuances to the gameplay and the friendly, helpful player community and said that the voice communication gives FireTeam a stronger social aspect than most online games, in addition to serving as a useful gameplay element. However, he also said the training missions are grossly insufficient at preparing the player for the game, the gameplay and voice suffer from lag times, and that there were so far few players online at any given time. PC Magazine's preview was pleased with 10 minute time limit on sessions and the easy to learn yet tough to master gameplay. PC Accelerator's John Lee wrote that he appreciated the voice chat and templay aspects of the game, but said these two features were "not enough to carry the game," noting the 10 minute time limit was too short and repeating the same arcade modes quickly became repetitive. Like Ryan, he stated the game didn't offer enough practice before forcing players into the online multiplayer.

The game was a commercial failure, with sales of 1,500 units by March 1999.

The game was a finalist for Computer Games Strategy Plus' 1998 "Online Game of the Year" award, which ultimately went to Starsiege: Tribes. The staff described it as "excellent".
