= Arkane Studios =

French video game developer

Arkane Studios SASU
- Type: Subsidiary
- Industry: Video games
- Founded: 1 October 1999; 27 years ago
- Founder: Raphaël Colantonio
- Headquarters: Lyon, France
- Key people: Jerk Gustafsson (President); Dinga Bakaba (studio director and co-creative director); Sébastien Mitton (co-creative director and art director)
- Products: Arx Fatalis; Dishonored series; Marvel's Blade
- Number of employees: 150 (2020)
- Parent: ZeniMax Media (2010–present)
- Website: arkane-studios.com

Arkane Studios SASU is a French video game developer based in Lyon. Founded in 1999, it released its first game, Arx Fatalis, in 2002. The studio is best known for creating the Dishonored series and developing Deathloop, a standalone game set in the same universe. Its next game, Marvel's Blade, is in development as of early 2026.

Besides the Lyon location, Arkane Studios also operated Arkane Austin in Austin, Texas, from July 2006 until its closure in May 2024.

== History ==
=== Founding ===
Raphaël Colantonio had been part of the French offices of Electronic Arts (EA) during the 1990s, as part of the quality assurance and localisation team for some of Origin Systems' titles including System Shock. In the late 1990s, Colantonio noted there had been a change in EA as with the release of the PlayStation, the company had shown more interest in sports titles and eschewing non-sports titles from companies like Origin. Colantonio left the company, and after a brief time at Infogrames, was able to co-found Arkane with financial help from his uncle, with their first goal to make a second sequel to Ultima Underworld: The Stygian Abyss. Colantonio was among the eleven founders, of whom six were developers, when the company was established on 1 October 1999 in Lyon, France, with an investment of 1,150,000 French francs (equivalent to €270,000 in 2025).

=== 2000s ===
While Colantonio had support from Paul Neurath, one of the original developers of Ultima Underworld, EA, who owned the rights, would not allow Arkane to make a sequel with its intellectual property unless he accepted some of its provisions. Colantonio refused to accept this and instead had Arkane set out on a game in the spirit of Ultima Underworld, Arx Fatalis. Colantonio had difficulty in getting a publisher; with finances nearly exhausted, they had signed one small publisher who had gone bankrupt within the month, but later secured JoWooD Productions for publication, eventually releasing in 2002. While the game was well received, it was considered a commercial failure.

Arkane Studios logo (2006–2020)

Arx Fatalis's critical praise gave Arkane the opportunity for them to work with Valve to develop a new title on their Source engine, and Colantonio opted to make a sequel, Arx Fatalis 2. However, the poor sales of the first game made it difficult to find a publisher; They were approached by Ubisoft and asked to apply the Arx Fatalis game engine to their Might and Magic. This became Dark Messiah of Might and Magic, released in October 2006. It refined the first-person melee combat of Arx Fatalis with a lesser emphasis on role-playing elements. During this time, Colantonio moved from France to Austin, Texas leaving the main studio in the hands of his colleagues while he set up Arkane Austin in June 2006. Over the next several years, most of the development work was done out of the Lyon studio where production costs were cheaper due to beneficial economic conditions, while the Austin studio was used for establishing relationships with other studios as to generate work-for-hire projects to augment Arkane's own projects.

Between 2006 and 2007, the company was working in conjunction with Valve to develop a spinoff game in the Half-Life series called Ravenholm, expanding on work that Warren Spector's Junction Point Studios had done previously. While Arkane and Valve had worked together to produce about nine to ten levels for a playable alpha build, the project was cancelled, believed to be due to lateness and cost of the project to date. On completion of Dark Messiah, Arkane started development of a new first-person shooter title, The Crossing using the Source engine. Colantonio described The Crossing as "crossplayer", having principally single-player gameplay but influenced by online multiplayer elements. The title had a budget of around $15 million, which made it difficult to find a publisher that did not include strict rules and requirements in the contract. While Colantonio had finally found one offer that was satisfactory to him, the studio was approached by EA to help work on LMNO, a game it was developing with Steven Spielberg; as EA's offer was more valuable and more stable, Colantonio decided to cancel The Crossing to focus the studio on LMNO. However, about two years after this, EA opted to cancel LMNO as well, forcing Arkane to take up assisting roles for a few years. This including developing the multiplayer component of Activision's Call of Duty: World at War, and helping with "design, animation, and art" for 2K Marin's BioShock 2.

While trying to grow the Austin studio, Colantonio met with Harvey Smith, a game developer that he had first met earlier in his career and kept in contact with. Colantonio and Smith recognised they had several similar talents and initially felt that the two of them working in the same studio would be too troublesome, but they then considered if they were working on the same game together how their talents would mesh well. They quickly devised a "ninja pitch" that would tie into the basis of Dishonored, and worked out how they would share responsibilities at the studio. Smith formally came on board Arkane in 2008.

=== 2010s ===
Entering into 2010 with no game of their own, and their contract work having started to run down, the studio was preparing to let go of its staff to conserve costs. They were approached by Bethesda Softworks, who had an idea of a stealth-based game set in feudal Japan which they wanted to name Dishonored, and felt Arkane's talents were ideal for the job and wanted to contract them for the title. According to Colantonio, Bethesda's vice-president of development Todd Vaughn had seen Arkane's work in Arx Fatalis and its sequel, and while Bethesda had been interested in these, it did not react fast enough before Arkane had taken another route. Vaughn told Arkane that they were interested in publishing a first-person immersive game, and Arkane was the only option they had. Colantonio recognised Bethesda was the best fit for Arkane, considering the similarities between Arx Fatalis and The Elder Scrolls games. Arkane worked under contract for a few months but soon were fully acquired by ZeniMax Media, Bethesda's parent, by August 2010, as part of ZeniMax's larger growth after having recently acquired id Software. With financial backing and a parent company that appreciated good game design, Arkane had the time and creative freedom to revamp Bethesda's original concept for Dishonored based on the pitch that Colantonio and Smith had earlier developed, and moved the setting from Japan to one inspired by London while retaining the Dishonored name and stealth aspects. Dishonored was released in 2012.

Smith moved to France to lead the Lyon studio in the sequel Dishonored 2 which was released in November 2016, while Colantonio stayed at the Austin studio to lead the development of Prey, a spiritual sequel of both System Shock and Arx Fatalis, that was released in 2017. Prey shared its name only with the intellectual property that ZeniMax had acquired from Human Head Studios and its 2006 Prey and cancelled Prey 2 games.

In June 2017, about two months following Prey's release, Colantonio announced he was stepping down as president of Arkane. He said in a statement: "It is time for me to step out to spend some time with my son and reflect on what is important to me and my future." Smith took over management of the Austin studio, while Colantonio stayed with the Lyon studio to help transition it to new management.

Arkane assisted other ZeniMax studios as they finished off support for Dishonored 2 and Prey; these included supporting Bethesda Game Studios for Fallout 76, and MachineGames in level design for Wolfenstein: Youngblood and Wolfenstein: Cyberpilot. During Bethesda's E3 2019 press conference, Arkane Lyon unveiled its next game, Deathloop, a science-fiction based first-person shooter with the player-character stuck in a time loop.

=== 2020s ===
ZeniMax Media was acquired by Microsoft for US$7.5 billion in March 2021, consolidating Arkane Studios within Microsoft Gaming alongside other development teams under Bethesda Softworks. As part of the arrangement for acquiring ZeniMax, Microsoft honored existing contractual agreements the publisher had made with other platform holders, including Deathloop's launch as a timed console exclusive for PlayStation 5, which released that September.

Following the release of Deathloop, Romuald Capron, head of Arkane Lyon for seventeen years, announced in October 2021 he was stepping down and with Dinga Bakaba, Sébastien Mitton, Hugues Tardif and Morgan Barbe left in charge of managing the studio. Capron stated that he felt "the need to try something new" and "my goal is to keep on helping video game companies, and others, to make their creative vision become a reality, since that’s what I love to do". Bakaba was named as the studio head for Arkane Lyon in November 2021.

In May 2023, Arkane Austin released the co-op first-person shooter title Redfall. Approximately 70% of the Austin team who had worked on Prey would be gone by the time Redfall's development was complete. At the Game Awards 2023, Arkane Lyon announced Marvel's Blade in collaboration with Marvel Games and Bethesda Softworks, based on the Marvel Comics character of the same name. It will be a third-person action-adventure game, representing a departure from the first-person perspective-driven action titles previously developed by Arkane.

Microsoft closed several internal studios within ZeniMax, including Arkane Austin, on May 7, 2024, ending further development of Redfall. The closure reportedly came as a surprise to developers, who were notified by Matt Booty in an email memo. Before the closure, developers at Arkane Austin were continuing to work on the delayed 'Hero Pass' content for Redfall, which was due for release on Halloween 2024. The closure of the studio resulted in 96 job losses.

In June 2026, it was reported that ahead of significant layoffs scheduled to take place at the Xbox division following the fiscal year, that Microsoft was weighing the closure of five first-party studios under their umbrella including Arkane Studios, which would coincide with cancelling Marvel's Blade. The game was reportedly delayed from a late 2026 launch to the following year and was running over budget. Microsoft was also said to be exploring options for spinning Arkane out of Bethesda and Xbox. Later that month, it was reported that Microsoft had initiated the process of beginning to divest from Arkane Studios while searching for an investor and consulting on a potential spin off, a process that was said to last for months due to French labor laws. According to Le Monde, Arkane would need to find a buyer before November 13, 2026, or else Microsoft would shutter the studio; unions are trying to extend the deadline. According to Bloomberg, multiple companies, including Ubisoft, were in discussions with Xbox as of November 2026 regarding the potential acquisition of Arkane Studios.

== Games developed ==
Year	Title	Platform(s)	Publisher(s)	Notes
2002	Arx Fatalis	Windows, Xbox	JoWooD Productions	
2006	Dark Messiah of Might and Magic	Windows, Xbox 360	Ubisoft	
2009	KarmaStar	iOS	Majesco	
2012	Dishonored	PlayStation 3, PlayStation 4, Windows, Xbox 360, Xbox One	Bethesda Softworks	
2016	Dishonored 2	PlayStation 4, Windows, Xbox One	Bethesda Softworks	First title to be developed separately by Arkane Lyon
2017	Prey	PlayStation 4, Windows, Xbox One	Bethesda Softworks	Developed by Arkane Austin
2017	Dishonored: Death of the Outsider	PlayStation 4, Windows, Xbox One	Bethesda Softworks	Developed by Arkane Lyon
2019	Wolfenstein: Youngblood	Nintendo Switch, PlayStation 4, Windows, Xbox One	Bethesda Softworks	Co-developed by Arkane Lyon with MachineGames
2019	Wolfenstein: Cyberpilot	PlayStation 4, Windows	Bethesda Softworks	Co-developed by Arkane Lyon with MachineGames
2021	Deathloop	PlayStation 5, Windows, Xbox Series X/S	Bethesda Softworks	Developed by Arkane Lyon
2023	Redfall	Windows, Xbox Series X/S	Bethesda Softworks	Developed by Arkane Austin and Roundhouse Studios; final game developed by Arkane Austin.
TBA	Marvel's Blade	TBA	Bethesda Softworks	

In addition to developing with third-party game engines, such as using Unreal 3 for the first Dishonored and CryEngine for Prey, the studio has also developed their own Void Engine based on a heavily modified version of the id Tech 5 Engine. The Void Engine has powered Dishonored 2 and Deathloop. According to Dishonored 2's art director Sébastien Mitton, Void uses about 20% of id Tech 5, the rest rewritten to have larger and denser maps.

=== Cancelled games ===
Year	Title	Platform(s)	Publisher(s)
2007	Return to Ravenholm	—N/a	Valve
2009	The Crossing	Windows, Xbox 360	—N/a
2010	LMNO	Windows	Electronic Arts
