= Harvey Smith (game designer) =

American video game designer and writer

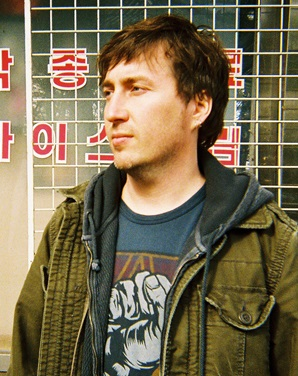
- Smith in Seoul, 2006
- Born: 1966 (age 59–60)
- Other name: Witchboy
- Occupations: Video game designer, writer
- Years active: 1993–present
- Known for: Deus Ex; Dishonored

Harvey Smith (born 1966) is an American video game designer and writer, who worked at Arkane Studios from 2008 until the closure of its Austin branch in 2024.

Smith has lectured in various places around the world on topics such as level design, emergent gameplay, leadership, game unit differentiation, future trends and interactive narrative. At the Game Developers Conference in 2006, Smith won the Game Designer's Challenge: Nobel Peace Prize, for his design featuring a mobile video game that facilitates political social action.

== Early life ==
Smith was born and raised on the Texas Gulf Coast. He grew up playing games like Pong as well as Dungeons & Dragons. He read books by Ursula K. Le Guin, William Faulkner, Vladimir Nabokov and Roger Zelazny, among others. He served six years in the U.S. Air Force, including tours in Germany and Saudi Arabia. Smith moved to Austin at the behest of a friend to try his hand at video game design.

== Career ==
Early in his career, Smith worked in quality assurance (QA) at the Austin-based Origin Systems, where he became the QA lead for games including Super Wing Commander and System Shock. In 1995, Smith became an associate producer for Ultima VIII, working with co-founder of Origin, Richard Garriott. Smith then pitched his own game, Technosaur, a real time strategy game inspired by Dune that would have featured "cybernetically augmented velociraptors". The project was canceled by publisher Electronic Arts after 18 months of work.

After leaving Origin in 1996, Harvey Smith went to work at Multitude where they released FireTeam.

After Multitude, Smith's game development career continued in Austin, Texas working with Warren Spector at Ion Storm as lead designer on Deus Ex as well as its sequel, Deus Ex: Invisible War. After this he unsuccessfully pitched a further game in the Thief series, to be called Thief: Modern, in which central character Garrett lived in modern-day New York.

Smith then left Ion Storm to work at Midway Games, originally to work on a title called Criminal with "immersive sim values" inspired by Michael Mann's 1995 crime film Heat, but shifting ultimately to work as lead designer on BlackSite: Area 51. On November 29, 2007, Smith came out publicly to announce how unrealistic the BlackSite: Area 51's development schedule was and through mutual agreement left Midway a day later. He claimed the schedule caused the low reviews due to the fact they were not able to test the game properly.

In 2008, Smith became partner and co-creative director of Arkane Studios in Austin alongside the company's president, Raphaël Colantonio. They went on to release the stealth-action game Dishonored in 2012, which won many Game of the Year and Best Action/Adventure accolades including the 2013 BAFTA award for Best Game and 2012 SPIKE VGA for Best Action/Adventure Game. Smith also directed the sequel Dishonored 2 and its standalone expansion Dishonored: Death of the Outsider. Smith served as co-director on Arkane Austin's Redfall, an open-world first person shooter, which released on May 2, 2023. He continued to work at Arkane Austin until its closure in May 2024.

Smith's semi-autobiographical novel, Big Jack is Dead, was released on April 2, 2013, by CreateSpace Independent Publishing Platform. That same year it was on Kirkus Review's list of "Best Indie General Fiction".

Smith, along with other former Arkane developers, formed a new studio, Black Pony Immersive, in August 2026, with its aim to continue development of immersive sims.

== Works ==
=== Video games ===
| Year | Title | Role |
|---|---|---|
| 1994 | Super Wing Commander | Quality assurance |
| 1994 | System Shock | Quality assurance |
| 1995 | Ultima VIII: Pagan (CD-ROM version) | Quality assurance |
| 1995 | BioForge | Quality assurance |
| 1995 | CyberMage: Darklight Awakening | Producer, game designer, writer, voice actor |
| 1995 | Technosaur (cancelled) | —N/a |
| 1998 | FireTeam | Game designer |
| 2000 | Deus Ex | Lead game designer |
| 2003 | Deus Ex: Invisible War | Director |
| 2004 | Thief: Deadly Shadows | Game designer |
| 2005 | Area 51 | Game designer, writer |
| 2007 | BlackSite: Area 51 | Executive creative director |
| 2009 | Spider: The Secret of Bryce Manor | Quality assurance |
| 2009 | KarmaStar | —N/a |
| 2012 | Dishonored | Creative director, game designer, writer |
| 2013 | The Novelist | Quality assurance |
| 2016 | Dishonored 2 | Creative director |
| 2017 | Prey | Quality assurance |
| 2017 | Dishonored: Death of the Outsider | Creative director |
| 2023 | Redfall | Studio director |

=== Book ===
| Year | Title | Category | Publisher | ISBN |
|---|---|---|---|---|
| 2013 | "Big Jack is Dead" | Fiction | CreateSpace Independent Publishing Platform | ISBN 1482563657 |
