= KarmaStar =

2009 video game

- Developer: Arkane Studios
- Publisher: Majesco
- Platforms: iPhone iPod Touch
- Release: March 25, 2009

KarmaStar is a 2009 mobile video game from Arkane Studios.

== Gameplay ==
KarmaStar is a strategy game that represents an entire life in just eight turns, as players control a spaceman who must acquire resources — love, money, family, intelligence, and health — while competing against rivals to gain the most points before the lifecycle ends. Players can gain resources or challenge others in turn-based resource battles which rely on virtual dice rolls, where a higher roll wins. Special abilities like moxie (extra battle rolls), alchemy, and corruption can help or hinder progress. Players can attack rivals or share resources strategically. Players can compete against human opponents for a more engaging experience.

== Development ==
The game was first teased in September 2008 during Harvey Smith's (the game's developer) 2008 Austin GDC GameCareerGuide session. The title was officially announced in March 2009 with Majesco being the game's publisher. It was released on March 25, 2009.

== Reception ==
Reception

Review scores
Publication	Score
Pocket Gamer	3/5/5
IGN	8/10

IGN gave the game a score of 8 out of 10, stating:"KarmaStar is a fun, fresh strategy game that reminded me of a card game without cards. There is a great deal of depth here within the three difficulty levels of your AI-controlled opponents"

Macworld praised the game's strategic depth and great visual style.

Daily Record said "KarmaStar has recently been reduced to 59p on the App Store and is well worth it"
