= F-22 Interceptor =

1991 combat flight simulator

- North American box art
- Developer: Lerner Research
- Publishers: WW: Electronic Arts; JP: Electronic Arts Victor
- Producer: Paul Grace
- Designer: Ned Lerner
- Programmers: Gene Kusmiak; Scott Cronce
- Artist: Alan J. Murphy
- Composer: Michael Bartlow
- Platform: Sega Genesis
- Release: NA: November 1991; EU: December 1991; JP: February 12, 1993
- Genre: Air combat simulation
- Modes: Single-player, multiplayer

F-22 Interceptor is a 1991 combat flight simulator created by Ned Lerner and Gene Kusmiak. It was released by Electronic Arts for the Sega Genesis.

The player controls one aircraft, the F-22 Raptor, throughout the game. At that time, the prototype of the F-22, the Lockheed YF-22, had only first flown in 1990. Like LHX Attack Chopper, another flight simulator by EA, the playable aircraft had not yet been developed.

== Gameplay ==
Destroying enemy aircraft results in a great explosion and no survivors.

The player has three skill levels to choose from: Cadet, Training, and Combat. The player must then pick one of four campaigns, called 'US', 'Korea' (North Korea), 'Iraq', and 'Russia' (Soviet Union). In each level, the player's F-22 is targeted by surface-to-air missiles, enemy aircraft, and artillery. The mission is to destroy the targets and complete the objectives using a wide range of missiles, from heat seeking missiles, precision-guided bombs, and chaff. The aircraft is also given two cannons for engaging enemy targets.

At the end of each mission, the player is required to either land on a runway or an aircraft carrier. Sometimes in-flight refueling is needed to prevent the F-22 from crashing.

As the game progresses, the player will be able to unlock an Aces campaign, where they will face off with advanced pilots from North Korea, Iraq, the Soviet Union, and the United States, the four countries the player visits while playing through the first four campaigns.

The game also had a rudimentary mission editor.

Although there is not conventional multiplayer, two players can fly as pilot and copilot; a second controller allows a second player to target while the first player flies.

== Reception ==
Reception

Review scores
Publication	Score
Electronic Gaming Monthly	7/10, 8/10, 7/10, 5/10
MegaTech	90%

Award
Publication	Award
MegaTech (1991)	Hyper Game Award

MegaTech magazine said the game was "absolutely fantastic. The graphics, presentation and playability are all spot on". Mega placed the game at #30 in their Top Mega Drive Games of All Time.
