= Chuck Yeager's Advanced Flight Trainer =

1987 video game

- Developer: Lerner Research
- Publisher: Electronic Arts
- Designer: Ned Lerner
- Platforms: Amstrad CPC, Apple II, Commodore 64, MS-DOS, Mac, MSX, ZX Spectrum
- Release: 1987
- Genre: Flight simulator
- Mode: Single-player

Chuck Yeager's Advanced Flight Trainer is a flight simulation video game published by Electronic Arts in 1987. It was originally released as Chuck Yeager's Advanced Flight Simulator. Due to a legal dispute with Microsoft over the term "Flight Simulator", the game was pulled from shelves and renamed. Many copies of the original version were sold prior to this. Chuck Yeager served as technical consultant for the game, where his likeness and voice were prominently used.

The game allows a player to "test pilot" 14 different airplanes, including the Bell X-1, which Yeager had piloted to become the first man to exceed Mach 1.

The game is embellished by Yeager's laconic commentary: When the user crashes one plane, Yeager remarks "You sure bought the farm on that one", or other asides.

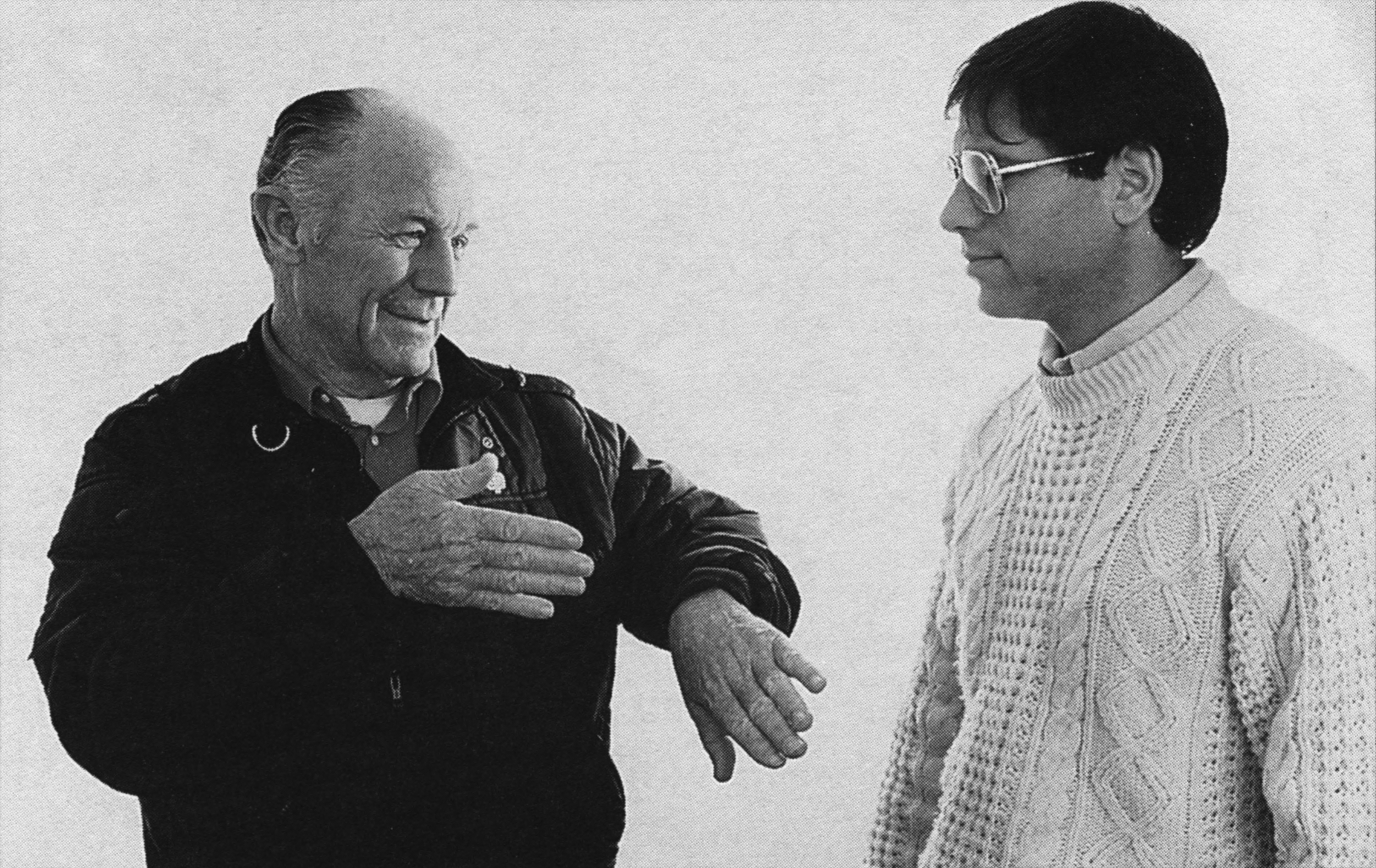
Yeager discussing the game's development with designer Ned Lerner.

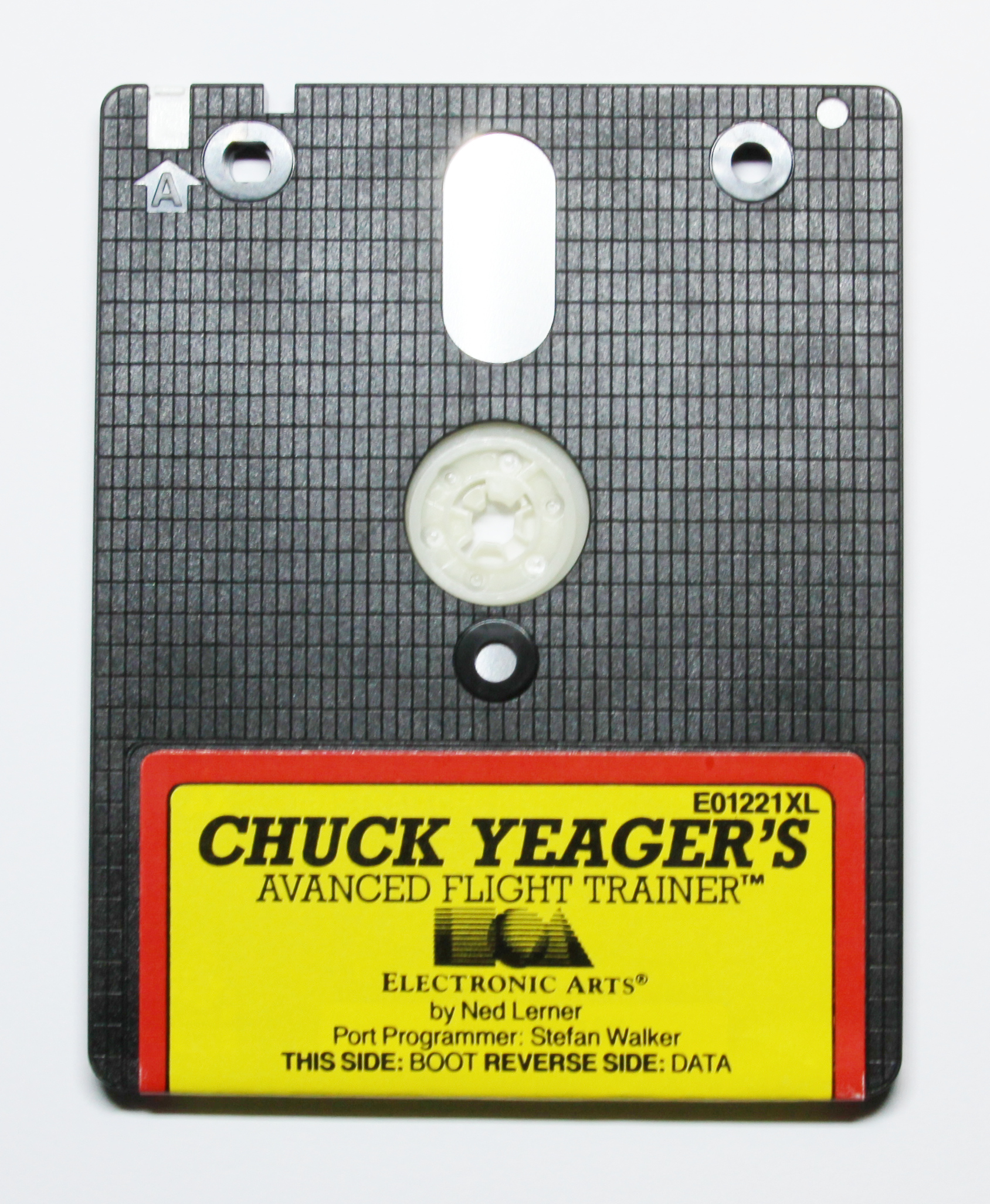
Amstrad CPC version on 3" floppy disk

== Aircraft ==
Chuck Yeager's Advanced Flight Trainer includes 12 real aircraft and three experimental aircraft designed by the developers. The fictional experimental aircraft were named after people who worked on the game.

Real aircraft

- Bell X-1
- Cessna 172
- Douglas X-3 Stiletto
- General Dynamics F-16 Fighting Falcon
- Lockheed SR-71 Blackbird
- McDonnell Douglas F/A-18 Hornet
- North American P-51 Mustang
- Piper PA-28 Cherokee
- Sopwith Camel
- SPAD S.XIII
- Supermarine Spitfire
- Vought F4U Corsair

Experimental aircraft

- Grace Industries XPG-12 Samurai
- Hilleman Ltd. XRH4 MadDog
- Lerner Aeronautics XNL-16 Instigator

== Reception ==
Reception

Award
Publication	Award
Amstrad Action	Mastergame

The game was a big hit for EA, selling 100,000 copies by December 1987. In May 1988, it was awarded a "Platinum" certification from the Software Publishers Association for sales above 250,000 units. David Wilson, writing for Computer Gaming World, noted that Yeager has been a top gun performer for the San Mateo–based software company, also noting that the game went SPA "Gold" quickest of any Electronic Arts title (in a little over three months of sales).

Game reviewers Hartley and Patricia Lesser complimented the game in their "The Role of Computers" column in Dragon #126 (1987), giving PC/MS-DOS version of the game 4 out of 5 stars. The Lessers also reviewed the Macintosh version of the game in 1988 in Dragon #140 in "The Role of Computers" column, giving that version 4 stars as well.

Writing for Compute!, Ervin Bobo criticized the blocky graphics and sound, but noted that the simple graphics resulted in a high frame rate. It concluded that Chuck Yeager differed from other games in simulating flying high-performance experimental aircraft.

In Issue 8 of Gateways, Charles and Sydney Barouch liked that Chuck Yeager appeared on screen to make fun of the player after a crash.

In Issue 11 of MacUser, Jay Palmer rated the Macintosh version 2 mice out of 5, stating that it "is nowhere as good as either Microsoft's Flight Simulator or Spectrum Holobyte's Falcon". Citing aircraft too similar to each other and both too hard to fly and too easy to land, "rough and unrealistic" controls, "simplistic by today's standards" graphics, and missing features from other versions, Palmer concluded "Sorry Chuck, but you bought the farm on this one".

In a 1994 survey of wargames Computer Gaming World gave the 7-year-old game 1+ stars out of 5.

== Legacy ==
This game was followed in 1989 by Chuck Yeager's Advanced Flight Trainer 2.0 and in 1991 by Chuck Yeager's Air Combat.
