= LMNO =

Cancelled video game

- A screencap from LMNO's visual target animation, showing Eve at a truck shop reacting as government officials arrive outside from the player-character's point-of-view
- Developers: EA Los Angeles; Arkane Studios
- Publisher: Electronic Arts
- Engine: Unreal Engine 3
- Platform: Windows
- Release: Cancelled
- Genre: Action role-playing game

LMNO was the working title for a video game in development by EA Los Angeles, notable for Steven Spielberg's involvement in the project.

The partnership with Spielberg, first announced in 2005, was to produce an action game with an aim to evoke emotion, described as "a mix of first-person parkour movement with adventure and role-playing elements and escape-focused gameplay, all involving the player's relationship with an alien-looking character named Eve". According to Sébastien Mitton, the art director at Arkane Studios, the story had the player-character rescue Eve from a government laboratory on the east coast of the United States and help her escape on a road trip to the west coast trying to keep her alien nature hidden from encounters with other humans, which he described as a very typical Spielberg story. As a requirement of Spielberg, the game would have lacked gunplay, instead allowing the player to avoid combat by solving puzzles or if necessary resorting to hand-to-hand fighting. The game also had focused on characterization and expressions with player decisions having impacts on how the game progressed.

EA Los Angeles, which Spielberg had collaborated with before, brought established talent from other studios to help on the project, including Doug Church, Randy Smith, Habib Zargarpour, and Jason Rohrer. They also brought in Arkane Studios to help with at least one level, that of a western truck stop. The project was officially announced as cancelled in late 2010, although sources place the actual date that work ceased on the project as being around a year earlier.

Details about LMNO, including preliminary gameplay footage, were revealed as part of a larger documentary on Arkane Studios released by Noclip in May 2020.

== See also ==
- Film and television adaptations of video games
