= Ned Lerner =

American video game programmer

Edward Lerner
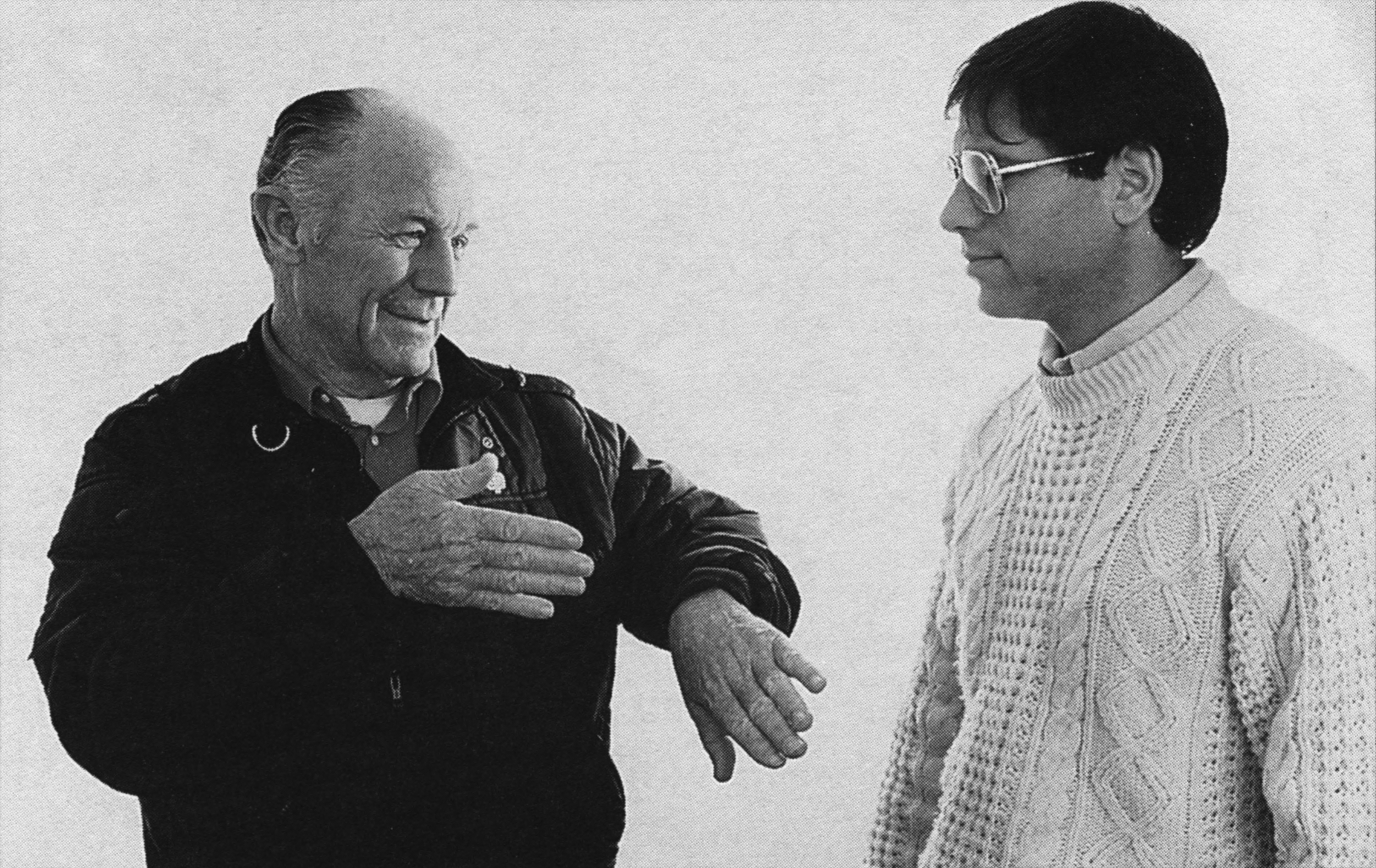
- Lerner with Chuck Yeager during the development of Chuck Yeager's Advanced Flight Trainer
- Other name: Ned Lerner
- Occupation: Video game programmer
- Known for: Simulation video games

Edward Lerner, or Ned Lerner, is an American video game designer.

== Career ==
In 1983 he founded Lerner Research (a 3D simulation development company) which was responsible for Chuck Yeager's Advanced Flight Trainer, Deep Space, Ultima Underworld, F-22 Interceptor, and also created the first 3D system licensed by Electronic Arts.

He later co-founded Blue Sky Productions (later Looking Glass Studios), filling the roles of Chairman of the Board, Chief Operating Officer, and VP Product Development. During this time, he led the development of more 3D simulation and entertainment software, such as Flight Unlimited, System Shock, Links Pro, John Madden Football '93, and Ultima Underworld II: Labyrinth of Worlds.

In 1997, he co-founded Multitude, an Internet gaming multiplayer startup that created FireTeam, the first real-time internet team game with full voice conferencing. The full voice functionality was spun off into a standalone product called FireTalk.

Ned later 2002 for 8 months went on to work at Venture FireFighters, and Electronic Arts (as Chief Technology Officer).

Ned previously in 2003-2017 worked for Sony Computer Entertainment America, Director of Tools & Technology. In this role he was involved in the development of games for the PlayStation 3, PlayStation 4, and PlayStation Portable.
