= Deathloop =

2021 video game

- Cover art featuring the two main characters: Colt (bottom) and Julianna (top)
- Developer: Arkane Lyon
- Publisher: Bethesda Softworks
- Directors: Dinga Bakaba; Sébastien Mitton
- Producer: Yoann Guilloud
- Designer: Gauthier Roussel
- Programmer: Hugues Tardif
- Artist: Sébastien Mitton
- Writers: Paweł Kroenke; Sandra Duval
- Composer: Tom Salta
- Series: Dishonored
- Engine: Void Engine
- Platforms: PlayStation 5; Windows; Xbox Series X/S
- Release: PlayStation 5, Windows; 14 September 2021; Xbox Series X/S; 20 September 2022
- Genre: First-person shooter
- Modes: Single-player, multiplayer

Deathloop is a 2021 first-person shooter game developed by Arkane Lyon and published by Bethesda Softworks. The player controls Colt Vahn, an assassin who must escape a time loop by killing eight targets known as visionaries before midnight each day. The story is set on an island named Blackreef. Each day is divided into morning, noon, afternoon, and evening; and moving between the island's four districts causes time to advance. Using Colt's arsenal of gear and powers, the player must identify the optimal way to kill all targets in one day. As with Arkane's previous games, Deathloop is an immersive sim, with the game providing players a variety of ways to approach their objectives.

Development of Deathloop began in 2018, originally as a smaller-scale project that allowed Arkane to experiment with new gameplay mechanics. The game was built on Arkane's previous works, such as Dishonored, introducing nonlinear gameplay and removing the morality system, enabling players to take risks without considering narrative repercussions, as well as Prey: Mooncrash, which experimented with the roguelike formula and remix gameplay using a limited amount of assets. Arkane implemented asymmetrical multiplayer, an unused gameplay mechanic from its unreleased game The Crossing that enables a second player to control Julianna and hunt Colt. Films and television series like Groundhog Day and The Avengers inspired the story and aesthetics, while the Scottish Highlands and the Faroe Islands inspired the design of Blackreef.

Deathloop was released on 14 September 2021 for Windows PC and PlayStation 5, and for Xbox Series X and Series S on 20 September 2022. Although the story takes place in the Dishonored universe, Bethesda did not market it as a spin-off of that franchise because it has a distinct story and characters. Deathloop received generally positive reviews; critics praised its gameplay, structure, art direction, characters and story, but criticized its artificial intelligence. Many critics described Deathloop as original and regarded it as one of Arkane Studio's best games. It attracted more than five million players upon launch, and it was nominated for several end-of-year accolades, including Game of the Year at the Game Awards, D.I.C.E. Awards, and British Academy Games Awards.

== Gameplay ==
Colt's inner thoughts sometimes appear as text.

Deathloop is set on an island called Blackreef. The player controls Colt, an assassin who is stuck in a time loop. Colt must eliminate eight targets called Visionaries across Blackreef before midnight; if one Visionary remains alive, the time loop will reset and undo Colt's work. Deathloop has a multiplayer mode in which the player can alternatively play as Julianna, a Visionary tasked with protecting the time loop and killing Colt. When the player takes this role, they enter a random player's game and may interfere with their play. Juliana has a unique ability named Masquerade that allows her to swap her appearance with any non-playable character (NPC), enabling her to blend in with crowds and stay concealed. If the player disables multiplayer, Julianna will be controlled by artificial intelligence.

The game has two types of missions: Visionaries Leads is the campaign's critical path and Arsenal Leads guide players to improved weapons and gear. Each day is divided into morning, noon, afternoon, and evening, and moving between the island's four districts causes time to advance. The routines of the people in a particular district vary depending on the time of day the player enters, and the player's actions in one district can affect routines in the others. Different times of day open alternative paths for players to explore. For instance, a room that is locked in the morning may be unlocked at night. Players must learn the patterns of Colt's targets and figure out the correct order in which to kill the targets. Because it was impossible for Colt to separately kill all Visionaries, he must manipulate events to assemble multiple Visionaries in one location so he can kill them in quick succession. There is only one correct order to kill all Visionaries in a single loop. The time loop in Deathloop is not timed; players can freely explore each location to find clues and complete side objectives. A clue found by Colt may inform the player of their tasks in the next location, and intelligence collected in one loop can be used to player's advantages in the next loop. Players may need to spend multiple loops and revisit locations several times before they can identify the steps that are needed to assassinate all of their targets.

=== Combat ===
Deathloop is an immersive sim video game that is played from a first-person perspective. Players are presented with a large arsenal of tools, allowing them to choose how they want to approach their objectives. Each location in Deathloop is also a sandbox that provides alternative paths for players to reach their targets. Colt has access to firearms, melee weapons, and grenades that can be used to defeat enemies. Weapons are divided into several categories of rarity. More-common gear may frequently jam while rarer weapons are more powerful but more difficult to locate. Gunshots draw opponents in the vicinity to hunt down the player. Alternatively, players can use stealth tactics to silently evade their opponents, distract them by throwing bottles, or kill them with traps or suppressed firearms without being detected. By remaining concealed, players can eavesdrop on conversations between other characters, thus opening new gameplay opportunities. Players can use their hacking tool to disable security cameras, gun turrets and security doors to their advantage. They gain trinkets, which are divided into several tiers of rarity. Weapon trinkets improve a weapon's performance and handling, while character trinkets provide additional abilities such as allowing Colt to double jump, heal more quickly, or take less damage. Each weapon can be equipped with three weapon trinkets, while Colt can equip four trinkets.

Some Visionaries drop Slabs, mysterious tablets that grant the user special powers, when they are killed. Players can wield two of five Slabs at once. "Shift" allows Colt to teleport short distances; "Aether" briefly turns him invisible; "Nexus" links together enemies together so damage dealt to one enemy will be inflicted to all who are linked; "Havoc" significantly increases Colt's damage output while boosting his defense; and "Karnesis" enables Colt to lift and slam enemies on the ground. The "Goldenloop" update introduces a new ability named "Fugue", which allows Colt to slow and disorient targeted enemies. Slabs can be further upgraded for up-to four times by killing the Visionary who drops it in subsequent loops. Colt has an ability named "Reprise" that allows him to be revived twice in each location. If the player is killed three times in the same location, the loop will restart and Colt loses all of his weapons, trinkets, and slabs. To prevent this, Colt can infuse his gear with a resource named "Residuum" so they become permanent in his arsenal. Residuum can be collected by killing Visionaries and through caches that are found in each location. Collected Residuum cannot be carried over to the next loop. All gathered Residuum is dropped upon Colt's death, though players can recover them if they reach the location of Colt's most-recent death.

== Synopsis ==
=== Setting ===
Deathloop is set on the subarctic isle of Blackreef that is trapped in a continuous time loop that makes the island and its inhabitants repeat a single day. Originally home to a quiet fishing village, a military base was eventually established to research the mysterious temporal anomalies that began appearing on Blackreef. Decades later, reclusive scientist Egor Serling intended to harness these unusual properties as a means of gaining immortality. He recruited eight other eccentric individuals, collectively known as the "Visionaries", to found the AEON Program, with the goal of using the infinite time loop to pursue their own unusual interests, with scores of fanatical followers known as "Eternalists" under their influence. Because the loop continuously resets at midnight and restores everything to its prior state (even reversing death), most of the island's inhabitants have given Blackreef a debaucherous, and often violent, party-like atmosphere, as there are no permanent consequences for any action as long as the loop continues.

While most inhabitants retain no memory of the prior loops' events, two individuals have proven to be an exception: Colt Vahn, who seeks to use his acquired knowledge (and mistakes) across multiple repeated days to break the loop and escape the island, while Julianna Blake aims to prevent him from doing so, even if that means killing Colt. Every morning, Julianna warns the entire island about Colt's betrayal, turning everyone hostile towards him. In order to break the loop, Colt must gradually learn how to kill all of the Visionaries in a single day, as they each harness the interdimensional energy that causes the loop. This energy has also granted them superhuman abilities, harnessed through mysterious artifacts known as "Slabs", which Colt is able to acquire and upgrade with each Visionary's death.

While exploring the various regions of Blackreef at different times of day, Colt is also able to learn about the island's long and enigmatic history, evidenced by the different architectural and design motifs. The island's humble origins are displayed through weathered Victorian-esque structures, contrasted by the stark minimalism of the later military installations, and ultimately the late 1960s-inspired Mid-century Modern aesthetics imposed on the island by the followers of the AEON Program. The game director, Dinga Bakaba, also confirmed in interviews that Deathloop exists in the same universe as the Dishonored series, with Deathloop taking place at least a century after the events of Dishonored.

=== Plot ===
Colt Vahn wakes up from a dream in which an unknown woman murders him, hungover on a beach with no memories of his identity or location. He receives guidance from alternate versions of himself, instructing him to break the time loop in which he is trapped. To do this, he must kill all eight Visionaries before the time loop resets itself at the end of the day. Julianna Blake warns the Visionaries and their followers, the Eternalists, of Colt's plan, prompting them to hunt him down. He finds that, unlike the other inhabitants of the island, he and Julianna can retain their memories (and later, small objects) across loops.

While Colt devises a plan to kill seven of the Visionaries, Julianna remains elusive, choosing to hide in the antenna of the Stabilizer Core, the structure that harnesses Blackreef's time loop. The only way to reach the Core is to use an abandoned military rocket airplane powered by "Residuum", the mysterious interdimensional substance that creates the timeloop. Colt investigates old bunkers across the island and learns he was a member of Operation Horizon, the original military expedition to Blackreef decades earlier, but was accidentally sent into a 17-year timeloop by an experiment that went awry. Colt was later recruited by the AEON Program due to his knowledge of the island, ultimately becoming the program's head of security. He also learns that during his time with Project Horizon, he had fallen in love with a fellow operative named Lila, with Julianna being their child. After successfully killing all the other visionaries in a single day, Colt activates the rocket and reaches the Core, where he confronts Julianna. She says things started to go wrong when Colt, having had second thoughts about the AEON Program, started killing her in every loop to free her from it. She grew to hate him and began to retaliate, culminating in her hunting him in every loop. She presents Colt with a choice: kill her, break the loop and suffer an uncertain future, or spare her so they can continue living eternally through the loops.

- If Colt chooses to kill Julianna and himself to break the loop, he wakes up on the beach — now a strange apocalyptic landscape — with Julianna holding him at gunpoint. She decides to spare him and departs, leaving him to face the uncertain future alone. The Goldenloop update expands on this ending, showing all of the Visionaries and Eternalists also waking to find the loop broken. Colt then leads a group of Eternalists to explore the wastelands beyond Blackreef.
- If Colt chooses to kill Julianna but refuses to kill himself, the loop resets as normal.
- If Colt chooses to spare Julianna, they reconcile and cooperate to hunt the other inhabitants of Blackreef for fun.

== Development ==
Deathloop was developed by Arkane Lyon, the studio behind Dishonored (2012) and its sequel Dishonored 2 (2016). Development began in 2018, initially as a smaller project for Arkane. According to studio co-founder Raphaël Colantonio, the studio's goal was to experiment with multiplayer and identify ways to recycle gameplay. Arkane previously experimented with the roguelike genre with Prey: Mooncrash (2018), and Deathloop was built to further expand on the idea of remixing gameplay using a limited amount of assets. Deathloop's scope significantly expanded during development and it was launched as a fully-priced product in September 2021. Before Colantonio departed the studio, he appointed Dinga Bakaba and Sebastien Mitton as the directors for Deathloop.

=== Gameplay ===
Deathloop placed a large emphasis on player's choices and freedom. According to Bakaba, it "[entrusted] the player with a lot of ownership of their own enjoyment". As an immersive sim, Deathloop established consistent gameplay rules, and players were encouraged to plan their approach based on their understanding of these rules and to see if the game responded accordingly. According to level designer Dana Nightingale, Deathloop was designed for "deliberate" play and discouraged random player actions. Arkane's map designers avoided adding chokepoints that funnel the player in a particular direction, as the game was designed to be less linear when compared with Dishonored. They attempted to build open spaces where players can choose not to engage with scripted confrontations or interactions with other characters. Colt's powers were designed to be similar to those in Dishonored to maintain a level of familiarity to fans of Arkane's past works. Bakaba described Deathloop's gameplay as "Dishonored with guns"; the team removed all non-lethal means of dispatching enemies that are common in Dishonored games.

Deathloop's time-loop structure was designed to encourage players to visit locations multiple times. Familiarity with each location enabled players to master their gameplay skills and understand the myriad of systems earlier. As levels were designed to be replayed, the level-design team worked to ensure each route toward an objective had their own advantages and drawbacks. The roguelike inspiration also prompted players to experiment with different gadgets and builds. Unlike Dishonored, which had a morality system to judge the player's actions, Deathloop maintained a neutral stance throughout to avoid facilitating a specific playstyle. The developers removed quick-save functionality from the Dishonored series because they wanted players to see the consequences of their actions and react to them, being spontaneous rather than loading a saved game to bypass failures.

Bakaba described Deathloop as a "murder puzzle" and an "inverted Cluedo" in which players must achieve the "Golden Loop" by eliminating all Visionaries within a single day. Bakaba added while players may fear the time loop at the beginning for disrupting their progress, they will eventually understand time is on Colt's side and he can become its master in a manner similar to the protagonists of Groundhog Day (1993) and Palm Springs (2020). The developers did not want to punish players for slowly exploring each location. As a result, time passed only when players exited a level; Bakaba compared this system to a turn-based game. Initially, Deathloop provided little-to-no guidance on how to achieve the "Golden Loop" so players can solve the mystery on their own. Early playtesters did not understand the game enough to progress so Arkane introduced a tutorial session, dubbed internally as the "guided tour", to help players understand the gameplay mechanics. Quests also offered players straightforward guidance. Unlike immersive sims with a minimalistic head-up display (HUD), Deathloop's user interface readily provided players with information. Due to the focus on puzzles, the developers did not want players to become cognitively overwhelmed.

To introduce a layer of unpredictability, Arkane added a multiplayer mode, having explored the concept of asymmetrical multiplayer in its unreleased title The Crossing. The developers wanted fighting Julianna to be a challenge and ensured Colt had a slight advantage over her through the "Reprise" ability, which allowed him to respawn twice. This gameplay dynamic encouraged those playing as Colt to take more risks and the player controlling Julianna to be more cautious. Familiarity with the map helped the player controlling Julianna to notice Colt's location and identify the best way to kill him; Arkane described this as the "ultimate test" for veteran players. Bakaba described the multiplayer mode as an "anecdote generator". It was designed to be "freeform"; encounters did not need to end with a direct confrontation. In-game voice chat was disabled because Arkane considered Deathloop to be a single-player game in which players should feel like they are being hunted by "a character from the game, not someone from the internet". Arkane replaced the parry system in Dishonored with a simpler kick mechanic because the timing for parrying human-controlled characters and other NPCs would be different due to network latency.

=== Story and characters ===
According to Bakaba, events in Deathloop were originally planned to have occurred across four days. Every character knows they are living in a time loop but only Julianna, Colt, and several minor characters retain memories of the events in each loop. This results in the Visionaries and the Eternalists acting lightheartedly because nothing they do has consequences when each day resets anew. Despite the initial hostile tension, Julianna and Colt gradually grow close to each other because they were the only characters with persistent memories. The developers had to make Colt amnesiac so he will learn alongside the player. According to Bakaba, Julianna wants to stop Colt from breaking the loop but did not want him to stop trying. The interactions between Colt and Julianna are based around the films of Quentin Tarantino. Julianna's prominence as a character was introduced fairly late in the development; her role was initially comparable to the other Visionaries. The Visionaries were given strong, thoroughly developed personalities and backstories; however, they were designed so the player doesn't feel remorse at killing them. They do not have character arcs because the game is set in a time loop. The development team used several narrative tools to aid storytelling because the game does not have extensive cutscenes. Floating thoughts are Colt's thoughts from previous loop interactions, and were designed as a cheap way to provide gameplay hints and add to the mood. While the developers initially avoided having Colt talk to himself, playtesters felt this helped players to better follow the story, and the studio further developed Colt as a talkative person.

Deathloop's narrative was inspired by a number of films. Besides time-travel and time-loop films like Groundhog Day, Edge of Tomorrow (2014) and the Back to the Future trilogy, the game was also influenced by the French comedy La Colle (2017) and The Fourth Dimension (2012). Films like The Running Man (1987), The Warriors (1979), The Wicker Man (1973), Under the Volcano (1984), and Dark City (1998) inspired the plot of a solitary man working to solve a mystery in an isolated location while being hunted. Colt's appearance heavily draws from Denzel Washington's character in The Book of Eli (2010), while his motives are based around the character Snake Plissken from Escape from New York (1981), and some gadgets were inspired by the James Bond series. Deathloop is set in the Dishonored universe, though Arkane and Bethesda avoided positioning Deathloop as a Dishonored spin-off because it has a standalone story and characters.

=== Art and music ===
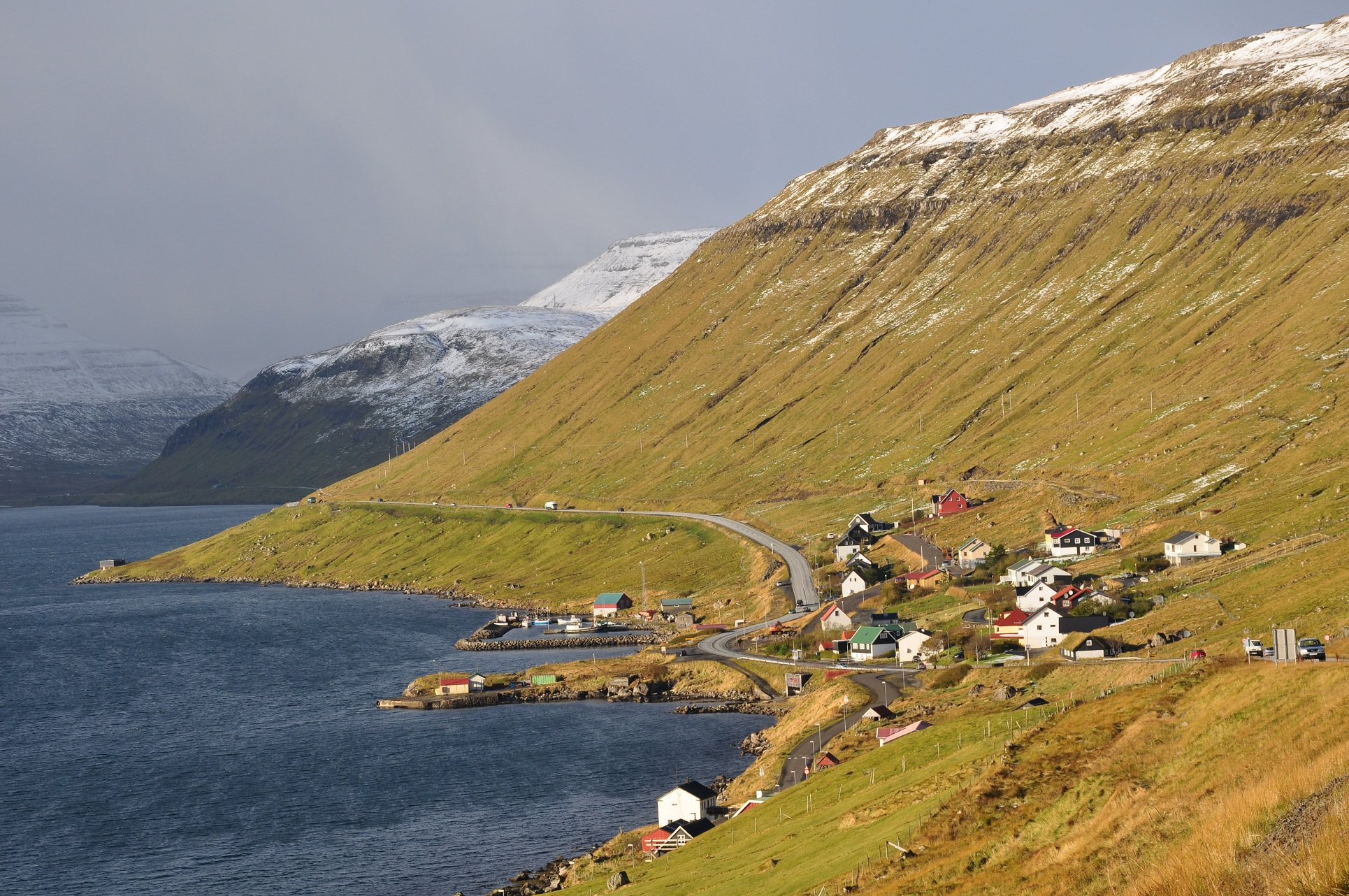
The Faroe Islands (pictured) inspired the landscape of Blackreef.

The development team wanted Blackreef to be an isolated but "relatively built-up" location. Its design was inspired by the Scottish Highlands as seen in Skyfall (2012), the Faroe Islands, the Falkland Islands, and remote petroleum-extraction stations in Northern Russia. Settlements were inspired by Italian towns like Positano, which invited joyous exploration. Mitton used Google Earth and Google Street View to research locations. To create a surrealistic atmosphere and depict a world frozen in time, the team contrasted the 1960s aesthetics with military structures that were common in the 1930s and 1940s. Of the four locations, Updaam, was the first Arkane created; Bakaba described it as a "traditional urban area". "The Complex" focuses on the contrast between nature and technology, and is the most scientific area. Fristad Rock focuses on the contrast between an old, derelict bunker and an elegant, lavish casino; and Karl's Bay serves as the major party and entertainment location.

The aesthetics were inspired by imagery of the 1960s because it evokes both a sense of mystery and nostalgia, and because its light-hearted vibe fits with the narrative of "an eternal party". The British espionage television series The Avengers (1961-69), significantly influenced Deathloop's overall direction. The visual direction was also inspired by the styles of the Swinging Sixties and the contemporary depiction of the era as seen through Guy Ritchie's The Man from U.N.C.L.E. (2015). While creating the costumes of the characters, the team was influenced by the works of stylist Vidal Sassoon. Because Deathloop requires players to be familiar with the four locations, the developers strove to ensure it was not too visually complicated. To ensure the game was visually distinct, Arkane took cues from the use of color in films like High Plains Drifter (1973) and Point Blank (1967), using bright colors and designs to give the island an endless party atmosphere. Billboards that reveal secrets about the island were drawn from the film They Live (1988), and the works of graphic artists Saul Bass and Robert McGinnis inspired the cutscenes and posters. The modernist architecture was inspired by the works of Frank Lloyd Wright, while the interiors were inspired by photographs from the book Lair: Radical Homes and Hideouts of Movie Villains (2019).

Michel Trémouiller was the audio director and Tom Salta composed its music. The soundtrack is primarily Jazz fusion music. The developers were inspired by 1950s and 1960s science-fiction and horror films and television shows, such as Not of This Earth (1957) and My Favorite Martian (1999), as well as A Clockwork Orange (1971) and The Thing (1951). Soundtracks from spy movies also influenced the developers, especially when they were composing the score for the Visionaries, each of whom has a distinct musical theme. Salta also worked to ensure his score reinforces the time-loop theme; some chord progressions repeat in a variety of ways depending on the player's actions and location. Salta used musical instruments from the 1960s, such as a Rhodes piano, a Hammond B3 organ, a vibraphone, a clavinet, and a mellotron for the music. Synthwave music was also included; Salta used a theremin and a EMS Synthi AKS synthesizer to produce the music. Diegetic music, which is broadcast in-game through radios and loudspeakers, was written by Ross Tregenza and Erich Talaba. Sencit Music and the artist FJØRA released a theme song for Deathloop titled "Deja Vu" to accompany the release of one of the trailers.

== Release ==
Publisher Bethesda Softworks filed a trademark application for Deathloop in December 2018. Arkane and Bethesda revealed it at E3 2019. It was also shown during Sony's PlayStation 5 event in June 2020, confirming it would be released as a timed console exclusive on the PlayStation 5 in late 2020 alongside a release for Windows. In August 2020, it was announced the release was delayed until Q2 2021 because development was affected by the US government's response to the COVID-19 pandemic. The company later announced it planned to release Deathloop on 21 May 2021. In April 2021, Arkane postponed the release until 14 September that year. The development was completed on 5 August 2021; Arkane confirmed it had been declared gold, indicating it was being prepared for duplication and release. Players who purchased the Deluxe Edition gained access to new weapons, trinkets, and character skins.

On 21 September 2020, Microsoft and Bethesda Softworks' parent company ZeniMax Media announced Microsoft's intent to buy ZeniMax and its studios, including Arkane, for US$7.5 billion, incorporating the studios as part of Xbox Game Studios; the sale was finalized on 9 March 2021. Xbox Game Studios head Phil Spencer said this deal would not affect Deathloop's platform-exclusive release on the PlayStation 5, and that it would remain exclusive there for one year before its release for other consoles. Deathloop was released for Xbox Series X/S on 20 September 2022, alongside a "Goldenloop" update that introduces a new weapon, a new ability, new enemy types, cross-platform play and an extended ending. Dark Horse Comics released an artbook for Deathloop in August 2022.

== Reception ==
=== Critical reception ===
Reception

Aggregate scores
Aggregator	Score
Metacritic	PC: 87/100; PS5: 88/100; XSX: 89/100
OpenCritic	92% recommend

Review scores
Publication	Score
Eurogamer	Essential
Game Informer	9/10
GameSpot	10/10
GamesRadar+	4.5/5
IGN	10/10
PC Gamer (US)	89/100
PCGamesN	10/10
Push Square	8/10
The Guardian	5/5
VG247	5/5

Deathloop received "generally favorable reviews" from critics, according to review aggregator website Metacritic. 92% of critics recommended it, according to OpenCritic.

Edwin Evans-Thirwell from Eurogamer described Deathloop as one of the most enjoyable games Arkane had released; he noted its connection to the Dishonored series, and called Deathloop a significant refinement over its predecessor while also being an "accessible introduction to Arkane's grittier immersive sims". Writing for GameSpot, Tamoor Hussain said "observation and dynamic thinking" are as important as combat in Deathloop, and players are rewarded for carefully planning and understanding the system and rules. He also enjoyed a sense of progression because the ease of navigation and combat significantly increase as players gain more powers and become increasingly familiar with each location. Several critics said Deathloop is a very original game; Matt Purslow from IGN praised the developers for turning disparate-yet-interesting ideas into a cohesive package that is "fascinating unique", and integrating elements from games such as Dishonored, Hitman, Outer Wilds and Dark Souls. Many critics noted the player's large arsenal of tools and powers were no longer shackled by Dishonored's morality system, meaning players can embrace action as a viable mean of progression, encouraging them to experiment with the systems, improvise and take risks.

The investigative gameplay also received a mixed reception. West noted the acquisition of knowledge in Deathloop is more important than any gun and power, and that the game has a novel structure in which its open-ended nature became more linear as players approach the end. He described it as a "fascinating twist" that keeps the experience dense and focused. Purslow also said the non-linear investigative gameplay is satisfying, and remarked players will constantly make "thrilling discoveries" as they recognize the causal relationship between their actions and in-game results. Several critics found Deathloop too linear and guides players through the process of executing the Golden Loop. William Hughes, writing for The A.V. Club, was disappointed that it has "such a low opinion of the player's ability to do that mystery-solving on [their] own". Critics praised the multiplayer component for being tense and unpredictable. Ian Boudreau from PCGamesN said the game rewards players' knowledge with the four locations with success. Gunplay, however, received polarized reviews; Hussein called it "satisfying" while West called it "sluggish". The artificial intelligence was also criticized.

The art direction received acclaim. Hussein described Deathloop as a "fascinating mashup of styles and vibes", resulting in a striking art direction. He also praised the soundtrack for being "eclectic" and "raucous". Stuart also praised the visual design and the developers' attention to detail. He added Blackreef is a "theme-park dystopia" that paints a "glorious picture of a ruinous, elitist society and spectacle", compared with Dishonored's grim atmosphere. Purslow enjoyed the location design, adding they are "intricately detailed" and "dense with personality", and liked the way the time of day changes each location and that repeated playthroughs still evoke a constant sense of discovery. Hughes said the four levels become repetitive as players reach the latter half, and added these levels failed to push the players to use their powers smartly, unlike those from Dishonored 2, which continue introducing gameplay twists. Some critics liked the way conventional world-building tools such as in-game computer terminal chat logs and audio flies provide key information for players to progress.

Deathloop's story received generally positive reviews. Blake Hester from Game Informer praised the story and writing, calling the interactions between Colt and Julianna entertaining and humorous, and described the two as his favourite protagonists of the year. Hussein also liked the writing and noted the two characters share a complicated relationship, and he praised the voice actors Kelly and Akagha for their performances. Croft described the two protagonists as charismatic and noted their interactions are "funny and consistently touching". Christopher Byrd from Washington Post enjoyed the "campy" tone, though he felt that the story failed to create any urgency to break the time loop as all characters, including Colt, seemed to be indifferent to being trapped in a time loop. According to Purslow, Colt's personal storyline is not presented to players clearly enough, resulting in an abrupt ending. West also said the story does not reach a meaningful conclusion. Some critics compared the story and themes to those of The Seven Deaths of Evelyn Hardcastle (2018). The revelation Colt is Julianna's father was controversial because the two have flirtatious interactions during the opening segments.

=== Sales ===
In the UK, Deathloop was the best-selling retail game in its week of release, but it became the worst-performing Arkane game at launch, and its boxed sales were 5.6% lower than those of Prey. It was the sixth-best-selling video game in September 2021 in the US according to the NPD Group. Deathloop was the 18th-most-downloaded game on the PlayStation Store for 2021 in the US and Canada. Arkane stated it had reached five million players by February 2023.

=== Awards and accolades ===
Edge, Empire, GameSpot, GamesRadar+, and The Daily Telegraph selected Deathloop as their Game of the Year in 2021.

Awards and nominations
Year	Award	Category	Result	Ref.
2021	Golden Joystick Awards 2021	Best Multiplayer Game	Nominated	
2021	Golden Joystick Awards 2021	Best Performer (Jason Kelley as Colt Vahn)	Nominated	
2021	Golden Joystick Awards 2021	Best Performer (Ozioma Akagha as Juliana Blake)	Nominated	
2021	Golden Joystick Awards 2021	PlayStation Game of the Year	Nominated	
2021	Golden Joystick Awards 2021	Ultimate Game of the Year	Nominated	
2021	Golden Joystick Awards 2021	Critics Choice Award	Won	
2021	The Game Awards 2021	Game of the Year	Nominated	
2021	The Game Awards 2021	Best Game Direction	Won	
2021	The Game Awards 2021	Best Narrative	Nominated	
2021	The Game Awards 2021	Best Art Direction	Won	
2021	The Game Awards 2021	Best Score and Music	Nominated	
2021	The Game Awards 2021	Best Audio Design	Nominated	
2021	The Game Awards 2021	Best Performance (Jason Kelley as Colt Vahn)	Nominated	
2021	The Game Awards 2021	Best Performance (Ozioma Akagha as Juliana Blake)	Nominated	
2021	The Game Awards 2021	Best Action Game	Nominated	
2021	2021 Titanium Awards	Game of the Year	Nominated	
2021	2021 Titanium Awards	Best Game Design	Nominated	
2021	2021 Titanium Awards	Best Narrative Design	Nominated	
2021	2021 Titanium Awards	Best Art Direction	Won	
2022	The Steam Awards	Most Innovative Gameplay	Won	
2022	11th New York Game Awards	Big Apple Award for Best Game of the Year	Nominated	
2022	11th New York Game Awards	Great White Way Award for Best Acting in a Game (Ozioma Akagha as Juliana Blake)	Nominated	
2022	2022 SXSW Gaming Awards	Excellence in Animation, Art, & Visual Achievement	Nominated	
2022	2022 SXSW Gaming Awards	Excellence in Game Design	Nominated	
2022	2022 SXSW Gaming Awards	Excellence in Narrative	Nominated	
2022	22nd Game Developers Choice Awards	Game of the Year	Nominated	
2022	22nd Game Developers Choice Awards	Best Audio	Nominated	
2022	22nd Game Developers Choice Awards	Best Design	Nominated	
2022	22nd Game Developers Choice Awards	Innovation Award	Nominated	
2022	22nd Game Developers Choice Awards	Best Narrative	Nominated	
2022	22nd Game Developers Choice Awards	Best Visual Art	Nominated	
2022	25th Annual D.I.C.E. Awards	Game of the Year	Nominated	
2022	25th Annual D.I.C.E. Awards	Action Game of the Year	Nominated	
2022	25th Annual D.I.C.E. Awards	Outstanding Achievement in Game Direction	Won	
2022	25th Annual D.I.C.E. Awards	Outstanding Achievement in Game Design	Nominated	
2022	25th Annual D.I.C.E. Awards	Outstanding Achievement in Animation	Nominated	
2022	25th Annual D.I.C.E. Awards	Outstanding Achievement in Art Direction	Nominated	
2022	25th Annual D.I.C.E. Awards	Outstanding Achievement in Character (Colt Vahn)	Nominated	
2022	25th Annual D.I.C.E. Awards	Outstanding Achievement in Original Music Composition	Nominated	
2022	Pégases Awards	Best Game	Won	
2022	Pégases Awards	Best Artistic Design	Won	
2022	Pégases Awards	Best Sound Design	Nominated	
2022	Pégases Awards	Best Narrative Design	Nominated	
2022	Pégases Awards	Best Game Design	Won	
2022	Pégases Awards	Best Game Setting	Won	
2022	Pégases Awards	Audience Award	Won	
2022	18th British Academy Games Awards	Best Game	Nominated	
2022	18th British Academy Games Awards	Audio Achievement	Nominated	
2022	18th British Academy Games Awards	Game Design	Nominated	
2022	18th British Academy Games Awards	Music	Nominated	
2022	18th British Academy Games Awards	Original Property	Nominated	
2022	18th British Academy Games Awards	EE Game of the Year	Nominated	
2022	18th British Academy Games Awards	Performer in a Leading Role (Jason Kelley as Colt Vahn)	Nominated	
2022	18th British Academy Games Awards	Performer in a Leading Role (Ozioma Akagha as Juliana Blake)	Nominated	
2022	20th Game Audio Network Guild Awards	Best New Original IP Audio	Nominated	
2022	20th Game Audio Network Guild Awards	Best Original Song ( “Déjà Vu” by Sencit & FJØRA)	Won	
2022	20th Game Audio Network Guild Awards	Music of the Year (Tom Salta, Erich Talaba, Ross Tregenza)	Nominated	
2022	20th Game Audio Network Guild Awards	Audio of the Year	Nominated	
2022	20th Game Audio Network Guild Awards	Best Game Audio Presentation Podcast or Broadcast (Scoring AAA: Deathloop Edition by Tom Salta)	Nominated	
2022	Develop:Star Awards 2022	Best Game	Nominated	
2022	Develop:Star Awards 2022	Best Studio (Arkane Studios)	Nominated	
2022	Develop:Star Awards 2022	Best Audio	Nominated	
2022	Develop:Star Awards 2022	Best Game Design	Nominated	
2022	Develop:Star Awards 2022	Best Narrative	Nominated	
2022	Develop:Star Awards 2022	Best Original IP	Won	
2022	2022 Global Industry Game Awards	3D Environment Art	Won	
2022	2022 Global Industry Game Awards	UI Art	Won	
2022	2022 Global Industry Game Awards	Music Composition	Won	
2022	2022 Global Industry Game Awards	Voice Acting	Won	
2022	2022 Global Industry Game Awards	Systems Design	Won	
2022	2022 Global Industry Game Awards	UI/UX	Won	
2022	2022 Global Industry Game Awards	Audio Technology	Won	
2022	2022 Global Industry Game Awards	System Technology	Won	
2022	2022 Global Industry Game Awards	Marketing	Won	
2022	2022 Global Industry Game Awards	Production/Management	Won	
2022	2022 Global Industry Game Awards	Quality Assurance	Won	
2022	2022 Global Industry Game Awards	Research & Analytics	Won	
2022	2022 Global Industry Game Awards	Representation	Won	
