= Dark Messiah of Might and Magic =

2006 video game

- Developers: Arkane Studios; Ubisoft Annecy (Xbox 360)
- Publisher: Ubisoft
- Director: Raphaël Colantonio
- Producer: Julien Roby
- Programmer: Sebastien Scieux
- Artist: Daniel Balage
- Writers: Richard E. Dansky; Jeffrey Spock
- Composers: Sascha Dikiciyan; Cris Velasco
- Series: Might and Magic
- Engine: Source
- Platforms: Microsoft Windows, Xbox 360
- Release: 24 October 2006: Windows; NA: 24 October 2006; EU: 27 October 2006; AU: 2 November 2006 Xbox 360; NA: 12 February 2008; PAL: 15 February 2008
- Genre: Action role-playing game
- Modes: Single-player, multiplayer

Dark Messiah of Might and Magic (labeled as Dark Messiah: Might and Magic; additionally subtitled Elements on Xbox 360) is a first-person action role-playing game developed by Arkane Studios. The player controls Sareth, the apprentice of the wizard Phenrig, after he is sent to the city of Stonehelm to accompany an expedition trying to retrieve a powerful artifact known as "The Skull of Shadows".

Dark Messiah of Might and Magic was released in 2006 on PC, and Dark Messiah of Might and Magic: Elements was released later in 2008 for the Xbox 360. It adds new levels in the single-player campaign, a revamped multiplayer mode, numerous bug-fixes, and adjustments for the console experience.

== Gameplay ==
The player attacks a Pao kai.

Enemies are generally difficult to kill in straightforward combat, although characters developed for this purpose may have an easier time. Characters who develop their stealth skills can sneak up behind unaware enemies and perform a lethal backstab maneuver, while characters that have skill with a bow can use it to snipe enemies from a distance. Developing a character for resilience and strength for melee combat is still possible and completely viable, but even with proper specialization, successful close combat requires careful application of tactics, timing, accuracy, and properly using a range of close-quarters offensive techniques. Particularly, the player character's ability to kick enemies and knock them back is emphasized by environmental hazards such as spike racks, open fires, and pitfalls being in almost every combat area, which can often end a fight more efficiently than using only weapon attacks.

For players who build their character to specialize in Magic, spells can be used to unleash offensive effects, heal the player character, or serve a number of utility purposes. Each use of a spell consumes varying amounts of the player's mana, which gradually regenerates over time, but can be replenished more quickly through consumption of mana potions.

As the player completes objectives throughout the game, Dark Messiah awards experience points that can be used to buy skills in one of three skill trees: Combat, Magic, and Miscellaneous. The Combat tree improves the power and efficiency of physical attacks. The Magic tree grants access to new spells. The Miscellaneous tree contains general utility improvements, including Stealth.

Although some enemies will drop usable items when killed, looting in Dark Messiah is mostly a fixed affair. Valuable items are placed in specific locations for the player to find. Each item has fixed stats, and the selection of items is also limited, with only a relatively small number of different weapons or armor in each category. Additionally, advanced items typically have a skill requirement, with the end result being that the character equips only a handful of different items over the course of the one play-through, depending on what skills they have chosen to develop on their character.

=== Multiplayer ===
Dark Messiah features a multiplayer mode where opposing teams battle each other and earn points by performing strategic maneuvers across a large map. There are two playable factions, consisting of humans and undead, along with five playable classes. A character customization system is present, with the limitation that players must select a predefined class and may only buy skills available for that class.

There is also a Colosseum mode, in which players fight take turns to fight one-on-one duels, while the other players sit in the audience. When players are not battling in the current match, they can bet XP on the outcome of the current duel.

== Plot ==
=== Setting ===
Nearly a thousand years ago the Wars of Fire raged across the face of Ashan. Men, Elves, Dwarves, and their allies pitted themselves against the hordes of Demons. Great devastation was wrought, but in the end the allied forces were victorious. Their victory was largely due to the heroic sacrifice of the wizard known as Sar-Elam, the Seventh Dragon. Using his almost god-like powers and supported by his fellow wizards, Sar-Elam cast the Demons out of the world into a limbo of eternal fire. From the essence of his spirit, Sar-Elam wove a prison to contain the Demons forever. Something went wrong during Sar-Elams ritual, however. The magic he summoned failed to create a complete prison; the tiniest of flaws remained in the otherwise impervious barrier, a weakness that allowed Demonic influence to seep into the world during times of a lunar eclipse. Angry but patient, the Demons lurked in their prison waiting ... and planning.

All that remained of the Seventh Dragon was his skull. Now called the Skull of Shadows, it was spirited away by those loyal to the goddess Mother Asha, creator of the world and source of all magic. They hid it in an ancient temple on a deserted island, far from the machinations of Men, Elves, or Demons. There the Skull sits, awaiting the day when its powers might be needed again.

67 years after Sar-Elam's death, his disciple Sar-Shazzar prophesied that a half-demon, half-human child would one day be born; a walker between worlds who would be known as the "Dark Messiah" and would use the relics of the Seventh Dragon to shatter the Demons' prison forever.

969 years after Sar-Elam's death, after the young king Nicolai Griffin was killed by a demon renegade, the demon sovereign, Kha-Beleth impregnated Nicolai's former-fiancée, Isabel Greyhound, and before she could have been saved, she gave birth to the Dark Messiah.

20 years later, Sareth's story begins.

=== Story ===
The protagonist of Dark Messiah is a young man named Sareth, who is under the tutelage of the Wizard Phenrig. After years of studying the arts of magic and physical training in the arts of war, he is finally taken on an expedition to retrieve a rare artifact known as the Shantiri Crystal. After finding the Crystal and disposing of the would-be rival expedition, Sareth is tasked to bring the crystal to an associate of Phenrig's, the Wizard Menelag, who is also the lord of the city of Stonehelm. Menelag and Phenrig have certain "mutual interests" that involve finding an artifact called the Skull of Shadows. Menelag apparently is unable to continue his search without the Crystal. To guide him on his way, a spirit named Xana will reside in Sareth's mind.

Shortly after arriving in Stonehelm, Sareth witnesses an undead cyclops and a small army of ghouls sent by the Necromancers breach Stonehelm's defenses and begin to overwhelm the guards. Sareth is recruited to help in the defense effort by taking control of a ballista. Using this, he manages to stun the undead cyclops long enough for a guard to stab it in the eye, thus killing it. Seeing their most valuable asset destroyed, the remnants of the invading force beat a hasty retreat. Sareth then resumes his search for Menelag. Upon reaching the front gate of Menelag's manor, Sareth is greeted by Leanna, the young niece and pupil of Menelag. That night, the three enjoy a small feast in Sareth's honor after which Menelag informs Sareth that they will set sail the following morning to resume the search for the Skull.

In the middle of the night, the crystal is stolen by a ghoul, who murders Menelag in the process. Sareth then chases the ghoul to a warehouse, where he finds the necromancer Arantir using the crystal's power to open a portal to Nar-Heresh, the necromancer city. Sareth manages to steal the crystal back and escape to the docks, where he falls asleep. In a dream, he recalls his meeting with Phenrig, except that Phenrig is saying that he does not trust Sareth on this mission alone and says that he needs someone to "hold his leash" as he summons Xana. In the dream, Xana appears to be a demon and attacks Sareth. Sareth and Leanna leave Stonehelm by boat and travel to the island with the Skull of Shadows. While en route, Sareth has another dream in which he kills Leanna, and Arantir alludes that she is only the first of many victims.

After arriving, they find the expedition destroyed, and most of the men dead, killed by Orc warriors. Sareth and Leanna are chased into the Temple of the Skull by a Pao kai which Sareth kills a little later with a gate, and Sareth proceeds alone to the top of the Temple, where he places the Shantiri Crystal, and defeats the Orc chief Aratok in a duel. Arantir then reveals himself and appears to kill Leanna. Sareth, however, escapes to the crypt below and retrieves the Skull of Shadows. Sareth then has a vision of the Demon Sovereign Kha-Beleth, who reveals himself to be Sareth's father. Kha-Beleth names Sareth the Dark Messiah, and then commands to be released using the power of the Skull. Sareth wakes up to see Arantir, who takes the skull and then impales Sareth on a spike.

Fueled by Xana's demonic power, Sareth wakes up alive and gains the power to transform into a demon, which grants him uncanny strength at the cost of health. Stripped of all his belongings, Sareth uses the demon form to fight off the Orc guards as he recovers his items. He manages to leave the island and returns to Stonehelm. Once there, he takes the portal to Nar-Heresh. There, Sareth witnesses Leanna - who is still alive - being thrown into a spider pit. Saving Leanna is optional, but impacts the possible endings that the player may receive. Regardless of the player's choice, Sareth discovers Arantir's plans to sacrifice the entire population of Stonehelm in order to permanently seal Kha-Beleth's prison.

Sareth then returns to a besieged Stonehelm, fighting alongside the remaining human resistance. If Leanna was rescued in the previous chapter, Sareth may visit the sanctuary in order to purge Xana from his body. If Sareth proceeds with the cleansing, he loses the ability to transform into a demon, but gains the ability to use powerful holy weapons. If Sareth is unable or unwilling to undergo the cleansing ritual, nothing will change. Whatever the case, the choice determines which endings the player may receive.

In the ancient necropolis over which Stonehelm was built, Sareth is eventually reunited with Leanna. If the player left her behind in the spider pit, she appears as a Lich, who Sareth then destroys. If Sareth saved her, but did not cleanse himself, she will attack him. If Leanna was rescued and Sareth cleansed himself, she will join Sareth in the final chapter.

Sareth then makes his way through the necropolis and eventually catches up with Arantir as he is about to perform the ritual. When Sareth attacks Arantir, he summons his Avatar of Death, also seen in Heroes V: Tribes of the East (the dragon in Dark Messiah does resemble a pao kai but it is still uncertain as to what the dragon really is). Sareth fights off the Dragon, which forces Arantir to perform a resummoning, during which Arantir is vulnerable. Eventually Arantir is defeated, leaving Sareth to make his final decision for the Skull.

The player may use the Skull to lock his father away forever, or destroy the Skull and free his father. Each option offers a different ending. The ensuing cut scene will vary slightly depending on whether it is Leanna or Xana that accompanies Sareth at the end of the game, giving the game a total of four different endings.

== Development ==
Critical praise of Arkane's previous game, Arx Fatalis, gave the opportunity for them to work with Valve to develop a new title on their Source engine, and Raphaël Colantonio opted to make a sequel, Arx Fatalis 2. However, the poor sales of the first game made it difficult to find a publisher. They were approached by Ubisoft and asked to apply the Arx Fatalis game engine to their Might and Magic. This became Dark Messiah of Might and Magic. It refined the first-person melee combat of Arx Fatalis with a lesser emphasis on role-playing elements.

=== German censorship ===
Despite having received a "no youth release" rating from the USK, Ubisoft announced that the two German versions of Dark Messiah will contain some changes from the internationally released version. Specifically, the German version does not allow for enemies' heads or limbs to be severed, enemies cannot be impaled after death, and burning enemies will die immediately, with their corpses cannot be mutilated further after death. Ubisoft separately released a limited edition "International Version" of the game (playable in English only) which is identical to the version of the game released in most other countries, and which was also released in Germany. However, since then the Bundesprüfstelle has declared, after an examination in February 2008, that the uncensored version of the game, though heavily relying on melee combat and displaying violent content, is not harmful to minors, as equal importance is laid on the setting in a fantasy world and the elaborated storyline. In a second attempt, the original version secured a "no youth release" rating with the USK, though this now rated version has yet to be released in Germany.

== Reception ==
Reception

Aggregate score
Aggregator	Score	
Aggregator	PC	Xbox 360
Metacritic	72/100	52/100

Review scores
Publication	Score	
Publication	PC	Xbox 360
Computer Games Magazine	3/5	N/A
Edge	7/10	N/A
Eurogamer	8/10	6/10
Famitsu	N/A	(X360) 27/40; 22/40
Game Informer	9.25/10	8/10
GamePro	3/5	N/A
GameRevolution	N/A	D+
GameSpot	6.7/10	3.5/10
GameSpy	3/5	1.5/5
GameTrailers	8.1/10	5.8/10
GameZone	7/10	N/A
IGN	(AU) 8.8/10 (US) 7/10	5.7/10
Official Xbox Magazine (US)	N/A	4.5/10
PC Gamer (US)	49%	N/A
411Mania	N/A	8.1/10
The Sydney Morning Herald	3.5/5	N/A

Critical reaction to Dark Messiah has been divided, particularly between the US and the rest of the world. The game received "mixed or average reviews" on both platforms according to the review aggregation website Metacritic.

Game Informer praised the PC version for the sheer fun factor and beautiful graphics. In contrast, GameSpot said that it had many technical issues, repetitive gameplay, predictable story, and poor multiplayer. The Australian video game talk show Good Game's two reviewers both gave the game an 8/10. Also, Hyper commended the game for its "telekinesis, great combat and being lovely to look at", but criticized it for "poor non-human combat [and] bugger all story".

For Elements, IGN noted that it simplified the original game's role-playing element; players in Elements must choose one of four predetermined character classes that gain skills according to their specialty. GameSpot criticized the game's control problems and graphics, stating that it "may be the ugliest game powered by [the] Source engine". In Japan, where the game was ported for release under the name Might and Magic: Elements (マイト･アンド･マジック エレメンツ, Maito ando Majikku Erementsu) on 17 July 2008, Famitsu gave it a score of 22 out of 40, while Famitsu X360 gave it each a score of two sevens, one six, and one seven.

GameSpot nominated Elements for the dubious award of Flat-Out Worst Game in its 2008 video game awards.

== Sequel ==
In an interview on 15 August 2012, with Dutch game site Gamer.nl, Might & Magic creative director Erwan le Breton mentioned they were discussing a possible sequel to Dark Messiah. However, as of October 2015, Arkane Studios has left Ubisoft and the Might & Magic team was still searching for a new studio to take over the sequel.
