= International Mobile Gaming Awards =

Annual video game award ceremony

The International Mobile Gaming Awards ("IMGA") is an annual competition and awards ceremony that honors outstanding games made for mobile devices. It is the longest standing international competition for mobile games. Notable IMGA winners include Candy Crush Saga and Monument Valley.

The best mobile games submissions are awarded at the prize-giving IMGA ceremony, which takes place in various cities across the United States and Asia. IMGA was founded by Maarten Noyons in 2004 and is headquartered in Marseilles, France.

== History ==
In 2004 the mobile games industry was still finding its feet. As developers began carving out a space in the market, the French division of Discreet announced the first "International 3D Mobile Gaming Competition." With over $50,000 of prizes to be won, the contest was designed by NCC Partners CEO Maarten Noyons to help showcase young mobile games and was supported by Nokia, Orange, Intel, IBM and more.

With 85 entries, the awards took place on 3 February 2004, at the IMAGINA festival in Monte Carlo. There were four categories: Grand Prix, 16MB, 1MB, 200K/native, and 200K/Java. Later that year, Discreet was acquired by Autodesk who decided to close the French office – and thus the competition. However, Noyons convinced Discreet to let him take full control of the event and in doing so he founded IMGA as it's known today.

Renaming the event the International Mobile Gaming Awards, Noyons has grown IMGA into a worldwide competition. Each year, the awards now receive around 1,000 submissions, 600 of which are usually submitted to the jury. Over a two-day judging process, the entrants are whittled down to 60 nominees.

For ten years the winners were announced at the GSMA's Mobile World Congress in Barcelona, but the 11th IMGA saw the ceremony moved to GDC in San Francisco, during the Game Developers Conference and Game Connection.

In 2016, the competition added a new category for VR games and announced 102 nominations and 11 categories. Sam Barlow won the Grand Prix that year with Her Story, a detective game.

After Europe and the US, the IMGA has launched its program in China in 2015 and Southeast Asia in 2016 creating two additional competitions: IMGA Southeast Asia in partnership with Malaysia Digital Economy Corporation (MDEC) and IMGA China in partnership with Migu – China Mobile's digital content entity, and co-hosted by MyGamez, a publisher for foreign mobile games in China.

== Judging session ==
The judging process takes place in Marseilles, France in January every year. Jury members are invited to review and play all submitted games and select the nominees. The main judging criteria are the mechanics of the gameplay, the quality of the sound design and visual art and the originality in storytelling.

IMGA is open to entries from all mobile games developers. Past participants include students, researchers, artists, individual developers and publishers. The winners of each of eight category are decided by an international jury of experts and journalists from Asia, the US and Europe.

Past judges include industry veterans such as King's former games guru Tommy Palm, Dean Takahashi of VentureBeat, and Unity Evangelist Oscar Clark

== Award categories ==
The awards celebrate innovation and creativity in mobile games worldwide. Based on their merit, games are recognized in a variety of categories that are decided on by the jury, when they meet each year for the judging process. The categories for the 2020 International Mobile Gaming Awards included:

- Best AR Game
- Best Game for 5G
- Best Meaningful Play
- Best Quickplay Game
- Best Technical Achievement
- Best VR Game
- Excellence in Art
- Excellence in Audio
- Excellence in Design
- Excellence in Gameplay
- Excellence in Innovation
- Excellence in Storytelling

== Winners ==
The following games won the "Grand Prix" at their respective IMGA ceremonies, the award that recognises the best mobile game of that year's nominees.

Aside from the main categories and the Grand Prix, there are two more prizes. These include the "People's Choice" award, which was introduced in 2008, for the game that receives the most votes from the general public; while the jury's "Honorable Mention" was introduced in 2012, for the game the judges believe deserves extra credit.

=== 2020 ===
Award	Winner	Manufacturer	Ref.
Grand Prix	Sky: Children of the Light	Thatgamecompany	
Jury's Honorable Mention	Sayonara Wild Hearts	Annapurna Interactive	
People's Choice	Hados 2	Mehdi Peighaminasab	
Excellence in Art	The Gardens Between	The Voxel Agents	
Best Game for 5G	Dragon Raja	Loong Entertainment	
Best AR Game	Angry Birds AR: Isle of Pigs	Rovio Entertainment	
Excellence in Innovation	What the Golf?	Triband	
Best Quickplay Game	Archero	Habby	
Excellence in Audio	Alien: Blackout	D3 Go	
Excellence in Gameplay	Call of Duty: Mobile	Activision	
Excellence in Storytelling	Forgotton Anne	Hitcents	
Best Meaningful Play	Dear Reader	Local No. 12	
Best Technical Achievement	Call of Duty: Mobile	Activision	
Best VR Game	Acron: Attack of the Squirrels!	Resolution Games	
Excellence in Design	Figment: Journey Into the Mind	Mobaso	

=== 2019 ===
Award	Winner	Manufacturer	Ref.
Grand Prix	Florence	Annapurna Interactive	
Jury's Honorable Mention	Flipping Filip	Deema Games	
People's Choice	Cooking Diary: Restaurant Game	Mytona	
Best Multiplayer Game	Brawl Stars	Supercell	
Best Quickplay Game	Oddman	JoyPac	
Best Feel Good Game	Valleys Between	Little Lost Fox	
Excellence in Audio	Eloh	Broken Rules	
Excellence in Gameplay	Bring You Home	Alike Studio	
Excellence in Storytelling	Florence	Annapurna Interactive	
Excellence in Visual Art and Design	Chuchel	Amanita Design	
Excellence in Innovation	Gladiabots	GFX47	
Best Meaningful Play	Florence	Ustwo	
Best Technical Achievement	Asphalt 9: Legends	Gameloft	
Best VR Game	Narrows	Resolution Games	
Guilty Pleasure	Bacon - The Game	Kamibox	
Best Upcoming Game	Agatha Knife	Plug In Digital	

=== 2018 ===
Award	Winner	Manufacturer	Ref.
Grand Prix	N/A		
Jury's Honorable Mention	Hidden Folks	Adriaan de Jongh	
People's Choice	Life Is Strange	Square Enix	
Excellence in Innovation	Splitter Critters	RAC7	
Best Multiplayer Game	Arena of Valor	TiMi Studio Group	
Best Quickplay Game	Tiny Bubbles	Pine Street Codeworks	
Excellence in Audio	Virtual Virtual Reality	Tender Claws	
Excellence in Gameplay	Framed 2	Loveshack Entertainment	
Excellence in Storytelling	The Witch's Isle	Cocosola	
Excellence in Art	Tokaido	Asmodee	
Best Meaningful Play	Bury Me, My Love	Arte France	
Best VR Game	Virtual Virtual Reality	Tender Claws	
Guilty Pleasure	Death Coming	NExT Studios	
Best Upcoming Game	The Enchanted World	Noodlecake Studios	
Best Port to Mobile	The Witness	Thekla, Inc	
Game Artist of 2017	Old Man's Journey	Broken Rules	

=== 2017 ===
Award	Winner	Manufacturer	Ref.
Grand Prix	Pokémon Go	Niantic, Inc.	
Jury's Honorable Mention	Mekorama	Martin Magni	
People's Choice	Skygarden: Farm In Paradise	VNG Games Studio	
Excellence in Innovation	Human Resource Machine	Experimental Gameplay Project	
Best Multiplayer Game	Clash Royale	Supercell	
Best Quickplay Game	Conduct This!	Northplay	
Excellence in Visual Art	Invisible, Inc.	Klei Entertainment	
Excellence in Audio	Crypt of the NecroDancer	Brace Yourself Games	
Excellence in Gameplay	The Battle of Polytopia	Midjiwan	
Excellence in Storytelling	Reigns	Devolver Digital	
Best Meaningful Play	1979 Revolution: Black Friday	iNK Stories	
Best Technical Achievement	Dawn of Titans	NaturalMotion	
Best VR Game	Wands	Multivrses AB	
Guilty Pleasure	Steppy Pants	Super Entertainment	
Best Upcoming Game	Steamburg	Mariusz Szypura	
Game Artist of 2016	Dawn of Titans	NaturalMotion	

=== 2016 ===
Award	Winner	Manufacturer	Ref.
Grand Prix	Her Story	Sam Barlow	
Jury's Honorable Mention	LongStory	Miriam Verburg	
People's Choice	Shadowmatic	Triada Studio	
Excellence in Innovation	Her Story	Sam Barlow	
Best Multiplayer Game	Agar.io	Miniclip	
Best Quickplay Game	Smashy Road: Wanted	Bearbit Studios	
Excellence in Gameplay	Badland 2	Frogmind Games	
Excellence in Storytelling	Her Story	Sam Barlow	
Best Meaningful Play	This War of Mine	11 bit studios	
Best Technical Achievement	Shadowmatic	Triada Studio	
Best VR Game	Land's End	Adrienne Law	
Guilty Pleasure	Fallout Shelter	Bethesda Softworks	
Best Upcoming Game	Clash Royale	Supercell	
Excellence in Audio, Visual Art & Design	Lumino City	State of Play Games	

=== 2015 ===
Award	Winner	Manufacturer	Ref.
Grand Prix	Monument Valley	Ustwo	
Jury's Honorable Mention	Threes!	Sirvo LLC	
People's Choice	Vainglory	Super Evil Megacorp	
Excellence in Innovation	Bounden	Game Oven	
Best Multiplayer Game	Soccer Physics	Otto-Ville Ojala	
Best Quickplay Game	Crossy Road	Hipster Whale	
Excellence in Gameplay	Hearthstone	Blizzard Entertainment	
Excellence in Storytelling	80 Days	inkle	
Best Meaningful Play	Papers, Please	Lucas Pope	
Best Technical Achievement	Vainglory	Super Evil Megacorp	
Guilty Pleasure	2048	Gabrielle Cirulli	
Best Upcoming Game	Prune	Polyculture	
Excellence in Audio, Visual Art & Design	Tengami	Nyamyam	

=== 2014 ===
Award	Winner	Manufacturer	Ref.
Grand Prix	Badland	Frogmind Games	
Jury's Honorable Mention	Luxuria Superbia	Tale of Tales	
People's Choice	Tiny Thief	Rovio Stars	
Excellence in Innovation	Blek	Kunabi Brother	
Best Quickplay Game	Colossatron: Massive World Threat	Halfbrick Studios	
Excellence in Gameplay	Rymdkapsel	Grapefrukt	
Excellence in Storytelling	République	Camouflaj	
Best Technical Achievement	Clumsy Ninja	Natural Motion	
Best Upcoming Game	Framed	Loveshack Entertainment	
Best Serious Game	Artistico: The Game for Art Lovers	PlayArt Labs	
Best Shared Experience in a Game	Heads Up!	Warner Bros	
Excellence in Sound Design	Papa Sangre II	Somethin' Else	
Excellence in Art Design	Year Walk	Simogo	

=== 2013 ===
Award	Winner	Manufacturer	Ref.
Grand Prix	The Walking Dead	Telltale Games	
Jury's Honorable Mention	Devil's Attorney, Zombies Run!	1337 Game Design, Six to Start	
People's Choice	The Room	Fireproof Games	
Excellence in Innovation	Spaceteam	Henry Smith	
Excellence in Visuals	The Room	Fireproof Games	
Excellence in Storytelling	The Walking Dead	Telltale Games	
Excellence in Gameplay	Fairway Solitaire	Big Fish Games	
Best Social Game	Candy Crush Saga	King	
Best Serious Game	DragonBox Algebra 5+	WeWantToKnow	

=== 2012 ===
Award	Winner	Manufacturer	Ref.
Grand Prix	Infinity Blade II	Epic Games	
Jury's Honorable Mention	Contre Jour	Chillingo	
People's Choice	Flick Tennis: College Wars	Rolocule Games	
Excellence in Gameplay	Infinity Blade II	Epic Games	
Most Innovative Game	Superbrothers: Sword & Sworcery EP	Capybara Games	
Best Sports Game	Touchgrind BMX	Illusion Labs	
Best Real World Game	Meatspace Invasion	C4M & Mekensleep	
Best Mobile Social Game	Charadium II	On5	
Best Casual Game	Sprinkle	Mediocre AB	

=== 2011 ===
Award	Winner	Manufacturer	Ref.
Grand Prix	Beyond Ynth	FDG Entertainment	
People's Choice	Perfect Cell	Mobigame	
Excellence in Gameplay	Beyond Ynth	FDG Entertainment	
Operators Choice	Snowboard Hero	Fishlabs	
Excellence in Design	Infinity Blade	Epic Games	
Most Innovative Game	Papa Sangre	Somethin' Else	
Best Sports Game	Snowboard Hero	Fishlabs	
Best Real World Game	AR Invaders	Soulbit7	
Best Casual Game	Plants vs. Zombies	PopCap Games	

=== 2009 ===
Award	Winner	Manufacturer	Ref.
Grand Prix	Labyrinth 2	Illusion Labs	
People's Choice	Bruce Lee Dragon Warrior	Digital Legends	
Operators Choice	Krazy Kart Racing	Polarbit	
Excellence in Connectivity	Sniper vs. Sniper	Com2uS	
Excellence in Design	Ancient Frog Jr.	Ancient Workshop	
Best Real World Game	Ulrike and Eamon Compliant	Blast Theory	
Best Casual Game	Wire Way	Now Production	
Excellence in Gameplay	MiniSquadron	Supermono	

=== 2008 ===
Award	Winner	Manufacturer	Ref.
Grand Prix	N/A		
People's Choice	Kroll	Digital Legends	
Excellence in 3D	Zen Bound	Secret Exit	
Excellence in Gameplay	Edge	Mobigame	
Special Innovation	Kodo Evolved	Jadestone	
Operators Choice	Edge	Mobigame	
Excellence in Connectivity	Real Racing	Firemint	
Best Real World Game	Fastfoot Challenge	Urban Team	
Best Casual Game	Tropical Towers	Mr.Goodliving	

=== 2007 ===
Award	Winner	Manufacturer	Ref.
Grand Prix	Metal Gear Solid Mobile	IdeaWorks3D	
People's Choice	WRC 3D	Firemint	
Best Licensed IP-Based Game	Furby Island	LemonQuest	
Excellence in 3D	ONE Sequel	Digital Legends	
Operators Choice	Metal Gear Solid Mobile	IdeaWorks3D	
Excellence in Connectivity	N/A		
Best Real World Game	N/A		
Best Casual Game	Treasure Arm	Tequila Mobile	
Excellence in Gameplay	Dirk Spanner and The Fallen Idol	Jadestone	

=== 2006 ===
Award	Winner	Manufacturer	Ref.
Grand Prix	Triangler	TNO	
Best Use of Flash	Crazy Matches	iks Mobile	
Best Interactive Experience	3D Tilt-A-World	Super Happy Fun Fun	
Best Use of Connectivity	Anima Wars	Anino Mobile	
Excellence in 3D	Mega Monster	Firemint	
Most Innovative Game	Triangler	TNO	

=== 2005 ===
Award	Winner	Manufacturer	Ref.
Grand Prix	AR Tennis	Human Interface Technology Laboratory NZ	
Excellence in Gameplay	Monkey Pole Climb	Paul Carruthers	
Best Artwork	3D World Warriors	Vaka	
Achievement	AR Tennis	Human Interface Technology Laboratory NZ	

=== 2004 ===
Award	Winner	Manufacturer	Ref.
Grand Prix	Burt	Exkee	
