= Dear Reader =

Dear Reader may refer to:

- A phrase used to respond to the reader in an advice column
- Dear Reader (band), a South African alternative pop band
- Dear Reader (video game), a 2019 video game
- "Dear Reader" (song), a song from the album Midnights by Taylor Swift
- Dear Reader (book), a 2014 book
