= Postknight =

2017 video game

- Logo of the Postknight game
- Developer: Kurechii
- Publisher: Kurechii
- Director: Yiwei P'ng
- Producer: Yiwei P'ng
- Designer: Lydia Ho
- Programmers: Kung Shin Hean, Low Jiahao, Lee Zhi Fei
- Artists: Mclelun Lee, Sapphire Wong, Edmond Phang
- Writer: Lydia Ho
- Composer: Falk Au Yeong
- Platforms: Android, iOS
- Release: WW: February 9, 2017
- Genres: RPG, Adventure
- Mode: Single-player

Postknight is a RPG mobile app that was created by Kurechii, a Malaysian game developing team. It was released for iOS and Android on February 9, 2017, after its beta testing period ended. The sequel of the game 'Postknight 2' was launched in December 2021.

== Gameplay ==
Players take on the role of a postknight, a postal worker that must fight their way past enemies such as wolves and bandits. During missions players control the postknight via three buttons that allow them to charge enemies, block their attacks, or heal wounds. After performing an action, players must wait a certain amount of time, typically only a few seconds, before they can perform that action again until the end of the mission. For each successful mission, players receive rewards which can be used to upgrade armor, weapons, and potions. Players can level up the postknight characters in 4 areas: strength (increases damage), agility (increases chances of dodging and landing critical hits), intelligence (increases magic defense and experience gain rate) and vitality (increases maximum health)

Another interesting game mechanic is relationship, wherein players can give gifts to certain female NPCs in the game and raise their heart meter with them, which will in turn result in the characters gifting items to the player if certain levels are reached. However, if player gifts wrong/unwanted gifts to the female NPC or do not talk to them for a while, the heart meter will drop.

== Reception ==
Gamezebo gave Postknight four out of five stars, stating that the game's pacing allowed for little downtime and near constant gameplay while also criticizing it for its repetitive nature. Common Sense Media rated the game at three stars, criticizing its repetitive gameplay and freemium options, while also stating that it was perfect for playing for small periods of time. TouchArcade also reviewed the app, naming it its "Game of the Week" during the app's first week of release.

Postknight was nominated and won the Grand Prix of the SEA International Mobile Gaming Awards 2017, making it the first ever winner of the SEA Grand Prix. By the end of the year, Postknight received Google Play's recognition as 'Google Play's Best Games of 2017'.
