= Radio Music Shop =

Defunct radio station in the United Kingdom

- United Kingdom
- Frequencies: Sky Digital: 0208; Live Stream

Programming
- Format: Contemporary

Ownership
- Owner: Somethin' Else

History
- First air date: 18 December 2006 – 5 October 2007

Links
- Website: www.radiomusicshop.com

Radio Music Shop was a UK radio station, based in London, that broadcast nationally on the Internet, and Sky Digital, alongside the Freeview platform in England, Wales and Southern Scotland, 24 hours a day, 7 days a week. It was claimed to be the world’s first retail radio station (i.e. a station that, rather than being funded by adverts, it is funded by album sales bought directly from the station). It broadcast from 18 December 2006 until 5 October 2007.

== History ==
The station was the brainchild of Sonita Alleyne and was created by Somethin' Else Sound Directions Ltd. It began broadcasting at 8am, 18 December 2006 with the first track being The Verve’s ‘Bitter Sweet Symphony’. Because of the sales nature of the station, the launch team was bought in drew on the success of shopping television channels and was headed by Director of Programming Marcus Railton, who had previously been responsible for Launch Managing the Sit-Up channels price-drop.tv and Speedauction TV. The station closed down on 5 October 2007 and was broadcasting a 1 kHz tone until 10 November 2007 when the station fell silent on Freeview.

== Programming ==
RMS played adult contemporary music to suit the listening habits of its demographic of 35- to 55-year-olds. Its presenters shared anecdotes, trivia and background about the tracks they are playing. It ran no adverts or news broadcasts. The playlist consisted of tracks from a range of genres from over the last 30 years. The playlist of the station reflected the collection of albums available to them, as well as the range of artists' back catalogs.

== Presenters ==
The presenters were:

- Nana Akua
- Shak
- Sean MacIntosh
- Marcus Railton
- Mark Ryes
- Ross Tilley
- Terry Doyle
- Eddie Matthews
- Dave Armstrong
- Lucy Irving
- Emma Mackie
- Charlie McArdle
- Nick Minter

== Regulation ==
As Radio Music Shop was an advert for its own services, it was governed by the Advertising Standards Authority and OFCOM, and had to abide by the ICSTIS code of practice due to its premium rate telephone number. As it did not carry any other commercials, it was not monitored by RAJAR.
