= Mekorama =

2016 video game

- Nintendo Switch cover art
- Developer: Martin Magni
- Publishers: Martin Magni; Rainy Frog (Note: For the Nintendo Switch, PlayStation 4, PlayStation Vita, and Xbox One ports)
- Designer: Martin Magni
- Programmer: Martin Magni
- Artist: Martin Magni
- Composer: Martin Magni
- Platforms: Android; iOS; Nintendo Switch; PlayStation 4; PlayStation Vita; Xbox One
- Release: iOS; Android; May 15, 2016; Nintendo Switch; PlayStation 4; PlayStation Vita; Xbox One; March 26, 2020
- Genre: Puzzle
- Mode: Single-player

Mekorama is a puzzle game developed by indie developer Martin Magni. Players control the movement of a robot through paths and various obstacles to reach the end of a level by tapping or clicking the screen. The game features a level editing tool, where players can create custom levels and share them online. The game was initially released for iOS and Android in 2016 and was later ported to the Nintendo Switch, PlayStation 4, PlayStation Vita, and Xbox One in 2020.

Mekorama was created by indie developer Martin Magni for 17 months, and was inspired by Monument Valley and Captain Toad: Treasure Tracker. Mekorama received generally favorable reviews, with critics praising its pay what you want marketing model and level editing feature but noted inconveniences with the gameplay. The game won the Jury's Honorable Mention award at the 13th International Mobile Gaming Awards.

== Gameplay ==
In Mekorama, the player controls a robot by navigating through pathways and obstacles to reach the end of a level, described as "mechanical dioramas". Players can tap to control where the player character (canonically called B or Bee), moves, pinch the screen to zoom in and out, and swipe the screen to show different angles of the diorama. Each level implements various gameplay mechanics, such as the ability to spin gears and slide blocks and platforms.

In addition to the 120 built-in levels, the game offers a level editing tool, which allow players to create and share their levels online. Players can access user-generated levels by scanning a QR code featured on their respective level cards. The game also includes a hint system, accessible by paying in-app purchases.

== Development ==
Mekorama was developed by Martin Magni, a Sweden-based indie game developer. He designed and programmed the game over the span of 17 months. In an interview, Magni stated that the game started in development as a "mashup of Minecraft and GTA", looking at "huge procedurally generated cities built entirely from blocks", and took inspiration from Monument Valley and Captain Toad: Treasure Tracker. Mekorama uses the secondary animation motion, which enables the player character to move more realistically.

Mekorama was released for iOS and Android on May 15, 2016. A VR port of the game was released for Android on November 8, 2016, supporting the Google Daydream VR headset. In 2020, ports for the Nintendo Switch, PlayStation 4, PlayStation Vita, and Xbox One were announced by publisher Rainy Frog; the game was released for those platforms on March 26, 2020.

== Reception ==
Reception

Aggregate score
Aggregator	Score
Metacritic	iOS: 81/100

Review scores
Publication	Score
Famitsu	30/40
Gamezebo	5/5
Nintendo Life	7/10
Nintendo World Report	7/10
Pocket Gamer	3/5
TouchArcade	4.5/5

The game received "generally favorable" reviews, according to review score aggregator platform Metacritic. Reviewers praised the game's animation, level editing feature, and marketing structure but criticized its awkward presentation and gameplay mechanics. TouchArcade listed Mekorama as one of the best mobile games of 2016. The game won the Jury's Honorable Mention award at the 13th International Mobile Gaming Awards.

Lian Amaris of Gamezebo praised the game for its design, writing that it is "expertly crafted". She praised the game's implementation of secondary animation through the player character's movement as "thoughtful" and "idiosyncratic", and found the level editing feature to be "inspiring", while noting "how challenging puzzle-making can be". Amaris also viewed the game's pay what you want marketing model positively, writing that it is "one of the best" and "most fair" she has seen.

Chris Carter of TouchArcade praised the game's level editing feature, describing it to be "pretty nifty", and favored the game's "refreshing" marketing scheme. Pocket Gamer's Harry Slater compared Mekorama to Monument Valley, writing that while it offers more content than the latter, he found some of its gameplay mechanics to be "downright frustrating". Slater added that the game's camera system felt "clunky", and criticized the game's presentation, saying that it "lacks any of the ingenuity" that made Monument Valley compelling. Ollie Reynolds of Nintendo Life thought the game was "remarkably clever and charming", though he found "a few quirks" present throughout. He praised the controls of the game for its simplicity, but found the camera system to be "frustrating at times".
