= Sonita Alleyne =

British businesswoman (born 1968)

Sonita Alleyne OBE FRSA

41st Master of Jesus College, Cambridge
- Incumbent
- Assumed office 1 October 2019
- Preceded by: Ian H. White

Personal details
- Born: 1968 (age 57–58) Bridgetown, Barbados
- Relations: Jade Alleyne (niece)
- Education: Fitzwilliam College, Cambridge (BA, 1988)

Sonita Alleyne (born 1968) is the British co-founder and former CEO of Somethin' Else, a cross-platform media production company. Alleyne is a member of the BBC Trust, the governing body of the British Broadcasting Corporation, and in 2019 was elected Master of Jesus College, Cambridge, becoming the first woman to hold the post since the founding of the college in 1496, as well as the first black leader of an Oxbridge college.

== Early life, education and early career ==
Alleyne was born in Bridgetown, Barbados. At the age of three, she moved with her parents to Walthamstow, England, and later attended the nearby Leyton Manor School and Leyton Senior High School. She graduated from Fitzwilliam College, Cambridge (1985–88), with a B.A. degree in philosophy, and began working as a financial adviser for Royal Life. A year later, she joined Jazz FM's publicity department and, in her two years at the station, proceeded to become a trainee producer.

== Career ==
In 1991, Alleyne set up Somethin' Else, a music publicity business (named after the jazz album by Cannonball Adderley), with former colleagues Jez Nelson and Chris Philips. The company produced original content for the BBC and commercial radio. As CEO, Alleyne led many projects herself, including the development of Radio Music Shop, the world's first retail radio station. By 2008, Somethin’ Else was, according to The Independent, "the biggest syndicator of radio programmes in the UK, outside of the BBC, distributing shows to more than 200 radio stations in 65 countries".

In October 2009, Alleyne stepped down as chief executive and continued as a non-executive director. Her co-founder Jez Nelson succeeded her as CEO.

Since 2008, Alleyne has chaired the national arts charity Sound and Music and the Radio Sector Skills Council. She is a member of the Court of Governors at the University of the Arts London and a trustee of the Islington Arts and Media Trust. She sits on the UK Culture Committee for UNESCO and contributes to the Government Department for Work and Pensions as a member of the London Skills and Employment Board and the National Employment Panel. She has been a judge for the Precious Awards, which celebrate the entrepreneurial achievements of black women, and the Sony Awards.

In February 2012, she was appointed as a non-executive director of Archant, a media group. In July 2012, the Government announced that Alleyne would join the BBC Trust, the governing body of the corporation.

Alleyne has been a board member of the London Legacy Development Corporation since April 2012. In 2019, she was appointed Chair of the British Board of Film Classification.

In May 2019, she was elected Master of Jesus College, Cambridge, taking up the post in October 2019. She is the first woman to hold the role, 40 years after the college began admitting women as undergraduates.

Alleyne praised the work of the Jesus College legacies of slavery working party (LSWP), whose work relating to the courtier Tobias Rustat, commemorated in the chapel, has been criticised by Charles Moore in The Spectator. It was reported that the college had spent £120,000 trying to remove the Tobias Rustat wall monument as part of an investigation into his role in the slave trade. Alleyne also oversaw the return of Okukor, a Benin Bronze statue, to Nigeria.

October 2019 also saw Alleyne's influence recognised, with her inclusion in the 2020 dPowerlist, an annual publication listing the 100 most influential Black Britons. Her inclusion remained for the 2021 edition of the powerlist, in recognition of her work in the education sector.

== Awards and recognition ==
In 2000, Alleyne received the Award of Excellence from the European Federation of Black Women Business Owners. In 2002, she won the Carlton Multicultural Achievement Award for TV and Radio. She is a Fellow of the Royal Society of the Arts and the Radio Academy. In 2004, she was awarded the OBE for services to broadcasting.

Academic offices
Preceded by Ian H. White	Master of Jesus College, Cambridge; 2019 to present	Incumbent
