= Cinema etiquette =

Social norms observed by patrons of a movie theater

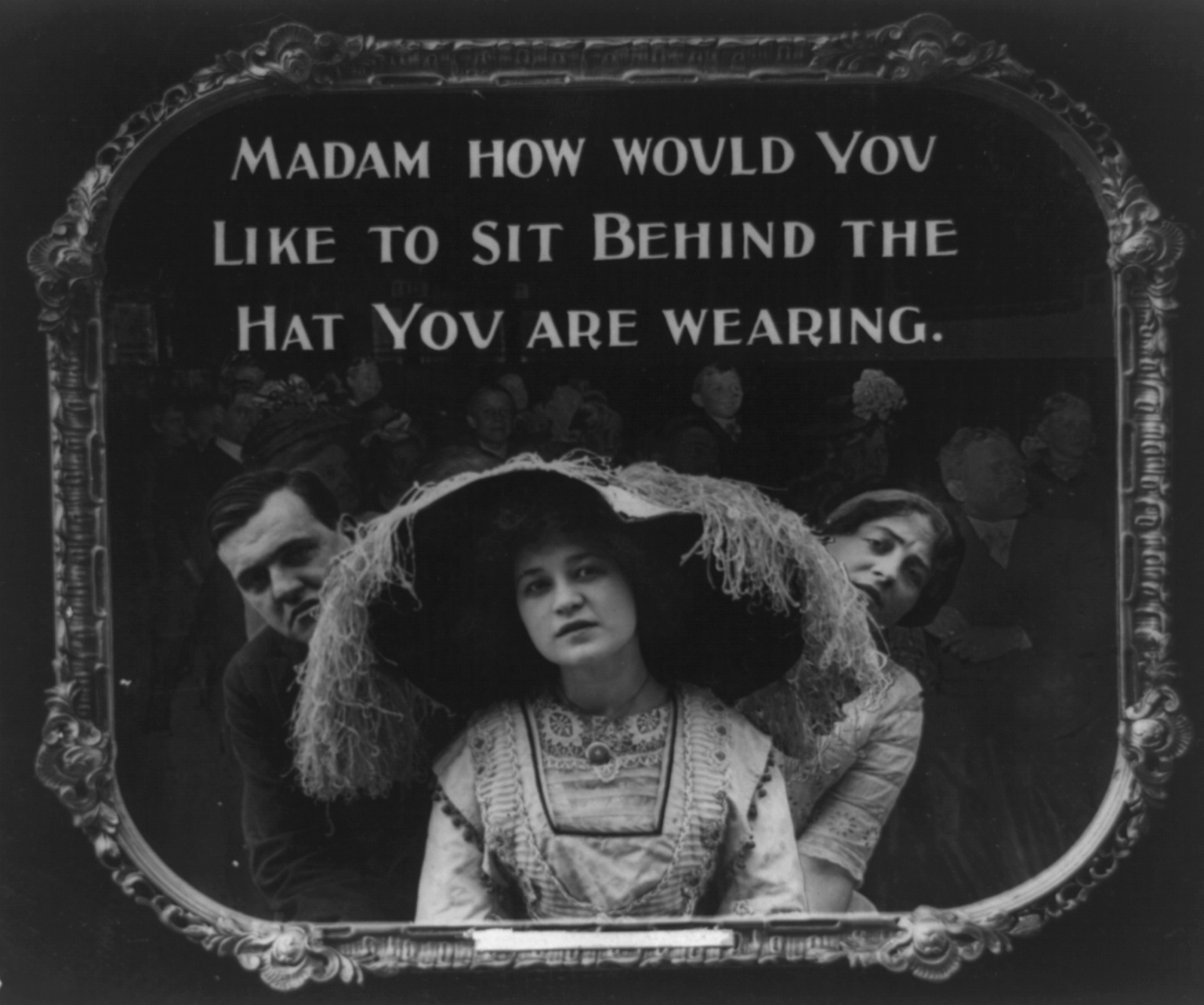
A 1912 silent film title card, asking patrons not to block the view of those behind them

Cinema etiquette is a set of social norms observed by patrons of a movie theater. There are a wide variety of distractions that can hinder other patrons' enjoyment of a film, such as cell phone usage, patrons talking to one another, the rustling of food packaging, the behaviour of children in the audience, and patrons entering and leaving during a screening.

During the era of silent film, recommendations for behaviour were displayed on title cards before a screening, offering advice including "Ladies, kindly remove your hats", "Loud talking or whistling not allowed", and "Please applaud with hands only". Modern cinemas often display a short reminder for patrons to turn off their cell phones, before the film begins.

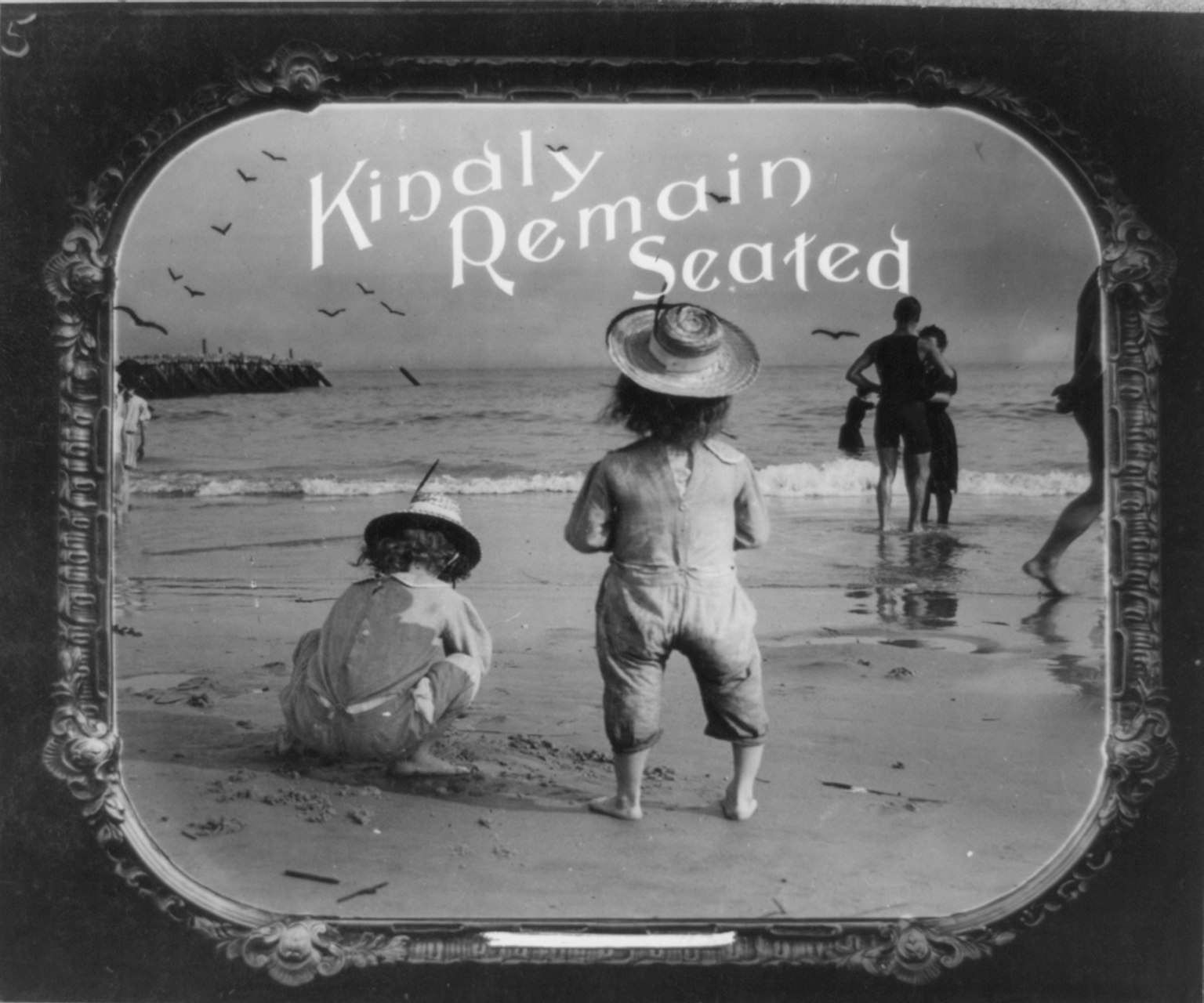
c1912. Framed paper print of a "humorous" motion picture lantern slide announcement.

Etiquette writers Debrett's released a guide to correct cinema behaviour in 2008, after research showed that 66% of moviegoers wanted to see an improvement in cinema etiquette. The most common objections from those polled were having their view blocked by a tall patron in front, or having their own seat kicked from behind. Debrett's five recommendations were to arrive on time, to sit still, to refrain from whispering during the film, to wait for a loud scene before eating wrapped candy, and for couples to restrain from excessive displays of affection.

In 2010, film critics Mark Kermode and Simon Mayo proposed a "Code of Conduct for Moviegoers", suggesting among other things that cinema patrons should refrain from slurping drinks or eating "anything harder than a soft roll with no filling", should not use cell phones even in flight mode, and should neither remove their shoes nor rest their feet on other seats. The Code criticizes "irresponsible" parents who take young children to 12A certificate films they have no interest in seeing, describing it as "using the cinema as a babysitter". Film blog ScreenCrush later compiled a list entitled "Movie Manners: 10 Tips on How Not to Be a Jerk at the Movies". In addition to some of the more obvious suggestions, they advise against spoiling the film for other patrons by discussing it on the way out, and recommend using the restroom prior to the film. A 2012 survey of British cinemagoers found that 66% of respondents could recall objecting to another patron's poor etiquette, but had not objected to it for fear of causing a "scene". 85% of those polled favoured the adoption of an official cinema code of conduct.

To address the need for a code of conduct during film screenings, various theatres and cinemas have proposed special showings in response to patron complaints and requests. Vue Cinemas chain introduced adults-only screenings of films in 2008, noting customer complaints about a "hubbub of noise" from children at afternoon screenings. In 2008, the Picturehouse Cinemas in the United Kingdom experimented with a ban on popcorn, partly in response to requests from patrons. Empire Cinemas promoted its own etiquette guide in 2012, displaying it on posters in auditoriums. The Alamo Drafthouse theatre chain is known for strictly enforcing a strict etiquette code for audiences, and used an irate customer's telephone complaint about being ejected for violating it as part of their marketing.

A modern question of etiquette arose in 2024 when it was questioned whether it was appropriate for patrons to sing along to popular songs in films based upon musicals. A number of cinemas issued warnings to viewers of Wicked not to sing during the screening on the grounds it disrupted the experience for other patrons. In contrast, The Rock, who co-starred in Moana 2, encouraged people to sing along.

== Intimacy ==
Even prior to the invention of motion pictures, the darkened auditoriums of opera houses were associated with physical intimacy between couples, particularly in the expensive private boxes ("loges") in the balcony, which had curtains that could be drawn.

Some couples take advantage of the darkened auditorium of movie theatres to make out, such as kissing and physical intimacy, especially in the back row. Movie theatres have been identified as one of the various locations in which "uncommitted, non-romantic sexual encounters" take place, with other locations being dance clubs, bars and parks. Arm rests pose a hindrance to intimacy. Some theatres have "loveseats", which are seats designed for two, without an armrest in the middle. The most modern theaters have movable armrests throughout the theater that when down can hold a food container as well as act as an armrest or partition between the seats and when up allow closer contact. More expensive theatres may have large comfortable sofas. From an etiquette standpoint, Cinemablend states that a short kiss on the lips is almost always acceptable but to avoid disturbing other movie patrons, kissing should not go beyond ten seconds; as well, couples who wish to kiss should try to sit at the back of the auditorium and choose a sparsely attended film.

== Drive-in theatre etiquette ==
These etiquettes include rules such as moviegoers using parking lights when parking or driving their cars inside the lot, keeping car headlights and brake lights off throughout the film to decrease distraction, having bigger vehicles moved to the back or to the side in order to accommodate for other movie viewers, as well as the prevention of littering.
