= Kermode and Mayo's Film Review =

Radio programme

Kermode and Mayo's Film Review / Kermode and Mayo's Take
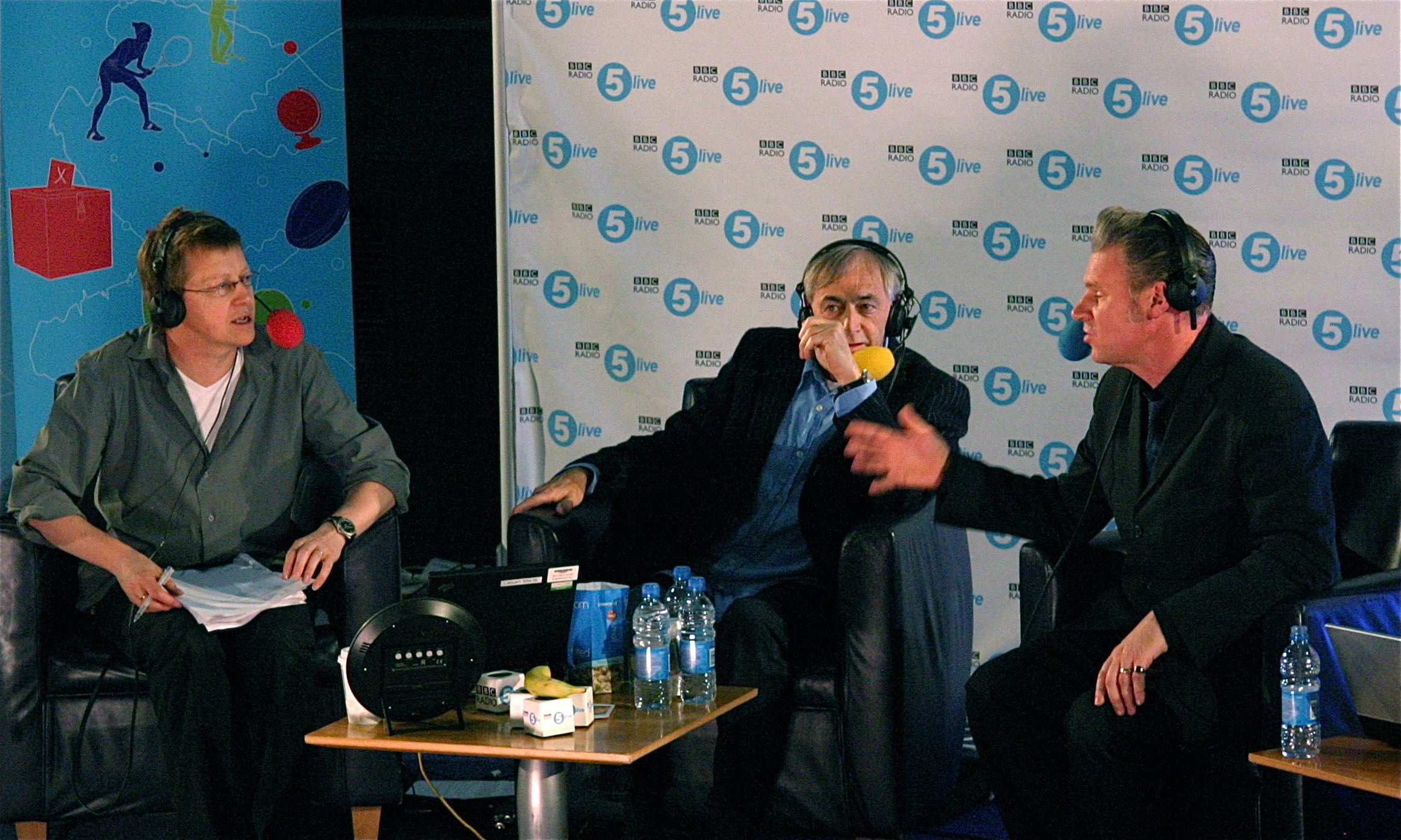
- Mayo (left) and Kermode (right) broadcasting live from Edinburgh in June 2009, with guest Bill Forsyth.
- Other names: Wittertainment
- Running time: 120 minutes
- Country of origin: United Kingdom
- Language: English
- Home station: BBC Radio 5 Live
- Hosted by: Simon Mayo
- Starring: Mark Kermode
- Edited by: Simon Poole (for Somethin' Else)
- Original release: 2001 (on radio); 2005 (as podcast) – 1 April 2022
- Website: Official web page
- Podcast: Official podcast feed

Kermode and Mayo's Film Review was a radio programme with Mark Kermode and Simon Mayo, broadcast on BBC Radio 5 Live on Friday afternoons. The show was self-described as the BBC's "flagship film programme" and featured film reviews from Kermode, interviews with actors and other guests, and listeners' emails. The programme's Twitter handle, "Wittertainment", was a nickname for the programme itself.

The show was broadcast live and accompanied by a live streaming webcam feed; each programme was available on BBC Sounds and as a podcast. Individual reviews were available in an A to Z directory on the 5 Live website, or as videos on YouTube.

As of August 2014 the show was BBC Radio's second-most downloaded podcast, and fourth on the BBC list of most-downloaded shows from 2004 to 2014.

On 11 March 2022, Simon Mayo announced that the programme would end its run on BBC Radio 5 Live, with the final show being broadcast on 1 April 2022. Following the final show, the duo announced on social media that the format would continue on a new twice weekly podcast with Sony Music, Kermode and Mayo's Take.

== History ==
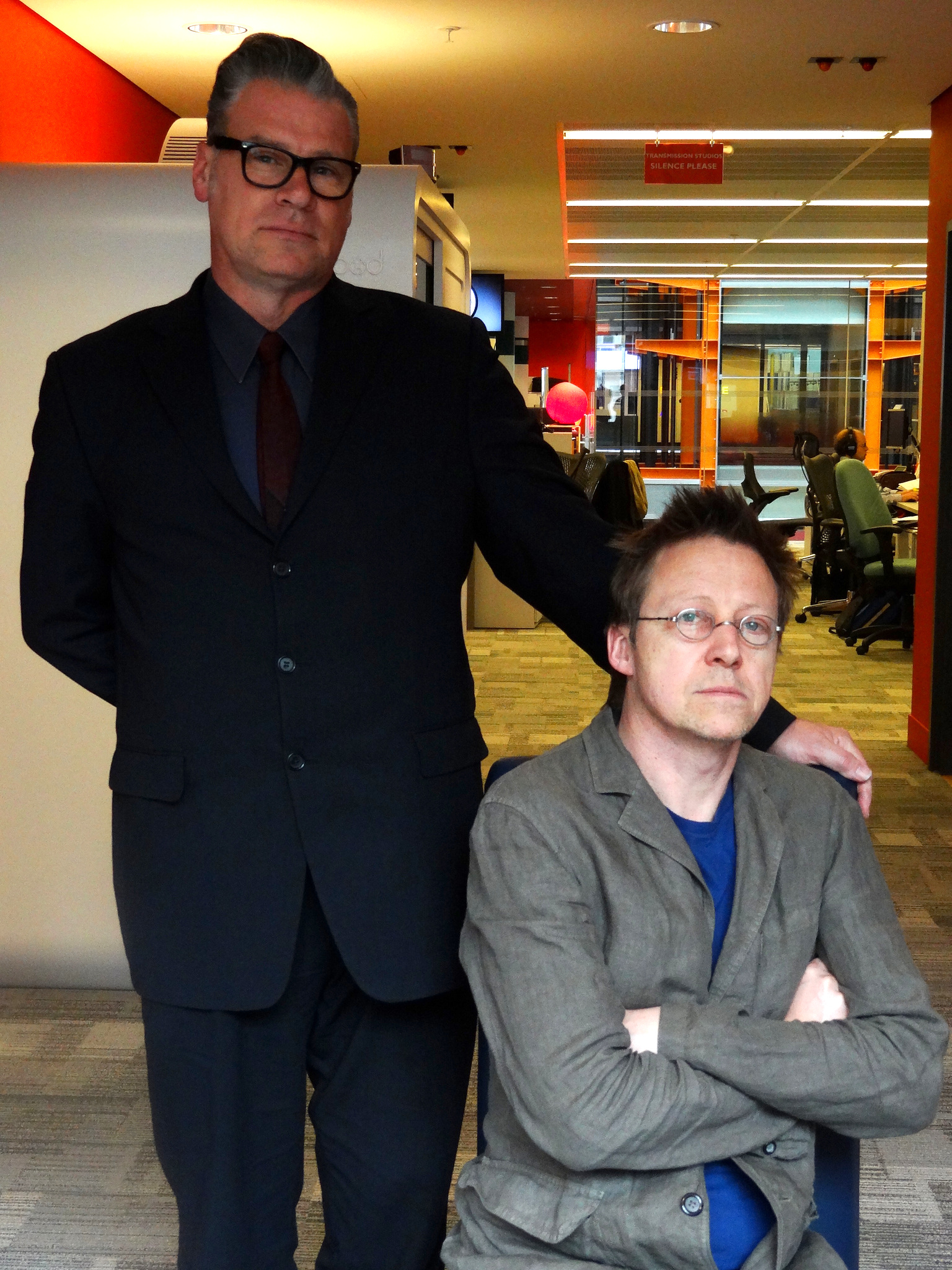
Kermode and Mayo in 2013

Kermode and Mayo first appeared together on BBC Radio 1 in the 1990s. The full programme started on Radio 5 Live in 2001, as a "short review segment" on the Friday episode of Mayo's weekday afternoon show. Upon reuniting on Radio 5 Live, their relationship continued just as it had on Radio 1, with Kermode recalling his first words may have been "another thing".

In 2005, a podcast version of Kermode and Mayo's programme was made available. According to Brett Spencer, who worked for Radio 5 Live at the time, it was downloaded 42 times in the first week.

In 2009 the show received a Sony Radio Academy Award.

When Mayo started presenting BBC Radio 2's weekday drivetime programme, the movie reviews were kept on 5 Live, and expanded to two hours to become a show in its own right from 14:00 every Friday. In June 2011, it was announced that BBC had signed a two-year agreement for the programme to be produced by Somethin' Else Sound Directions; the company was selected following a competitive process that also included pitches from Hidden Flack, the talent management and production company whose clients include Kermode and Nigel Floyd The change after ten years was part of an effort by the BBC to have more of its radio shows produced from outside production companies. The change became effective 7 October 2011; as of that date Simon Poole was the show's producer, Robin Bulloch was its editor, and Rowan Woods was the guest booker. As of July 2019, Simon Poole was the show's editor. Somethin' Else announced its intention to "'build the profile of the Kermode and Mayo brand online' with more podcast downloads and a 'new digital strategy'."

As of March 2014, the programme had an average audience of 585,000 listeners, with a further 241,000 people listening to the podcast and 230,000 watching the programme's YouTube channel.

For the month of August 2014 the podcast was downloaded 1.6 million times, a monthly BBC Radio milestone exceeded only by The Archers. As of October 2014 the show was fourth on the BBC list of most-downloaded shows of the past decade, with 50.6 million.

=== Kermode and Mayo's Take ===
On 11 March 2022, Kermode and Mayo announced that the show would be coming to an end on 5 Live, saying "21 years is a long time to be clogging up the schedules. We - and no one else - have decided to step away". Their last edition aired on 1 April with Mayo leaving the BBC after 40 years. Immediately after coming off air, their new podcast Kermode and Mayo's Take was announced by Somethin' Else (now part of Sony Music Entertainment's Global Podcast Division). This replacement review show, launched in May 2022, includes discussions about television series as well as films, with the Take 2 version of the podcast being exclusive to subscribers.

== Format ==
The first hour of the show normally began with a run-down of the week's top ten films, with brief comments or capsule reviews from Kermode for films he had seen; Mayo read comments and reviews from listeners on all of the films. The rest of the first hour featured live or pre-recorded interviews with guests, usually actors or directors promoting an upcoming release. The second hour was devoted to full reviews of recently released films. A number of different additional features were included throughout the 21 years of the show's history, with WTF (What's That Film), where Kermode tries to name a half-remembered film, being the last weekly regular feature of this kind on the show.

Towards the end of the programme Kermode identified the "best film to watch that week" on British free-to-air television channels and 'TV Movie So Bad it's Bad'. In the 2010s, Kermode noticed that the quality of some of the films broadcast by the channel 5Star had been "substandard" with many titles due to be broadcast on the channel picking up that week's 'TV Movie So Bad it's Bad' award. The final film picked for this feature was Grown Ups, an Adam Sandler film which was due to be broadcast at 5:10pm on 2 April 2022 on 5Star. At the end of each show Kermode identified his "Film of the Week" from the ones reviewed that week. In February 2012, a new "DVD of the week" feature started, with Kermode identifying noteworthy DVD releases during the programme.

Throughout each show Kermode and Mayo engaged in "on-air sparring" that was compared to a "bickering married couple"; the decade-long partnership included numerous in-jokes and ongoing arguments. Kermode's negative reviews are referred to by the presenters and fans as "Kermodean rants".

=== Regular guests ===
Various actors made multiple appearances on the show, particularly Jason Isaacs, Michael Sheen and David Morrissey, and were referred to as Friends of the Show. During each programme, a number of these friends were greeted in a list, beginning 'And hello to...'. Jason Isaacs is always the first on the list, having been a school friend of Kermode, but other people named in the past include Michael Sheen, David Morrissey, Stephen Fry and various English folk groups. When searching for "Jason Isaacs" on Google UK the phrase "Hello to Jason Isaacs" appears before the search results. The phrase has also made an appearance on The Jay Leno Show, having been inserted into various on-screen graphics, whilst Isaacs was a guest on the podcast version of the final episode, added to BBC Sounds on 1 April 2022.

=== Stand-in presenters ===
Alternative presenters when Kermode and Mayo were away: the most regular replacements for Kermode were former Radio 1 critic James King, and Boyd Hilton (television and review editor of Heat magazine) and Nigel Floyd (film critic for Time Out magazine), commonly referred to as Boyd & Floyd. Later stand-in reviewers included Daily Telegraph film critic Robbie Collin, Radio Times film editor Andrew Collins, Independent contributor Clarisse Loughrey and film programmer and writer Anna Bogutskaya. Replacements for Mayo have included Al Murray, Colin Paterson, Zoe Ball, David Morrissey, Jo Whiley, Colin Murray, Edith Bowman, Richard Bacon, Ben Bailey Smith and Sanjeev Bhaskar.

=== Special broadcasts ===
Alongside the regular show there were a number of special broadcasts. These included an annual 'Review of the Year' show, pre-recorded and broadcast on New Year's Eve, during which Kermode named his best and worst films of the year, a Christmas Quiz, broadcast on Christmas Eve with special guests and recorded with a live audience, and occasional outside broadcasts (for example, from the Phoenix Cinema in East Finchley, a 2009 broadcast from the Edinburgh International Film Festival, or during sporting events when Mayo's show comes from the location of the event).

On its 10th anniversary, the show was broadcast from the new BBC MediaCityUK in Salford, featuring film music played by the BBC Philharmonic. As part of the performance of the score from Midnight Cowboy, Kermode played the harmonica solo with the orchestra after volunteering at the roundtable discussion, not realising the part required the chromatic harmonica rather than the diatonic harmonica, the instrument he plays. After the broadcast on Radio 5 finished, there was more discussion and music on sister station BBC Radio 3 later that evening. The music for the broadcast was chosen by guests for a special roundtable discussion, released as a bonus podcast, except for one decision (between the music for Jaws and Indiana Jones) which was opened to the public for a text vote with the winner (Indiana Jones) being announced on Friday 27 May. The guests for the roundtable discussion were Andrew Collins, Paloma Faith, Richard Wigley and Robert Ziegler.

Other 10th Anniversary extras, during a month of special programming (in May and June 2011), include a 'Best of', broadcast on 29 May 2011, presented by Hugh Bonneville, an appearance on the Richard Bacon show on 31 May 2011 discussing the beginning of the partnership and four online videos.

=== Cinema code of conduct ===
In 2010, Kermode and Mayo developed a Cinema Code of Conduct, which was presented as a guide to cinema-goers as to the best way to behave while watching a film. During the development of the Code, listeners were invited to submit suggestions for what should be included.

The Cinema Code of Conduct consists of the following rules:

- No Eating anything harder than a soft roll
- No Slurping
- No Rustling
- No Irresponsible Parenting
- No Hobbies
- No Talking
- No Mobile Phone Usage
- No Kicking of Seats
- No Arriving Late
- No Shoe Removal (except where culturally appropriate, such as in Japan)

== Related productions ==
Kermode and Mayo have also appeared on The Culture Show with a segment called 'The Screening Room', held in various locations, where films were discussed with an audience before clips of those films were shown. Kermode also had a video blog on the BBC website, called 'Kermode Uncut', where he invited discussion from viewers and often continued or began discussions which related back to the radio show. The blog came to an end in December 2018.

During his review of Percy Jackson and the Lightning Thief, Kermode made a passing comment that it was so similar to the Harry Potter franchise it might as well be called 'Benjamin Sniddlegrass and the Cauldron of Penguins'. Listener Jeremy Dylan then took this title and produced posters, a trailer and, eventually, an independent film based on the concept, with Stephen Fry as narrator. Following the basic structure of the Harry Potter books, where the main character discovers special abilities and goes to a special school, the script contains a multitude of references to Wittertainment jokes and themes.

In 2015, Kermode and Mayo co-authored a book called The Movie Doctors, published by Canongate Books. The title is a reference to a joke on the radio show regarding Mark Kermode being a 'real' Doctor, having been awarded a PhD from the University of Manchester in 1991, while Simon Mayo is a 'fake' doctor, having become Doctor of Letters after receiving an honorary degree from the University of Warwick in 2005.

In April 2020, the BBC commissioned a six-part television show titled Kermode and Mayo's Home Entertainment Service to be broadcast on BBC Four to cover film and television available to stream during the COVID-19 pandemic.

== Awards ==
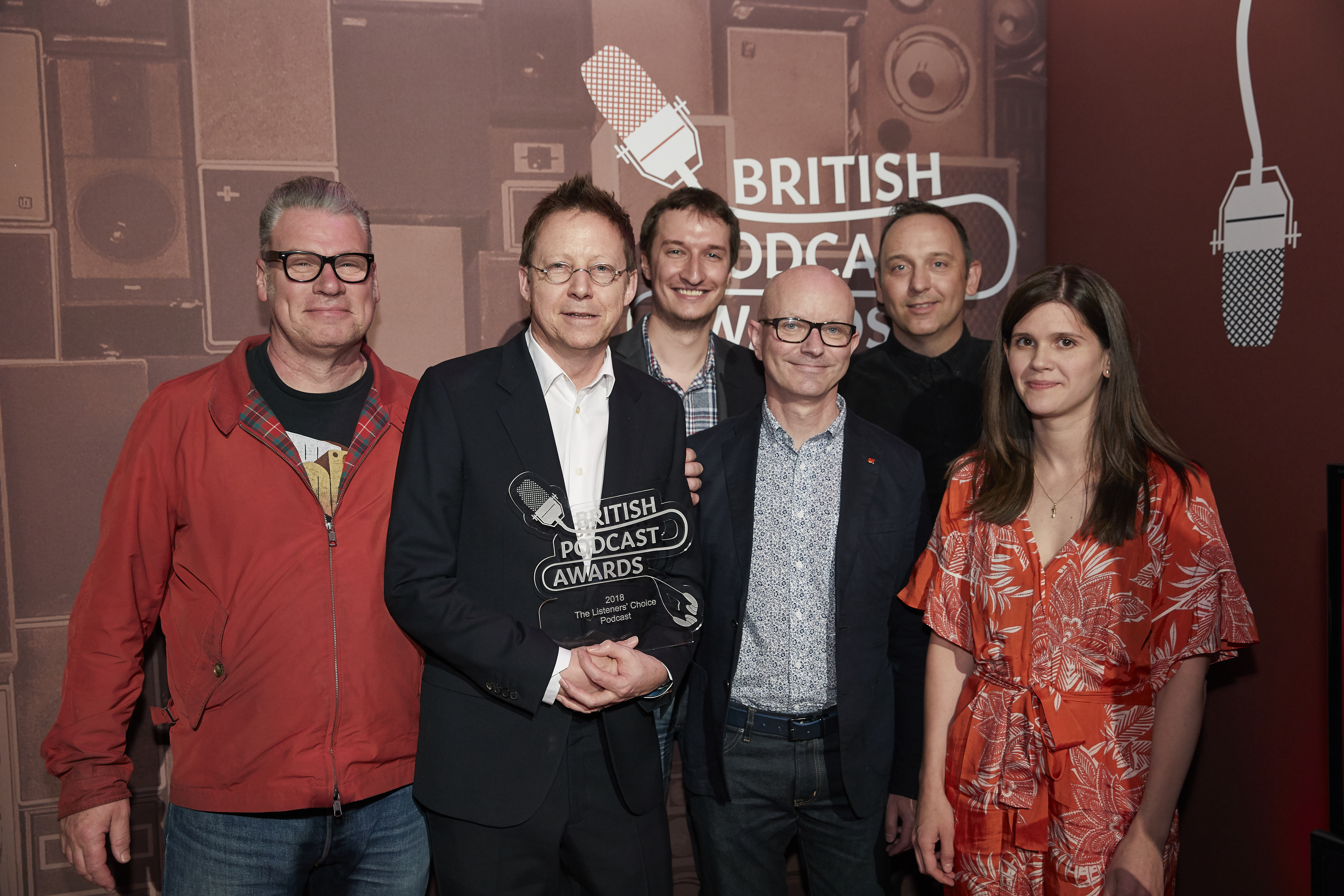
The Kermode and Mayo's Film Reviews team with the Listeners' Choice Award at the 2018 British Podcast Awards

- Gold Speech award, Sony Awards 2009
- Best Specialist Contributor, Mark Kermode, Sony Awards 2010
- Listener's Choice Award, British Podcast Awards 2017
- Listener's Choice Award, British Podcast Awards 2018

== See also ==
- List of film and television podcasts
