= Mango Protocol =

Spanish video game company

- Industry: Adventure games
- Founded: Spain 2013
- Headquarters: Barcelona, Spain
- Website: www.mangoprotocol.com

Mango Protocol is an independent developer and publisher of games from Barcelona, Spain. They are well known for their so-called "Psychotic Adventures" with the games MechaNika and Agatha Knife, amongst others.

== History ==
Mango Protocol was founded by Mariona Valls Porta and Javier Gálvez Guerrero in 2013. Valls graduated at the University of Barcelona with a degree in fine arts and Gálvez graduated in telecom engineering and video game development. In the end of 2013, they joined forces to create their own stories through video games. Valls takes care of all the visual aspects of game creation, while Gálvez is in charge of the design and programming tasks.

Together with Jordi Garcia Cuesta, they created two prototype games for the Global Game Jam. In 2014, they created Causeffect and in 2015 Magnet Arena. For their first commercial game, MechaNika, Guillem Vilamala Serrano contributed music to the game, while Adam Giles Levy translated it from Spanish into English. The game was released on July 16, 2015 and was later translated into French, German and Russian.

In October 2015, Jordi Garcia Cuesta officially joined the team to help with game design. One year later, in October 2016, the team expanded to include Èric Verdalet Arnó as a programmer and Carmen Vidal González as an animator. Their second game Agatha Knife is a prequel of their first game and was released on 27 April 2017.

== Games ==
- 2015: MechaNika
- 2017: Agatha Knife
- 2020: Colossus Down
- 2024: CLeM

== Awards ==
In 2015, MechaNika won the Best Mobile Game prize in the Three Headed Monkey Awards, a video game contest aimed to give visibility to student projects and new independent studios. It was also nominated for Indie Burger Developer Award 2016 in the category "We want a sequel" as well for the 8th Spanish Video Games Industry Awards.
