= MWC Barcelona =

Mobile industry exhibition

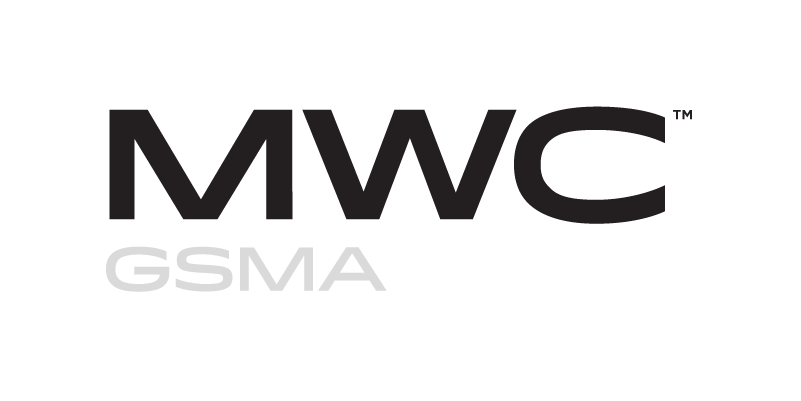

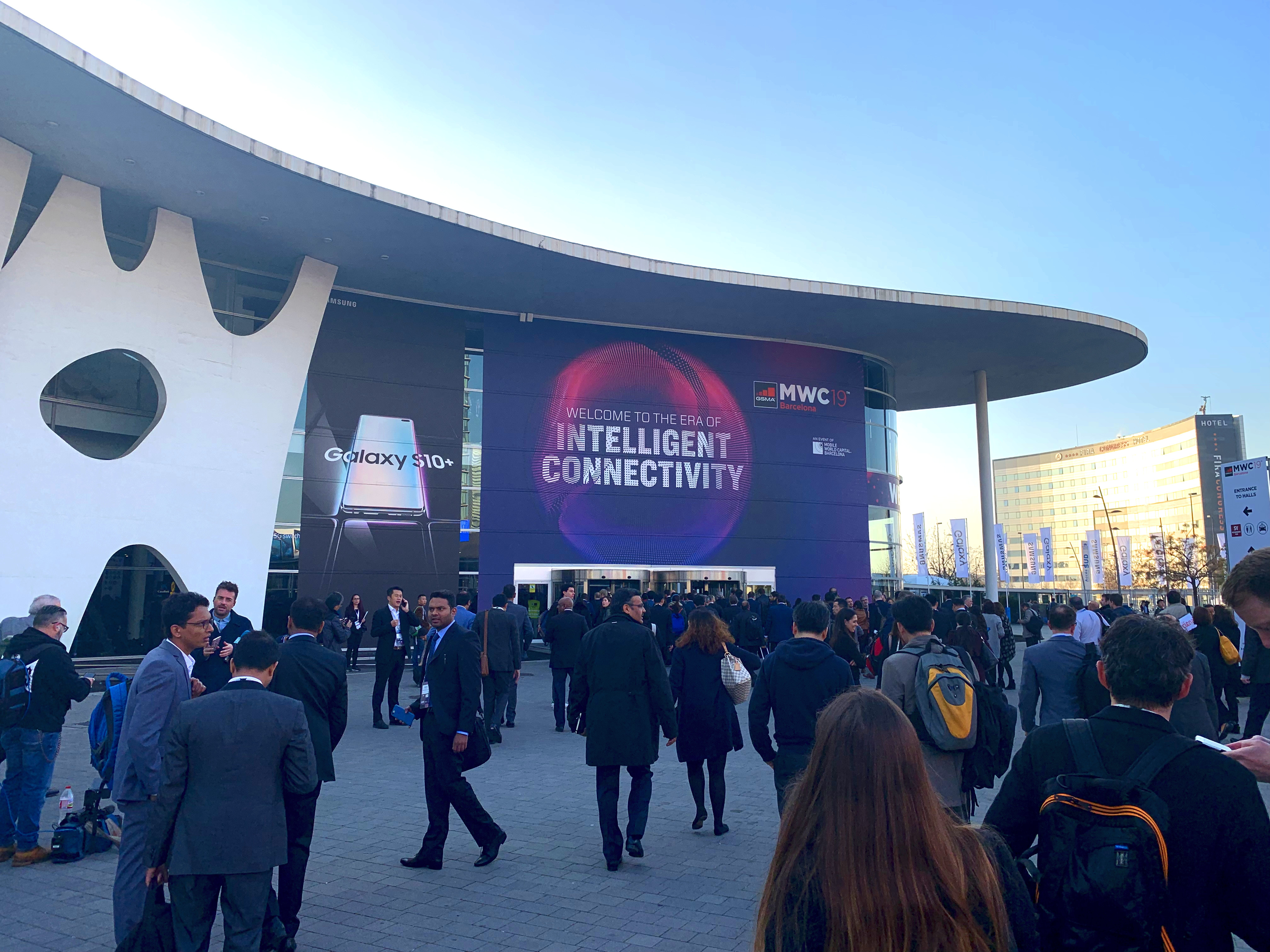
- Entrance of MWC Barcelona 2019
- Status: Active
- Genre: Mobile communications
- Date: 1 March – 4 March 2027
- Venue: Fira de Barcelona Gran Via
- Locations: L'Hospitalet de Llobregat, Barcelona
- Country: Spain
- Inaugurated: 1987; 39 years ago (as GSM World Congress)
- Attendance: 105,000 (2026); 109,500 (2019 & 2025)
- Organiser: GSMA
- Website: www.mwcbarcelona.com

MWC Barcelona, formerly known as the Mobile World Congress, is an annual trade show intended for the mobile communications industry. It is held every February or early March at Fira de Barcelona in L'Hospitalet de Llobregat, Barcelona, Catalonia, Spain.

The event is attended primarily by device manufacturers, network equipment providers, representatives of wireless carriers, and the press, among others. At the 2024 Mobile World Congress, Lenovo unveiled a concept for what it describes as the world's first transparent laptop. The 2026 edition (2–5 March), marking 20 years in Barcelona, drew approximately 105,000 attendees. In June 2022 the GSMA announced that Barcelona would remain the host city through at least 2030. The next edition is scheduled for 1–4 March 2027. The 2026 edition (2–5 March), marking 20 years in Barcelona, drew approximately 105,000 attendees. In June 2022 the GSMA announced that Barcelona would remain the host city through at least 2030. The next edition is scheduled for 1–4 March 2027.

The event is organised by the GSM Association (GSMA). GSMA has extended the MWC brand to four other trade shows in Shanghai, China (MWC Shanghai), Kigali, Rwanda (MWC Kigali, formerly MWC Africa) Las Vegas, United States (MWC Las Vegas, formerly MWC Los Angeles), and Doha, Qatar (MWC Doha) but the brand remains most synonymous with the Barcelona event.

== History ==
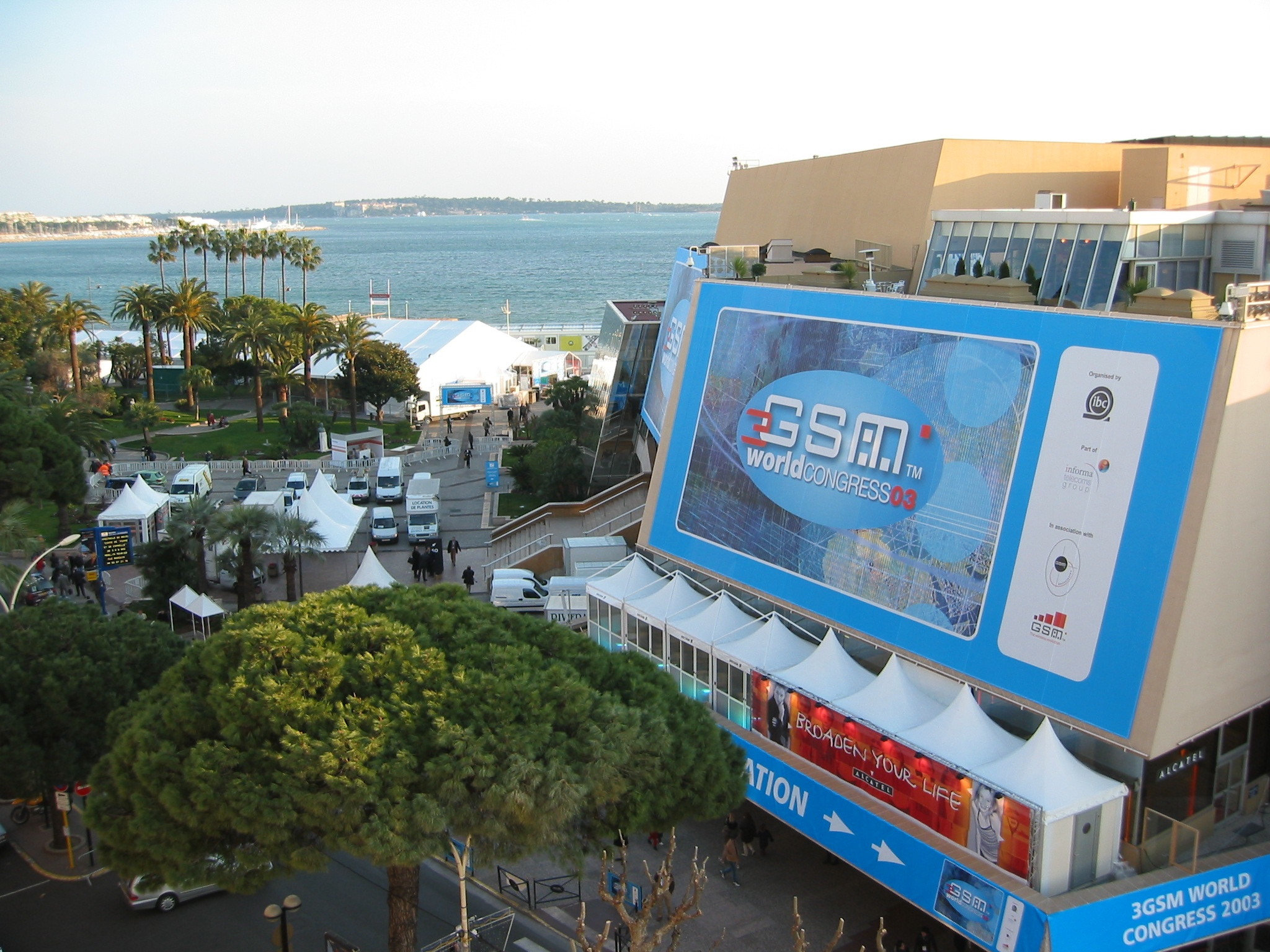
3GSM World Congress 2003 in Cannes, France

The name of the event has evolved over the years. The event's origin traces back to a business conference on "Pan Europe Digital Cellular Radio" (the original working name of the GSM mobile system) held in Brussels in 1987.

The name "GSM World Congress" was first used in 1990 when the event was held in Rome. For the next few years, the event moved to a new city each time, passing through Nice, Berlin, Lisbon, Athens, and Madrid, before setting in 1996 in Cannes. The event was held in Cannes for ten consecutive years, with the name evolving to 3GSM World Congress from 2003.

In 2006, the event moved to Barcelona, held at the Fira de Barcelona Montjuïc. In 2008 the GSM Association, which had been formed in 1996 and had taken an increasing interest in the event, completed the purchase of the show with the name changing to Mobile World Congress for the first time. The GSMA endorsed the International Mobile Gaming Awards in 2008, which were held at the event from then until 2012. In 2011, GSMA announced a long-term deal to continue hosting the event in Barcelona through 2023.

Starting in 2013, Mobile World Congress has been held at the Fira de Barcelona Gran Via.

In February 2020, a large number of vendors announced plans to withdraw from the then-upcoming show, tentatively scheduled for 24–27 February, due to concerns over the COVID-19 pandemic (magnified by the strong Chinese presence in the telecom industry). This included major vendors and operators such as Deutsche Telekom, Ericsson, Intel, LG, Nokia, STMicroelectronics, Vivo, and Vodafone. On 11 February 2020, it was reported that GSMA was considering cancelling the event entirely; health measures were already to be instituted, including a requirement for Chinese attendees to undergo a two-week quarantine prior to the event, as well as body temperature checks of attendees. Chinese vendor Huawei, as well as Samsung, announced plans to remain with a reduced presence, with Huawei primarily sending its European executives only. On 12 February 2020, GSMA CEO John Hoffman announced that MWC 2020 had been cancelled, stating that the event had become "impossible" to host under these conditions.

In April 2020, it was announced that Barcelona will continue hosting the event until 2024 as a consequence of cancellation of MWC 2020.

On 23 September 2020, due to the potential of COVID-19 to affect the 2021 event, the GSMA announced that it would postpone the Mobile World Congress Barcelona to the last week of June.

On 17 March 2021, GSMA stated the 2021 edition would still proceed with a controlled maximum number of 50,000 attendees. At least 10 large exhibitors announced their withdrawal, including Ericsson, Nokia, Facebook, Sony and Cisco. BT was the first Tier 1 telco to announce their withdrawal.

In 2022, from 28 February to 3 March, the Mobile World Congress took place. The mobile technology convention anticipated over 1,800 attendees and exhibitors from 183 countries. All participants were required to have a PCR test or vaccination certificate to take part in congress. At the 2023 Mobile World Congress, companies including Huawei and Qualcomm discussed the future of 5G-Advanced, or 5.5G, technology.

At the 2024 Mobile World Congress, Lenovo unveiled a concept for what it describes as the world's first transparent laptop.

== International editions ==
In 2015, GSMA's Mobile Asia Expo was renamed Mobile World Congress Shanghai.

In 2016, CTIA announced a partnership with GSMA to replace its annual Super Mobility trade show for the U.S. wireless industry with Mobile World Congress Americas, beginning 2017. The event was first held in San Francisco, before moving to Los Angeles for 2018.

== Gallery ==
MWC 2009, held in Fira de Barcelona Montjuïc

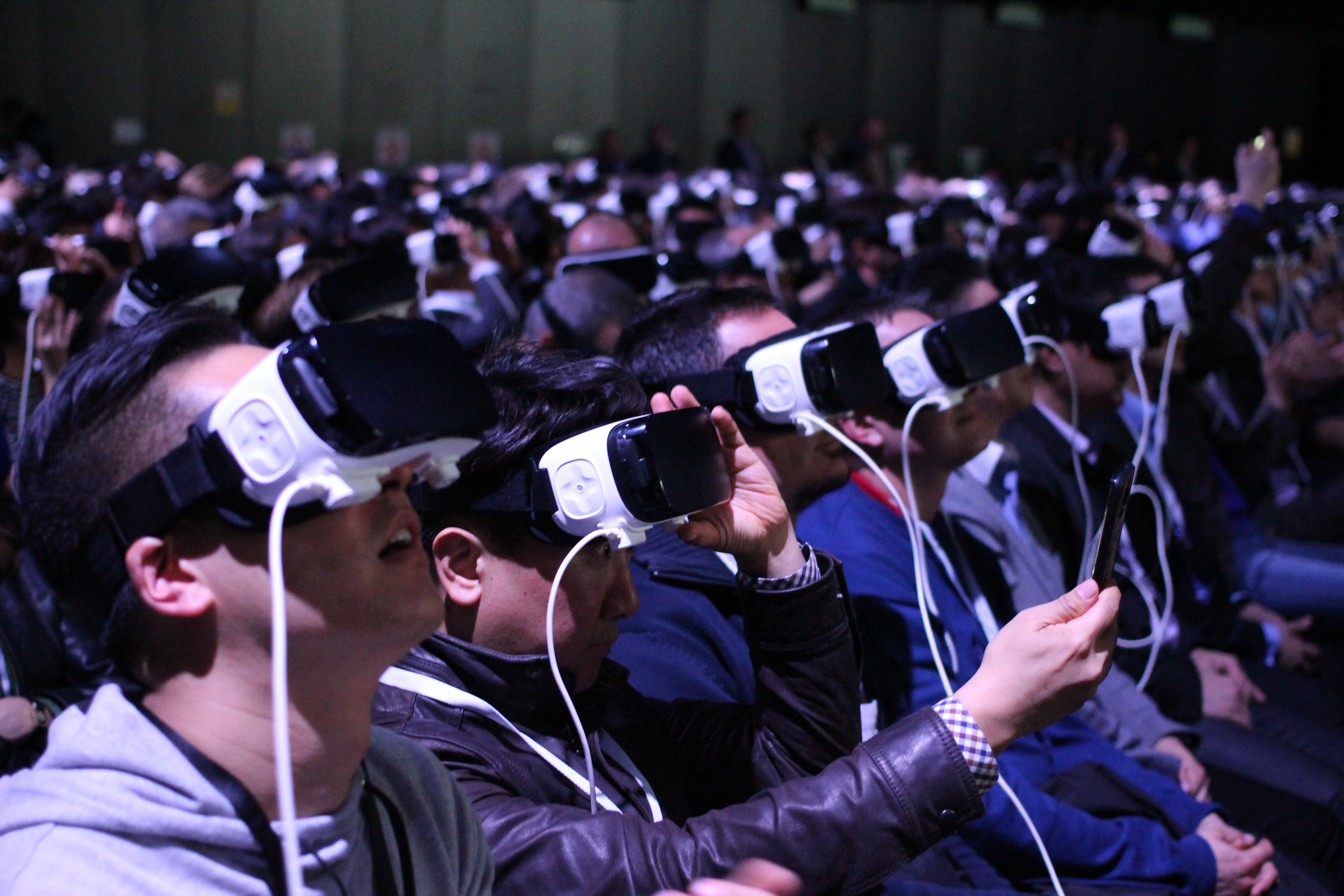
Samsung Gear VR during MWC 2016

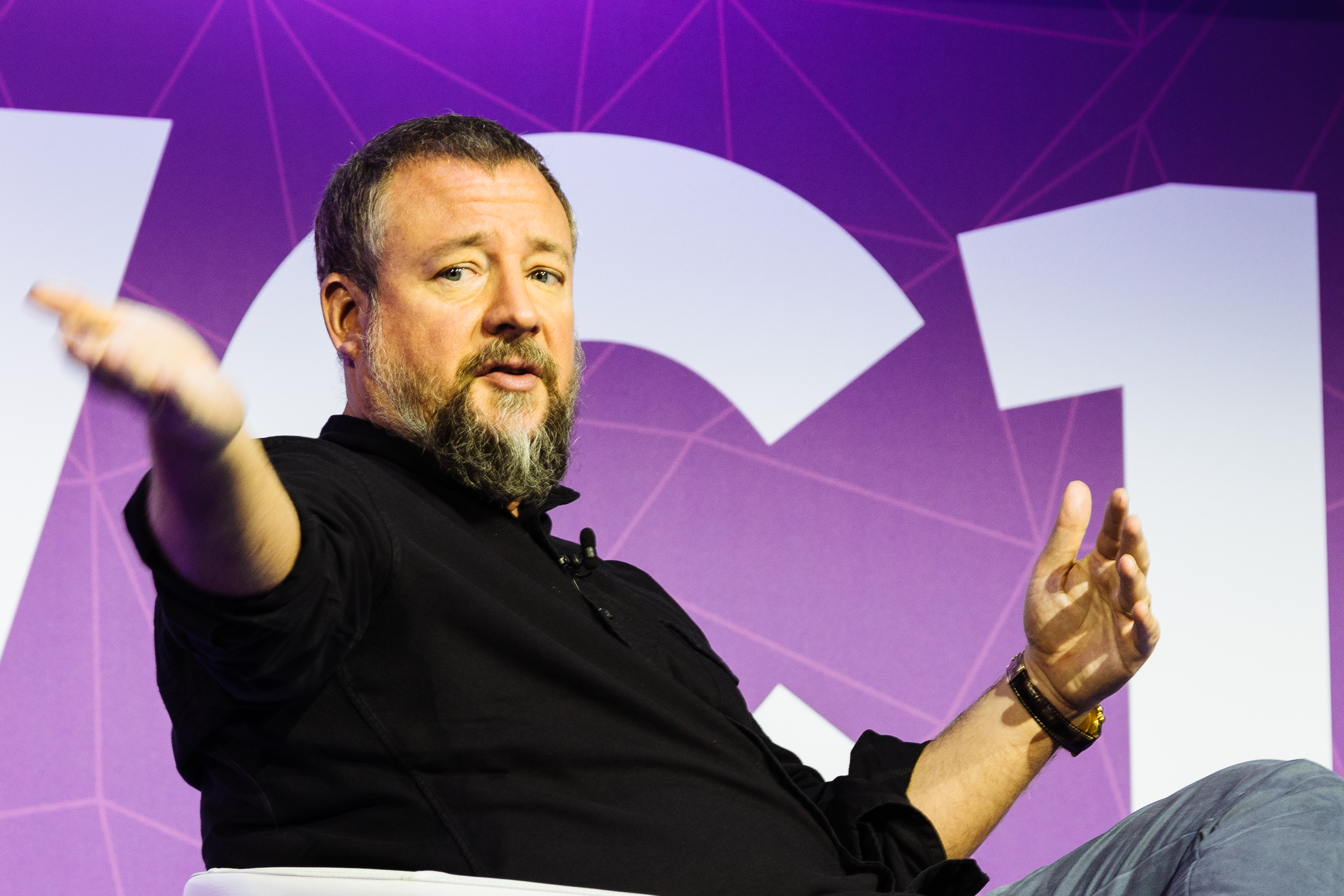
Shane Smith of Vice Media during MWC 2017

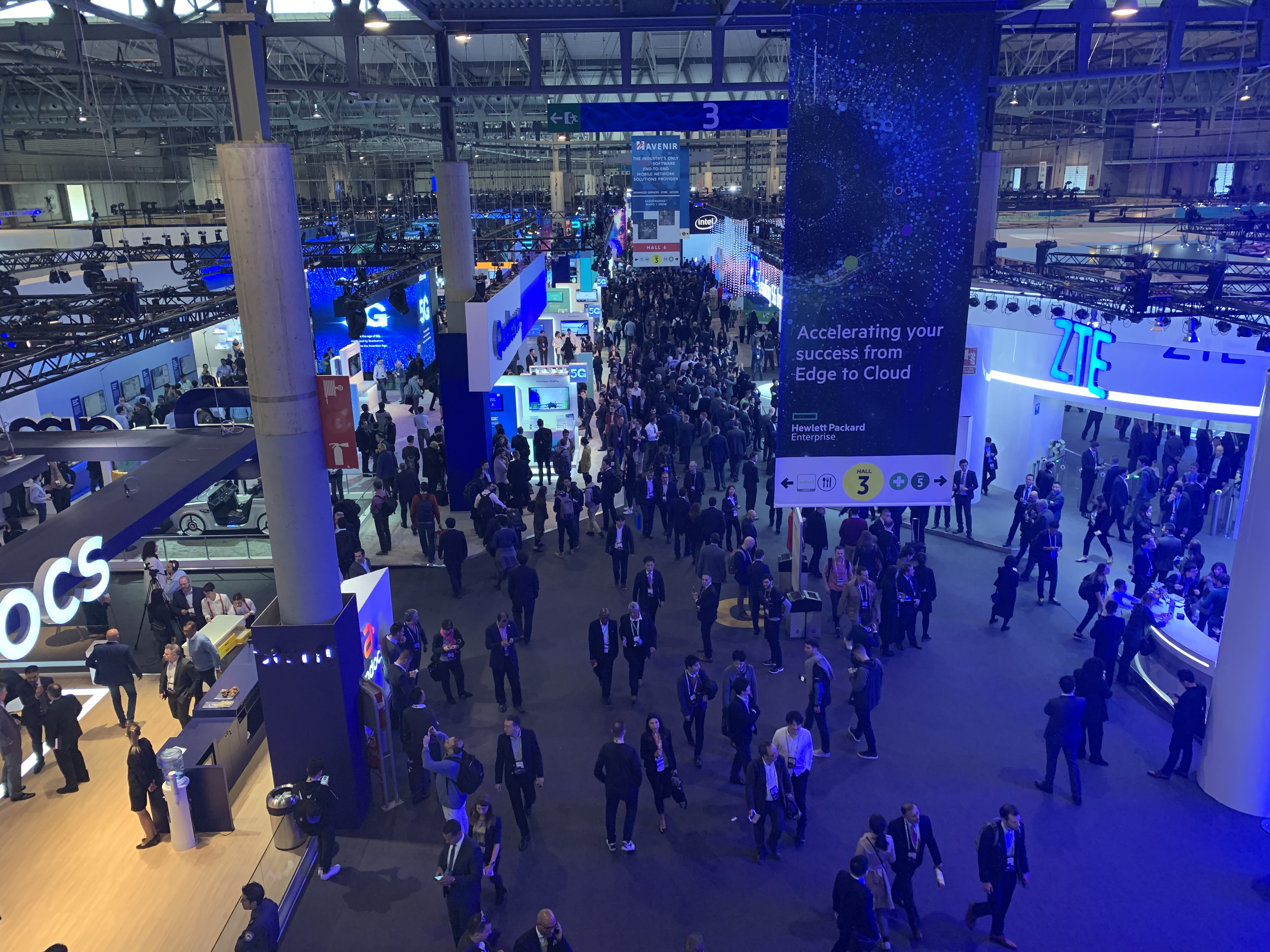
Exhibition floor of MWC 2019

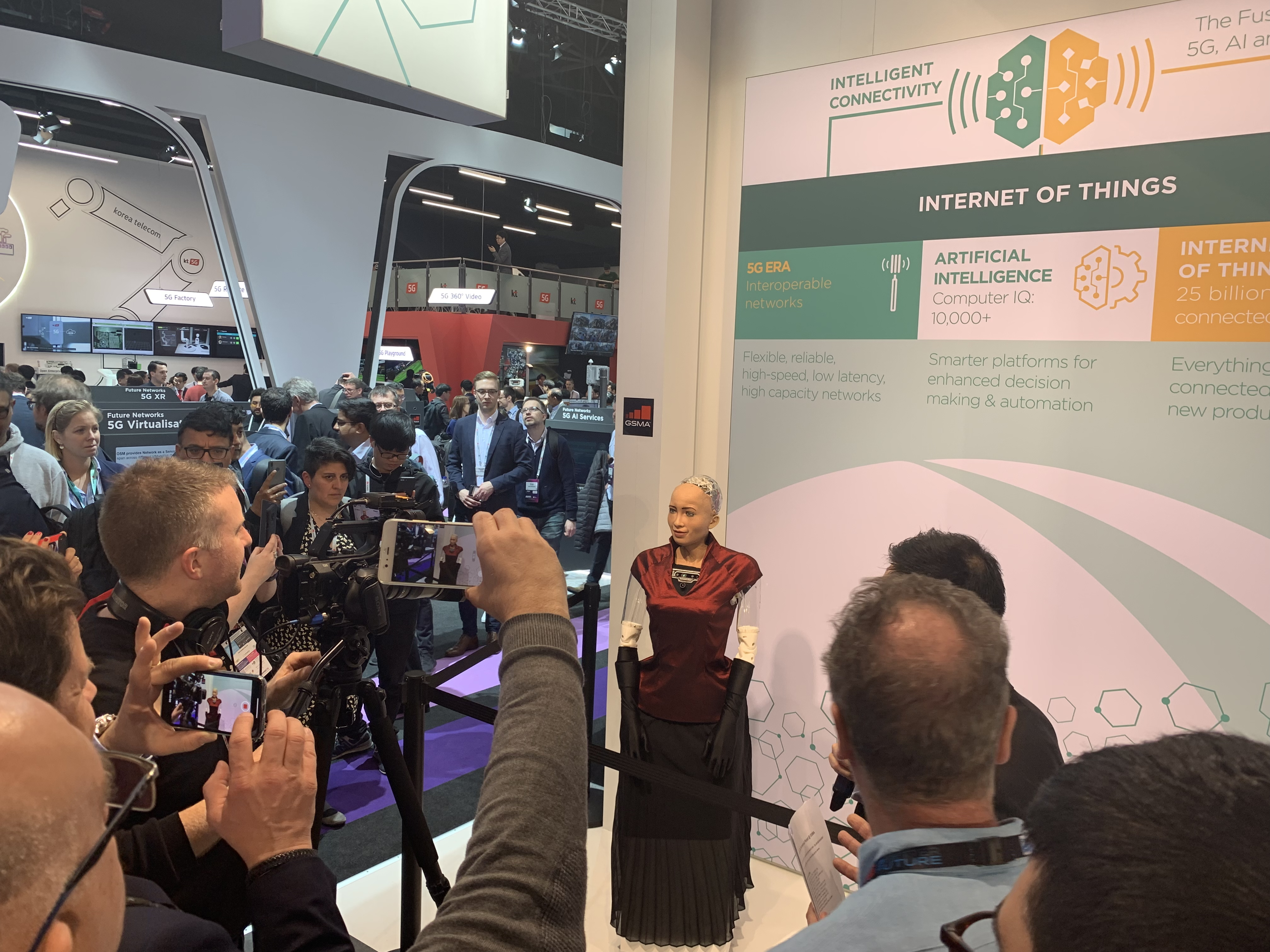
Demonstration of a female humanoid during MWC 2019

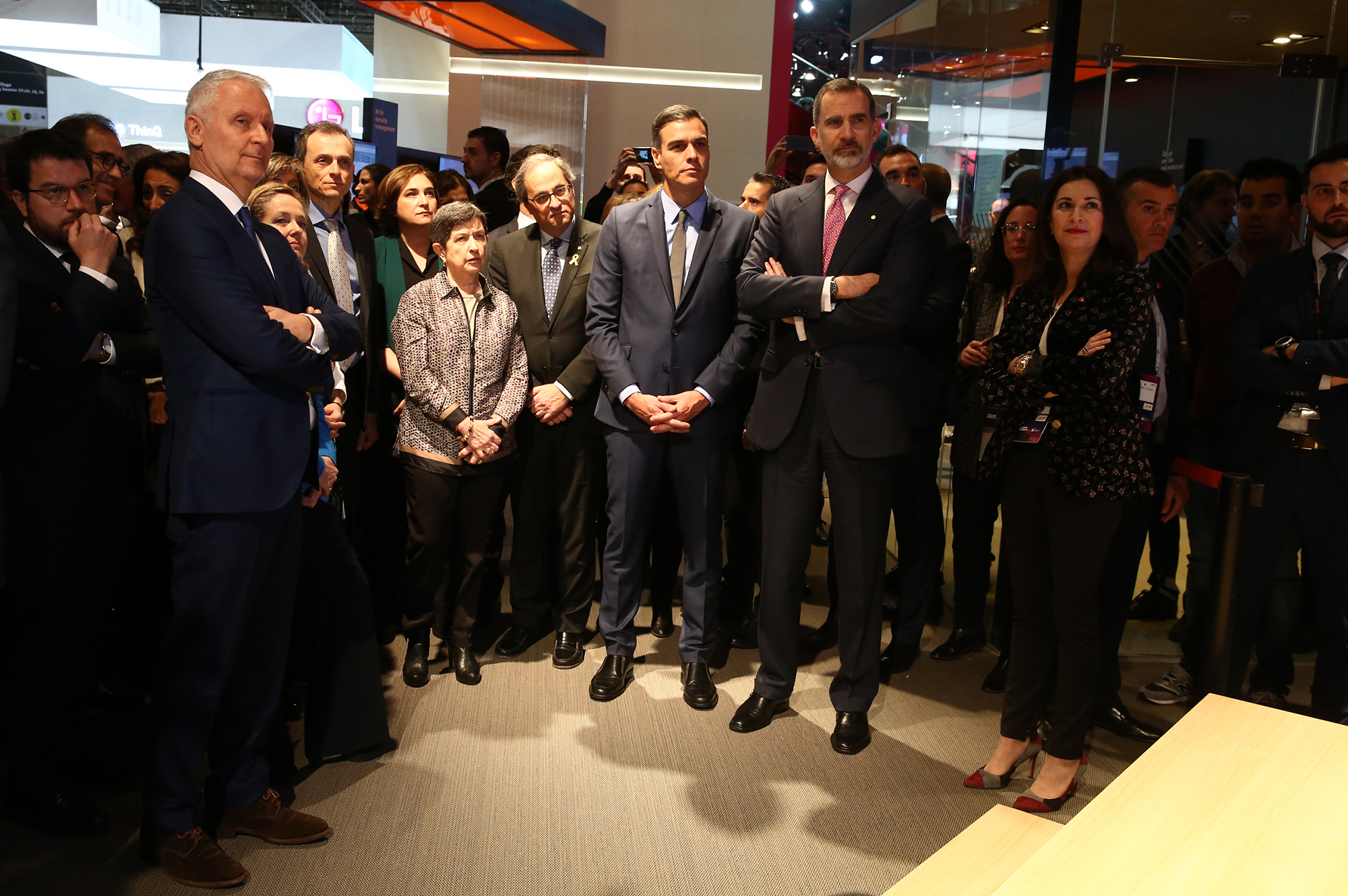
Opening of MWC 2019

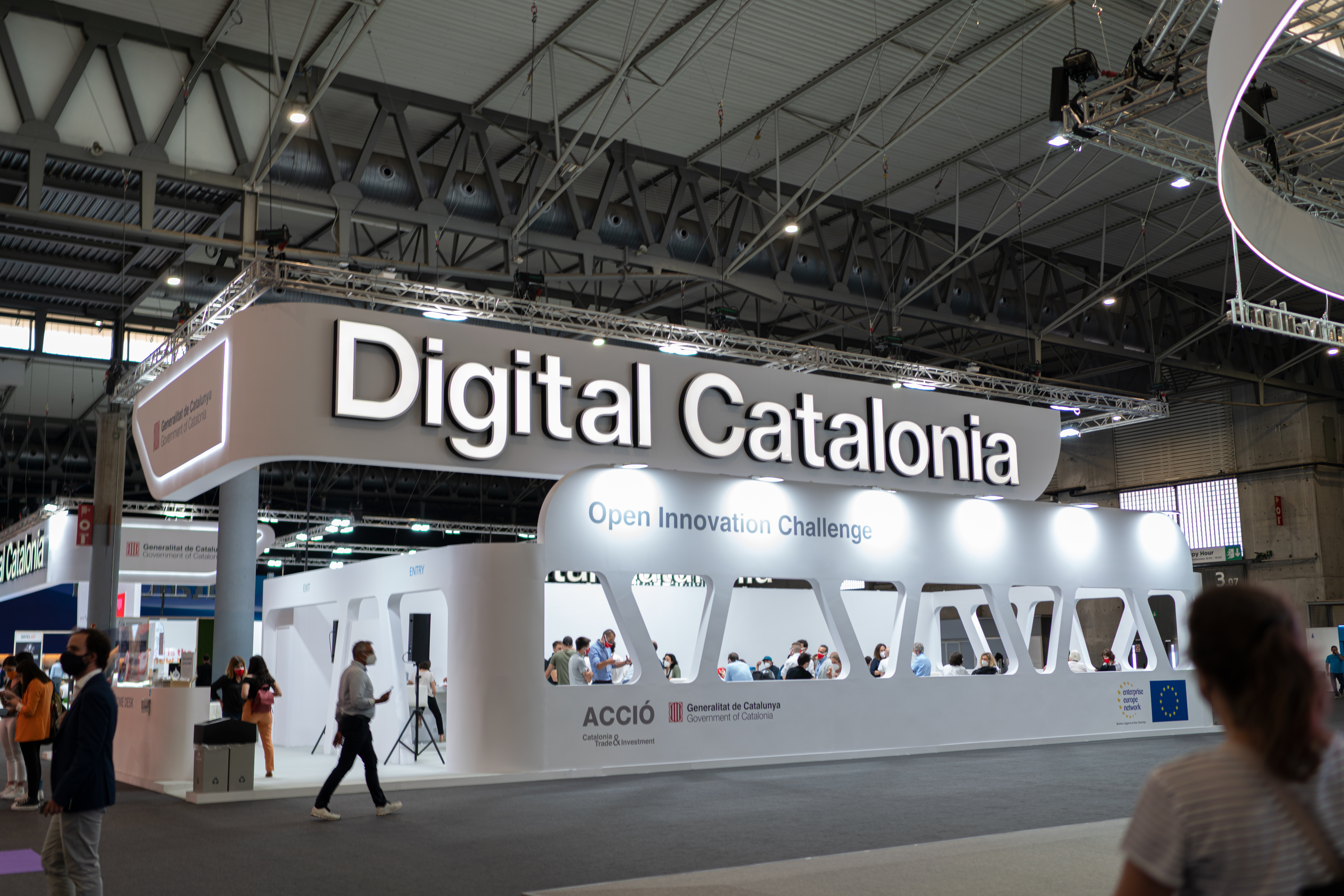
MWC 2021

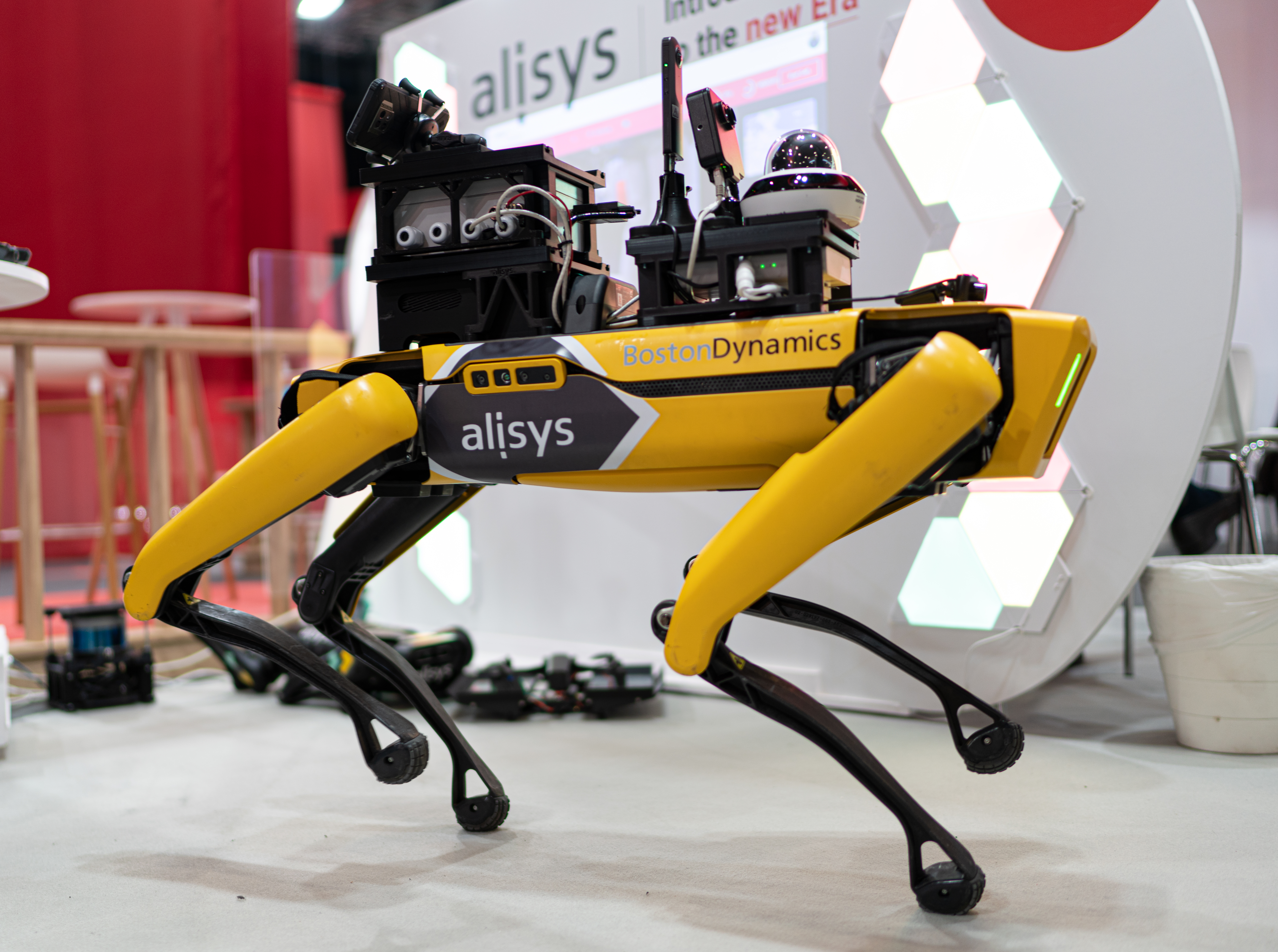
MWC 2021

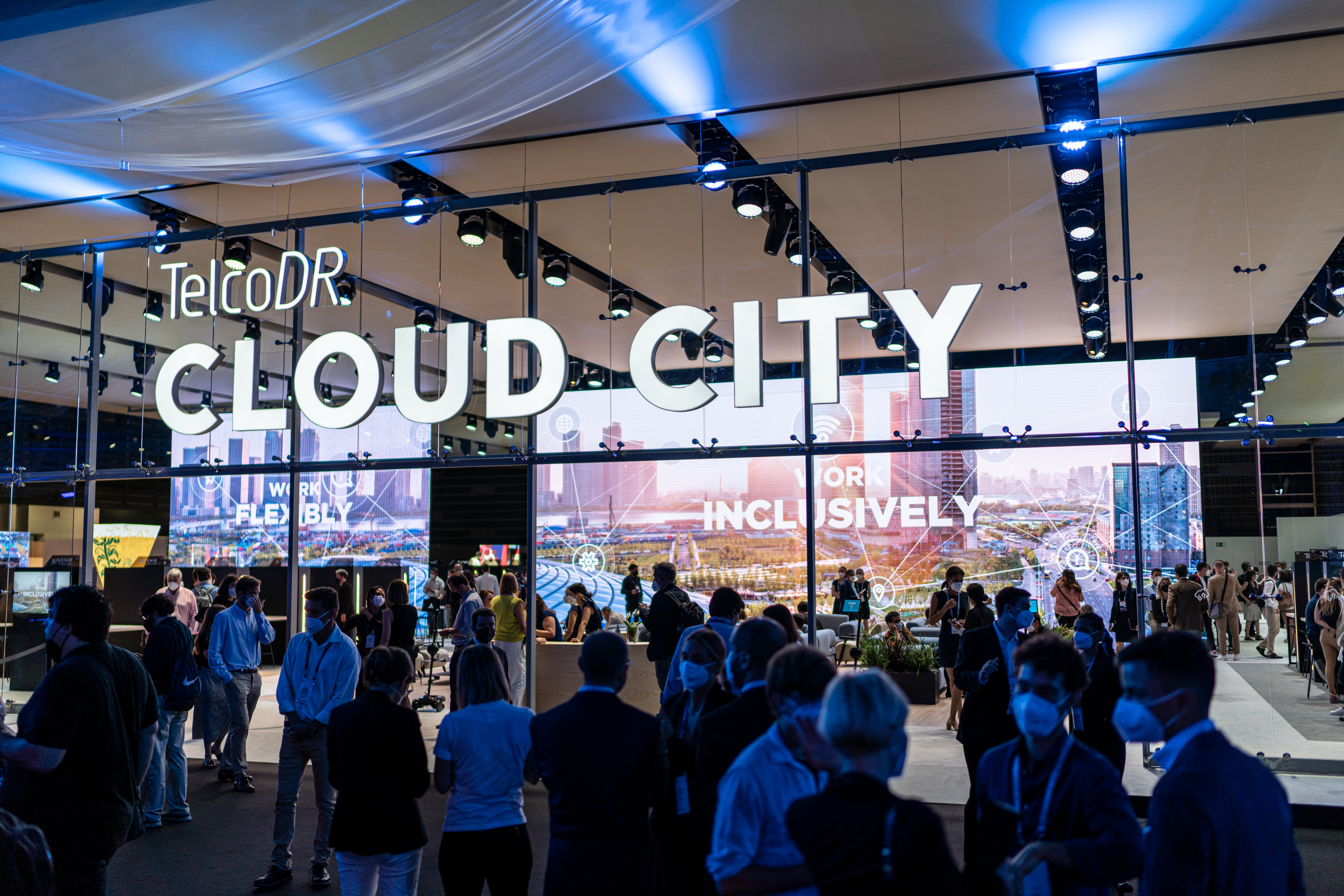
MWC 2021

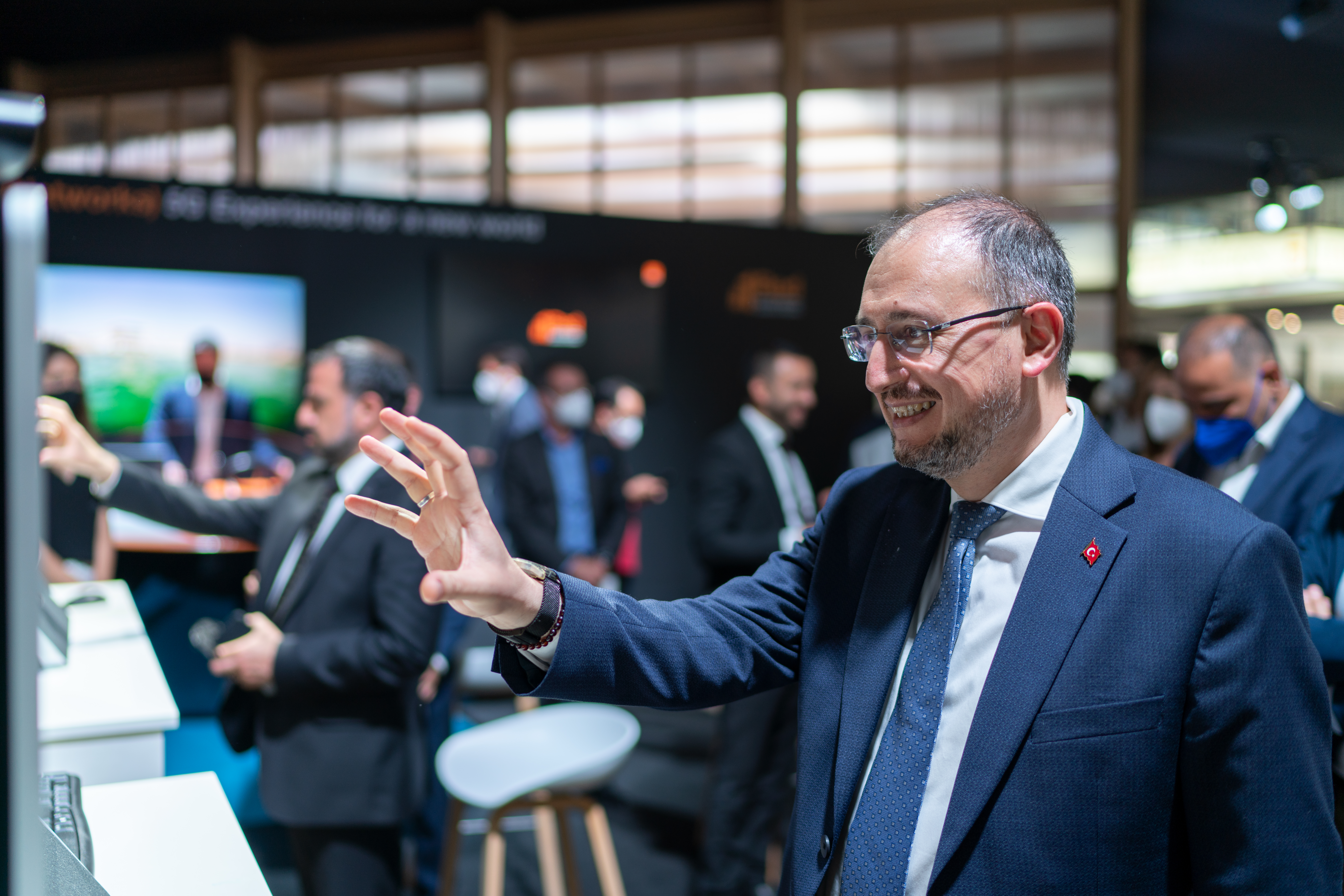
MWC 2021

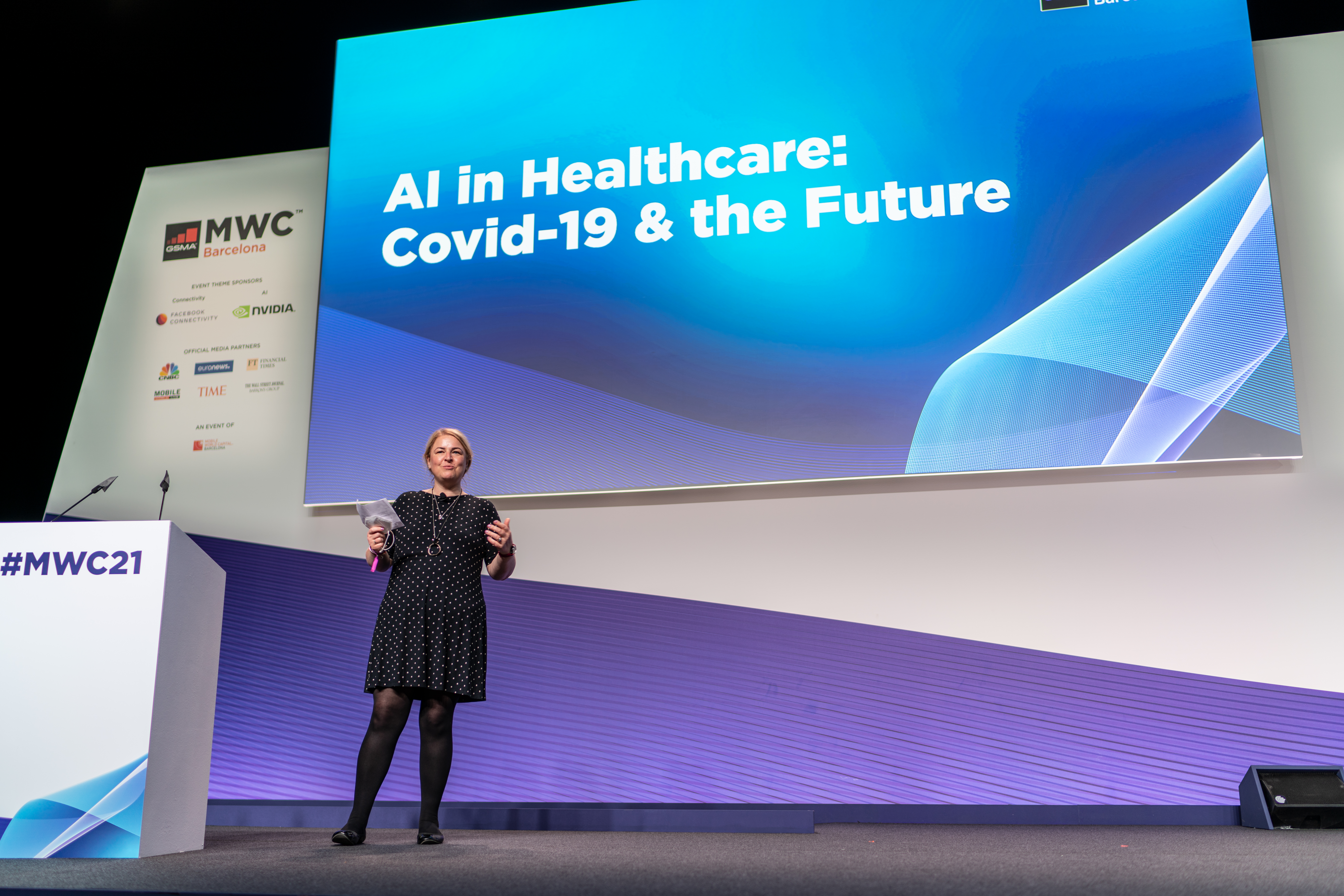
MWC 2021

AGIBOTx2 in MWC 2026

MWC 2026 - Governance

Xiaomi Vision GT Concept in MWC 2026

Indra Race in MWC 2026

GSMA in MWC 2026

MWC 2026

MWC 2026

MWC 2026
