= Leytonstone School =

Coordinates: 51.5755°N 0.0065°E

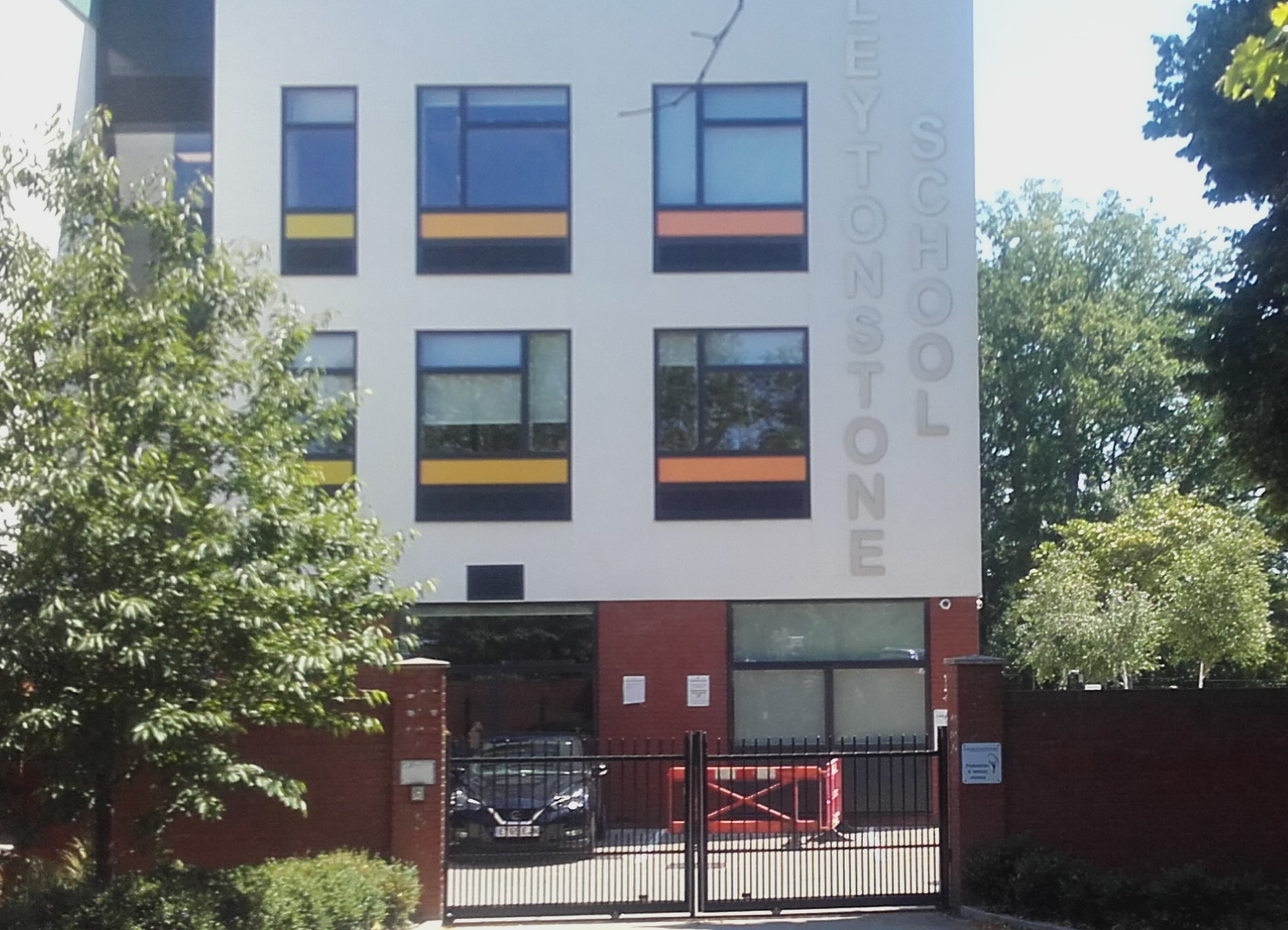

Location
- Colworth Road; Leytonstone; London, E11 1JD; England

Information
- Type: Community school
- Local authority: Waltham Forest
- Department for Education URN: 103101 Tables
- Ofsted: Reports
- Headteacher: Julian Onyelekere
- Gender: Coeducational
- Age: 11 to 16
- Enrolment: 971
- Website: http://www.leytonstoneschool.org/

Leytonstone School is a coeducational community secondary school located on Colworth Road in Leytonstone, London, England.

== Admissions ==
The school formerly specialised in Business and Enterprise. The school numbers 971 students, as of the last Ofsted inspection of the school in 2021.

== History ==
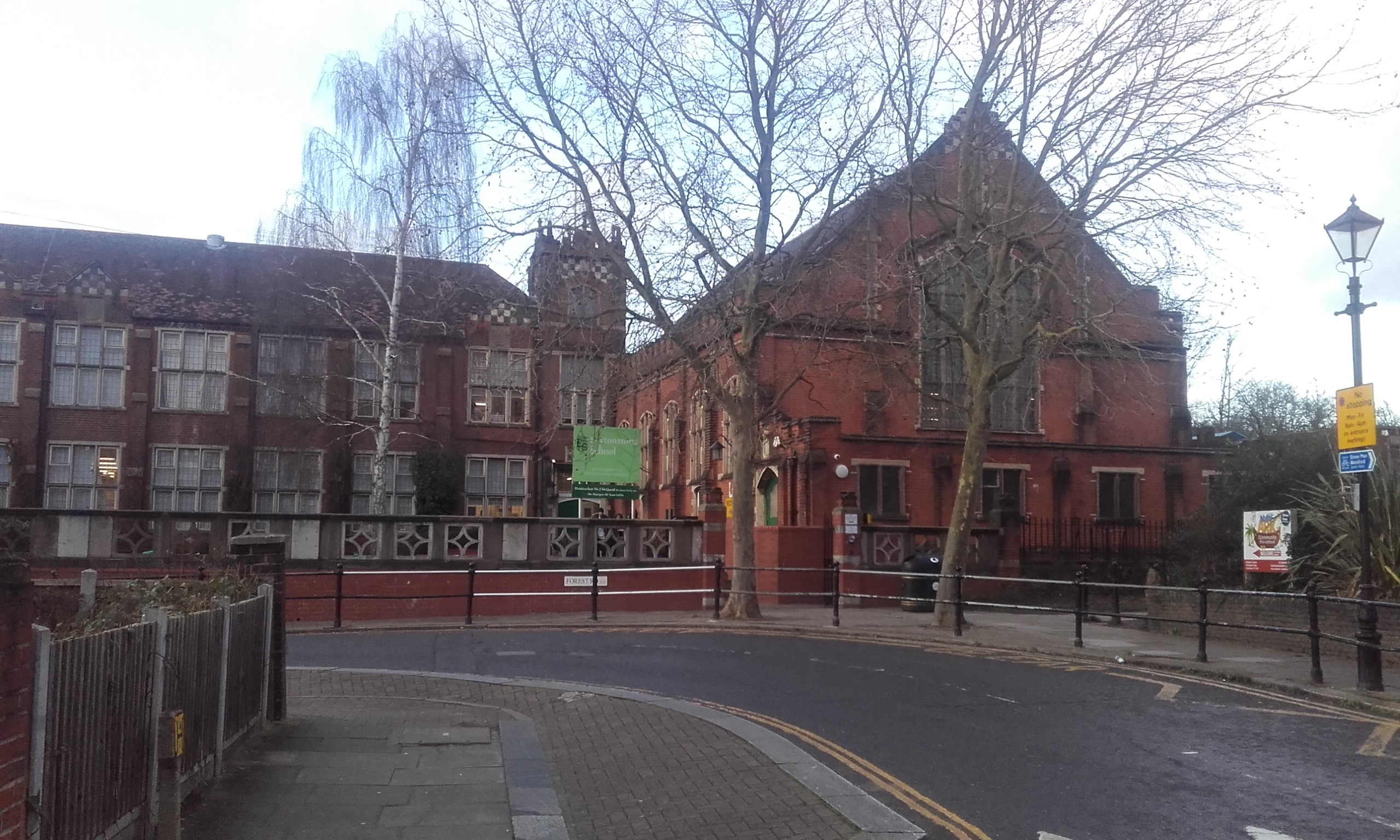
Leytonstone School; the original 1911 building in Colworth Road.

Originally a grammar school called Leyton County High School for Girls, the buildings at the junction of Colworth Road and Forest Road on the edge of Epping Forest were opened in 1911; girls were transferred there from the private Elson House Girls High School in Wallwood Road and from the mixed Leyton and Leytonstone high schools. The school was built on the site of Forest Farm and was designed in the Tudor style by William Jacques ARIBA, who was the architect for the Leyton Urban District Council.

In 1968, it was renamed Leyton Senior High School for Girls when it became a comprehensive school for 14- to 18-year-old girls. In 1986, it became a mixed comprehensive under a borough re-organisation of schools and changed its name to Leytonstone School.

It achieved Business and Enterprise specialist school status in 2007. Successful re-designation in 2008 enabled Leytonstone to retain this specialism and acquire a further specialism, 'Leadership Partners' in February 2009. It has also been designated an HPSS (high performing specialist school).

== Alumni ==
=== Leyton County High School for Girls ===
- Sonita Alleyne, OBE, FRSA, co-founder and former CEO of Somethin’ Else, a media production company, and Master of Jesus College, Cambridge. She is the first black master of any Oxbridge college
- Dame Sharon Michele White DBE, Chairman of the John Lewis Partnership and former Chief Executive of the British media regulator Ofcom.
