= Jez Nelson =

British broadcaster (born 1964)

Jez Nelson MBE
- Born: Jeremy Nelson; 1 April 1964 (age 62)
- Education: Dulwich College; King's College London
- Occupations: Jazz broadcaster; television producer
- Known for: Founder and CEO of Somethin' Else

Jeremy Nelson (born 1 April 1964) is a jazz broadcaster and television producer. He is the founder and CEO of media production company Somethin' Else, which in 2021 became part of Sony Music Entertainment.

== Education ==
Nelson was educated at Dulwich College (a boys' independent school in Dulwich, South London) and at King's College London, where he first began to DJ.

== Career ==
After working on several pirate jazz radio stations, including KJazz, which he and DJ Gilles Peterson set up, Nelson joined Jazz FM soon after it was licensed in 1989. His first show on Jazz FM was on 4 March 1990, and he went on to present a nightly four-hour programme called Something Else, on which he interviewed jazz stars including Herbie Hancock, Nina Simone, Wayne Shorter and Sun Ra.

Having left Jazz FM in 1991, Nelson joined Kiss 100 and, along with former colleagues Sonita Alleyne and Chris Philips, he founded the media production company Somethin' Else. The business has become the largest independent radio production company in the UK and is a leading cross-platform content producer. In 2009, Nelson succeeded Alleyne as CEO of Somethin' Else. In 2021, Somethin' Else was fully acquired by Sony Music Entertainment to become part of a new Global Podcast Division. Jez Nelson, along with Steve Ackerman, became head of this division. He has also presented many BBC television and radio programmes, including It'll Never Work? for Children's BBC, which led to a presenter's role on the primetime Tomorrow's World show. He has also presented Formula Five on BBC Radio 5 and Radio 3's Jazz on 3.

Nelson is a Fellow of The Radio Academy.
