= Somethin' Else (content agency) =

Content agency

- Founded: 1991; 35 years ago
- Headquarters: London, United Kingdom
- Products: Content and strategy across TV, radio, online video, social media, games
- Parent: Sony Music Entertainment (2021–present)
- Website: www.somethinelse.com

Somethin' Else is a London and New York content agency, specialising in content strategy and production across video, television, audio and social media. It was founded in 1991 by Jez Nelson, Chris Philips and Sonita Alleyne, with Steve Ackerman and Paul Bennun later becoming key directors, and was acquired outright by Sony Music Entertainment in 2021, after a number of joint venture projects between the two. The audio department of the company became part of Sony Music's Global Podcast Division headed up by Somethin' Else principals Steve Ackerman and Jez Nelson.

== History ==
Somethin' Else is a media production company set up in 1991. The company's first production was the Gilles Peterson Show, created for the UK's independent radio network in 1993 and currently broadcast by BBC 6 Music in a Saturday afternoon slot.

It is responsible for producing a number of radio programmes for BBC Radio 1, BBC Radio 1xtra, BBC Radio 2 and 6Music with The Kitchen Cabinet and Gardeners' Question Time, made for BBC Radio 4 and Kermode and Mayo's Film Review produced for BBC Radio 5 Live for 21 years. It is the BBC's biggest multi-platform supplier, and as well as producing over 35 weekly radio shows for the corporation, it makes television for BBC 4 and iPlayer and creates social media for the BBC's music radio brands. Television projects have included the modern day version of Jazz 625 for BBC Four, a jazz music programme originally broadcast by BBC 2 in the mid 1960s.

In addition to the BBC, other past and present clients of Somethin' Else have included TOPMAN, The Economist, Channel 4, Interflora, Swarovski, ITV, Penguin Random House, Red Bull, Boots UK, Porsche, Chivas Regal, FIAT, Nissan, Wrigley, Rolls-Royce and The British Phonographic Industry.

Somethin' Else is involved in the social media production of The BRIT Awards as well as a number of productions for Sky Arts such as Guitar Star, The Ronnie Wood Show and Brian Johnson's A Life on the Road.

In 2017, it was the only company in the UK to feature in Campaign Magazine's School Reports and Broadcast Magazine's Top 100. In 2018 the company established an office in New York. After becoming a pioneer in the fledgling UK podcast industry, on 16 June 2021, Sony Music Entertainment announced that the company had acquired Somethin' Else.

On 1 April 2022, the last ever episode of Kermode and Mayo's Film Review was broadcast by the BBC, with Somethin' Else announcing that the replacement show, called Kermode and Mayo's Take, would be a twice weekly podcast series featuring film and television reviews, with the Take 2 podcast being exclusive to subscribers.

== People ==
Somethin' Else's key shareholders at the time of the Sony Music acquisition were Jez Nelson, Steve Ackerman and chairman Tom Barnicoat (former COO at Endemol group). Jon Wilkins (founder of Naked) and Lindsey Clay (CEO Thinkbox) were non-executive directors. Paul Burdin (FD), Lee-Anne Richardson and Ben Kerr were other directors

== Selected projects ==
=== Radio and podcasts ===
- David Tennant Does A Podcast With...
- How To Fail with Elizabeth Day
- The Maxwells
- Where There’s A Will There’s A Wake, with Kathy Burke
- Kermode and Mayo's Take
- The Brights
- Kermode and Mayo's Film Review (BBC Radio 5 Live), 2001–22 (produced from 2011)
- The Penguin Podcast
- BBC Radio 1's Essential Mix (BBC Radio 1), 1993–present
- The weekly audio edition of The Economist – In 2014, editor John Micklethwait claimed that German President Angela Merkel listens to the audio edition in her car
- Gilles Peterson (BBC Radio 6 Music)
- Gardeners' Question Time (BBC Radio 4), 2009–present
- The Radio 1 Rock Show (BBC Radio 1)
- The Kitchen Cabinet (BBC Radio 4)
- Essential Classics (BBC Radio 3)
- 1914 Day By Day ("BBC Radio 4")
- The Selector (NME Radio), 2001–2010
- Jazz on 3 (BBC Radio 3)
- The Surgery (BBC Radio 1)
- Martin Garrix Rocks Blackpool (Combined iPlayer and BBC Radio 1)
- 6-0-6 (BBC Radio 5 Live), 2010–2015
- The Last Post (Podcast) - offshoot of and co-production with The Bugle

=== Television and Video ===
- Brian Johnson's A Life on the Road (Sky Arts)
- Guitar Star (Sky Arts)
- The Ronnie Wood Show (Sky Arts)
- Topman TV
- Online video content for Swarovski, Interflora, Orangina.
- Extreme Festivals for BBC Radio 1 on BBC iPlayer
- Northern Soul: Living for the Weekend (BBC Four)
- Guin and the Dragon (BBC 2)
- Between the Lines (BBC Learning)
- Ten Pieces (BBC Learning)
- Foxy TV for Foxy Bingo

=== Social Media and digital ===
- Social Media for The BRIT Awards (the most tweeted about TV show of all time)
- Social Media for ITV shows including Saturday Night Takeaway, The Voice and Dancing on Ice
- Social Media for BBC Radio brands (Radio 1, 1Xtra, Asian Network, Radio 2, 6 Music)
- Footballers United
- Immersive Oculus Rift experience for the South African Tourist Board
- Papa Sangre (iOS), 2010
- The Nightjar (iOS), 2011
- Papa Sangre II
- Audio Defence: Zombie Arena

== Awards ==
Somethin' Else has won Cannes Lions, eight BAFTA awards and multiple Sony Radio Academy Awards. They were awarded Children's Company of the Year award in the 2013 and 2015 Children's BAFTAs. In 2016, the agency also won a Marketing Week award for 'Most Compelling Content' for their game Silverpoint for Absolut Vodka, and a Broadcast Digital Award for Best Social Media Campaign for its work on the BRIT Awards.
