= Beyond Ynth =

2010 video game

- Developer: Krabl.com
- Publisher: FDG Entertainment
- Series: Ynth
- Platforms: iOS, Android
- Release: September 10, 2010
- Genre: Puzzle
- Mode: Single-player

Beyond Ynth is a mobile, casual game for iOS and Android, developed by Swiss indie game studio Krabl.com, published by German studio FDG Entertainment, and released on September 10, 2010. It is the sequel to Krabl.com's 2009 game, Ynth.

== Plot ==
The game stars Kribl, "a little bug on a big journey to bring light back to the Kingdom of Kriblonia." Kribl traverses many unexplored territories to find all the light-giving Dazzly Diamonds stolen by the Four Dark Spiders of the Apocalypse.

== Critical reception ==
The game has a Metacritic score of 87% based on 7 critic reviews.
