= Papa Sangre =

- Developer: Somethin' Else
- Platform: iOS

Papa Sangre is a horror-themed audio game developed by Somethin' Else for Apple’s iOS devices.

The game has been described by the developer as a "video game with no video" — its environment is rendered exclusively in sound via binaural audio, processed on-the-fly using The Papa Engine, a proprietary audio engine.

== Development ==
The game was released originally in December 2010, with a fully re-written version released in April 2013 based on an entirely new engine. The sequel, Papa Sangre II, was released on Halloween 2013.

The developer had intended to use VoiceOver, an accessibility function on Apple’s iPhone, to help with user interface for those who need to play the game using that function. VoiceOver was not flexible enough to work at the same time as the sound engine, so after discussion with user testers the developer had to create a separate user interface for VoiceOver users, which encouraged them to turn VoiceOver on and off. The development team includes Paul Bennun, Ben Cave, Adam Hoyle of Do Tank Studios, Daniel Jones, Peter Law, Margaret Robertson, Nick Ryan and Tassos Stevens of Coney, with illustration by Sofiski. The team had also created its own 3D audio engine. Papa Sangre was inspired by Sangre Y Patatas. Somethin’ Else thought of pricing the game at £1.99, but Apple encouraged the team to raise the price. At launch, Papa Sangre was priced at £3.99.

== Plot ==
The player character is dead and trapped in Papa Sangre’s kingdom in an afterlife filled with darkness, and needs to save the soul most precious to them trapped in the palace while avoiding a death from dangerous monsters.

== Features ==
Papa Sangre is a thriller/horror game based only on binaural audio. Headphones are required to play. The player moves using foot buttons displayed on screen for each individual step and turns using a built in accelerometer or swiping across the wheel on the top half of the screen. If the player taps each button too fast, the character will fall. While traveling through the world, various sound effects are heard to guide the player. Using binaural audio, the player can determine which direction or how far or close objects are. There are a total of 25 levels to complete as the player tries to survive. The player must collect musical notes and reach the exit to proceed.

== Reception ==
Reception

Aggregate score
Aggregator	Score
Metacritic	80/100

Review scores
Publication	Score
Eurogamer	7/10
Gamezebo	5/5
IGN	9/10
TouchArcade	3/5
148Apps	5/5

Papa Sangre received mixed reviews. The game was criticized for its high price and file size. Papa Sangre received an award for ‘Most Innovative Game’ at Mobile Gaming Awards in March 2011.

== Sequel ==
Papa Sangre II is the sequel to the survival horror audio game Papa Sangre. It was published by Playground Publishing B.V on October 31, 2013. The game has a rating of 92% on Metacritic based on nine critic reviews, making it the best-reviewed iOS game of 2013 by its metrics.
