= Tiki Towers =

2008 video game

- Developer: Mock Science
- Publisher: RealNetworks GameHouse
- Platforms: Wii (WiiWare); iOS; Windows Phone 7
- Release: December 3, 2008: IOS; WW: December 15, 2008; Wii; NA: December 22, 2008
- Genre: Puzzle
- Modes: Single-player, multiplayer

Tiki Towers (known as Tropical Towers in the United Kingdom) is a puzzle video game developed by Mock Science and published by RealNetworks division GameHouse. It was released for WiiWare, BlackBerry, iOS (iPhone, iPod Touch, iPad), Android, Windows Phone and Symbian S60. The game has been likened to the similar puzzle game World of Goo. A sequel titled Tiki Towers 2: Monkey Republic was released in January 2011.

== Gameplay ==
Based around a tropical Tiki culture-theme, the game involves players directing a troupe of monkeys to retrieve bananas by building towers of bamboo scaffolding to reach the fruits, with the ultimate goal of collecting all bananas and having all monkeys reach the designated "exit". This adds conflict as the player usually is tasked with building towers on a limited bamboo budget and if a tower falls it may prevent the monkeys from completing the level.

On the Wii version of the game, while much remains the same (with regard to the mobile versions), one significant difference is that the player must also fend off "evil monkeys" trying to sabotage the player's towers while the "good monkeys" (player's 'troupe') are working toward their goal.

== Development ==
=== Concept ===
Designer Frank Boosman of the Republic of Fun created the concept for Tiki Towers prior to the Nintendo Wii's 2006 launch. Excited by the promise of the Wii, he felt that the Wii's controller, the Wii Remote, would work well with games that required a lot of physical interactions. While listening to a talk by video game designer and entrepreneur Will Wright, Wright said something to the effect of "Monkeys are funny", which gave Boosman the idea of representing building pieces as bamboo and coconuts in his new game and since a friend of his liked Tiki culture, it was used as the game's theme.

=== Design ===
Drawing the bamboo sticks to scale to fit on a small cellphone screen was a difficult task and there wasn't a clear perspective and the sticks had to be functional to implement realistic bending and breaking. In the prototyping stage, the developers did limitation testing to get the physics just right. As development progressed, the game engine became more advanced and multiple layers were added to the graphics to capture the Tiki atmosphere. To simplify the game's structure, all information in the gameplay was placed on menus rather than popup boxes and all islands in the game were placed in a single screen. To boost graphic quality, the developers opted to use symbols instead of text to indicate level progression. Early in the game's development there were going to be different kinds of monkeys - the first to build the bamboo structures and the second to climb on them. There were also going to be small, medium and big monkeys which would have light, medium and heavy weights that would correspond with easy, medium and hard difficulty levels. Both ideas got scrapped and the medium climber monkey made it into the game. The monkeys needed to be scaled just right so that they didn't obscured the every part of the bamboo sticks.

== Reception ==
IGN called Tiki Towers a "fun and playable imitation" of World of Goo, giving it a 7.3/10. WiiWare World gave Tiki Towers a 7/10, noting that "Tiki Towers is not going to win any awards like World of Goo, but at a third of the price it is still well worth a look." AppSpy gave Tiki Towers a 4/5, saying that the game "is for those who enjoy physics based puzzle games involving monkeys". Paul Acevedo for Windows Central gave the game a positive review, stating "With so many levels... the game is an excellent value."

The mobile version was named Casual Game of the Year for 2008 by the IMGA.
