= Secondary animation =

Secondary animation, also known as secondary motion, is a flat motion generated as a reaction to the movement of primary motion by a character. It is significant in animation because it amplifies the character's motion via effects that appear to be driven by the motion, i.e. it makes the character's motion seem natural. Examples of secondary motion include the rippling of water, swish of a cloak, or jiggle of body parts when a person is moving. These passive effects have many degrees of freedom, and complex interactions with characters, thus making them hard to animate by hand (hand animation), or via computer software.

== Techniques ==
Creating a second motion requires using a technique called coupling that combines simulations of individual objects allowing them to interact together to produce secondary motion. The coupling can be divided into three categories: two-way coupled, one-way coupled, and hybrid.

1. Two-way coupled - The purpose of a two-way coupled simulation is to model the interaction as realistically as possible given the component systems. Two-way interactions affect the two components, and the forces applied to one is mirrored by equal and opposite forces applied to the second. The actions of each system directly affect the other. However, the main drawback of this coupling method is the computation time required before the path of an object can be viewed. If simulated alone, the object can be viewed in real time allowing the animator to apply instant changes to its motion. When two simulations are coupled, the animator must wait before a motion can be viewed.
2. One-way coupled - In the one-way coupled system, the interaction forces are applied only to the secondary system, leaving the primary one unaffected. This way of disregarding depends on the assumption that minimal effect will fall upon the primary system. This situation is likely to happen when one system's mass is greater than the other. One advantage of this coupling approach is that it allows the individual simulation of each system. Generally, it is also easier to implement than the two-way coupled system because only the secondary system is adjusted. It also permits the coupling where it is not possible or favorable to modify the primary system such as in the case of a hand-animated character.
3. Hybrid - A hybrid system is a concession between the accuracy of the two-way coupling system and the speed of the one-way coupling. Instead of completely ignoring the effect of the interaction on the primary system, a small approximation from the secondary system is allowed to interact with the primary system. The design and parameters of the approximation provide the animator with additional controls, and because the hybrid coupling is supposed to provide a shorter debug cycle time for the primary system than the two-way coupling method, the animator may interactively modify these parameters until the desired result is reached.
