= Agatha Knife =

2017 video game

- Steam version header art
- Developer: Mango Protocol
- Publishers: Mango Protocol; Plug In Digital (Mobile)
- Engine: Unity
- Platforms: Windows, Mac, Linux, Switch, Xbox One, PlayStation 4
- Release: Windows, Mac, Linux: WW: 27 April 2017; iOS: WW: 18 March 2019; Switch, Xbox One: WW: 26 April 2018; Android: WW: 17 April 2019
- Genre: Adventure

Agatha Knife is a 2017 point-and-click adventure game developed and published by Mango Protocol. It is published by Plug In Digital for iOS and Android. Described as a "satirically humorous narrative adventure", the protagonist creates a religion to convince animals to be slaughtered. Agatha Knife was developed by Spanish independent developer Mango Protocol, and set in the 'Psychotic Adventures' narrative universe alongside the team's 2015 title MechaNika. The developers initially created the game using Java, and ported the game to Unity for a console release in 2018.

Agatha Knife received average reviews, with praise for its visual presentation and dark tone, and mixed views on the game's themes, gameplay, and puzzles.

== Gameplay ==
Screenshot

Agatha Knife is a point-and-click adventure game where players use the cursor to hover over items of interest and characters to interact with using context commands. Players progress by interacting with characters and using items by selecting collected items to use from a backpack inventory. Players control Agatha, who is a seven-year-old insomniac who lives with her mother in a butcher's shop that has trouble making ends meet. Over time, she develops a conflicted relationship between the animals, who she develops compassion for and loves to play with, and her desire to help her mother's business. Agatha's mother prays for a solution. Agatha meets a man who offers to assist them with her problems and convinces her to start her own religion. Agatha develops her own religion, Carnivorism, in an attempt to convince the animals that they can reach the afterlife by sacrificing themselves.

== Development ==
Developer Mango Protocol is based in Barcelona, Spain.

== Reception ==
Reception

Review scores
| Publication | Score |
|---|---|
| Adventure Gamers | 2.5/5 stars |
| Destructoid | 7/10 |
| Nintendo Life | 7/10 stars |
| Nintendo World Report | 7.5 |
| Push Square | 6/10 |

Agatha Knife received "mixed or average" reviews, according to review aggregator Metacritic. Reviewers praised the game's visual presentation and tone. Describing the art style as "charming", Adventure Gamers found the presentation to be both "rough" and "endearing", and depicted gory scenes in ways that were "cutesy enough to avoid being outright grotesque". Nintendo Life praised the "lovely" and "delightful style" of the game's line-drawn comic presentation. Nintendo World Report similarly highlighted the game's "unique" art style and "intense attention to detail". Push Square praised the "distinctive art style" of the game's "simplistic, cartoonish aesthetic", finding it complemented the game's "charming and disturbing" subject matter.

Critics were mixed on the treatment of the game's subject matter, in its exploration of themes including "religion, sexuality, gender, veganism, capitalism and addiction". Adventure Gamers praised the game for "tackling subjects that you don't usually encounter in point-and-click adventures". Nintendo Life noted the game's "confused" perspective on its subject matter and its lack of commentary and "biting criticism" in its "matter-of-fact dismissal" of faith. Destructoid found the protagonist to be "poignant" and noted the game largely handled its themes "in an entertaining-and thought-provoking way", but observed the writing "can get a bit heavy-handed" and "jarring" compared to the "whimsical...nature of the game".

Critics were also mixed on the game's gameplay mechanics and puzzles. Nintendo World Report observed the game featured little gameplay variety, noting the game largely consisted of "walking around and talking to people". Adventure Gamers found the gameplay to feature "irksome issues" and "basic" puzzles, citing "ridiculously obscure" solutions to one puzzle on one hand, and "blatant" directions to solve puzzles for others. Push Square noted the game featured "relatively simplistic" puzzles. Describing aspects of the game as "tedious", Destructoid found there to be "really not much to do" in the game, noting its "slow" character movement and lack of "interactive puzzles".
