= Devil's Attorney =

2012 video game

- Developer: 1337 Game Design
- Publisher: 1337 Game Design
- Platforms: iOS, Android, Blackberry 10
- Release: October 11, 2012
- Genre: Turn-based strategy

Devil's Attorney is a mobile turn-based strategy game developed by Swedish studio 1337 Game Design and originally released on October 11, 2012 for iOS. It was later released for the Android platform on November 11, 2013, and for BlackBerry 10 in the same year.

Set in the 1980s, players take control of Max MacMann, an amoral defense attorney who is only interested in money and success, and attempt to get clients not guilty verdicts.

== Critical reception ==
The game has a Metacritic score of 85% based on 14 critic reviews.

AppSmile wrote "Chock full of humor and RPGish elements, Devil's Attorney is cleverly entertaining and a real treat for mobile gamers." AppAdvice wrote "This universal game is witty, entertaining, and engaging. It looks great, has interesting dialog and offers challenging turn-based strategy gaming that will keep you playing for hours." Gamezebo said "One could say that not playing it would be criminal. And should you be accused of such a felony, I can only hope a lawyer as corrupt as Max McMann is serving as prosecutor." Slidetoplay said "Devil's Attorney is a hilarious spoof of courtroom dramas, with a roguish hero who wins every case by being unscrupulous." 148apps said "The artwork is very polished and the storyline is original and witty. There is a lot of funny banter between the attorneys at the beginning of each round and it's almost as if the developers hired a screenplay writer to write all the content." Toucharcade said "Like Capcom's courtroom drama, Devil's Attorney is an addictive puzzler whose courtroom metaphor for battle makes for one of the most unique and absorbing games you'll find on mobile or any other platform." Games Master UK said "It's a compulsive and occasionally funny ride, but the battles become a tad repetitive."

IGN wrote "Devil's Attorney looks, sounds and plays great. In a sea of games presenting samey turn-based battles, the game's 80s soundtrack, witty banter and innovative courtroom combat successfully stand out from the pack. It's a perfect example of a clever idea executed with quality presentation and design." Multiplayer.it said "Devil's Attorney is an unexpected surprise thanks to its perfect mix of great presentation, amusing sense of humour and simple but deep game mechanics." AppSpy said "Taking turn based RPG combat away from fantasy and sci-fi, and playing things in a courtroom is enough of a spin to make Devil's Attorney worth a play (and the stylish character that the game is infused with doesn't hurt either)." Pocket Gamer uk wrote "It might not have the drama of the courtroom, but Devil's Attorney is still a great way to waste a few hours getting criminals off the hook." Touchgen wrote "Devil's Attorney has got nothing to do with Phoenix Wright. There I said it in the final paragraph. Many had hoped for a new text based adventure game set in a courtroom, but alas Devil's Attorney is not it. It is however a truly fun turn based strategy game set in that very same courtroom. I highly recommend it." Level7.nu said "A turn based strategy game, set in a courtroom with a great atmosphere and fun dialogue. It takes a little too long for the difficulty to kick in, and the game mechanics feel a bit too simple at times." Hyper Magazine said "It's not as funny as it thinks it is, nor as enjoyable."
