= Bounden =

2014 video game

- Developer: Game Oven
- Composer: Bart Delissen
- Engine: Furiosity
- Platforms: iOS, Android
- Release: iOS: WW: 21 May 2014; Android: WW: 3 July 2014
- Genre: Party
- Mode: Local multiplayer

Bounden is a dancing video game developed by Dutch developer Game Oven in collaboration with the Dutch National Ballet. It was released worldwide on iOS on 21 May 2014, and on Android on 3 July 2014.

== Gameplay ==
Bounden guides two players to dance using a single phone. The game features a sphere that rotates using the phone's gyroscope. The sphere has markers placed on top, lined up for the players to pick up by aligning them with the crosshair in the center of the screen. This interface shows both players how to rotate the phone together and in sync. Bounden has 8 dances in total: 4 playful, Twister-like dances made by Game Oven, aimed to get two people entangled. The other 4 are graceful, ballet-like choreographies made by the Dutch National Ballet. The game also features tutorial videos with Dutch National Ballet dancers, intended to show players how to move.

== Development ==
Bounden started as an experiment to make people ‘dance’ together. After various prototypes, Game Oven found a way that was able to make two people, standing opposite of each other, move fluently and synchronously. As designing movements proved to be very difficult, Game Oven called the Dutch National Ballet to help make choreography for the game. Bounden is made in cooperation with the Junior Company of the Dutch National Ballet. The Junior Company is a group of young dancers led by dancer and choreographer Ernst Meisner, who is responsible for most of the choreography in the game. To show the collaboration with the ballet, Game Oven made a series of 'Making of Bounden' videos during the development. Game Oven presented earlier versions of Bounden at the Experimental Gameplay Workshop at the 2014 Game Developers Conference and the Penny Arcade Expo East 2014. Bounden was also selected as part of the Indiecade Showcase at E3 2014 and the European Innovative Games Showcase at GDC Europe 2014.

== Reception ==
Bounden was released on May 21, 2014, and has received mostly positive comments. Many journalists praised Bounden for tricking players into dancing, bringing players closer together, and resulting in a "mess of limbs." Los Angeles Times journalist Todd Martens noted Bounden might lead to "more physical contact than is likely appropriate for near-strangers."
