= Dear Reader (video game) =

2019 video game

- Developer: Local No. 12
- Publisher: Local No. 12
- Designer: Eric Zimmerman
- Platforms: iOS, macOS, tvOS
- Release: September 19, 2019
- Genre: Word puzzle
- Mode: Single-player

Dear Reader is a word puzzle game developed by Local No. 12. and released in September 2019 for iOS, macOS and tvOS as a launch title for Apple Arcade.

== Gameplay ==
Passages from classic novels and poems are displayed as pages and the player is challenged with tasks such as correcting the word order or rearranging phrases. The challenges are time-based depending on the player's preference and completing a passage rewards them with ink. Cheerful music and sound effects accompany the challenges.

== Development ==
Dear Reader was released by Local No. 12, developers of party game Metagame, for iOS, MacOS and tvOS for Apple Arcade subscribers on September 19, 2019. It was crowdfunded on Kickstarter as Losswords in May 2016. The game uses public domain books like Jane Austen's Pride and Prejudice, Claude McKay's Harlem Shadows and Rokeya Sakhawat Hossain's Sultana’s Dream.

== Reception ==
The New York Times found it to be inventive and nimble, evoking "close reading". Eurogamer said it keeps adding new ideas and a sense of panic to figure out "someone's voice". TouchArcade said it to be relaxing and found it to be educational.

It won Best Meaningful Play at the 2020 International Mobile Gaming Awards.
