= Shadowmatic =

2015 video game

- App icon
- Developer: Triada Studio Games
- Publisher: Triada Studio Games
- Director: Ara Aghamyan
- Designer: Arsen Avoyan
- Programmer: Bagrat Dabaghyan
- Composer: Serge Melkonyan
- Engine: In-House
- Platforms: iOS, Android, Apple TV
- Release: iOS: WW: January 15, 2015; Android: WW: March 3, 2017
- Genre: Puzzle
- Mode: Single-player

Shadowmatic is a puzzle game developed and published by Armenian indie studio Triada Studio Games. Shadowmatic is a puzzle where the player rotates abstract objects in a spotlight to find recognizable silhouettes in projected shadows, relevant to the surrounding environment. The project is focused on delivering photorealistic graphics across iOS devices, combined with a challenging and relaxing gameplay. Shadowmatic was released on January 15, 2015 for iOS. The game won a 2015 Apple Design Award for the attention to detail, high-fidelity rendering, excellent execution, and perfect representation of multi-touch gameplay.

== Gameplay ==
Shadowmatic is a single player shadow puppet game. In the game, the player is presented with a very obscure, abstract object that, generally, does not resemble anything. There is an off-screen light source casting a shadow on the wall and the player's task is to rotate the object until the shadow forms a recognizable silhouette. Some levels feature two or three floating objects, adding more dimensions to the solution as the player attempts to not only rotate them correctly, but also position them relative to each other within 3D space, and thereby reveal the silhouette. In the levels with two or three objects, a button is supplied to switch control between them. Holding down this button and sliding a finger on the screen orbits the two objects around each other, which is a necessary aspect of the shadow's formation.

Like other puzzle games, Shadowmatic is based on levels. Each level is themed, and the theme is reflected in the room's surroundings—the animal levels, for example, take place in what looks like a jungle, while baby-themed levels take place in a nursery. The player will have to solve each stage before being able to move on to the next. In total, Shadowmatic has 70 levels that are spread out across the nine rooms. A progress meter at the bottom indicates how close the player is to finding it — the more dots are lit up, the closer.

If the player is stuck, there is a hints system, where they can pay with the in-game currency to reveal a clue about the silhouette they are trying to find. The developers recommend against using the clue so that the player can enjoy the game to the fullest. In-app purchases exist to purchase more hints. The player can also earn hints by completing levels. The players earn hint-points depending on how fast they can solve it, and there are also secondary objectives and secrets that they'll discover as they go. The game has full Game Center integration for three leaderboards (score, completed levels, and secrets found), as well as 24 achievements to obtain.

== Accolades ==
Shadowmatic has received several awards including: "Best Game Art" Indie Prize at the Casual Connect Amsterdam 2016, "Excellence in Visual Art" and the "Media Choice Award" at the DevGAMM Moscow 2015. In June 2015 the game received the prestigious Apple Design Award at the Apple Worldwide Developers Conference 2015. Shadowmatic was featured in the CNN International's "Silk Road: Past, Present, Future" show's segment on digital technology and innovation in Armenia.
