= List of N-Gage games =

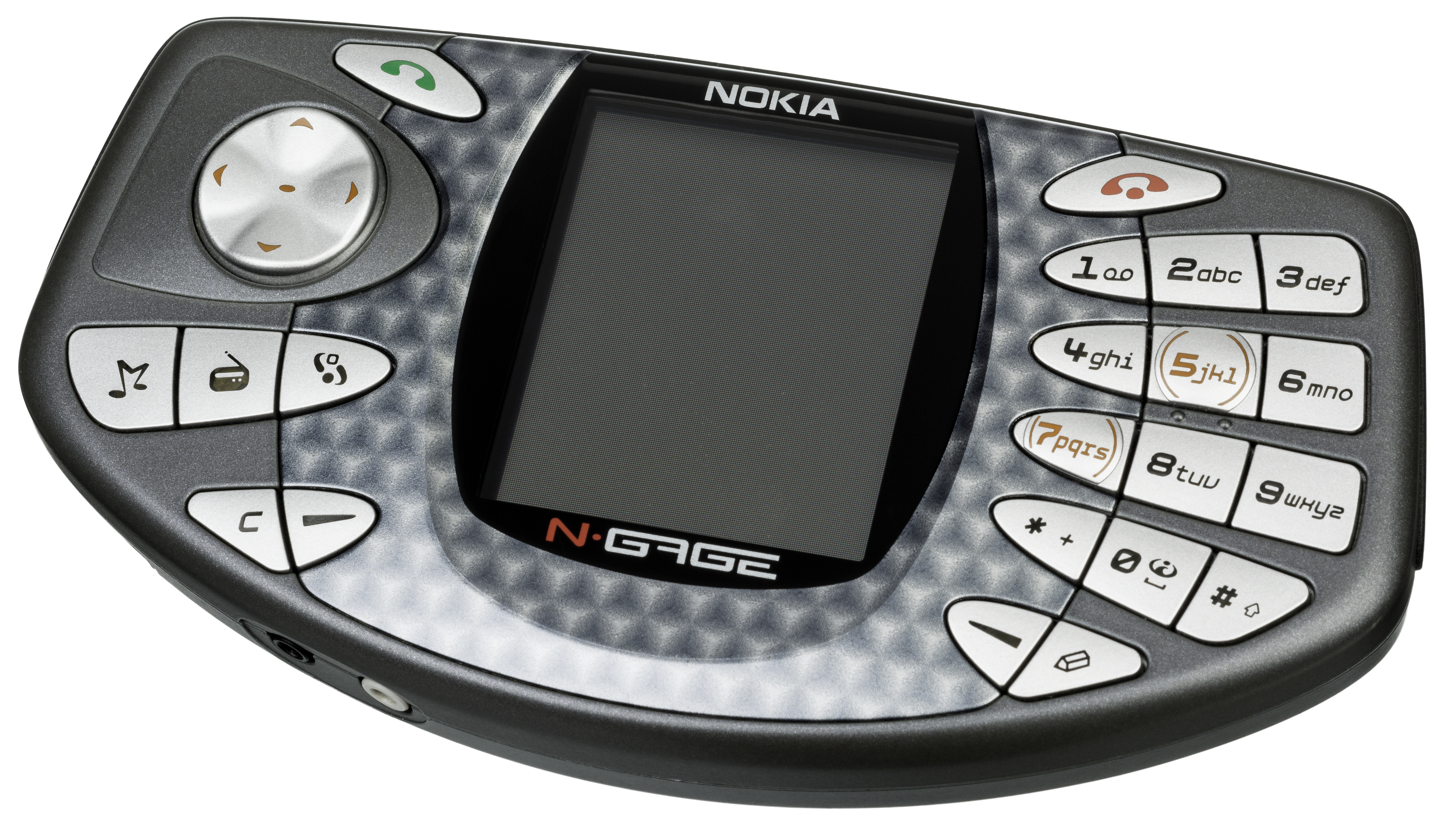
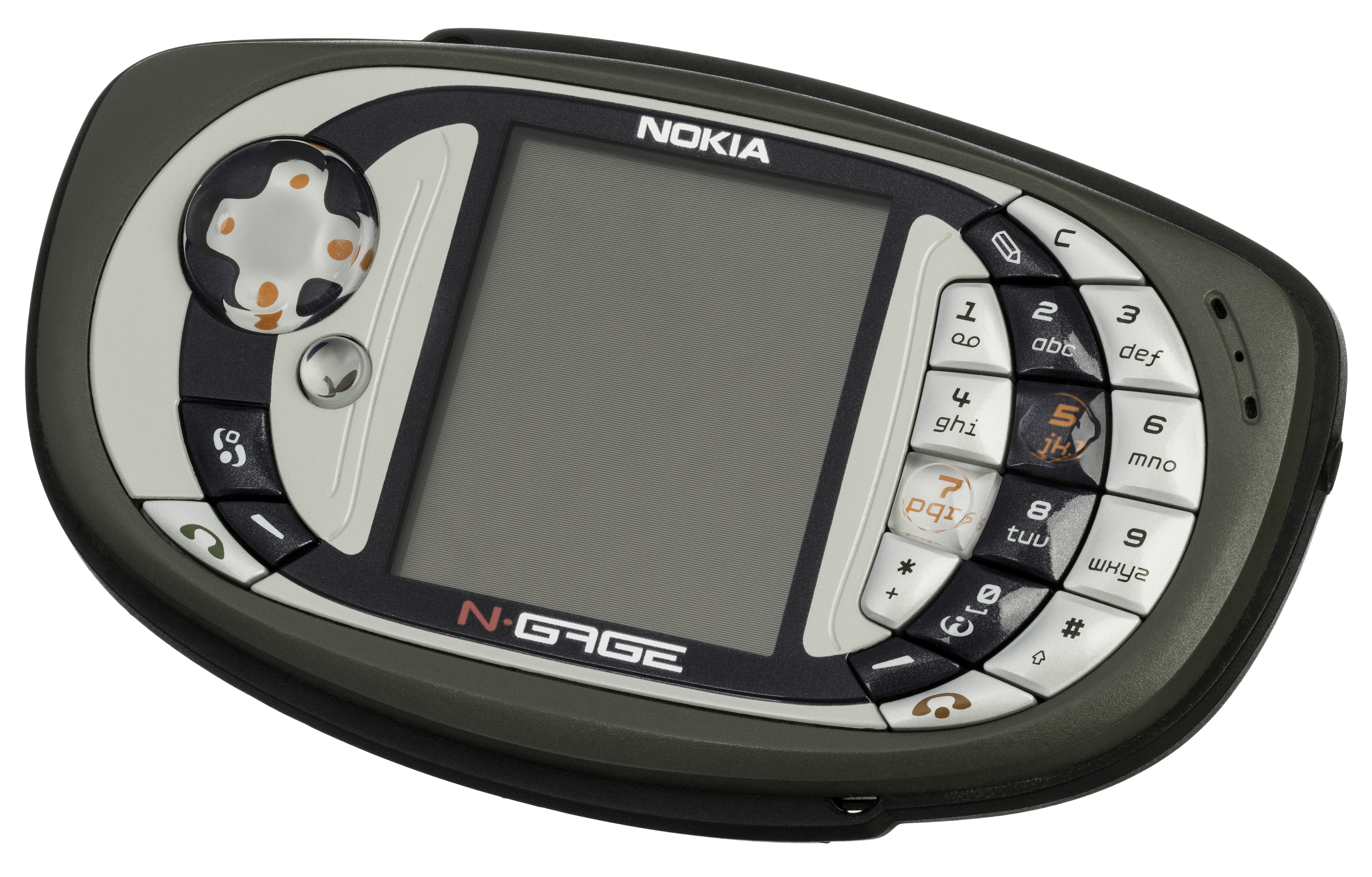
Left to right: Nokia N-Gage, Nokia N-Gage QD

The N-Gage is a PDA-like device that combined features of a cell phone and a handheld game console, developed and designed by Nokia and released on October 7, 2003. The following lists contains all of the known games released for the N-Gage, as well as unreleased games. Only 58 of the games developed for the system received a North American retail release, with two retail releases being exclusive for PAL territories. However, a few titles only saw release through either digital distribution or bundles that came inside a MMC movie card. In addition, one more game, Space Impact Evolution X, came with the system on CD-ROM that was later made available for Symbian S60v2 cell phones.

== Games ==
There are 65 (Note: This number is always up to date by this script.) officially released N-Gage games on this list.

Regions released	Region description	Released
NA (North America)	North America and other NTSC territories.	58
PAL	PAL/SECAM territories: much of Europe, China, Brazil and Australia.	64

Title	Genre(s)	Developer(s)	Publisher(s)	Release date(s)	
Title	Genre(s)	Developer(s)	Publisher(s)	NA	PAL
Ashen	First-person shooter	Torus Games	Nokia	25 May 2004	17 June 2004
Asphalt Urban GT	Racing	Gameloft	Nokia	15 November 2004	15 November 2004
Asphalt: Urban GT 2	Racing	Gameloft	Gameloft	6 December 2005	6 December 2005
Atari Masterpieces Vol. I	Compilation	Digital Eclipse	Atari Interactive	13 October 2005	13 October 2005
Atari Masterpieces Vol. II	Compilation	Digital Eclipse	Atari Interactive	30 March 2006	30 March 2006
Barakel: The Fallen Angel	Hack and slash	StormBASIC Games	Nokia, Technobubble Entertainment	Unreleased	2004
Bomberman	Arcade, Maze, Strategy	Hudson Soft	Hudson Soft	4 August 2004	4 July 2004
Call of Duty	First-person shooter	OmegaSoft	Activision	23 November 2004	10 November 2004
Catan	Board game, Strategy	thinkArts	Capcom	10 October 2005	10 October 2005
Civilization	Turn-based strategy	Gryphondale Studios	Atari Interactive	2 March 2006	24 February 2006
Colin McRae Rally 2005	Racing	Ideaworks3D	Codemasters	5 November 2004	29 November 2004
Crash Nitro Kart	Racing	Vicarious Visions	Vivendi Universal Games	30 June 2004	28 July 2004
FIFA Football 2004	Sports	Electronic Arts Canada, Exient Entertainment	Electronic Arts	14 January 2004	24 December 2003
FIFA Football 2005	Sports	Electronic Arts Canada, Exient Entertainment	Electronic Arts	10 November 2004	27 October 2004
Flo-Boarding	Sports	Housemarque	Nokia	Unreleased	7 October 2003
Glimmerati	Racing	Bugbear Entertainment	Nokia	16 August 2005	7 July 2005
High Seize	Turn-based tactics	RedLynx	Nokia	28 October 2005	13 October 2005
Marcel Desailly Pro Soccer	Sports	G Artist	Gameloft	28 April 2004	10 May 2004
Metal Gear Solid Mobile	Action-adventure, Stealth	Ideaworks3d	Konami	March 19, 2008	Unreleased
Mile High Pinball	Pinball	Bonus.com, Ideaworks3D	Nokia	14 November 2005	1 October 2005
MLB Slam!	Sports	Hexacto Games	Jack of All Games, THQ Wireless	31 October 2003	10 December 2003
MotoGP	Racing	THQ Wireless	Nokia	14 November 2003	18 November 2003
NCAA Football 2004	Sports	Exient Entertainment	Jack Of All Games, Electronic Arts	10 December 2003	16 December 2003
N-Gage Freestyle	Extreme sports	StormBASIC Games	Nokia, Technobubble Entertainment	Unreleased	2005
ONE	Fighting	Digital Legends Entertainment	Nokia	13 October 2005	14 October 2005
Operation Shadow	Action-adventure	Torus Games	Nokia	29 September 2004	30 September 2004
Pandemonium!	Platform	Ideaworks3D	Eidos Interactive	6 October 2003	7 October 2003
Pathway to Glory	Turn-based tactics	RedLynx	Nokia	24 November 2004	26 November 2004
Pathway to Glory: Ikusa Islands	Turn-based tactics	RedLynx	Nokia	8 November 2005	8 November 2005
Payload	Action, Vehicular combat	Tantalus Interactive	Nokia	14 November 2005	16 May 2006
Pocket Kingdom: Own the World	MMORPG	Sega	Nokia	24 November 2004	29 November 2004
Pool Friction	Sports	StormBASIC Games	Nokia, Technobubble Entertainment	Unreleased	2005
Puyo Pop	Puzzle	Lavastorm Engineering	Sega	6 October 2003	7 October 2003
Puzzle Bobble VS	Puzzle	Taito	Jack Of All Games, Nokia	10 October 2003	10 October 2003
Rayman 3	Platform	Gameloft	Gameloft	11 December 2003	26 November 2004
Red Faction	First-person shooter	Monkeystone Games	THQ Wireless	10 December 2003	12 December 2003
Requiem of Hell	Role-playing game	Digital-Red Mobile Software	Nokia	22 November 2004	22 November 2004
Rifts: Promise of Power	Tactical role-playing game	Backbone Entertainment	Nokia	31 October 2005	1 October 2005
Romance of the Three Kingdoms: Hero Occurrence (Note: Exclusively released in China in 2004.)	Fighting	Digital-Red Mobile Software	Nokia	Unreleased	Unreleased
Sega Rally Championship	Racing	Hitmaker	Sega	1 January 2004	1 January 2004
Snakes	Arcade, Maze	IOMO	Nokia	25 January 2005	25 January 2005
SonicN	Platform	Dimps	Sega	7 October 2003	7 October 2003
Space Impact Evolution X	Shoot 'em up	Kuju Entertainment	Nokia	1 October 2003	1 October 2003
Spider-Man 2	Action-adventure	Activision, Digital Eclipse	Activision	2 July 2004	6 July 2004
SSX Out of Bounds	Snowboarding	Exient Entertainment	Electronic Arts	24 January 2005	19 January 2005
Super Monkey Ball	Platform	Sega, Realism	Sega	6 October 2003	7 October 2003
System Rush	Racing	Ideaworks3D	Nokia	20 September 2005	22 September 2005
TechWars	Action	StormBASIC Games	Nokia, Technobubble Entertainment	Unreleased	2005
The Elder Scrolls Travels: Shadowkey	Role-playing game	TKO Software, Vir2L Studios	Bethesda Softworks, Vir2L Studios	11 November 2004	24 November 2004
The King of Fighters Extreme	Fighting	Hudson Soft	SNK Playmore	31 January 2005	12 January 2005
The Roots: Gates of Chaos	Action, Role-playing game	P.S. ASSA - Tannhasuer Gate Sp. z o.o.	Cenega Publishing, Nokia	15 August 2005	31 August 2005
The Sims Bustin' Out	God game, Life simulation	Ideaworks3D	Electronic Arts	10 May 2004	12 May 2004
Tiger Woods PGA Tour 2004	Sports	Digital Eclipse	Electronic Arts	24 June 2004	24 June 2004
Tom Clancy's Ghost Recon: Jungle Storm	Tactical shooter	Gameloft	Gameloft	11 August 2004	10 August 2004
Tom Clancy's Splinter Cell: Chaos Theory	Stealth	Gameloft	Gameloft	23 March 2005	29 March 2005
Tom Clancy's Splinter Cell: Team Stealth Action	Stealth	Gameloft	Gameloft	5 December 2003	10 December 2003
Tomb Raider	Action-adventure, Puzzle-platform	Ideaworks3D	Eidos Interactive	6 October 2003	7 October 2003
Tony Hawk's Pro Skater	Extreme sports	Ideaworks3D	Activision	10 October 2003	13 October 2003
Virtua Tennis	Sports	Hitmaker	Sega	14 December 2003	14 December 2003
Warhammer 40,000: Glory in Death	Turn-based strategy	Razorback Developments	THQ Wireless	6 April 2006	6 April 2006
Worms World Party	Artillery, Strategy	Paragon 5, Team17	THQ Wireless	19 April 2005	15 April 2005
WWE Aftershock	Fighting, Sports	Exient Entertainment	THQ Wireless	15 August 2005	11 July 2005
X-Men Legends	Action role-playing game	Barking Lizards Technologies	Activision	7 February 2005	1 January 2005
X-Men Legends II: Rise of Apocalypse	Action role-playing game	Barking Lizards Technologies	Activision	31 October 2005	27 October 2005
Xanadu Next	Action role-playing game	Nihon Falcom, ScriptArts	Nokia	20 June 2005	20 June 2005

== Cancelled games ==
A number of games were either announced or already in development before ultimately being cancelled.

Title	Genre	Developer(s)	Publisher(s)	Planned Release Date/Last Year Developed or Mentioned	Notes/Reasons						
Title	Genre	Developer(s)	Publisher(s)	Planned Release Date/Last Year Developed or Mentioned	Notes/Reasons	8-Kings	Turn-based tactics	Argonaut Games	Nokia	2003	Artwork exists and screenshots exists. Several prototypes leaked in 2023.
Alien Front	Action	Sega	Sega	9 February 2004	Beta prototype exists.						
Aquababe: Freaky Gardening	Action	Byte Defenders	Living Mobile	—N/a	No prototype has surfaced.						
Bounce	Adventure	Rovio Entertainment	Nokia	—N/a	No prototype has surfaced.						
Brothers in Arms	Shooter		Gameloft	30 November 2006	Pictures of Gameplay exist.						
Dawn	Shooter	Nokia	Nokia	11 May 2004	The game has been released as Ashen.						
DRIV3R	Racing, Shooter	Reflections Interactive, V3D Production	Atari SA	2005	No prototype has surfaced.						
Fussball Manager Pro	Sportsimulation	Bigben Interactive	Bigben Interactive	—N/a	No prototype has surfaced.						
Gekido	Beat 'em up	NAPS team	DSI Games	26 September 2003	Screenshots exists. No prototype has surfaced.						
Habbo Islands	Life simulation	Sulake Corporation	Nokia	2009	A prototype ROM image was leaked online in 2014.						
Hinter Wars: The Aterian Invasion	MMORPG	Activate Interactive	Nokia	Q1 2006	Also planned for PC. Received a closed beta test. Prototype surfaced in 2022. Screenshots and trailer exists.						
Joe	Action	Humansoft	—N/a	10 February 2010	Also planned for PSP and only promotional images exists.						
Kart Racing	Racing	—N/a	Nokia	Q1 2004	No prototype has surfaced.						
Leisure Suit Larry: Pocket Party	Adventure	TKO Software	Nokia, Vivendi Universal Games	Q1 2005	Concept art and design document are in hands of Jody Hicks, one of the game's developers. Also alive Alpha prototype was spotted at ObscureGamers forum in February 2021. Other screenshots were released later.						
Lex Ferrum	Action	YDreams/Blueshark Studio	YDreams	3 March 2006	Artwork exists.						
Pit Runner	Combat-Kart Racer	Tantalus	Nokia	Fall 2005	No prototype has surfaced						
Shade: Wrath of Angels	Role-playing game	Cenega Publishing	Cenega Publishing, Nokia	9 June 2004	No prototype has surfaced.						
Shadow-Born	MMORPG	Backbone Entertainment	Nokia	2009	No prototype has surfaced.						
Stunt Car Extreme	Racing	Fathammer	Nokia	—N/a	French homebrew team QueenMeka acquired a 'finalised' beta prototype in 2020. A download is available on their blog post as well as a physical MMC copy bundled with two other games.						
Spirits	Board game, Collectible card game, MMORPG	Jadestone	Jadestone	2009	No prototype has surfaced., Demo was playable at E3 2005. Trailer, screenshots & Conceptart exist.						
Taito Memories	Compilation	Nokia	Taito	31 December 2015	Artwork, screenshots and prototype exists.						
Tiger Woods PGA Tour 2005	Sports	Electronic Arts	Electronic Arts	1 October 2004	Screenshots exists. No prototype has surfaced.						
The Urbz: Sims in the City	God game, Life simulation	Griptonite Games	Electronic Arts	—N/a	No prototype has surfaced.						
Virtua Cop	Rail shooter	Sega	Sega	26 July 2004	Beta prototype exists.						
Virtually Board Snowboarding II	Sports	Fathammer	Nokia	—N/a	No prototype has surfaced.						
Xyanide	Shoot 'em up	Overloaded Pocket Media	Playlogic	21 May 2004	A demo version 1.2 exists. Originally entering any item would only shows highscores. Only arcade mode is available for playing after applying a fan patch.						

== Aftermarket releases ==
Title	Genre(s)	Developer(s)	Publisher(s)	Release date(s)	Notes
Parasite Pack	Platform, Arcade, Maze, Puzzle	Lowtek Games	Lowtek Games	1 April 2025	This video game compilation features three games: Flea!, Flea! 2 and Tapeworm Disco Puzzle. It was previously released officially on Nintendo Switch, Xbox One, Xbox Series X and S, PlayStation 4 and PlayStation 5 on 1 July 2022.

== See also ==
- Lists of video games
