= N-Gage (service) =

Digital video game distribution platform for Nokia devices

- Home screen of N-Gage
- Developer: Nokia
- Launched: 4 February 2008 (pre-release); 3 April 2008 (full release)
- Discontinued: September 2010
- Platform: Symbian - S60
- Status: Discontinued
- Website: www.n-gage.com (archived)

N-Gage, also referred to as N-Gage 2.0, was a mobile gaming digital distribution platform from Nokia that was available for several Nokia smartphones running on S60 (Symbian). The successor to the original N-Gage gaming device and launched as part of their Ovi initiative in 2007, it aimed to offer AAA games for trial and purchase into a single application with full compatibility to all devices, along with online multiplayer and social features using N-Gage Arena via in-house servers. Games on the platform were natively coded or ported using C++. Testing began in Finland in February 2007, but the service faced numerous delays before the service finally rolled out on April 3, 2008 with five launch titles, initially for Nokia N81, N82 and N95 owners.

Less than two years after its full launch, on October 30, 2009, Nokia announced that no new N-Gage games would be produced. A total of 49 games were released for it. Nokia moved its games onto their Ovi Store thereafter. N-Gage games can still be played on compatible devices, but support for the online features ceased in September 2010.

== Development ==
Nokia's N-Gage gaming smartphone from 2003 did not perform as well as expected, and its upgraded QD version did not make any significant impact on the N-Gage's reputation. During E3 2005, Nokia announced that they would rebrand the N-Gage platform as a gaming service on several smartphone devices, rather than releasing a specific device.

At E3 2006, Nokia formally announced the N-Gage mobile gaming service, set for a 2007 release and previewed several titles. N-Gage was previewed for developers and publishers in January 2007. In February 2007, Nokia announced that the service would be piloted in Finland prior to its worldwide launch. As with the original N-Gage, the company had its own unit named Nokia Games Publishing to oversee the creation and publishing of first-party game titles.

== Launch ==
An official promotional image during the 29 August 2007 announcement: The N-Gage application home screen (right) and a game being played (left) on a Nokia N81.

The N-Gage gaming service was announced to have a "first access" release in December 2007, but it was delayed as Nokia's team were making sure the service ran "smoothly". By this time, Nokia had attracted a number of third-party publishers, including Electronic Arts, THQ, Gameloft and Capcom. Nokia used the tagline Get out and play to promote the platform.

=== First access ===
A public beta test of the N-Gage application took place from 4 February 2008 to 27 March 2008, though limited only for the N81. This period of time was referred to as "First Access" and was a public test of the client which could be downloaded for free from the N-Gage website. While not the final version, the user had access to most of the features that the new application had to offer along with trial versions of three games: Hooked On: Creatures of the Deep, System Rush: Evolution and Space Impact: Kappa Base. One day after the start of the public beta, hackers managed to unpack the N-Gage installation file and modded it to work on other Nokia Nseries devices such as N73 and N95.

=== Public release ===
The full release of the N-Gage platform went live to the public on 3 April 2008. There were five launch titles: Asphalt 3: Street Rules, Brain Challenge, Hooked On: Creatures of the Deep, System Rush: Evolution, and World Series of Poker: Pro Challenge. Three other games that were planned on launch (Space Impact: Kappa Base, Block Breaker Deluxe and Tetris) were announced to have been postponed for performance reasons with a planned release date of "next week or two." The five initially supported handsets were: Nokia N81, N81 8GB, N82, N95 and N95 8GB.

On April 7, Nokia posted an official press release for the release of the service, and at which point FIFA 08 also became available for purchase. There were reports in May 2008 that some users were "angry" about N-Gage's digital rights management (DRM) protection in that every game purchased would be not locked to the user's account but to the handset, meaning they have to buy the game again if they change handsets.

== Compatibility ==
The N-Gage platform was compatible with: Nokia N78, N79, N81, N81 8GB, N82, N85, N86, N86 8MP, N95, N95 8GB, N96, N97, Nokia 5320 XpressMusic, 5630 XpressMusic, 5730 XpressMusic Nokia 6210 Navigator, 6710 Navigator, 6720 Classic, E52, E55 and E75. Due to memory issues, support for the Nokia N73, N93 and N93i was cancelled. Support for the Nokia 5800 XpressMusic was promised when it launched but was never officially rolled outo.

Because N-Gage is a software based solution, the first generation MMC games are not compatible with the new platform, though some games made a comeback in the form of a sequel (e.g. System Rush: Evolution) or a remake/port (e.g. Mile High Pinball). Similarly, games developed for this next-gen N-Gage platform do not work on the original N-Gage nor N-Gage QD, adding to the fact that newer S60 software, including the N-Gage client and games, aren't binary-compatible with older S60 devices and vice versa.

== Interface and social features ==
The N-Gage client app functioned as an app store, software updater, instant messaging client, and personal achievement record. Nokia was inspired by Microsoft’s Xbox Live service in creating the user interface of the app. At the top of the N-Gage launcher are five tabs for each function. The My Games screen shows all the games that are currently installed on the phone. The Profile tab displays the user's profile, showing how many N-Gage points the user scored scored, their reputation level (ranging between 1-5 stars), the number of friends they have, and their avatar/picture. Users could also track progress through trophies/achievements.

The Showroom displayed all games that were available for download as well as Game Extras for expanding a game with extra content. Games could be downloaded directly to the phone over the air (by GPRS, 3G or WiFi), or the user may choose to download it to a computer and then install it on to the phone using a USB-cable and Nokia PC Suite.

N-Gage Arena was the online service for the N-Gage community and included message boards, live chats, share user created content, tournament activities, and instant messaging. Users could also invite friends to play a game.

== Reception ==
IGN's hands-on report found that the user interface was good and that Nokia's strategy of preloading the application on newly shipped devices will help. The website Trusted Reviews gave a score of three out of five to the N-Gage service with the comment that the strategy is more sensible than first generation N-Gage but that the platform still lacks quality titles and that the hardware is still behind established handheld game consoles.

In March 2009, Nokia announced that there were one million registered users of N-Gage.

After the discontinuation of the N-Gage service was announced in October 2009, publications had not only noted the platform's flaws that led to its fate but also gave some praise to Nokia for a number of own-IP and self-published games it made for the platform. Pocket Gamer wrote that first-party titles had been "uniformly excellent" and well tailored, such as the rhythm game Dance Fabulous. Praise has also been given to Hooked On: Creatures of the Deep, ONE, and Reset Generation, the latter of which was referred to as the N-Gage service's "killer app" by All About Symbian.

=== Awards ===
Several of the N-Gage service games - all being first/second-party titles - were nominated for International Mobile Gaming Awards in 2007. Two out of three N-Gage titles received an award:

- ONE by Digital Legends won the Best 3D award.
- Dirk Dagger and the Fallen Idol by Jadestone won the Best Gameplay award.
- Hooked On: Creatures of the Deep by Infinite Dreams Inc. was nominated for Best Gameplay.

On 8 May 2008, Hooked On: Creatures of the Deep won a Games Award during the 2008 Meffy Awards in Cannes.

=== Legacy ===
Fourteen years after the N-Gage launch title Hooked On: Creatures of the Deep, its developer Infinite Dreams Inc. created and released a modern version called Creatures of the Deep that was released for iOS and Android in November 2022, and in turn a single-player version of that on the Apple Arcade service in July 2026.

== Closure ==
Nokia launched the Ovi Store on 26 May 2009, a single marketplace including for Java-developed games, and had already announced before that N-Gage games will be offered on the new store in addition to the existing N-Gage client app. On 30 October 2009, Nokia announced that no new games for the N-Gage service would be produced. All N-Gage services, which includes purchasing of games and the online features remained in operation until being shut down in September 2010. Later on 31 March 2011 Nokia closed their DRM activation service, leaving customers unable to reactivate their purchases in the case of a device format or software update. No transition of their purchases was made to the Ovi Store, and no compensation was given because, according to support staff, software purchases are only supported for one year.

Some gaming websites e.g. Pocket Gamer link N-Gage's failure to the overwhelming competition it faces from Apple's App Store, and has been critical of third-party titles of which many were "lazy Java ports". Ovi Gaming cited poor implementation and support from their parent company, Nokia. A bad development model and marketing have also been cited. Ewan Spence of All About Symbian wrote that keeping the "N-Gage" name, despite the failure of its predecessor, was a mistake. He also noted that N-Gage titles simply didn't sell well enough compared to their Java and iPhone OS counterparts.

== Technical details ==
=== Specifications ===
In order for the N-Gage platform and games to run smoothly, all N-Gage compatible mobile devices share a common set of specifications:

- Screen: landscape or portrait 320 x 240 pixels (except N97, with a 640 x 360 pixels screen, graphics are stretched and displayed in a letterbox format to keep aspect ratio)
- OS: Symbian S60 3rd edition (S60 5th edition on N97)
- Interface: 5 way (up, down, left, right, center) directional pad, Dedicated action buttons Circle and Square (Mapped onto keypad '5' and '0' in portrait mode) and 2 contextual buttons. Touch screen interactions were not supported (N97 emulated the actions buttons into the on-screen buttons)
- Connectivity: 3G or Wifi (Required for the connecting to the N-Gage platform for downloading games, online functions such as rankings and multiplayer)
- CPU: ARM11 with speed ranges from 369 MHz (N81) to 600 MHz (E52)
- GPU: 3D Graphics Hardware Accelerator supported (games running on devices such as the HW-Accelerated N95 have enhanced performance)
- Audio: Stereo channel

=== Software development ===
N-Gage games are packaged differently than normal Symbian applications and have the extension ".n-gage" and can only run via the N-Gage application. The game resources are protected by DRM. They cannot use any native Symbian APIs, instead they use a proprietary API from the N-Gage SDK. N-Gage was also designed to make it easier for developers to port games to the platform: the SDK abstracts Symbian OS and provides a POSIX compliant, standard C/C++ layer over Symbian OS. This meant that developers no longer have to learn Symbian OS C++ idioms, like active objects and descriptors, before they can port their code. Hence it speeded up the process of porting to N-Gage as opposed to the original N-Gage hardware device.

The N-Gage API is in fact an extension of the RGA API available in the Open C++ plug-in. Only select companies were allowed access to the N-Gage SDK. To gain access they first must have been approved by Nokia and sign a NDA.

== Games library ==
As of 23 October 2009, there were 49 games released officially on the N-Gage service. Many other games were cancelled with the shutting down of N-Gage. Some of these games are sequels, remakes or ports of the first generation N-Gage MMC games.

Title	Release date	Developer	Publisher
Age of Empires III	28 April 2009	Ensemble Studios	Glu Mobile
AMF Bowling: Pinbusters!	17 June 2009	Eclipse Interactive	Vir2L Studios
Asphalt 4: Elite Racing	20 January 2009	Gameloft	Gameloft
Asphalt 3: Street Rules	3 April 2008	Gameloft	Gameloft
Block Breaker Deluxe	25 April 2008	Gameloft	Gameloft
Boom Blox	3 December 2008	IUGO Mobile	Electronic Arts
Bounce Boing Voyage	7 August 2008	Rovio Entertainment	Nokia Games Publishing
Brain Challenge	3 April 2008	Gameloft	Gameloft
Brothers in Arms	15 July 2008	Gameloft	Gameloft
Café Hold’ Em Poker	23 April 2009	Digital Chocolate	Digital Chocolate
Café Sudoku	27 January 2009	Digital Chocolate	Digital Chocolate
Café Solitaire 12-Pack	21 October 2008	Digital Chocolate	Digital Chocolate
Crash Bandicoot Nitro Kart 3D	22 December 2008	Polarbit	Vivendi Games Mobile
Dance Fabulous	9 June 2009	Digital Legends Entertainment	Nokia Games Publishing
Dirk Dagger and the Fallen Idol (Note: (original working title: Dirk Spanner and the Fallen Idol))	19 August 2008	Jadestone Group	Nokia Games Publishing
Dirk Dagger and the Nuclear Zeppelin	2 October 2009	Jadestone Group	Nokia Games Publishing
Dogz	25 August 2008	Gameloft	Gameloft
Ducati Moto	18 September 2009	Vir2L Studios	ZeniMax Europe
FIFA 08	7 April 2008	Gamelion	Electronic Arts
FIFA 09	18 November 2008	Electronic Arts	Electronic Arts
Guitar Hero World Tour	18 September 2009	Hands-On Mobile	Connect2Media
Hooked On: Creatures of the Deep	3 April 2008	Infinite Dreams	Nokia Games Publishing
Mega Monsters	23 October 2009	Firemint	Nokia Games Publishing
Metal Gear Solid Mobile	11 December 2008	Ideaworks3D	Konami Digital Entertainment
MONOPOLY Here & Now: The World Edition	3 March 2009	Venan Entertainment	Electronic Arts
Midnight Pool	27 June 2008	Gameloft	Gameloft
Mile High Pinball	6 May 2008	Ideaworks3D	Nokia Games Publishing
Million Dollar Poker	30 June 2009	Gameloft	Gameloft
Need for Speed Undercover	17 March 2009	IronMonkey Studios	Electronic Arts
ONE	28 October 2008	Digital Legends Entertainment	Nokia Games Publishing
Pandemonium	6 May 2009	Ideaworks3D	Eidos Interactive
Powerboat Challenge	23 October 2009	Fishlabs Entertainment	Fishlabs Entertainment
Prince of Persia	11 March 2009	Gameloft	Gameloft
Pro Series Golf	3 July 2008	Mineshaft Entertainment	Nokia Games Publishing
Real Football 2009	31 March 2009	Gameloft	Gameloft
Reset Generation	4 August 2008	RedLynx	Nokia Games Publishing
Resident Evil: Degeneration	18 December 2008	Ideaworks3D	Capcom
Snakes Subsonic	22 May 2008	Barking Lizards Technologies	Nokia Games Publishing
Space Impact: Kappa Base	19 April 2008	Method Solutions	Nokia Games Publishing
Spore Origins	20 May 2009	Polarbit	Electronic Arts
Star Wars: The Force Unleashed	16 September 2008	Universomo	THQ Wireless
System Rush: Evolution	3 April 2008	Ideaworks3D	Nokia Games Publishing
Tetris	25 April 2008	Electronic Arts	Electronic Arts
The Sims 2 Pets	18 June 2008	IronMonkey Studios	Electronic Arts
The Sims 3	14 July 2009	Electronic Arts	Electronic Arts
Tiger Woods PGA Tour	23 October 2009	Gamelion Studios	Electronic Arts
Tomb Raider Underworld	25 August 2009	Distinctive Developments	Electronic Arts / Eidos Interactive
World Series of Poker: Pro Challenge	3 April 2008	Glu Mobile	Glu Mobile
Worms World Party	7 April 2009	Codeglue / THQ Wireless	Team 17

=== Cancelled titles ===
Title	Developer / Publisher	Notes/Ref
Blades & Magic	Fishlabs	
Creebies	Gameware / Nokia Games Publishing	Game was announced in 2007 and previewed to the press, but never released on the platform. It was released in 2010 after N-Gage's closure.
Galaxy on Fire	Fishlabs	Was planned for 2010.
Habbo Island	Sulake	
Midnight Poker	Gameloft	
Pocket Aces: Texas Hold'Em	Bonus Mobile / Nokia Games Publishing	
Rally Master Pro	Fishlabs	
Shadow-Born	Backbone / Nokia Games Publishing	
Slam Slam Ping Pong!	Glu Mobile	
Snowboard Hero	Fishlabs	
Speed Racer	Glu Mobile	Based on the film of the same name.
Spirits	Jadestone Group	
Super Mahjong	I-play	
The Dark Knight	Glu Mobile	Based on the film of the same name.
Tin Star	? / Nokia Games Publishing	Remake of the original.
World Rally Championship	I-play	FIA WRC officially licensed.
Yamake	Gameware / Nokia Games Publishing	

=== Discover N-Gage ===
Discover N-Gage is a preview platform of N-Gage that built-in in early versions of firmware on N81, N82 and N95. This preview app features three playable demo N-Gage games, including two games that never release in N-Gage service: FIFA 07 by Electronic Arts and Space Impact: Light by Nokia (from the Space Impact series). Unlike the official N-Gage service, all three games were packed into a regular .sis application that can be installed and run on any S60v3 devices.

Title	Release date	Developer	Publisher	Notes/Ref
Asphalt 3: Street Rules	October 2007	Gameloft	Gameloft	The only preview game that later officially released in N-Gage service.
FIFA 07	October 2007	Gamelion	Electronic Arts	Appeared in preview app only, instead EA Sports released FIFA 08 and FIFA 09 in N-Gage service.
Space Impact: Light	October 2007	Method Solutions	Nokia Games Publishing	Appeared in preview app only, instead Nokia Games Publishing released Space Impact: Evolution in N-Gage service.

== See also ==
- Scalable Network Application Package (SNAP)
- Nokia Game
- Club Nokia
- Xbox Live
- Steam
- Game Center
