= Dance Fabulous =

2009 video game

- Developer: Digital Legends Entertainment
- Publisher: Nokia Games Publishing
- Composer: Dave Stewart
- Platform: N-Gage 2.0
- Release: 9 June 2009
- Genres: Music, rhythm

Dance Fabulous is a music and rhythm mobile game developed by Spanish studio Digital Legends and published by Nokia for the N-Gage 2.0 platform in 2009. It was the developer's second game on the platform other than the ONE sequel.

== Features ==
In Dance Fabulous, the player controls a cartoon-style character to dance to any song stored on the Nokia handset or to one of the purpose-made songs in the game. Unlike typical rhythm games, Dance Fabulous gives freedom for the player to dance however they would like, although there is a special mode called Challenge. Dance moves and choreography can be created within the game and could be shared with friends on the N-Gage Arena. A pre-made avatar of Cindy Gomez is available to be chosen. The game uses an achievements-based system for unlocking items to customise the player's own avatar.

== Development ==
Dance Fabulous was announced at a Nokia Games Summit in Rome on 29 October 2008. It was aimed to attract a mainstream and female audience to the N-Gage service while Nokia also aimed to cross tie it up with their Nokia Music Store service offered to customers. Nokia's Mark Ollila (not related to Jorma Ollila) oversaw the development of the game from start to finish. He claimed that the initial concept dated back to 2005 but was not green lit until two years later. Judson Laipply's "Evolution of Dance" video was referenced as a point that "just indicated that a dance game, where you dance, and not just pattern matching would be unique and new, particularly if it was to your own music."

The game was developed in collaboration with Dave Stewart of Eurythmics and his protege pop singer Cindy Gomez. Gomez provided her own moves that were motion captured in the game. At the time Gomez was considered an up-and-coming new artist who was active on MySpace, although she was not yet signed to her label Interscope Records when Nokia approached her Five songs from Gomez are featured in the game and Stewart himself co-produced original songs for the game. The flagship song of Dance Fabulous by the pair is called "Are You Out Of Your Mind?".

David Font, also known under the pseudonym synchrnzr, was the audio analysis researcher and programmer of the game.

The game was released in June 2009. Nokia offered an unprecedented free trial lasting 30 days. Mark Ollilla claimed that a touchscreen version of Dance Fabulous was in the works. It was released in China for the Nokia X6.

== Critical views ==
Dance Fabulous received several positive reviews. Nokia data also revealed that close to half the activity was coming from users in China. The Pocket Gamer website gave a review score of four out of five. After Nokia discontinued N-Gage 2.0, the publication wrote that Dance Fabulous was one of the stand-out games that were released on it.

Dance Fabulous was named Most Innovative Game at the 2009 Gamelab Awards held in Gijón, Spain.
