= Creebies =

2010 video game

- App icon
- Developer: Gameware Development
- Publisher: Nokia Games Publishing
- Producer: Lisa de Araujo
- Programmer: Jason Lander
- Artist: Neil Petitt
- Composers: Bob and Barn Ltd.
- Platforms: Symbian (S60v3 and later)
- Release: 26 March 2010
- Genres: Life simulation, Virtual pet

Creebies is a life simulation and virtual pet mobile game for Symbian. It was developed by British studio Gameware and was published by Nokia on the Ovi Store in 2010. The game is based around raising, customising and breeding autonomous alien pets, each of which is called a "Creebi".

== Premise ==
Creebies is a 3D virtual pet game. The player starts with some virtual cash and a trailer home to customise their Creebi from birth with a choice of four different species each with differing characteristics. The autonomous pet would grow its own personality and appearance based on the attention it receives on the player, requiring the player to remain attentive to its health meters to keep the Creebi happy and guide objects in the world to it to learn and grow independent.

== Features ==
Rather than interacting with the pet itself, in Creebies the player controls the 3D world to pick and choose elements that the autonomous Creebi would consume. Objects within the game include clothing, toys and accessories. Creebies features four different themed islands, namely Happi, Gobi, Creepi and Blobbi, with each world having its own range of shops.

Alongside these are a range of minigames featured throughout the world that the player can play with their Creebi pet or alone. In a homage to Nokia there is also a Snake minigame. Playing and winning these minigames are among the activities that earns the player Spondoolies, the fictional in-game currency. The Spondoolies are also a driving factor to successfully breed Creebi together through buying items to influence their personality.

Creebies in the world also interact with each other and may get on or dislike each other depending on their characteristics. When two Creebies really like each other, partly encouraged by the player's gameplay, they could get together and have a baby Creebie and a DNA would determine the child's own appearance and character as a mix of the parents. Two Creebi of the same species and breed are most likely to like each other, but those of different breeds may also warm up to each other depending on the player's actions to increase their compatibility. According to Gameware, the game features "fully morphable models" intended to be able to create an infinite variety of characters.

== Development ==
The game was first previewed on 29 August 2007 at Nokia's Go Play event (along with Dirk Spanner (later released as Dirk Dagger and the Fallen Idol and Play. Make. Share. (later renamed to Yamake and unreleased)) to showcase the capabilities of their upcoming N-Gage 2.0 platform. The game was announced and made official on 13 December 2007 with Nokia announcing that the game was going to be released in early 2008 in line with the launch of the N-Gage service.

Creebies was developed by Gameware, the Cambridge-based company that were already involved with a similar life simulator in the Creatures series which they purchased in 2003. The core team from Creatures was involved in the creation of Creebies.

According to the game's producer and lead designer, Lisa de Araujo, the initial concept of the game from Nokia was aimed to be a virtual pet game for young girls in an attempt to attract female gamers to the N-Gage platform. Realising that the game may not sell well to this audience on high-end gaming devices, Gameware made changes to the look and feel to slightly expand its audience: de Araujo said "We also decided to give the Creebies a range of personality types that might broaden the appeal as well, so you'll find physical sporty Creebies, intelligent geeky Creebies, cute girly Creebies and a strangely normal species." Neopets and Creatures were cited by de Araujo as the two biggest influences for Creebies, citing Neopets's "addictive" minigames and it earning the player in-game money.

Neil Petitt was the lead artist. De Araujo claims that her brief to the team was: "'Retro, '70s, acid-trip colouring'. Characters are weirdy freaks, but their environment is 'Telly Tubbies on LSD', a little bit Jetsons, a little bit Barbarella with trippy topiary."

As part of the N-Gage 2.0 platform, Creebies was planned to work with N-Gage Arena for online multiplayer of its minigames. The feature was also going to be available locally via Bluetooth connection. Creebies failed to release as expected in 2008, and on 2 November 2009 Nokia announced that the N-Gage games service will shut down.

The game was eventually released onto the Ovi Store in March 2010, with additional support for touchscreen (S60 5th Edition) handsets, in seven languages including English. However no multiplayer feature of any kind was implemented in the final release of the game. It was quoted at the time that the game was set to be a Nokia exclusive for six months after which it could appear on other mobile platforms. This evidently did not materialise.

== Critical views ==
When first announced the game had comparisons made with the Nintendogs video game from Nintendo and the virtual world of the Teletubbies TV series by the BBC. Softpedia were among those that directly compared it to the Tamagotchi virtual pet by Bandai. Creebies was later also described by Pocket Gamer as "Neopets meets Animal Crossing". Pocket Gamer ranked the game at number 3 in the list of most anticipated mobile games of 2008, behind Nokia's Reset Generation and THQ's Star Wars: The Force Unleashed.

After release, the website All About Symbian scored the game highly with a comment of "Thoroughly recommended."
