= Cindy Gomez =

Canadian musician, actress and model

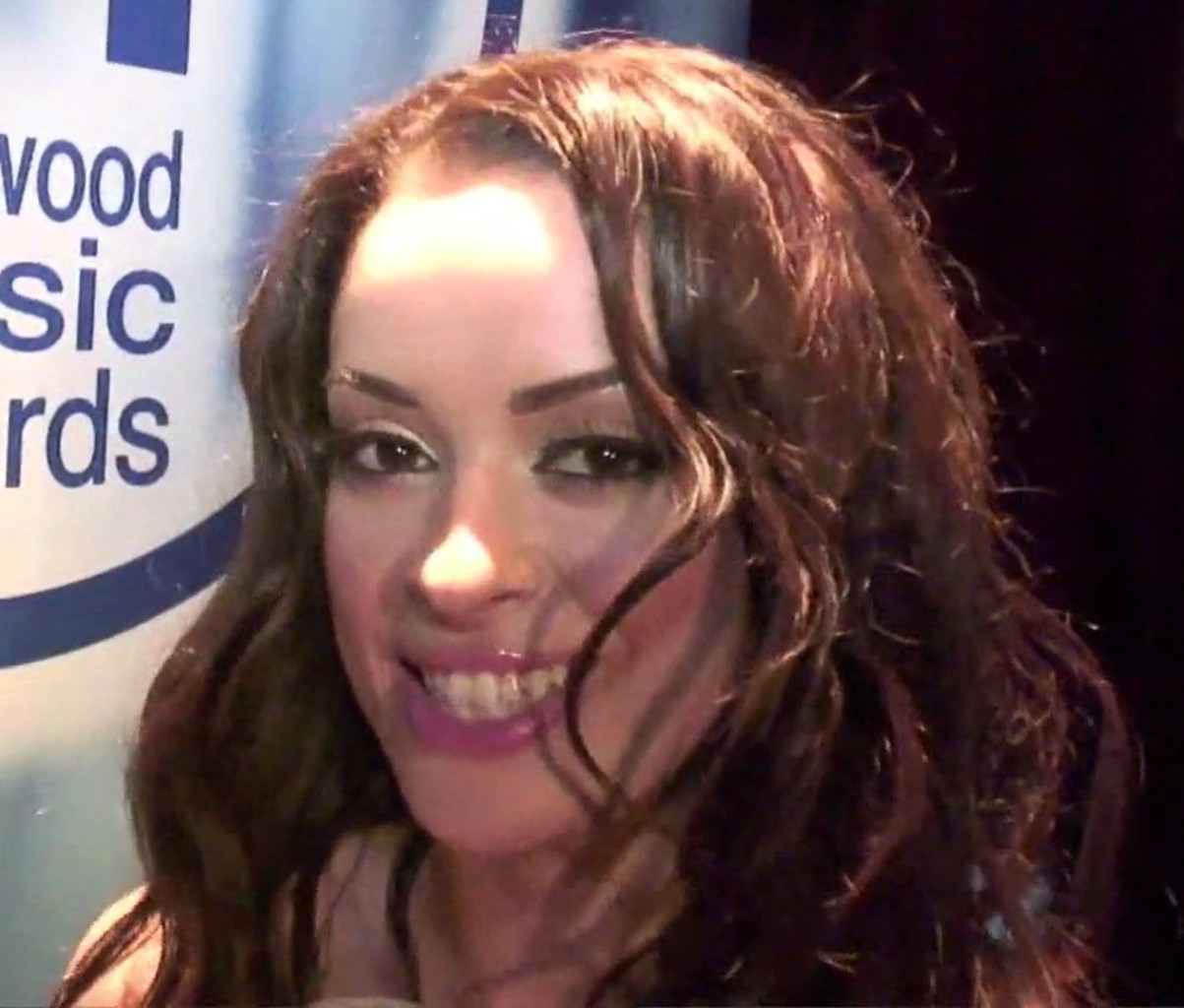
- Gomez in 2008

Background information
- Origin: Mississauga, Ontario, Canada
- Genres: Pop music, electronic dance music, rock, adult contemporary, latin pop
- Occupations: Musician, singer-songwriter
- Instrument: Vocals
- Labels: Interscope Records, Universal Music Group
- Website: cindygomez.com

Cindy Gomez is a singer, songwriter, actress and model who grew up in Mississauga, Ontario, Canada. She is of Colombian and Belgian descent and can sing in 8 languages: English, French, Spanish, Italian, Latin, Hindi, Cantonese and Mandarin.

== Career ==
Gomez began singing at the age of eight. In order to create opportunities and get noticed, she began modeling and entered a Miss Latin America pageant in Canada. Winning the pageant opened the doors to Spanish and multicultural radio and television stations in Toronto and various performances such as Super Latin Fest at the Canadian National Exhibition and Telelatino LatinFest at Canada's Wonderland.

In 2002, Gomez's vocals were featured in the electronic dance song "Pounding Your Soul" released on Roger Sanchez's album Release Yourself Ibiza (2002) by Stealth Records and she got her first movie role in Left Behind II: Tribulation Force, where she played the Angelic Woman alongside Kirk Cameron and Brad Johnson and sang "Amazing Grace".

In 2003, Gomez sang the official theme song "Time Only Knows", for the soundtrack and video game of Prince of Persia: The Sands of Time, developed by Ubisoft Montreal and composed by Stuart Chatwood. "Time Only Knows" has become an all-time favorite within the gaming community.

=== Breakthrough ===
Gomez's big break came in January 2008 when she received a phone call from producer Michael Bradford to perform with Ringo Starr on Larry King Live, The Late Late Show with Craig Ferguson, and at the House of Blues. In the CNN green room she met producer and songwriter Dave Stewart, best known for his fame in Eurythmics. Stewart had been scheduled to perform with Starr on the Larry King show, featuring a song they had co-written, "Liverpool 8". One of the female backup singers took ill, and Gomez was recommended by the band's bass player. Stewart was impressed with Gomez' performance. After being invited to his then shared studio with songwriter and record producer Glen Ballard to sing on a demo for what was to be the worldwide success Ghost the Musical, an adaptation from Ghost starring Patrick Swayze and Demi Moore; they told her to move to Los Angeles and they began working on original tracks for her first album

"She's sultry and sexy, but also a real performer who's in control. She's a real singer, and a real songwriter with a knack for huge melodies. Her determination and ethic reminds me of Beyoncé or Madonna.

— Dave Stewart

In 2008, Gomez became part of Dave Stewart's 30-piece Rock Fabulous Orchestra performing on his album Dave Stewart Songbook, Vol. 1 as background vocalist and lead vocalist on "Underneath it All" (originally performed by No Doubt) and "Jealous" (originally performed by Sinéad O'Connor) as well as live shows in Las Vegas, Los Angeles and abroad. Gomez also sang and appeared in Stewart's celebrity-studded video for American Prayer a song he co-wrote with Bono for Barack Obama.

=== 2009–2013 ===
Gomez signed her first record deal with Interscope Records worldwide and Universal Music Group for Canada in 2009 when Dave Stewart introduced her to his longtime friend Jimmy Iovine, founder of Interscope Geffen A&M.

In 2009, Gomez became the first artist to make her debut in a mobile game, Dance Fabulous on N-Gage by Nokia. The game included a dancing Gomez avatar and five of her songs, which positioned her at the forefront of a trend that marries music with mobile entertainment.

In April 2009, Gomez went on a European tour to promote the Dance Fabulous video game. She also appeared in Vienna for Life Ball, Europe's largest AIDS-related charity event, where she performed a new song that she and Stewart co-wrote and donated called "I Bring You Love", to a live audience of 70,000 which was also broadcast live throughout Europe at the opening Ceremony.

In October 2009, Gomez's image was on the Flip brand video recorder for the charity Red line co-founded by Bono.

Gomez's backing vocals can be heard on Ringo Starr's album Y Not released in 2010, on the songs "The Other Side of Liverpool" and "Time".

On 15 July 2011, the electronic dance music song "Pounding Your Soul" that Cindy Gomez sang and was released in 2002 was re-released on the album This Is Afrodelic Vol.3 – 25 Afro Tribal House Tunes Various Artists by Guajira Recordings.

Gomez released her first Spanish EP called Fuego Fatal composed of five songs; one of which was written by Shakira and Dave Stewart on 30 April 2012.

=== 2014–present ===
On 17 March 2014, Gomez released a song she sang and co-wrote called "We Love Who We Love", based on the true tragic story of a young boy named Ryan. She shares more of her thoughts on life as a singer online.

== Television ==
Gomez is part of the fourth season of Fox International Channels TV show and first Celebrity Edition of The Apartment - Design Your Destiny, produced by Imagine Group and airing 25 January 2015 on Starworld and Fox International Channels throughout Asia

== Discography ==
=== Singles ===
- Again & Again (2009)
- I got You (2014)
- Home Sweet Home (2015)
- We Love who We love (2015)
- Adicta Al Amor (2017)
- Uber den Wolken (2019)
- Legendary (2020)
- Spilled Milk (2021)
- Otro Paso Mas (2022)

=== EPs ===
- Fuego Fatal (2014)
- Spilled Milk: The Remixes (2021)
