= Colin McRae Rally 2005 =

2004 video game

- European cover art, featuring a Subaru Impreza
- Developer: Codemasters (Note: N-Gage version developed by Ideaworks3D; J2ME version developed by I-Play; PlayStation Portable version developed by Six by Nine; Mac OS X version developed by Robosoft Technologies.)
- Publishers: Codemasters; N-Gage; Nokia; Mac OS X Feral Interactive
- Series: Colin McRae Rally
- Platforms: PlayStation 2; Windows; Xbox; N-Gage; J2ME; PlayStation Portable; Mac OS X
- Release: 24 September 2004: PlayStation 2; PAL: 24 September 2004 Windows; PAL: 24 September 2004; NA: 28 October 2004 Xbox; PAL: 24 September 2004; NA: 28 September 2004 N-Gage; EU: 5 November 2004; NA: 29 November 2004 J2ME; WW: 22 November 2004 PlayStation Portable; EU: 1 September 2005; AU: 23 September 2005; JP: 14 June 2007 Mac OS X; NA: 26 October 2007
- Genre: Racing
- Modes: Single-player, multiplayer

Colin McRae Rally 2005 is a 2004 racing video game developed and published by Codemasters.

== Gameplay ==
As with previous games in the series, Colin McRae Rally 2005 is presented as a realistic rally simulation, with players participating in rallies consisting of 70 stages spread over nine countries. There are over 30 cars available. There is also a revised graphics and damage engine that enables paint scratches on the car, and a new "career" mode where the player starts out in the lower club leagues and works their way up to compete with Colin McRae in his 2004 Dakar Rally Nissan Pick-Up. In "championship" mode, the player takes the role of Colin himself, competing in six rallies using any 4WD car. The game's graphic engine allows for more realistic damage effects, like broken glass and doors falling off, and a blurred vision effect if the player comes into contact with a hard object. The damage system has similarities to the Destruction Derby one, as a damaged radiator will stall the car and make it need to restart the engine. A slight level of customisation is the ability to put your name and nationality on the window.

The game also features online multiplayer on both the PlayStation 2 and Xbox. In line with other online-enabled games on the Xbox, multiplayer on Xbox Live was available to players until 15 April 2010. Colin McRae Rally 2005 is now playable online again on the replacement Xbox Live servers called Insignia.

A Mac OS X version of this game, renamed as Colin McRae Rally Mac, was published by Feral Interactive and developed by Robosoft Technologies, marking the first game in the series for Mac OS X. It was released on 26 October 2007, just six weeks after McRae's death in a helicopter crash. The development of the game was fraught with problems. Apple's switch to Intel Macs, some behind-the-scenes changes at Feral and other issues conspired to keep Colin McRae Rally Mac from being released until fairly late into 2007, despite it being based on PC-game underpinnings that Windows gamers had been enjoying since late 2004. Feral chose to make this release as independent of the PC franchise as possible to avoid any issues that might date it, calling it Colin McRae Rally Mac rather than attaching a year to it. Two mobile phone versions of this game were created: a N-Gage version developed by Ideaworks3D and a J2ME version developed by IOMO and published by Digital Bridges. The N-Gage version reused stages from Colin McRae Rally 2.0. Both were nominated for BAFTAs in the Mobile and Handheld categories respectively. The PlayStation Portable version was ported to Japan under the name Colin McRae Rally (コリン・マクレー ラリー, Korin Makurē Rarī) and published by Interchannel-Holon on 14 June 2007.

== Reception ==
Reception

Aggregate scores
Aggregator	Score					
Aggregator	mobile	N-Gage	PC	PS2	PSP	Xbox
GameRankings	74%	84%	82%	84%	72%	84%
Metacritic	N/A	83/100	83/100	80/100	72/100	83/100

Review scores
Publication	Score					
Publication	mobile	N-Gage	PC	PS2	PSP	Xbox
Edge	N/A	N/A	6/10	6/10	N/A	6/10
Electronic Gaming Monthly	N/A	8/10	N/A	N/A	N/A	N/A
Eurogamer	N/A	N/A	N/A	N/A	N/A	8/10
Game Informer	N/A	N/A	N/A	N/A	N/A	8.25/10
GamePro	N/A	N/A	N/A	N/A	N/A	4.5/5
GameSpot	6/10	8.3/10	8.3/10	N/A	N/A	8.6/10
GameSpy	N/A	4/5	4.5/5	N/A	N/A	4/5
GameZone	N/A	8.2/10	N/A	N/A	N/A	9.2/10
IGN	6.1/10	N/A	9.1/10	N/A	N/A	9.1/10
PlayStation Official Magazine – UK	N/A	N/A	N/A	9/10	N/A	N/A
Official Xbox Magazine (US)	N/A	N/A	N/A	N/A	N/A	8.5/10
PALGN	N/A	N/A	N/A	8/10	6.5/10	N/A
PC Gamer (US)	N/A	N/A	73%	N/A	N/A	N/A
VideoGamer.com	N/A	N/A	N/A	N/A	6/10	N/A
BBC Sport	N/A	N/A	N/A	90%	N/A	90%
The Sydney Morning Herald	N/A	N/A	3.5/5	3.5/5	N/A	3.5/5

Colin McRae Rally 2005 received "favourable" reviews on all platforms except the PSP version, which received "average" reviews, according to the review aggregation website Metacritic. GameSpot named Colin McRae Rally 2005 the best N-Gage game of 2004. It received a runner-up position in the publication's annual "Best Driving Game" award category across all platforms, losing to Burnout 3: Takedown.

Macworld editor Peter Cohen gave the Mac OS X port four out of five stars, praising the variety of vehicles, courses, and game modes to choose from. Cohen also praised the graphics and sound effects as "top notch". Mild criticism was noted relating to online play.
