= Marmalade (software) =

Cross-platform software development kit and game engine

Marmalade SDK
- Developer: Marmalade Technologies Limited.
- Stable release: 8.6 / September 15, 2016; 10 years ago
- Written in: C++
- Operating system: iOS, Android, Windows Phone 8, Mac OS X, Windows, Tizen, Roku, NetCast
- Type: Game engine
- License: Proprietary
- Website: Official website

Marmalade SDK was a cross-platform software development kit and game engine from Marmalade Technologies Limited (previously known as Ideaworks3D Limited) that contains library files, samples, documentation and tools required to develop, test and deploy applications for mobile devices.

== Overview ==
The underlying concept of the Marmalade SDK is write once, run anywhere so that a single codebase can be compiled and executed on all supported platforms rather than needing to be written in different programming languages using a different API for each platform. This is achieved by providing a C/C++ based API which acts as an abstraction layer for the core API of each platform.

Depending on the license purchased, Marmalade SDK supports deployment of applications to the following platforms: Android, BlackBerry 10, iOS, LG Smart TV, Tizen, Mac OS X, Windows Desktop, Roku 2, Roku 3, and Windows Phone 8, but not Linux.

The main Marmalade SDK consists of two main layers. A low level C API called Marmalade System provides an abstraction layer that allows a programmer access to device functionality such as memory management, file access, timers, networking, input methods (e.g. accelerometer, keyboard, touch screen) and sound and video output. Marmalade SDK is a C++ API that provides higher level functionality mostly focused on support for 2D (e.g. bitmap handling, fonts) and 3D graphics rendering (e.g. 3D mesh rendering, boned animation). It includes an extensible resource management system and HTTP networking. Marmalade SDK supports Objective C.

Marmalade SDK allows access to the graphics rendering capabilities of mobile devices either by using the OpenGL ES API directly (both OpenGL ES 1.x and 2.x are supported) or by using the functionality provided by the Marmalade SDK layer. Marmalade SDK provides support for loading and rendering graphics resources such as bitmap images and 3D model data which would need to be implemented by the user if using OpenGL ES directly. Marmalade SDK provides exporter plug-ins for use with Autodesk 3DS Max and Autodesk Maya to allow 3D models and animations to be used in applications. For supporting older devices with no dedicated rendering hardware, a legacy software based rendering option is provided. On 9 October 2015, Marmalade introduced its own 2D and 3D authoring tools.

Marmalade Technologies Limited formerly Ideaworks Ltd, the maker of the 2D/3D Marmalade SDK announced in September 2016 the ceasing of production and support of its Marmalade Game Platform, choosing instead to focus on the output of its own game studio known as Marmalade Game Studio Ltd. The company announced that after the final iteration in March 2017 the licence server will be turned off and support will cease. In January 2017 GMO Cloud– based in Japan obtains the exclusive rights to use the Marmalade SDK which supports both native and hybrid browser-based apps, accelerating the development of new features and supporting game and app development.

In May 2018, GMO Cloud announced the discontinuation of Marmalade.

== Reception ==
On November 12, 2015, the Marmalade Platform won at The Independent Game Developers' Association Awards 2015 in the category of "Best Engines & Middleware, Tools & Tech".

== Games ==
This is a list of notable games which had been built using the Marmalade SDK.

- Angry Birds POP!
- Backbreaker
- Call of Duty: World at War: Zombies
- Doodle Jump
- Draw Something
- Godus
- Lara Croft and the Guardian of Light
- Metal Gear Solid Mobile
- Need for Speed: Shift
- Peggle
- Plants vs. Zombies
- Pro Evolution Soccer games
- SimCity Build It
- Tetris
- Worms
- Eternium
- Creature Quest
- Expendable:Rearmed
- Blur Overdrive

Marmalade's in house game development is through Marmalade Game Studio Ltd. and publish the following games:

- Cluedo
- The Game of Life
- Spinguins
- RIZE: Zombies
- Sudoku 4Two Multiplayer
