= One (2005 video game) =

2005 video game

ONE
- Developer: Digital Legends
- Publisher: Nokia
- Director: Xavier Carrillo-Costa
- Designer: Oscar Escamilla Pérez
- Programmer: Ángel Cuñado Pérez
- Platform: N-Gage Classic
- Release: NA: October 13, 2005; EU: October 14, 2005
- Genre: Fighting
- Modes: Single player, Multiplayer

ONE is a fighting game for the classic N-Gage released in 2005. It was developed by Spanish studio Digital Legends and published by Nokia as one of their internal games for their platform.

== Features ==
In ONE, the player has to fight opponents in a 3D environment. It is set in many real-world locations such as Mexico City, Los Angeles and Jamaica. The fighting styles are based on martial arts discipline Jeet Kune Do. Multiplayer via Bluetooth is also supported and players could formerly also share their scores on N-Gage Arena.

== Development ==
ONE was announced by Nokia at E3 2005. The company claimed that the game was close to finish and was only waiting for the distribution process. Digital Legends claims that ONE was the first ever game for a mobile device to utilise motion capture.

== Reception ==
Reception

Aggregate score
Aggregator	Score
Metacritic	72/100

Review scores
Publication	Score
GameSpot	6.6/10
GameSpy	3.5/5
IGN	8/10

The game received "average" reviews according to the review aggregation website Metacritic. Despite the mixed reviews, the Academy of Interactive Arts & Sciences nominated One for "Cellular Game of the Year" during the 9th Annual Interactive Achievement Awards.

== Sequel ==
At E3 2006, Nokia showcased a next generation sequel titled ONE - Who's Next? for their N-Gage 2.0 preview. Fans often unofficially referred to the game as "ONE Sequel". It was released for the new N-Gage service on 28 October 2008 under the simple title of ONE.
