= Nokia Game =

Series of alternate reality games (1999-2005)

- Creator: Human-i Euro RSCG
- Publisher: Nokia
- First release: 1999
- Latest release: 2005

Related media
- Alternate reality games

The Nokia Game was a series of alternate reality games (ARGs) produced by Human-i Euro RSCG for Nokia. The concept was developed by Joost van Liemt and Sicco Beerda. Although mainly a competition through which Nokia promotes their latest phones, it is a true ARG which fuses various forms of mass media, promotes communication between players, and features involving storylines which change every year.

The original Nokia Game first took place in August 1999, and was only open to residents in the Netherlands. In November 2000, Nokia started offering the experience in 18 countries in Europe. The Nokia Game in November 2001 took place in 28 countries across the Europe and the Middle East, with more than 600,000 players participating, according to Nokia.

The 2005 edition was open to participants in more than 20 countries. Although notorious for the frequent bugs and crashes experienced during the Europe-wide live finals, the games were very popular. Nokia has not produced any games since the year of 2006.

== The Games ==
=== 1999: The Nokia Ultimate Connection Game ===
The very first Nokia Game was only open to residents in the Netherlands, and centred round a young boy called Sisu, who is taken to hospital after a serious snowboarding accident. From there on it was up to the player to discover what had happened to him, and what to do next. It was a true Alternate Reality Game, with hidden clues in phone calls, magazines and TV adverts. Some sections even required players to phone each other to discover their usernames. Many games in this edition were also under a strict time limit, and failing the game once meant being instantly eliminated.

=== 2000: Sisu & Mika ===
Following criticism of the previous game for being too hard, the 2000 edition not only allowed people from more countries to play, but was also more lenient during eliminations – players could usually practice games for as long as they liked, but could only "play" the games once.

The story centred on Sisu, a man taken into hospital after being poisoned in an ice cream parlour. Once conscious again, the player has to piece together what happened from clues left behind at the scene, eyewitnesses and a mysterious young boy called Mika, who claims to know a lot about Sisu and his past. The story was very mysterious, with many plot twists. Although future Nokia Games had a bigger audience, they lacked the secrecy and mystery present in the first two.

=== 2001: The Tone ===
This Nokia Game was open to residents in the UK and most of mainland Europe. It was also the first game to be widely publicised on TV, radio, print and at live events.

The first contact with the game happened 2 weeks before the advertised start of the game, with pre-registered players receiving a phone call from the mysterious "Geneva", begging the player to watch a certain TV channel at a certain time. At the time given by Geneva, a television advert placed by Nokia was played. This explained the story so far: a strange blue light ("The Tone") has embedded itself in the bodies of a group of skateboarders, who have been found and captured by an unknown organisation. Only one boarder managed to escape. We learn her name is Alpha when, in the advert, she receives the same phone call all the players received previously. The address of the first challenge then appeared on the screen, warning players to complete the challenge before the 3-day deadline or risk dropping out of the game.

What followed was mainly a series of Internet-based Flash games, which tested abilities such as memorisation, note-making, decision-making, skill and research. One memorable section of the game, "Tunnel", involved a maze of tunnels which had to be navigated in real-time. In order to complete the game in time, many players had to wake up in the middle of the night in order to make their crucial last move before the deadline. Hints, important information, and phone numbers needed to progress in the game were featured as radio adverts, newspaper classified ads (featuring fake phone companies which were used to instantly transport the player to another area of the "Tunnel" maze), further TV adverts and even a full-page article on national newspapers (featuring a photo of Alpha, the player, with the caption, "Have You Seen This Woman?").

The live final was scheduled to take place simultaneously around Europe, and was divided into three sections: a Snake mini-game, a navigation game (which required a map previously printed in a national newspaper), and a quiz section relating to the game's story. Unfortunately for players who did not complete the Snake mini-game within the allotted 15 minutes, the sheer number of requests to the game's server meant the entire site crashed and remained offline for half an hour before emergency SMSs were sent to all players instructing them to log in again and resume the game with an extended time limit.

The game was considered popular and is remembered by the storyline and sense of reality.

=== 2002: MusicWorld ===
The 2002 game took players by surprise as it transpired that there would not be an involving storyline, but rather a main stock-trading game in a fictional "MusicWorld", with mini-games included every week in order to rack up extra points. The 2002 game also did not feature any TV clues, only advertising for the game. However, every few days the Nokia Game team would appear in a certain, pre-announced European city and ask the winners of the previous game to help them roll 2 inflatable dice, which would cause a positive or negative effect on the game. The dice rolls, as well as the introductory films, were available for download from the Nokia Game web site.

A lot of emphasis was placed on the "community" in the 2002 game. For example, players could design small logos or "tags" which would be placed on random billboards throughout MusicWorld. Players could then vote for the best tags. Similarly, players could compose short songs using a Flash editor. As the game also featured running around in a virtual 3D world (similar to the "Tunnels" in the 2001 NokiaGame) in order to buy the needed "assets" at different locations, players were stimulated to exchange information in order to generate a complete map of MusicWorld, thus really "connecting people". This was also the first game with a "leaderboard" – giving players a rough idea of what position they were in.

The 2002 Nokia was also used to promote the then-new music group Kosheen. A section of their song, "Harder", could be heard from all parts of the Music City. This was then turned into an in-joke at the end of the game, when players who just fell short of the required number of points to win were jokingly told "You... should have tried... a little bit harder", mimicking the song's lyrics.

=== 2003: AnyOne ===
The game started mysteriously, turning back to the old style of games with an actual, progressive plot. The big innovation this year was the introduction of real-time head-to-head competitive games, alongside the release of a free snowboarding game (FloBoard) for Nokia Series 60 phones. This was also the first game that actively tried to get players to co-operate, with PC and mobile chat programs, and live leaderboards. The downloadable application for phones also had an artificial intelligence program that enabled the player to chat to and extrapolate clues from the main character, Flo.

Each week featured two challenges: a snowboarding track to be completed in the least amount of time possible (the tracks were identical on the mobile phone version, allowing players to practice anywhere), and a "show-down" against one of the members of the AnyOne organisation, responsible for stealing Flo's phone at the start of the story. These were Java games that required two people to play. The player would always see the opposing player as the "enemy", the member of AnyOne that had to be beaten.

Although this edition of the Nokia Game necessitated more skill than logic, it was well-received for not forcing players to play within very strict time limits, but also criticised for its frequent bugs and players who would often disconnect while losing. This was partly rectified by awarding more points to players with a higher number of consecutive plays.

=== 2005: 20 Lives ===
It is disputed whether or not the 2005 game was actually a Nokia Game – it carried the Nokia Game logo, yet was not on the nokiagame.com website. A "thank you" video posted on the 20 Lives website also clearly shows that Nokia believes the Nokia Game ran from 1999 to 2003, excluding 20 Lives from being a Nokia Game. However, it shared many similarities with previous games.

The premise for 20 Lives was that the player was a contestant on a gameshow in which he or she could become a completely different person every day. The player would have 24 hours to make their new life a success or failure by making three crucial decisions during the "life".

Two old Nokia Game staples were brought back for 20 Lives – the need to take notes about every part of the game (since the Final involved questions about all the past lives), and the "one chance" game, where unless you closed your browser before reaching the end of the life, that life's success or failure status would be permanent, without the chance to try again. Contestants would also sometimes receive text messages or fake voice calls giving them information on how to beat certain lives, but without giving away too much information. It was more of a way to keep contestants interested than to give clues.

== Prizes ==
The Nokia Game, being essentially a marketing campaign for Nokia, of course offered big prizes. The number of prizes depended on the country, with some countries maybe receiving only a handful (such as Greece or Turkey), and some receiving over 100 prizes (such as the United Kingdom). Generally speaking, the top 50-100 players in each country were guaranteed to receive a prize.

The prize would usually consist of Nokia's latest mobile phone, which would be shipped to Nokia Game winners before the phones arrived in shops, thereby enabling the game's players to test and promote the phones on Nokia's behalf. The mobile phones on offer were usually very expensive (such as 2002's game offering Nokia 3650s and 2003's offering N-Gages). This was offset by the sheer amount of time needed to play and win the game during its 3-4 week period.
