= Shade: Wrath of Angels =

2004 video game

- Developer: Black Element Software
- Publishers: Cenega Publishing; Tri Synergy
- Designers: Josef Vlach; Rudolf Snížek; Jan Zámečník; Aleš Horák; Radek Volf
- Programmers: Filip Doksanský; Andrej Török
- Artists: Jan Zámečník; Aleš Horák; Jiří Bartoněk; Jiří Růžicka
- Composer: Jaroslav Kašný
- Engine: Enforce
- Platform: Microsoft Windows
- Release: EU/NA: 1 October 2004
- Genre: Action-adventure
- Mode: Single-player

Shade: Wrath of Angels (Czech: Shade: Hněv andělů; originally called Nefandus) is a 2004 action-adventure video game for Microsoft Windows, developed by Black Element Software and published by Cenega. The game's story revolves around an ancient war between angels and gods. A Nokia N-Gage version was planned, but never released.

== Gameplay ==
Shade: Wrath of Angels is a third-person RPG offering over 30 hours of playtime. The gameplay features action/adventure and exploration elements. The game consists of four chapters spanning different historical eras and alternate dimensions, divided into thirty levels (tutorial included). In battle, the protagonist has the ability to wield melee and ranged weapons and cast spells against twenty unique types of enemies. The protagonist is also able to assume a demonic form for a limited period of time. The protagonist's health and magical power can be upgraded by collecting golden drops, which are hidden throughout the game.

== Plot ==
The game follows an unnamed male protagonist, who receives a letter from his estranged brother, 'B'. In it, B claims to have discovered an important archaeological site somewhere in Europe, which appears to be ancient. However, upon arriving at the town indicated in the letter, the protagonist finds it completely deserted. He makes his way to the hotel where B was staying at; a note left behind by B directs him to a nearby church. Armed with a pistol, the protagonist encounters zombies, and also starts seeing visions of fire and demonic creatures.

At the church, the protagonist descends into the crypt below, which contains the archaeological site. The protagonist finds no trace of his brother, but discovers a mysterious orb, which he picks up. A figure engulfed in mist appears in front of him, introducing itself as the Angel of Faith, one of Holy Four - a group of angels deposed by the ancient gods who feared their combined power. The angel explains that the orb is, in fact, its heart, and tasks the protagonist with releasing the other three angels, trapped in parallel worlds they each once ruled over. In return, the angel promises to bring back B, who has fallen under the curse of the gods; it also states that B has initiated the ritual of merging the four worlds together, and is therefore the only one who can complete it. Indifferent to the angel's revelations, but willing to do anything to save his brother, the protagonist agrees to do as told. To aid him in his quest, the angel assigns him a demonic servant, and also grants him an enchanted sword.

Guided by the Angel of Faith, the protagonist uses an ancient monolith called Nefandus to enter each of the parallel worlds, where he locates the hearts of the other three angels. The three worlds are as follows:

- A world themed after Medieval Europe, inhabited by undead soldiers and knights. The protagonist explores a ruined castle of a Gnostic military order and a spider-infested necropolis, and acquires the heart of the Angel of Blood.
- A world themed after Ancient Egypt, inhabited by reanimated mummies, giant scorpions and undead worshipers of the god Set. The protagonist explores an underground temple and the realm of the dead, and acquires the heart of the Angel of Soul.
- A world of eternal darkness referred to as the Shadowland, inhabited by dead souls and evil creatures. The protagonist traverses a fog-covered swamp and a large mechanical complex, and acquires the heart of the Angel of Death.

After the protagonist collects the three hearts, the Angel of Faith appears before him, revealing its true, horrifying form. The Holy Four turn out to be fallen angels, who opposed the ancient gods in the past and were punished for initiating a war between the four worlds. Awoken from its slumber by B, the Angel of Faith killed him and then tricked the protagonist into retrieving the hearts – not to release the other three angels, but to claim their power for itself. Angered by the betrayal, the protagonist determines to destroy the hearts. The Angel of Faith orders its demonic servant to attack the protagonist, but he slays the demon using the enchanted sword.

The other three angels, their power restored, appear and seemingly banish the Angel of Faith. A different ending is shown, based on which mutually exclusive upgrades the player picked at preset points during the course of the game. If the player opted to strengthen the demon, the angels transform the protagonist into an ethereal guardian, tasked with protecting the four hearts until the Judgement Day. However, if the player opted to strengthen the enhanced sword, the protagonist defiantly throws the sword at Nefandus, destroying the monolith (and, possibly, the four angels). He finds himself back aboard the train he originally arrived on, only this time he is met by B at the train station.

== Reception ==
Reception

Aggregate scores
Aggregator	Score
GameRankings	52.62%
Metacritic	50/100

The game received mostly mixed reviews. It currently holds a 50/100 score at Metacritic based on 12 reviews.
