= System Rush =

2005 video game

- Developer(s): Ideaworks Game Studio
- Publisher(s): Nokia
- Platform(s): N-Gage
- Release: NA: September 2005; EU: September 22, 2005
- Genre(s): racing game
- Mode(s): Single-player, multiplayer

System Rush is a 2005 futuristic racing game published by Nokia and developed by Ideaworks Game Studio for the N-Gage.

== Story ==
In a world controlled by corporations, information is everything. Knowing that your competitors' secrets is the only way to get an edge in the cutthroat arena of corporate dominance. In this information age, warfare is carried out by "black hat" (morally corrupt) hackers who have become electronic gladiators for their boardroom puppet masters.

You are a "white hat" hacker on the verge of being framed for a high-profile global cyber-crime. Your sophisticated program, designed to cleanse any network of malicious hacker activity, has been stolen by black hat hackers on the payroll of Globenet. A network of unscrupulous corporations. This evil alliance intends to use your code as a "logic bomb" to bring down rival corporations.

Your only chance at clearing your name is to infiltrate Globenet, steal back your code and expose the conspiracy.

== Features ==
System Rush can be played both as a single-player game and in a multi-player mode, using either N-Gage Arena or a local Bluetooth connection. As of December 2007 the Arena functions are now defunct.

== Developments ==
System Rush was an original concept by Ideaworks Game Studio who also developed the game.

== Reception ==
Reception

Aggregate score
Aggregator	Score
Metacritic	80/100

Review scores
Publication	Score
IGN	8.2/10
VideoGamer.com	7/10

The game received "favorable" reviews according to the review aggregation website Metacritic.

== Sequel ==
Nokia released the follow-up System Rush: Evolution, which was also developed by Ideaworks Game Studio on the Nokia N93 and N95. System Rush: Evolution is the sequel for N-Gage 2.0 mobile gaming devices, featuring better graphics, a new story, and new game types (there are three in total; racing, shooting and flying). It was announced on 10 May 2006. As of February 4, 2008, this sequel/remake can also be played on the N81 by downloading and installing the new N-Gage 2.0 platform.
