= WWE Aftershock =

2005 video game

- European cover art featuring Chris Benoit, Edge, The Undertaker and Eddie Guerrero
- Developer: Exient Entertainment
- Publisher: THQ Wireless
- Platform: N-Gage
- Release: EU: May 19, 2005; NA: August 15, 2005
- Genres: Professional wrestling, fighting
- Modes: Single-player, multiplayer

WWE Aftershock is a professional wrestling video game released exclusively on the N-Gage in 2005.

== Development ==
The game was announced by Nokia in collaboration with THQ and WWE in August 2004. It was originally scheduled to release in the fourth quarter of 2004, then February 2005, and then later on March 22.

== Gameplay ==
There are five main events and Survival (multiple enemies at the same time), King of the Ring (ladder tournament), and Tag Team (two versus two) match options. WWE Aftershock includes 12 WWE superstars, such as John Cena. The game features two-player contests through Bluetooth and the N-Gage Arena. Two of the twelve wrestlers are unlockable by winning the King of the Ring and playing in two-player contests. The AI controls two of the wrestlers in multiplayer King of the Ring. Attacks include hits, grapples, and Irish whips. Submission holds are available after a takedown. Each character has four front grapples and ground grapples, and his signature move or hold. Every button is assigned one action. The wrestlers grapple in a 3D arena. Wrestlers have entrance music.

== Reception ==
Reception

Aggregate score
Aggregator	Score
Metacritic	53/100

Review scores
Publication	Score
GameSpot	5.3/10
GameSpy	3/5
IGN	5/10

The game received "mixed or average" reviews according to video game review aggregator Metacritic.

GameSpot rated the game a 5.3 of 10 stating that "WWE Aftershock may be the only wrestling game available on the N-Gage, but that alone doesn't make it a good value".

== See also ==
- List of licensed wrestling video games
- List of fighting games
