= American Prayer =

Song by Bono and Dave Stewart featuring Various Artists
- Genre: Rock, alternative rock
- Songwriter(s): Bono, Dave Stewart, Pharrell Williams

"American Prayer" is a 2002 song co-written by Bono of U2, Dave Stewart of the Eurythmics, and Pharrell Williams.

The song, which "reflects the ... hope that America, and American Christians in particular, will respond to the AIDS crisis", was first performed during Bono's Heart of America speaking tour in December 2002 in Lincoln, Nebraska. According to Bono, he hopes that the United States, "with its unparalleled economic, technological, military, and cultural power, will rethink its humble origins, the purpose that made it great." Bono described the song as a "paean to America" based on the "poetry of the Declaration of Independence and the taut truth in the Constitution", as well as The New Colossus, the poem written by Emma Lazarus for the Statue of Liberty. In writing of the origin of the song, Stewart said, "Bono was crafting the words in a way that would make people think about the fact that 'America' as a concept was a truly great idea, based on the bedrock of equality." On 3 December 2003 USA Today published a draft of the lyrics. Echoing Dr Martin Luther King Jr., the song ends with, "If you get to the top of the mountain, will you tell me what you see / If you get to the top of the mountain, remember me".

Bono, The Edge, Beyoncé, and Stewart performed the song on 29 November 2003 at the 46664 concert in Cape Town, South Africa to "break the stigmatisation that goes with being HIV positive". In the final chorus they sang "African Prayer".

The song was the final song performed by the final six contestants on Idol Gives Back on 25 April 2007. Bono directed the group and spoke to the audience about the ONE Campaign.

== 2008 version ==
In 2008, Dave Stewart reworked the song after concluding that Barack Obama represented "the embodiment of a new anthem for change", seeing him as the continuation of the work of Dr. Martin Luther King Jr. Stewart did not see the song as an endorsement as much as "a celebration of all those who have picked up a sign, who have registered to vote and are working to make the world a better place". He produced a music video with a number of other celebrities, releasing it on YouTube and The Huffington Post on 21 August 2008 just prior to the Democratic National Convention, 2008.

Stewart received permission from Dr. King's family to use film of Dr. King making his final speech the night before he was assassinated, which has been incorporated as a spoken word lyric of the song. The video features, in order of appearance, Dave Stewart, Forest Whitaker, Amy Keys, Macy Gray, Jason Alexander, Colbie Caillat, Whoopi Goldberg, Joss Stone, Buju Banton, Ann Marie Calhoun, Barry Manilow, Linda Perry, Cyndi Lauper, Sérgio Mendes, Herbie Hancock, Mike Bradford, Margaret Cho, Cindy Gomez, Martin Luther King Jr., Joan Baez, Daedelus, Pamela Anderson, Peter & Gordon, Sierra Swan, Nadirah X, and Perez Hilton.

== See also ==
- "Yes We Can", song and video by will.i.am supporting Obama
- "America's Song", song written by will.i.am, David Foster and George Pajon Jr.
