= Requiem of Hell =

2004 video game

- European cover art
- Developer: Digital Red
- Publisher: Nokia
- Platform: N-Gage
- Release: NA: November 22, 2004; EU: November 2004
- Genre: Roleplaying Game
- Modes: Single-player, multiplayer

Requiem of Hell is a 2004 roleplaying video game developed by Digital Red and published by Nokia for the N-Gage.

== Story ==
When a master demon from Hell named Dalu raises an army of undead, demons and fiends to ravage the world, an old wizard (Shaman) steps forth to stop Dalu and his forces. In a pitched battle, Shaman uses most of his power to decimate much of the demon army and fools Dalu into fleeing briefly. However, the old man realizes his weakened state won't stand up to another assault once Dalu returns from Hell. Shaman tells the fairy accompanying him (Gigi) to choose and revive a recently killed corpse that can fight against Dalu's minions and eventually gain enough power to defeat Dalu. After the introductory cinema, the player can choose to revive either a male (Troy) or female (Linda) who will take on enemies in different (and increasingly tougher) levels as the game progresses. Each character has a back story that ties them together, but the tragic connection between the two only becomes apparent as the endgame approaches.

== Reception ==
Reception

Aggregate score
Aggregator	Score
Metacritic	68/100

Review scores
Publication	Score
GameSpy	2/5
GameZone	8/10

The game received "average" reviews according to the review aggregation website Metacritic.
