= World Series of Poker: Pro Challenge =

2007 video game

- Developer: Glu Mobile
- Platforms: mobile phone, N-Gage 2.0
- Release: 2007 (Mobile game); 2008 (N-Gage 2.0 game)
- Genre: Poker
- Mode: Single player

World Series of Poker: Pro Challenge is a poker game (texas hold 'em) by Glu Mobile for mobile phones and the N-Gage 2.0 platform.

== Features ==
- Face up against some of the biggest names in poker including Johnny Chan, Michael Mizrachi, Annie Duke, and Shannon Elizabeth
- A first person perspective lets you observer your opponent's facial expressions
- Playing the cards right might fill up your opponents' "Tilt Meter" - damaging their good judgments as they psyche out
- Earning "Signature Chips" achievements as proof of your progress

== Development ==
World Series of Poker: Pro Challenge is developed by Glu Mobile and was first made available as a Java game in late June 2007. The game was then re-released on February 7, 2008, as part of the new N-Gage 2.0 platform.
