= Dirk Dagger and the Fallen Idol =

2008 video game

- Developer: Jadestone Group
- Publisher: Nokia Games Publishing
- Producer: Jonas Jepson
- Artist: Henrik Pettersson
- Writer: Andrew S. Walsh
- Platform: N-Gage 2.0
- Release: August 19, 2008
- Genre: Adventure
- Mode: Single player

Dirk Dagger and the Fallen Idol is an adventure game by Swedish developer Jadestone and published on the N-Gage 2.0 platform, released on August 19, 2008. A sequel, Dirk Dagger and the Nuclear Zeppelin, was announced in September 2009 and released in October 2009.

== Story ==
The player controls detective Dirk Dagger trying to solve various missions given to them. The first episode is called The Poochie Predicament and revolves around Dirk's partner Harry Cannon and a missing statue called the Fallen Idol.

== Features ==
- Use the phone's camera for looking around
- Classic film noir setting with a cartoon style to it
- Downloadable content - prolong the game by adding new adventures or "Episodes"

== Development ==
Dirk Dagger and the Fallen Idol was announced by Nokia on 17 December 2007. During development it was called Dirk Spanner and the Fallen Idol. The game won an IMG award for its gameplay at the Mobile World Congress in Barcelona 2008.
