= Reset Generation =

2008 video game

- Developer: RedLynx
- Publisher: Nokia Games Publishing
- Designers: Scott Foe, Antti Ilvessuo, Olli Sinerma
- Composer: 8 Bit Weapon
- Platforms: Windows, N-Gage 2.0
- Release: August 4, 2008
- Genres: Puzzle, Strategy
- Modes: Single-player, Multiplayer

Reset Generation is a cross-platform action-puzzle video game developed by RedLynx and published by Nokia for N-Gage 2.0 and Windows. The game was developed - in part - by Ben 'Yahtzee' Croshaw, a well known author and game critic. The single-player PC version of the game was made available to FilePlanet subscribers on July 25, 2008 in the form of a browser game. It was made available to non-subscribers on August 1, 2008. The full N-Gage and Windows version of the game with included online capability was released on August 4, 2008.

== Creation ==
Nokia first publicly worked on the game in July 2007 under the code name Project White Rock for their upcoming N-Gage 2.0 platform. The game was developed by RedLynx. Reset Generation was Nokia's flagship game for their platform and therefore high budget. Soundtrack for the game was composed by 8 Bit Weapon. The Windows version of the game was available free whereas the N-Gage version costed £8/€10 for the full game - with limited-time licenses available at lower prices and a free trial version.

== Features ==
Some heroes are parodies of known video game characters.

Reset Generation arcade match

Reset Generation includes ten archetypal characters easily recognizable by older players who grew up with the NES and Mega Drive/Genesis, with some of the more easily recognizable characters being a hedgehog, plumber, monster trainer and a level 50 elf. Apart from having 4-player matches, the game also offers an 18 mission-based single-player campaign.

The gameplay has the player try to "rescue" a princess, which is being held in the castle(s) of your opponent(s). Each player must try and breach another player's castle and then return the princess home to their own. Succeeding in rescuing (or capturing, rather) another player's princess eliminates him or her from the game. Players can pick up different items like springs, teleports, BFGPs and Monster Boxes or use the hero's special power to accomplish this target.

The computer version of the game is a browser game that can be played through the Reset Generation official website or it can be embedded onto any other website with the provided source code. Reportedly however only Internet Explorer and Mozilla Firefox are compatible.

Both the N-Gage and PC version of the game are mutually compatible, thus players of the N-Gage and PC versions of the game can play each other in multiplayer mode.

== Reception ==
Reception

Review scores
| Publication | Score |
|---|---|
| 1Up.com | A |
| Edge | 8/10 |
| Eurogamer | 8/10 |
| GameRevolution | A− |
| All About N-Gage | 90 % |
| Evergeek | 4.75/5 |
| NokNok.tv | 5/5 |
| Pocket Gamer | 10/10 |

Reset Generation was the most critically acclaimed N-Gage game of 2008. The game is in retrospect seen as one of the best first-party Nokia titles on the platform.

During the 12th Annual Interactive Achievement Awards, the Academy of Interactive Arts & Sciences nominated Reset Generation for "Cellular Game of the Year".
