= Scalable Network Application Package =

Online gaming platform

Scalable Network Application Package (SNAP) or SNAP Mobile is an online gaming platform from Nokia. It is intended for use for Java multiplayer online games. It consists of SNAP Mobile API for the client and it uses HTTP or TCP to connect to the SNAP Mobile gateway.

This gaming platform was the old Sega Network Application Package that Sega sold to Nokia on 2003 and renamed it as Scalable Network Application Package.

== See also ==
- N-Gage Arena
- Mobile game
- Java ME
