= Ideaworks Game Studio =

British video game developer

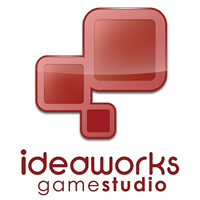
- Type: Limited company
- Industry: Interactive entertainment
- Founded: 1998
- Defunct: 2012
- Fate: Unknown
- Headquarters: Bayswater, London, England
- Key people: Rob Hendry (Head of Studio); Phil Waymouth (Head of Business Development); Russell Clarke (Head of Engineering); Barclay Deeming (Head of Product Development)
- Products: Video Games
- Website: ideaworksgamestudio.com

Ideaworks Game Studio (IGS) was a British video game developer based in London. Founded in 1998, originally trading as Ideaworks3D the studio has a heritage of developing high-end native cross platform technology and games for the smartphone markets. The studio has created award-winning games, including original and franchise-based games for publishers.

== Studio history ==
Founded in 1998, Ideaworks3D was established to develop high-end, native, cross platform technology and games software. The studio innovated graphics on low-power devices, with projects that included porting a PS1 version of Tomb Raider to the Compaq iPAQ. Ideaworks3D's launched Nokia's N-Gage in 2004, for which the company developed 4 launch titles that used multi-player and network features.

In 2005 a game studio was established with a team of employees from PC and console backgrounds to develop AAA native C++ based mobile games. The company has subsequently brought both original and franchise-based games for publishers to market, receiving awards, for their content.

In mid-2009, Ideaworks3D was restructured into two distinct operations, with Ideaworks Game Studio continuing to develop for iPhone and Smartphone but with a remit to focus on a broader range of cross platform, download capable, handheld and console platforms. Ideaworks Labs continued to focus on cross platform technology development, with its Airplay SDK, which became available commercially. In June 2011 Airplay SDK was re-branded Marmalade.

== Studio services ==
=== Cross platform development ===
Ideaworks Game Studio history includes extensive experience porting games from multiple sources to its propriety Airplay SDK, enabling deployment to multiple handheld and mobile platforms. The studio's development pipeline and engine extends their core Airplay technology, to a wider range of gaming formats including Nintendo DS/DSi and Sony PSP Go alongside development support for console based digital download formats such as Xbox Live Arcade, PlayStation Network and WiiWare.

=== Studio project development ===
Ideaworks Game Studio provides full cycle development for original IP projects, alongside its capability to work with the premier games industry IPs.

== Games ==
| Release date | Title(s) | Platform(s) | Publisher(s) |
|---|---|---|---|
| 2011 | Call of Duty: Black Ops – Zombies | iPhone | Activision/ Treyarch |
| 2011 | Fable III Coin Golf | Windows Phone 7 | Lionhead Studios |
| 2010 | Need for Speed: Shift | Android (Porting) | EA |
| 2010 | Call of Duty: World at War: Zombies II | iPhone | Activision/ Treyarch |
| 2009 | Call of Duty: World at War – Zombies | iPhone | Activision/ Treyarch |
| 2009 | BackBreaker Football: Tackle Alley | iPhone | NaturalMotion |
| 2009 | The Game of Life | iPhone | EA |
| 2008 | Resident Evil: Degeneration | iPhone, Mobile/ NGage | Capcom |
| 2008 | Metal Gear Solid Mobile | Mobile/ NGage | Konami |
| 2007 | Project Gotham Racing Mobile | Symbian, Windows Mobile, Mobile, Android(Lost Version) | Glu, Arm Holdings |
| 2007 | Mile High Pinball | N-Gage | Nokia |
| 2007 | System Rush: Evolution | N-Gage | Nokia |
| 2006 | Need for Speed: Most Wanted | Mobile | EA |
| 2006 | Final Fantasy VII: Dirge of Cerberus – Lost Episode | Mobile | Square Enix |
| 2005 | Need for Speed: Underground 2 | Mobile | EA |
| 2005 | The Sims 2 Mobile | Mobile | EA, Maxis |
| 2005 | System Rush | N-Gage | Nokia |
| 2005 | Colin McRae Rally | N-Gage | Codemasters |
| 2004 | The Sims Bustin' Out | N-Gage | EA |
| 2003 | Pandemonium! | N-Gage | Eidos Interactive |
| 2003 | Tony Hawk's Pro Skater | N-Gage | Activision |
| 2003 | Tomb Raider | N-Gage, Windows Mobile | Eidos Interactive |
