= Supreme Snowboarding =

1999 video game

- European box art
- Developer: Housemarque
- Publisher: Infogrames
- Platforms: Microsoft Windows, Game Boy Color
- Release: Windows: EU: 1 July 1999; NA: 7 March 2000; Game Boy Color: EU: 1999; NA: 21 December 1999
- Genre: Snowboarding

Supreme Snowboarding (known as Boarder Zone in the United States) is a snowboarding video game created by Housemarque for Microsoft Windows with a Game Boy Color version by Software Creations in 1999. It was one of the first snowboarding games for Windows to take full advantage of 3D graphics cards that were becoming the norm in the late 1990s. Over 1.5 million units were sold worldwide, allowing Supreme Snowboarding to become the first hit title in Finnish game development. The game received positive critical reception, as well as acclaim for having one of the best visuals of its time, though its lack of content and replay value was sometimes criticized.

== Gameplay ==
The game's core is built around three major game modes:

- In Arcade, players strive to obtain increasingly large point totals through performing tricks or racing against ghost snowboarders.
- The second mode consists of jumping in either a slope or a half-pipe; with competitors divided into three classes based on performance. Each jump is performed thrice with virtual judges awarding points.
- In the third mode players compete in slalom and trick competitions and races.

The controls of the game received praise, with players only using three other keys for jumps, tricks and carving snow, along with the directional keys. Players hit the jump key to initiate a trick, the trick key is used to perform such tricks, and the third button allows characters to turn faster by carving into the snow.

There are nine slalom and six trick courses, as well as six characters, each with their unique pros and cons. Each course features four types of weather and is divided into three types: Alpine, Village or Forest. There are also four snowboards, each designed to accommodate a different type of snowboarding. No internet multiplayer is offered though players can play with up to eight people over a LAN.

== Release ==
Supreme Snowboarding was often bundled with other products; for example, players obtained a copy of the game with their Kellogg's cereal. A cut version of the game, titled Flo-Boarding, was packaged into every N-Gage device in 2003, becoming the first game to be bundled together with the phone.

There were initial efforts by Sega of America to port "high-profile titles" including Supreme Snowboarding to the Dreamcast console, though, like many others, such efforts eventually failed due to the platform's uncertain profile with the impending arrival of the PlayStation 2.

== Reception ==
Reception

Aggregate score
Aggregator	Score	
Aggregator	GBC	PC
GameRankings	60%	75%

Review scores
Publication	Score	
Publication	GBC	PC
AllGame	2/5	N/A
CNET Gamecenter	N/A	7/10
Computer Games Strategy Plus	N/A	2.5/5
Edge	N/A	7/10
EP Daily	N/A	8/10
GameFan	N/A	85%
GamePro	N/A	4/5
GameSpot	N/A	6.3/10
GameZone	N/A	8.5/10
IGN	7/10	8/10
Next Generation	N/A	3/5
Nintendo Power	6/10	N/A
PC Accelerator	N/A	7/10
PC Gamer (US)	N/A	73%

The PC version initially received critical acclaim upon release in Finland, with its graphics, speed and responsive controls being lauded. Reviewers praised the game for its realistic snowy environments and special effects, such as shadowing and weather. It was also commended as being easy to control and enjoyable to play, though criticism was leveled at the limited number of tracks and lack of content.

Juho Kuorikoski, in his book Finnish Video Games: A History and Catalog, noted in a more contemporary review how despite "Supreme Snowboarding [not being] the young buck it used to be, it still has that addictive element to it. While less impressive on the outside, its inner beauty has remained intact."

In the United States, the PC version received favourable reviews, while the Game Boy Color version received mixed reviews, according to the review aggregation website GameRankings. Tal Blevis of IGN praised the graphics, value for money and "simple fun" of the PC version, but fault was found with the game's relative lack of content. This sentiment was echoed by Ryan J. Fong of GameSpot, who praised the graphics and gameplay of the same PC version, but also complained about the lack of content and replay value. GameFan gave the same PC version a favourable review, almost a month before its U.S. release date. Doug Trueman of NextGen called the same PC version "A strong title, but not what it could have been."

As a technologically advanced game, Supreme Snowboarding was adopted by hardware manufacturers to showcase the potential of PC processors and graphics cards in 1998 and 1999 at industry events.

Supreme Snowboarding was the first Finnish game to be truly successful, and the first to sell over one million units.

== Sequel ==
A sequel titled Transworld Snowboarding was released for the Xbox console in 2002, noted for being the first Finnish-developed console game. It was renamed from Supreme Snowboarding 2 following a licensing shift as the publisher was moved from France to the United States and eventually became a moderate hit.
