= Pocket Kingdom: Own the World =

2004 video game

- Developer: io-Spiral (Note: Produced by Sega, online programming by Human Interface Communications (H.I.C.), additional work by BlueShift)
- Publisher: Nokia
- Producers: Hiroshi Okamoto; Kunihiro Shimizu
- Designer: Hyeonil Song
- Programmer: Hyeonil Song
- Artist: Chikanobu Itō
- Writer: Chikanobu Itō
- Platform: N-Gage
- Release: NA: November 24, 2004; EU: November 29, 2004
- Genre: Massively multiplayer online role-playing game
- Modes: Single player, multiplayer

Pocket Kingdom: Own the World is a mobile Massively Multiplayer Online Game for the Nokia N-Gage, by Sega. The game is a spiritual sequel to an earlier SEGA game, Dragon Force, which was for the Sega Saturn.

== Gameplay ==
The theme is somewhat atypical for a video game, since it makes fun of the usual conventions of MMORPGs: here, every character knows they are in a video game, talks in leet-speak, and even the plot itself is about replacing three griefers who were banned from a high score table.

The game features both online (using the N-Gage Arena) and offline modes; both are similar, but in the online mode you can find other players and talk to or attack them – or be attacked by them. The crafting system is extensive – according to the authors, there are more than 50,000 possible object combinations.

Most of the game consists of buying units, equipping them, setting battle tactics, and sending them into battles. With experience, and using crafted "emblems", characters can be upgraded into more powerful and varied classes.

== Reception ==
Reception

Aggregate score
Aggregator	Score
Metacritic	70/100

Review scores
Publication	Score
Edge	5/10
Electronic Gaming Monthly	5.5/10
Game Informer	8/10
GameSpot	6.8/10
GameSpy	4.5/5
GameZone	8.2/10

The game received "average" reviews according to the review aggregation website Metacritic.
