= Mile High Pinball =

2005 video game

- Cover art of Mile High Pinball for the N-Gage hardware
- Developer: Ideaworks3D
- Publisher: Nokia
- Platforms: N-Gage, N-Gage 2.0
- Release: N-Gage: EU: October 2005; NA: November 14, 2005; N-Gage 2.0; May 6, 2008
- Genre: Pinball
- Modes: Single player, multiplayer

Mile High Pinball is a 2005 pinball video game developed by Ideaworks3D and published by Nokia for the N-Gage. In 2008 the game was revamped and released on the N-Gage platform.

== Gameplay ==
Unlike most pinball games, the object of Mile High Pinball is not to score points. Instead, players must keep bouncing their ball higher and higher, into different pinball tables. Players also cannot "lose" balls by missing them with the paddles and letting them fall - instead, if a player fails to successfully hit the ball, they drop down one level. There are also positive and negative powerups on the tables that players may pick up to boost or reduce their abilities. In addition, players collect a form of currency that they can use to buy items in the store.

Multiplayer, however, does use a points system. In ranked matches, finishing a round with the most points gives you one ranking point, which is tracked and published to a leader board, showing the highest ranked players.

== Reception ==
Reception

Aggregate score
Aggregator	Score
Metacritic	84/100

Review scores
Publication	Score
GameSpy	4/5
IGN	7.9/10
Pocket Gamer	7/10 (N-Gage 2.0)

Mile High Pinball received "favorable" reviews according to the review aggregation website Metacritic. The Academy of Interactive Arts & Sciences nominated Mile High Pinball for "Cellular Game of the Year" during the 9th Annual Interactive Achievement Awards.
