= Metal Gear Solid Mobile =

2008 video game

- Title screen
- Developer: Ideaworks Game Studio
- Publisher: Konami
- Series: Metal Gear
- Platforms: N-Gage; BREW; Java
- Release: Mobile phones; JP: 2008; NA: March 19, 2008; N-Gage; WW: December 11, 2008
- Genres: Action-adventure, stealth
- Mode: Single-player

Metal Gear Solid Mobile is an action-adventure stealth game developed by Ideaworks Game Studio and published by Konami. A spin-off of the Metal Gear series, it was announced as part of the 20th anniversary of the franchise in 2007 and was released for mobile phones in 2008, including American carrier Verizon Wireless and later on the N-Gage 2.0 platform. featuring original content, 3D art and camera works, an in-game camouflage system, and additional controls. Konami also offered the game as a paid download or pre-installed in a Metal Gear-branded cell phone.

== Gameplay ==
Gameplay screenshot (N-Gage version)

== Story ==
The story, considered canon, takes place between Metal Gear Solid and Metal Gear Solid 2: Sons of Liberty, after Revolver Ocelot has leaked technical information on Metal Gear REX to the world. As a counter-measure, Solid Snake and Otacon form Philanthropy, an anti-Metal Gear organization whose goal is the complete eradication of all Metal Gears. Otacon quickly receives his first lead on development of a new Metal Gear. AI programmer Dr. Victoria Reed has agreed to reveal new details on the Metal Gear in exchange for assistance in her escape.

Midway through the mission however, it turns out Victoria Reed means VR. Snake finds out the Otacon he is talking to is part of a giant VR simulation. Otacon from the outside world then breaks in and helps guide Snake out of the VR simulation. Snake fights "The Commander" on top of a VR Metal Gear Rex. After defeating him, Snake wakes up to unnamed voices speaking. They say that while Snake did prove useful, he failed to provide them with the battle data they needed for the Project, and they instruct someone to erase all memories of the simulation and dump him back where they kidnapped him. One unnamed voice then says that they already have the second test subject lined up. One of the voices then says, "...Let's see if Jack can do better."

== Reception ==
Eduardo Vasconcellos of IGN reviewed the BREW version of the game released on Verizon Wireless and gave it 8 out of 10, commenting that it "captures the spirit of Solid Snake while providing the core gameplay we all know and love". Joseph Hanlon of CNET reviewed the N-Gage version of the game and rated it 2.5 out of 10, criticising "boring gameplay", the graphics and short game length. On the other hand, Jon Mundy of Pocket Gamer gave the N-Gage version 4.5 out of 5 praising "stunning presentation, innovative gameplay and gripping story" and calling it a "killer app" for the platform.

On February 14, 2008, Metal Gear Solid Mobile won the "Grand Prix" and "Operator's Choice" awards at the 2008 International Mobile Gaming Awards.
