= Digital Legends =

Spanish video game developer

Digital Legends Entertainment S.L.
- Logo used since 2001
- Type: Subsidiary
- Industry: Video games
- Founded: May 2001; 25 years ago in Barcelona, Spain
- Founders: Xavier Carrillo Costa, Ángel Cuñado Pérez, Jean-Philippe Raynaud
- Headquarters: Barcelona, Spain
- Key people: Xavier Carrillo Costa (studio head)
- Products: Call of Duty series (2021–present)
- Number of employees: 55
- Parent: Activision (2021–present)
- Website: digital-legends.com

Digital Legends Entertainment S.L., is a Spanish video game developer based in Barcelona, Spain, specialising in mobile titles. Three former members of Rebel Act Studios founded it in May 2001. The studio was acquired by Activision on 28 October 2021 and has since contributed to several titles in the Call of Duty franchise.

== History ==
=== Origins ===
Xavier Carrillo Costa, Angel Cuñado Perez and Jean-Philippe Raynaud founded Digital Legends Entertainment in May 2001 after leaving Rebel Act Studios, the Barcelona studio behind the action game Severance: Blade of Darkness. Carrillo Costa, who had served as production and development director at Rebel Act, went on to study Telecommunications Engineering at the Polytechnic University of Madrid and became a founding vice-president of both DEV, the Spanish Games Developers Association, and its Catalan equivalent, DEVICAT.

From 2001 to 2006 the studio split its work between PC games and mobile titles. In late 2006 it shifted toward mobile development, a change that coincided with the growth of the smartphone games market. The studio became a first-party developer for Nokia and built its own proprietary engine, Karisma, designed for high-performance mobile graphics.

=== iPhone era ===
In 2008 the studio's game Kroll was selected by Apple for a public demonstration at a major product keynote. Scott Forstall, Apple's Vice President of iPhone Software, introduced the Barcelona studio on stage. Xavier Carrillo Costa presented the game live, becoming one of the first European developers to appear at an Apple keynote. Steve Jobs personally attended the presentation and approved the demo before it went on stage. The experience brought the studio significant international attention and generated coverage from Spanish technology press.

Kroll won the People's Choice Award at the IMGA Awards 2008. It was followed by Bruce Lee: Dragon Warrior in 2010, which won a further People's Choice Award at the 2010 IMGA Awards and received a nomination for Excellence in Design. The studio also worked on Battlefield: Bad Company 2 for iOS and Android for Electronic Arts, and on Icebreaker Hockey for NaturalMotion, as part of its work for external publishers alongside its own intellectual properties.

=== Respawnables franchise ===
In 2012 the studio launched Respawnables, a free-to-play third-person shooter for iOS and Android that became its most successful original property. The game built a large player community and spawned a sequel, Respawnables Heroes, in 2019. PocketGamer.biz, a leading trade publication for the mobile games industry, later described Digital Legends Entertainment as best known for developing and publishing the Respawnables franchise.

=== Acquisition by Activision ===
On 28 October 2021, Activision announced it had acquired Digital Legends Entertainment for an undisclosed sum. The acquisition was covered independently by Game Developer magazine, PocketGamer.biz and Charlie INTEL, among others. Activision said the acquisition would support its mobile development work on the Call of Duty franchise.

Barcelona & Partners, the city's official investment promotion agency, highlighted the acquisition as further evidence of Barcelona's growing status as one of Europe's most important video game hubs.

=== Call of Duty franchise ===
Following the acquisition, Digital Legends Entertainment joined Activision Shanghai, Beenox and Solid State Studios in developing Call of Duty: Warzone Mobile. The project had been in development under the codename Project Aurora before its announcement in March 2022. The game launched worldwide on 21 March 2024 for iOS and Android, generating $1.4 million in consumer spending within its first four days. The beta received generally positive reviews from Tom's Guide and IGN. Eurogamer described the gameplay as "quick and fun", praising the graphics quality while noting higher battery consumption on some devices. In May 2025, Activision removed Call of Duty: Warzone Mobile from Apple's App Store and Google Play and ended new seasonal content and gameplay updates. In February 2026, Activision announced that the game's servers would shut down on 17 April 2026, after which it would no longer be playable.

In November 2024, the studio announced its contribution to the development of Call of Duty: Black Ops 6. Digital Legends Entertainment later provided additional development on Call of Duty: Black Ops 7, which was led by Treyarch in partnership with Raven Software.

In 2026, Activision announced that the Nintendo Switch 2 version of Call of Duty: Modern Warfare 4 was being developed by Infinity Ward in partnership with Digital Legends Entertainment.

== Games ==
Year	Title	Platform(s)	Note
2005	One	N-Gage	Developed in collaboration with Nokia
2006	Soccer Fury	Windows	Developed in collaboration with NCSoft
2008	One, Who Is Next	N-Gage	Developed in collaboration with Nokia
2008	One Sequel	N-Gage	Developed in collaboration with Nokia
2008	Kroll	iPhone, iPod Touch	Developed collaboration with GungHo Online Entertainment
2009	Toryu, Legend of Kroll	iPhone, iPod Touch	Developed in collaboration with Nokia
2009	Dance Fabulous	N-Gage	
2010	Bruce Lee: Dragon Warrior	iPhone, iPod Touch, iPad and Android	
2010	Battlefield: Bad Company 2 (mobile)	iOS and Android	Developed in collaboration with Electronic Arts
2011	Nutty Sam	iPhone, iPod Touch, iPad	
2011	Icebreaker Hockey	iOS and Android	Developed in collaboration with NaturalMotion
2012	Respawnables	iPhone, iPod and iPad	
2015	Afterpulse	iOS and Android	
2024	Call of Duty: Warzone Mobile	iOS and Android	Additional development
2024	Call of Duty: Black Ops 6	PS4, PS5, WIN, XBO, XBSX/S	Additional development
2025	Call of Duty: Black Ops 7	PS4, PS5, WIN, XBO, XBSX/S	Additional development
2026	Call of Duty: Modern Warfare 4	NS2, PS5, WIN, XBSX/S	Developed Nintendo Switch 2 version

== Awards ==
- People's Choice Award at the IMGA Awards 2010 for Bruce Lee: Dragon Warrior
- Nominated for Excellence in Design at the IMGA Awards 2010 for Bruce Lee: Dragon Warrior
- People's Choice Award at the IMGA Awards 2008 for Kroll
- Excellence in 3D Award at the IMGA Awards 2007 for One Sequel
- Nominated for Most Wanted Game of 2005 by GameSpot for One
- Nominated for Best Mobile Game at E3 2005 by 1UP.com for One
