= Nokia N79 =

Mobile phone model

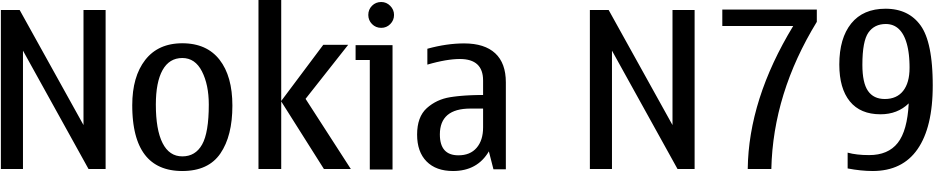

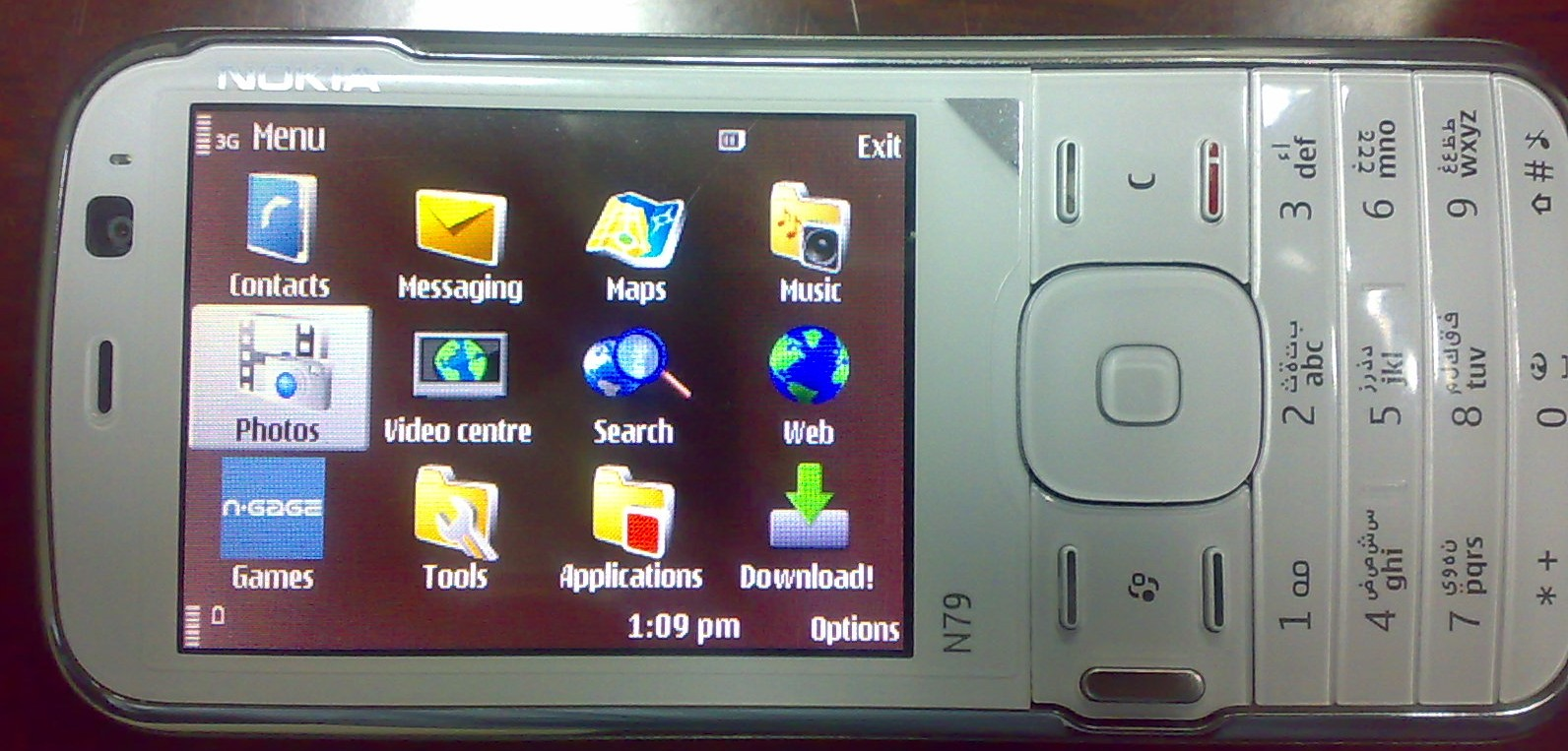
- Manufacturer: Nokia
- First released: 25 August 2008; 17 years ago
- Predecessor: Nokia N73; Nokia N78; Nokia N81
- Successor: Nokia N97 Mini
- Related: Nokia N96; Nokia N97; Nokia N85; Nokia N86 8MP
- Compatible networks: Quad-band GSM 850/900/1800/1900, EGSM 900, Dual-Band UMTS 900/2100 with HSDPA
- Form factor: Candybar
- Dimensions: 110×49×15 mm (4.33×1.93×0.59 in)
- Weight: 97 g (3.4 oz)
- Connectivity: WLAN 802.11b/g Bluetooth 2.0; Micro-USB 2.0; Nokia 3.5 mm AV Connector, Hot swappable microSDHC

The Nokia N79 is a Symbian OS v9.3 mobile phone and a member of the Nokia Nseries multimedia smartphone family running on S60 3rd Edition Feature Pack 2. It was officially announced by Nokia on 25 August 2008. The N79 improves upon both the Nokia N81 (2007) and Nokia N78 (2008) with its 5-megapixel camera and a faster CPU. It retailed for 350 euros upon release in October 2008.

The N79 has a somewhat more vibrant style compared to usual Nseries devices, with a rotated Nokia logo (this would later appear on the Nokia N97). Nokia advertised the N79's bold-coloured Xpress-on covers which change the software's colour theme to the cover's. It was also slim by Nseries standards and considered to be attractive. Other features include a 2.4-inch display, 369 MHz ARM11 processor, physical keylock switch, FM transmitter and the Navi wheel.

On 14 January 2009, Nokia announced it would ship a sports edition, dubbed the N79 Active, that included a Bluetooth heart rate monitor, an armband and a new version of the Nokia Sports Tracker application.

== Features ==
- Automatically change from portrait to landscape with orientation sensor
- Automatically adjusts display brightness and keypad backlight with ambient light sensor
- Automatically change theme to the color of the battery cover
- Navigate using the NaviWheel

Photos:

- Geotagging of captured pictures, videos and view them on a map
- Organize photos by albums and tags, as well as synchronize with PC
- Upload and share pictures and videos directly to Ovi and other webservices

Music:

- Audio is through standard 3.5 mm jack headphones, built-in 3D stereo speakers, FM transmitter or Bluetooth technology
- Digital music player with support for playlist editing, equalizer and categorized access to your music collection
- Synchronize and manage music with Nokia Music client
- Integrated FM transmitter and FM receiver
- Search, browse and purchase songs online in Nokia Music Store

Maps and Navigation:

- Built-in GPS with A-GPS support and integrated three months navigation license
- Multimedia city guides and navigation services available for purchase. Drive (voice guided car navigation) or Walk (pedestrian guidance for walking routes) modes.

Video:

- Full-screen video playback to view downloaded, streamed or recorded video clips
- Access internet video feeds through Nokia Video Center
- Access YouTube directly from your phone with integrated Flash Lite 3.0
- Transfer videos from compatible PC, using Hi-Speed USB 2.0 [Videos get converted automatically when drag-drop is used]

== Specifications ==
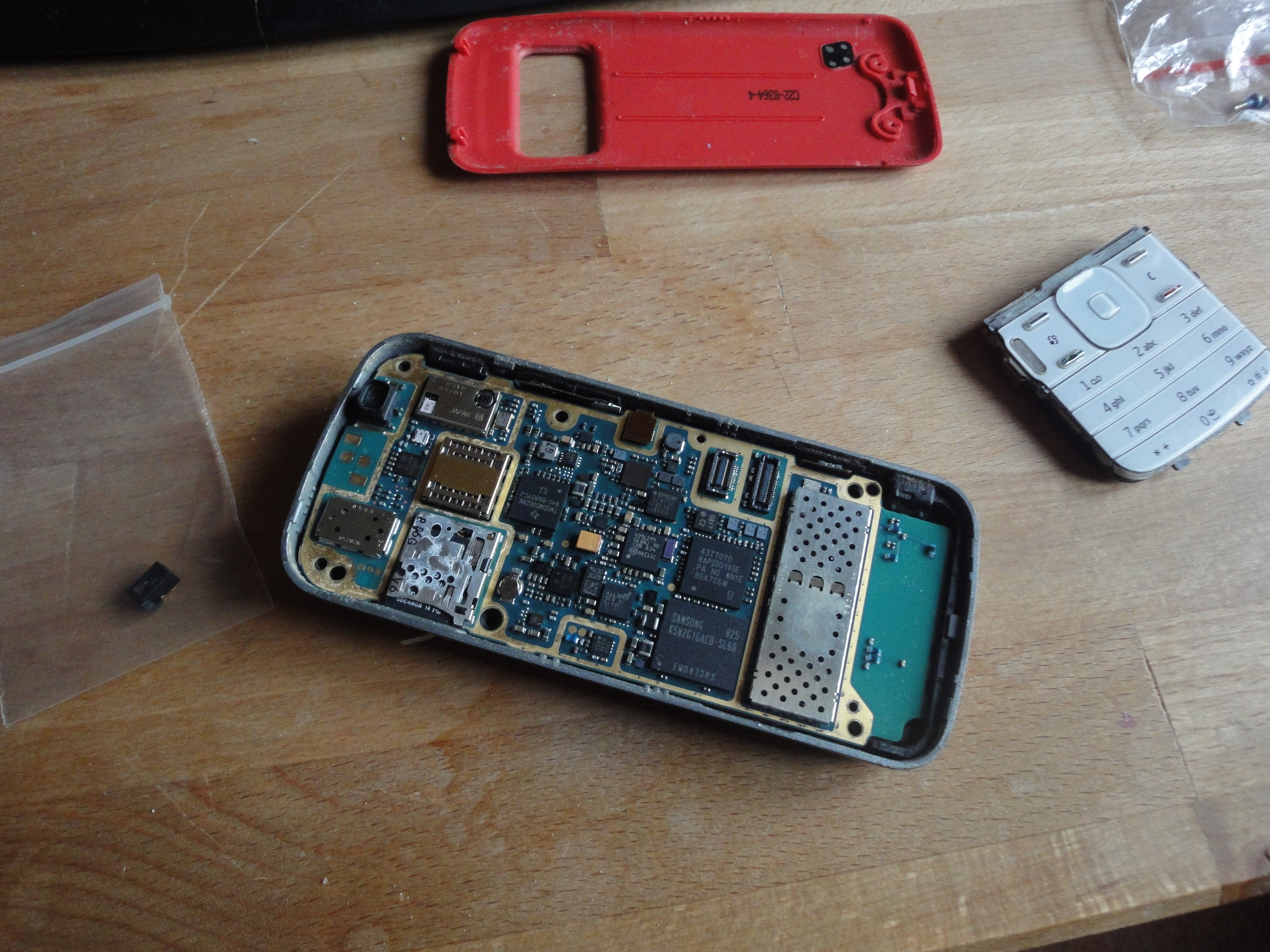
The motherboard of a N79

Feature	Specification
Form factor	Candybar
Operating System	Symbian S60 3rd Edition, Feature Pack 2
GSM frequencies	Quad-band GSM 850/900/1800/1900, EGSM 900
GPRS	Yes class A, multislot class 11, maximum speed 85.6/64.2 kbit/s (DL/UL)
EDGE (EGPRS)	Yes class B, multislot class 32, maximum speed 296/177.6 kbit/s (DL/UL)
WCDMA	Yes 900/2100, maximum speed 384/384 kbit/s (UL/DL)
HSDPA	Yes, 3.6 Mbit/s (DL)
Screen	320 x 240 pixels (QVGA), diagonal 2.4"
CPU	Single CPU, ARM 11 369 MHz
Internal Dynamic Memory (RAM)	128 MB SDRAM
Internal Flash Memory	83 MB
Camera	5 megapixel camera(Auto Focus) with Dual LED flash, 20x digital zoom, Carl Zeiss Optics: Tessar lens
Camera Lens Cover	Yes, acting as camera on/off switch.
Video recording	Yes, Main MPEG-4 VGA (640x480) 30 frame/s; Sound – dual mono, 48 kHz; Secondary (front) camera – Up to 2x digital video zoom 352 x 288 pixels (CIF), up to 15 frame/s
Multimedia Messaging	Yes
Video calls	Yes
Push to talk	Yes
Java support	Yes, CLDC 1.1, MIDP 2.1, PDA (JSR 75)
Memory card slot	Yes, microSDHC (up to 32 GB Micro SDHC)
Bluetooth	Yes, 2.0 with Enhanced Data Rate
Wi-Fi	Yes, WLAN IEEE 802.11 b/g with UPnP (Universal Plug and Play) & DLNA (Digital Living Network Alliance)
Infrared	No
Data cable support	Yes, USB 2.0 via micro-USB interface with [USB mass storage device class]
Browser	Web Browser for S60 (Nokia Mini Map)
Email	Yes
Push e-mail	Yes
Music player	Yes
Radio	Yes, Stereo FM radio with Visual Radio support. FM radio 87.5-108 MHz with RDS support FM transmitter 88.1 – 108 MHz
Video playback formats	MPEG4, AVC/H.264, WMV, RV, Flash Video, H.263/3GPP, RealVideo, with OMA DRM 2.0/1.0 & WMDRM support
Video streaming	MPEG4, AVC/H.264, WMV, RV, Flash Video, H.263/3GPP,
Audio playback formats	MP3/AAC/eAAC/eAAC+/WMA/M4A with playlists, with OMA DRM 2.0/1.0 & WMDRM support, Ogg with Symbian OggPlay, 24 hours+ playback
Integrated speakers	stereo speakers
FM Transmitter	Yes
TV out	Yes [Performance on device hampered]
HF speakerphone	Yes, with 3.5 mm audio jack and A2DP wireless stereo headphone support
Battery	Nokia Battery (BL-6F) 1200 mAh
Talk time(maximum)	GSM up to 5.5 hours – WCDMA up to 3.5 hours.
Standby time(maximum)	GSM up to 15.5 days – WCDMA up to 16.5 days – WLAN up to 7 days
Music playback time (maximum)	10 h
Gaming time (max)	9 h
SAR value	Type RM-348 N79 1.40 W/kg
Weight	97 g
Volume	74 cc
Dimensions	110 x 49 x 15 mm
Navigation	Integrated GPS with A-GPS

== See also ==
- Nseries
