= N-Gage =

Mobile phone and handheld game system

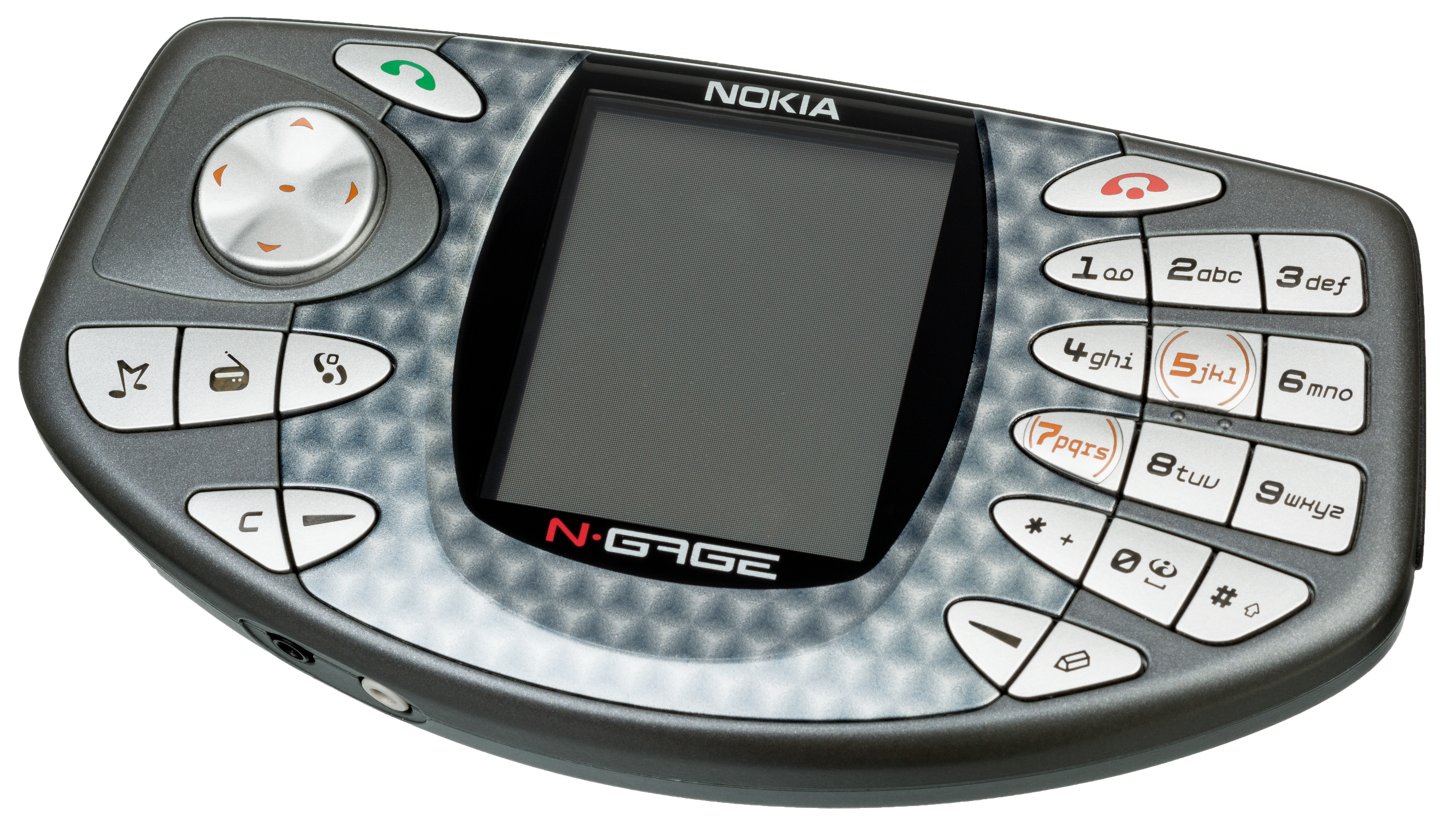
- Original model
- Codename: Starship (original); Aquarius (QD)
- Also known as: N-Gage "game deck"
- Manufacturer: Nokia
- Type: Handheld game console and mobile phone
- Generation: Sixth
- Released: 7 October 2003
- Discontinued: 26 November 2005
- Units sold: 3 million
- Media: MultiMediaCard
- Operating system: Symbian OS 6.1 (Series 60)
- CPU: ARM920T @ 104 MHz
- Display: 2.1 in (53 mm) TFT LCD, 176 × 208 px, 4,096 colors
- Connectivity: HSCSD, GPRS, Bluetooth
- Online services: N-Gage Arena
- Related: Nokia 7650, Nokia 3650, Nokia 6600

The N-Gage is a mobile device combining features of a cellular phone and a handheld game system developed by Nokia, released on 7 October 2003. Officially nicknamed the game deck, (Note: Attibuted to the following references:) the N-Gage's phone works on the GSM cellular network, and software-wise runs on the Series 60 platform on top of Symbian OS v6.1.

N-Gage attempted to lure gamers away from the Game Boy Advance by including telephone functionality, including SMS texting, in an "all-in-one" device. Game software was packaged in a MultiMediaCard to be inserted into the N-Gage's slot. Nokia also ran an online service community, N-Gage Arena, which also supported multiplayer on some titles, using the phone's GPRS data connection. Ultimately over 50 games — which included titles by major third-party publishers — were released for the system in a three year period.

The N-Gage was unsuccessful, partly because the buttons were not well-suited for gaming, while it was described as resembling a taco, which led to its mocking nickname "taco phone". Less than a year later, the QD model was introduced as a redesign of the original "Classic" N-Gage, fixing widely criticized issues and design problems. The revised model was unable to make an impact, and with only 3 million units sold in its two years, the N-Gage was a commercial failure and discontinued in November 2005, with Nokia moving its gaming capabilities onto selected Series 60 smartphones; this was announced as the N-Gage platform or "N-Gage 2.0" in 2007, carrying on the N-Gage name.

== History ==
Nokia officially introduced the N-Gage at the Mobile Internet Conference in Munich, on 4 November 2002, a device that integrated the functionalities of mobile phones and handheld game consoles, which some people were increasingly carrying side by side. Its original development codename was Starship.

The N-Gage had a reported development budget of more than $100 million. Games for N-Gage used to cost $600,000 to $1.5 million to develop. Nokia had attracted a decent amount of large third-party game companies that signed up to develop titles for the platform, including Eidos Interactive, Electronic Arts, Sega, Gameloft, Activision and Taito.

Many of the preloaded ringtones and sounds were composed by former demoscene musician Markus Castrén, who worked at Nokia during mid-2002. For both the N-Gage and Nokia 7600, he wrote ringtones in a variety of popular dance genres, as well as creating a small set of sounds inspired by 1980s arcade games; he chose to compose those in a chiptune style as music in video games of the time did not stand out as sounding distinctively game-related.

=== Release and lifetime ===
Nokia tested the N-Gage with consumers across Europe from August 2003 until release as part of the N-Gage Tour. With a launch price of US$299 (equivalent to $523 in 2025), the N-Gage was not commercially popular. In its first weeks of availability in the United States, it was outsold by the Game Boy Advance 100 to 1. Within 17 days of the deck's release, popular retailers GameStop and Electronics Boutique began offering $100 rebates on the deck's price.

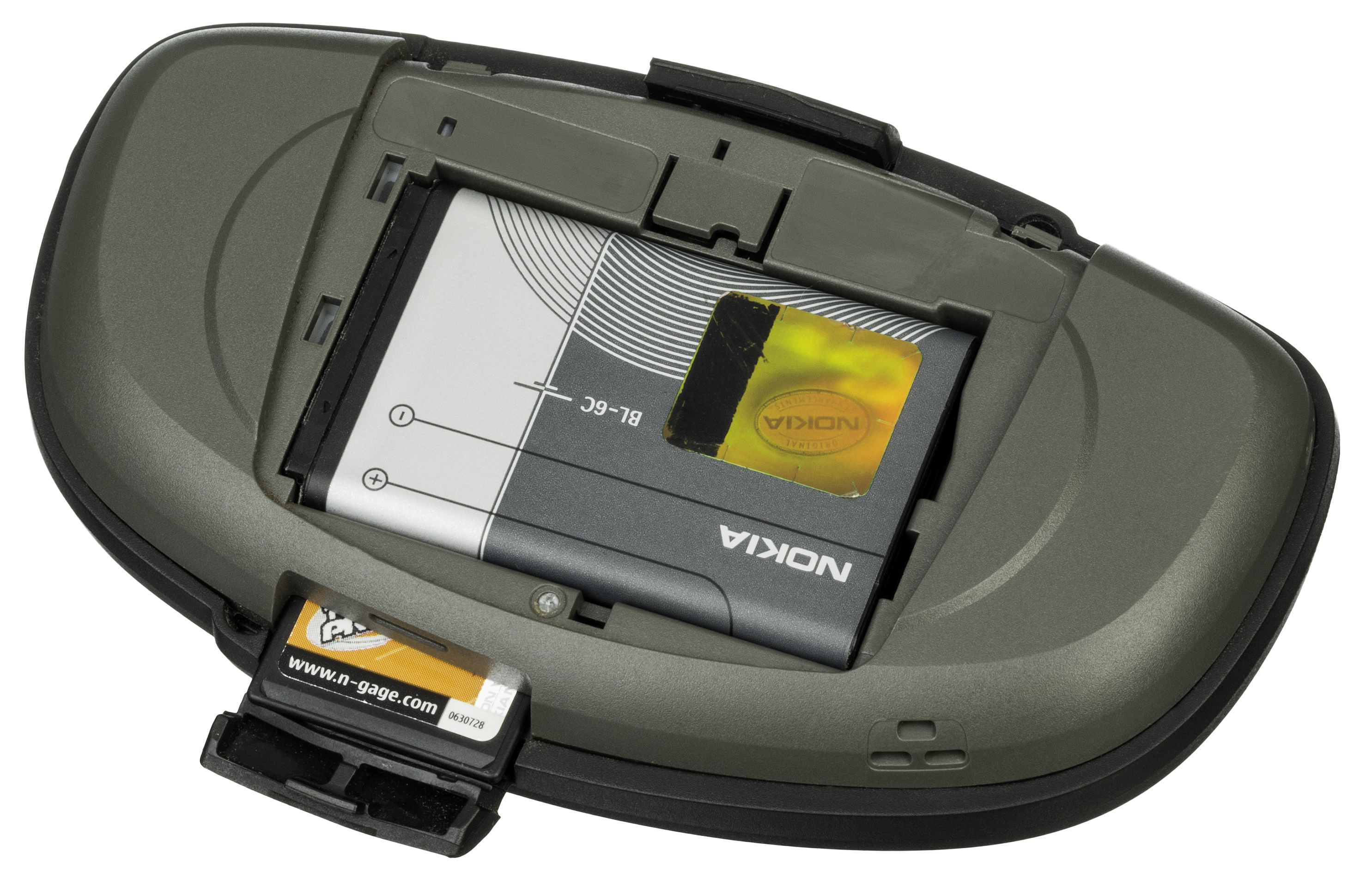
The QD revision allowed the cartridge to be hotswapped without removing the battery.

In February 2004, with the N-Gage failing to make a major impact four months on, CEO Jorma Ollila claimed that the device would be given until 2005 to be judged whether it was a success or failure. In 2004, a revision was released named N-Gage QD and this retailed at a lower price compared to the original N-Gage device, aided by the fact that it was usually sold with service contracts and applicable subsidies.

In January 2005, UK sales-tracking firm ChartTrack dropped the N-Gage from its regular ELSPA chart, commenting that "The N-Gage chart, though still produced, is of little interest to anyone. Sales of the machine and its software have failed to make any impact on the market at all." Although only directly reflective of the UK market, this was interpreted by some as a serious blow to the N-Gage as a viable gaming platform. Despite this, Nokia reaffirmed their commitment to the N-Gage as a platform, to the point where a new version of the hardware was rumored after GDC 2005.

In November 2005, Nokia admitted that the N-Gage failed, selling only one-third of the company's expectations. The product was discontinued from Western markets in November 2005, but would continue to be marketed in India and parts of Asia; the last game to be released in the U.S. for the system was Civilization in March 2006, and later that year the combat racer Payload in other territories. At E3 2006, Nokia promoted its next-generation N-Gage which would become the N-Gage service. A travelling exhibition about the N-Gage realised by the Finnish Museum of Games named "A Fantastic Failure" was opened in 2023.

== Hardware ==
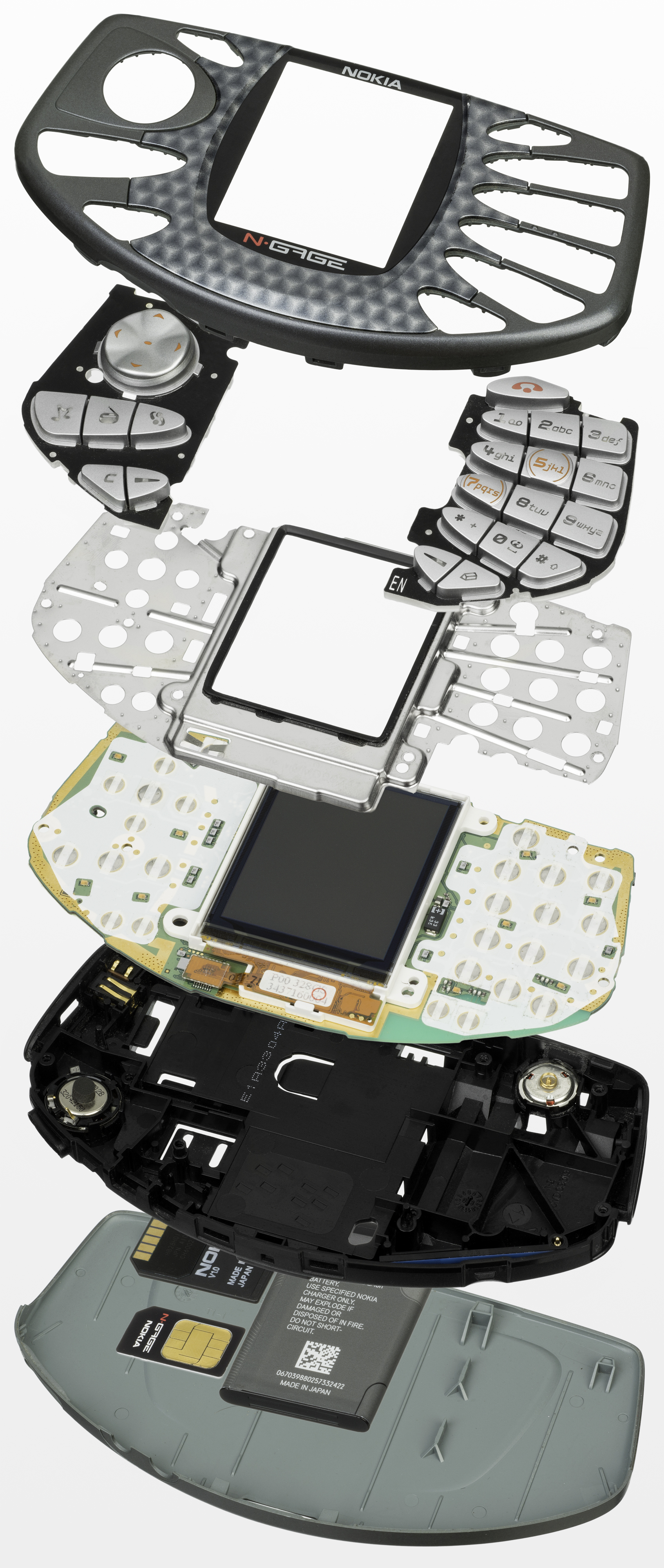
A disassembled N-Gage, showing each layer of hardware

=== Design ===
The N-Gage is used in a wide physical form with a 2.1 inch TFT display in the centre with a D-pad to the left and numerical keys to the right, among other buttons. This kind of design was roughly used before by the Nokia 5510 mobile phone.

Instead of using cables, multiplayer gaming was accomplished with Bluetooth or the Internet (via the N-Gage Arena service). Its main CPU was an ARM Integrated (ARMI) compatible chip (ARM4T architecture) running at 104 MHz, the same as the Nokia 7650 and 3650 phones.

The original phone's design was considered awkward: to insert a game, users had to remove the phone's plastic cover and remove the battery as the game slot was next to it. Another feature was that the speaker and microphone were located on the side edge of the phone; this often resulted in many describing it as talking into a "taco phone" or "Sidetalking", or simply that they had one very large ear, because the user held the edge of the phone against the cheek in order to talk into it. Usual for a phone, but unusually for a game system, it had a screen taller than it was wide, with a size of 2.1" and resolution of 176 X 208, giving an aspect ratio of 11:13; at the time most televisions were 4:3.

=== Accessories ===
Accessories for the N-Gage included extra batteries, car chargers, wireless Bluetooth headsets, and travel cases.

=== Revision ===
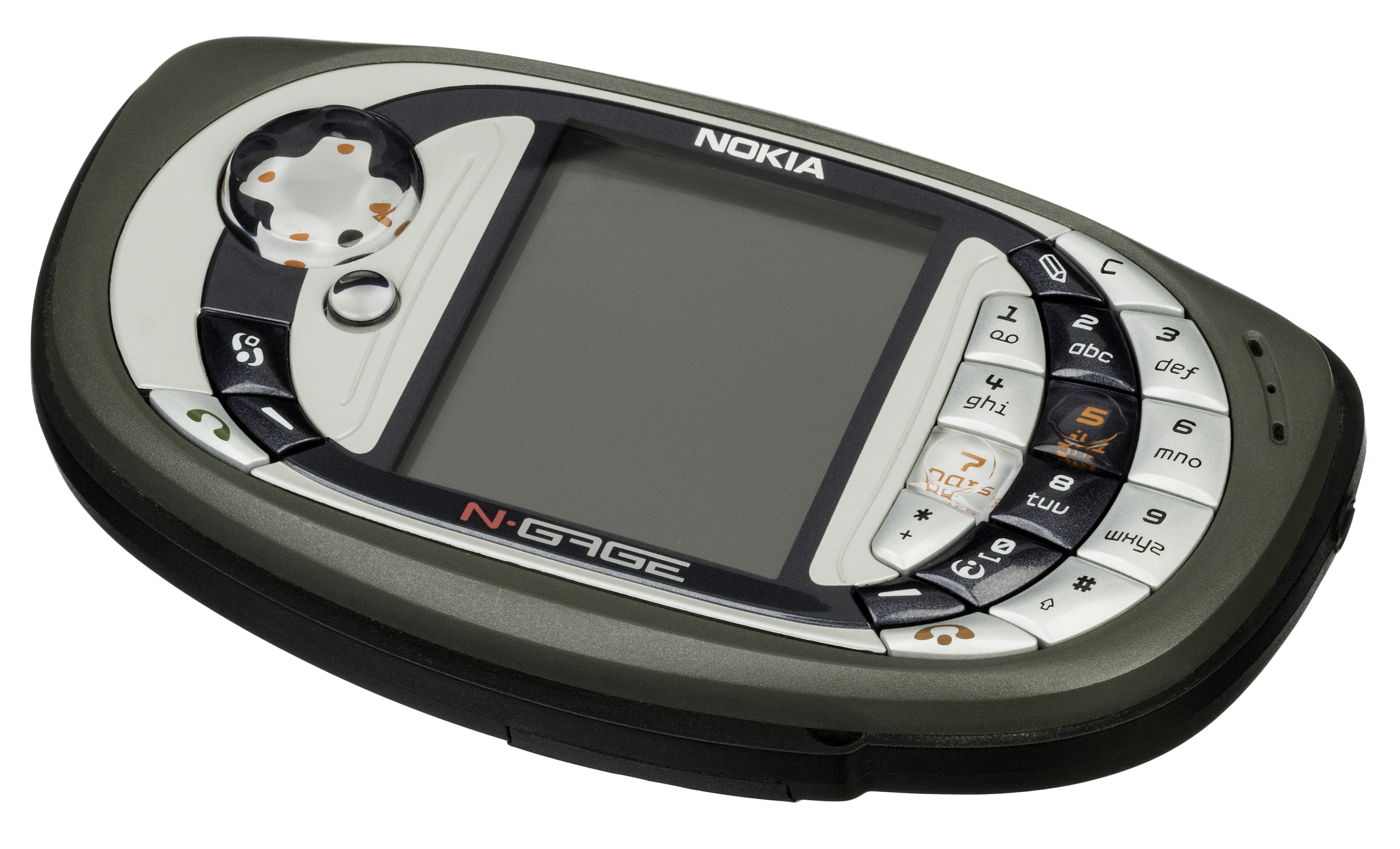
N-Gage QD

Following criticism of the N-Gage design, Nokia revised the model as the N-Gage QD, (Note: "QD" is primarily a marketing designation, and does not officially stand for anything. According to Nokia spokesman Will Willis, some have suggested that the letters could be considered to stand for quaque die, meaning every day in Latin).) unveiled on 14 April 2004 and released on 26 May 2004. It revised the original N-Gage's physical design, being smaller and rounder, with other cosmetic changes on its face. It corrected the flaw of the original's cartridge slot placement with a more convenient one on the bottom of the device as opposed to behind the battery. This design also moved the earpiece to the face of the device, rather than on the side, as in the previous model.

Although it uses the same Symbian S60 software, some features available in the original system, such as MP3 playback, FM radio reception and USB connectivity, were removed from the new device. Later in August 2005 Nokia marketed the Silver Edition of N-Gage QD with a few cosmetic changes, and the replacement of the two specialist gaming buttons (5 and 7) with standard keys.

In October 2021, photos and information about a prototype for a cancelled hardware revision called the "N-Gage IC" were posted to the AtariAge and ObscureGamers forums by two independent collectors: Timo Weirich (Germany) and Leo Ashomko (Russia). The prototype is cosmetically similar to the base N-Gage QD but came with an integrated camera, a 123 MHz processor, Symbian OS 7.0 with Series 60 2nd Edition and USB mass storage as well as hardware MP3 decoding from the original model.

== Software and features ==
Besides its gaming capabilities, the N-Gage is a 2.5G GPRS data supporting Series 60 smartphone, running Symbian OS 6.1, with features similar to those of the Nokia 3650 (it does not have an integrated camera, however). It is able to run all Series 60 software (other than those that require a camera) and comes with the standard features such as an email client, WAP, and XHTML browser; it also supports Java MIDP (J2ME) applications. The N-Gage Classic is tri-band GSM on frequencies 900, 1800 and 1900; the N-Gage QD revision on the other hand was released in two dual-band variants for the American region and another for Eurasian markets. Furthermore, the QD runs the same software version despite Series 60 2nd Edition having already come out by the time this revision was developed. The original N-Gage includes MP3 and RealAudio/RealVideo playback, an FM radio tuner, and also supports MMS picture messaging. However the QD version removes MP3 and FM support.

Exclusive to the device was N-Gage Arena, an online service run in-house by Nokia which consisted of an online community where users could play against each other online on certain titles, chat and post on message boards, view and upload high scores on a global scoreboard, and receive game tips news.

== Game library ==
Before the launch of Nokia's first in-house N-Gage title, Pathway to Glory, a one-level demo was released to journalists to allow them to sample the game and understand the concepts behind the turn-based wargame. This demo was subsequently placed on the N-Gage.com website as a free download. Undaunted by the 16 MB download size, fans jumped on the Pathway to Glory demo. The success of the download paved the route for future titles. On 6 June 2006 Nokia announced that people also could buy the games digitally.

There are 58 full titles available for N-Gage. Two of the titles were not released in North America: Flo-Boarding (Germany and UK only) and Sega Rally (Australia and Brazil only). All but three titles (Payload, Snakes, Virtua Cop) were available for retail purchase. Payload only could be bought via the digital N-Gage store, Snakes was given out as a free file and Virtua Cop was cancelled. One more game was bundled with the N-Gage (on the Support CD): an exclusive version of Space Impact Evolution X, that was later made available to Symbian S60v2 phones. Other than N-Gage titles, the device supports native Series 60 games and Java ME applets written specifically for Series 60.

== Reception and legacy ==
Pocket Kingdom: Own the World received a handful of glowing reviews when it was released, and Pathway to Glory was Nokia's first self-published success. These games came perhaps too late to have much effect in improving the perception of the N-Gage hardware itself in the eyes of consumers or press. Nokia had projections of at least 6 million sold decks in three years instead of only 3 million.

It was also noted that although Nokia touted the device as a handheld game console, it was in reality a standard Nokia Symbian Series 60 1st Edition smartphone in a different form factor and without any enhanced hardware chips for gaming capability. Pirated games released on the platform could be run as normal on devices of the period such as Nokia 3650.

Apple had the Newton. Sony struck out with the Betamax. I.B.M. blew it with the PCJr. Every technology giant has one or two failed products it would rather the world forget. But Nokia, the world’s largest cellphone manufacturer, wants everyone to remember its most famous misfire, the 2003 taco-shaped video game-cellphone hybrid, the N-Gage.

— Brad Stone, The New York Times, about the introduction of N-Gage 2.0 in 2007

The "N-Gage" brand name still had a poor reputation within the gaming media and among the few consumers who recognized the N-Gage brand, due to the weakness of the system's first games and the original model's limitations. Despite this, Nokia attempted another shot at N-Gage in 2007, which itself would last only two years.

=== Sales ===
In 2004, Nokia claimed in a press release that it had shipped its millionth deck, represented as a company milestone despite falling short of the company's initial projection of six million decks by the end of 2004. However, this number shipped does not give a reliable picture of the actual sales of the deck. Nokia ultimately shipped over 2 million N-Gage decks by 2007.

There is some disagreement in sources about the actual number of N-Gage decks sold. Nokia initially claimed 400,000 sales in the first two weeks the deck was available. However, independent market research firms Chart-Track and Arcadia Research claimed that the N-Gage had sold only 5,000 decks in the United States in that time, and 800 decks in the UK. German magazine GamePro talked about 15.000 sold units by mid 2004 in Germany. Critics suggested Nokia was counting the number of decks shipped to retailers, not the number actually purchased by consumers. Nokia later admitted this was the truth.

=== N-Gage 2.0 ===
The new N-Gage, also referred to as N-Gage Next Gen or N-Gage 2.0, saw a change in concept as Nokia explained to the world during E3 2005 that they were planning on putting N-Gage inside several of their smartphone devices, rather than releasing a specific device. In August 2007, the new N-Gage platform was finalised and was released in April 2008. It was compatible on many Symbian S60 smartphones with hardware acceleration capability. The service was discontinued in October 2009.

== See also ==
- Nokia 3300, 2003 model with a similar design to N-Gage.
- Nokia N81, Nokia N96, and Nokia N79/N85, later Nokia smartphones supporting N-Gage 2.0 platform.
- Scalable Network Application Package (SNAP), N-Gage Arena-like service designed by Nokia and Sega for Java-based games.
- Xperia Play, a similar product that combined mobile telephony with gaming.
