= List of black video game characters =

A study was published in 2009 by the University of Southern California called: "The virtual census: representations of gender, race and age in video games" and it showed that Black characters appear in video games in proportion to their numbers in the 2000 US census data, but mainly in sports games and in titles that reinforce stereotypes. Following is a list of Black video game characters, excluding sports and music titles. The game character roles are either a player character (PC) or a non-player character (NPC).

== Before 2000 ==
Character	Game	Release date	Role	Nationality	Notes	Ref.
Julius Erving (Dr. J)	One on One: Dr. J vs. Larry Bird	1982				
Kid Quick	Punch-Out!!	1984			Appeared in the Arcade version of Punch-Out!!	
Mr. Sandman	Punch-Out!!	1984				
Roadblock	G.I. Joe: A Real American Hero	1985	PC	American		
Edgar	Quartet	1986				
Doc Louis	Punch-Out!!	1987			First appeared in the NES version of Punch-Out!!!	
Birdie	Street Fighter	1987		American		
Celie	The Colonel's Bequest	1989				
Moja	Legend of the Ghost Lion	1989				
Storm	X-Men; X-Men: Gamesmaster's Legacy; Marvel vs. Capcom 2: New Age of Heroes; X-Men: Mutant Academy 2; Marvel Nemesis: Rise of the Imperfects; Marvel: Ultimate Alliance, etc.	1989, 1995, 2000, 2005, 2006	PC		Storm has appeared in numerous games	
Axel Foley	Beverly Hills Cop	1990				
Michael Max	Fatal Fury	1991				
Balrog	Street Fighter II: The World Warrior	1991		American		
Adam Hunter	Streets of Rage	1991	PC			
Eddie "Skate" Hunter	Streets of Rage 2	1992	PC		Also known as Sammy Hunter	
Ernie Leach	The Dagger of Amon Ra	1992				
SCAT member Collins	Night Trap	1992	NPC			
Pawnshop Owner	King's Quest VI	1992	NPC			
Watchman Toussaint Gervais	Gabriel Knight: Sins of the Fathers	1993				
Jax Briggs	Mortal Kombat II	1993		American		
Alvin Hooper (Yo Money)	Police Quest: Open Season	1993				
Nicolette	Police Quest: Open Season	1993				
Raymond Jones	Police Quest: Open Season	1993				
Dee Jay	Super Street Fighter II: The New Challengers	1993	PC	Jamaican		
Jeffry McWild	Virtua Fighter	1993	PC			
Nick Fury	The Punisher; Marvel Super Hero Squad Online; Marvel Puzzle Quest; Marvel Contest of Champions; Disney Infinity 2.0; Disney Infinity 3.0; Marvel: Future Fight; Marvel Strike Force;	1993, 2011, 2013, 2014, 2014, 2015, 2015, 2018	PC		Nick Fury has appeared in numerous games; he is not always depicted as black	
Kahlil	Bebe's Kids	1994				
LaShawn	Bebe's Kids	1994				
T.J. Combo	Killer Instinct	1994				
Sheana	Tough Guy	1994	PC			
Lucky Glauber	The King of Fighters '94	1994				
Heavy-D!	The King of Fighters '94	1994				
Colonel	Shaq Fu	1994				
Voodoo	Shaq Fu	1994	PC			
Cyrax	Mortal Kombat 3	1995	PC	Botsvanian		
Grace	Fighting Vipers	1995				
Bruce Irvin	Tekken 2	1995				
Zack	Dead or Alive	1996				
Maya	Killer Instinct	1996				
Kenneth J. Sullivan	Resident Evil	1996				
Barret Wallace	Final Fantasy VII	1997				
Taurus	Interstate '82	1997				
Eddy Gordo	Tekken 3	1997	PC			
Tiger Jackson	Tekken 3	1997	PC			
Kai	Mortal Kombat 4	1997	PC			
Boman Delgado	Rival Schools: United by Fate	1997				
Dudley	Street Fighter III: New Generation	1997	PC	Britain		
Elena	Street Fighter III: New Generation	1997		Kenyan		
Sean Matsuda	Street Fighter III: New Generation	1997	PC	Brazilian		
Eli Vance	Half-Life, Half-Life 2	1998, 2004		American		
Marvin Branagh	Resident Evil 2	1998				
Donald Anderson	Metal Gear Solid	1998			DARPA chief	
Mohammed Avdol	JoJo's Bizarre Adventure	1998	PC	Egyptian		
Laheesa	1 on 1	1998	PC			
Mash	1 on 1	1998	PC			
War Machine	Marvel vs. Capcom: Clash of Super Heroes; Marvel vs. Capcom 2: New Age of Heroes; Iron Man 2; Marvel Super Hero Squad Online; Marvel Avengers Alliance; Lego Marvel Super Heroes; Marvel Heroes; Marvel Contest of Champions; etc.	1998, 2000, 2010, 2011, 2012, 2013, 2013, 2014	PC		War Machine has appeared in numerous other games	
Hauser	Suikoden II, Genso Suikogaiden Vol. 1.	1998, 2000	PC, NPC			
Akuji	Akuji the Heartless	1999	PC			
Afro Thunder	Ready 2 Rumble Boxing	1999	PC			
Seth	The King of Fighters '99 Evolution, The King of Fighters	1999, 2000	PC			
Michael LeRoi (Shadow Man)	Shadow Man	1999	PC			
Mark Kimberley	Shenmue	1999				
D'arci Stern	Urban Chaos	1999				
Tom Johnson	Shenmue, Shenmue II, Shenmue III	1999, 2001, 2019				

== 2000s ==
Character	Game	Release date	Role	Nationality	Notes	Ref.
Blade	Blade; Blade II; Marvel: Ultimate Alliance; Marvel Puzzle Quest; Marvel Heroes; Marvel Contest of Champions; Lego Marvel Super Heroes 2; Marvel Ultimate Alliance 3: The Black Order, etc.	2000, 2002, 2006, 2013, 2014, 2017, 2019	PC		Blade has appeared in numerous games	
Valygar Corthala	Baldur's Gate II: Shadows of Amn and Baldur's Gate II: Enhanced Edition	2000, 2013				
Samuel Williams	Desperados: Wanted Dead or Alive	2001				
Sergeant Major Avery Junior Johnson	Halo: The Fall of Reach	2001				
Fortune	Metal Gear Solid 2: Sons of Liberty	2001	NPC			
Vanessa Lewis	Virtua Fighter 4	2001				
Lance Vance	Grand Theft Auto: Vice City and Grand Theft Auto: Vice City Stories	2002	NPC			
Victor Vance	Grand Theft Auto: Vice City and Grand Theft Auto: Vice City Stories	2002	NPC			
Agent J	Men in Black II: Alien Escape	2002	PC			
Irving Lambert	Tom Clancy's Splinter Cell	2002				
Don Donatelouse (Dona-dona)	Way of the Samurai	2002	PC, NPC			
James Heller	Prototype, Prototype 2	2002, 2012	PC			
Lisa Hamilton	Dead or Alive Xtreme Beach Volleyball	2003				
Ayme	Baten Kaitos: Eternal Wings and the Lost Ocean	2003				
Jim Chapman	Resident Evil Outbreak	2003				
Mark Wilkins	Resident Evil Outbreak	2003				
John Dalton	Unreal II: The Awakening	2003				
Sig	Jak II; Jak 3; Jak X: Combat Racing	2003, 2004, 2005	NPC			
Carl "CJ" Johnson	Grand Theft Auto: San Andreas	2004	PC	American		
Kendl Johnson	Grand Theft Auto: San Andreas	2004	NPC	American		
Madd Dogg	Grand Theft Auto: San Andreas	2004	NPC	American		
OG Loc	Grand Theft Auto: San Andreas	2004	NPC	American		
Sean Johnson	Grand Theft Auto: San Andreas	2004	NPC	American		
Big Smoke	Grand Theft Auto: San Andreas	2004	NPC	American		
Alyx Vance	Half-Life 2, Half-Life: Alyx	2004, 2020	PC	Malay-American		
Darrius	Mortal Kombat: Deception	2004	PC			
Aisha	Rumble Roses	2004	PC	American		
Torque	The Suffering	2004				
Raven	Tekken 5	2004	PC			
Tyler Miles	Fahrenheit	2005				
Garcian Smith	Killer7	2005				
50 Cent	50 Cent: Bulletproof and 50 Cent: Blood on the Sand	2005, 2009	PC			
Mace Windu	LEGO Star Wars: The Video Game; LEGO Star Wars II: The Original Trilogy; LEGO Star Wars III: The Clone Wars	2005, 2006, 2011	PC			
Cyborg	Teen Titans; Injustice: Gods Among Us; Infinite Crisis; Injustice 2, etc.	2005, 2013, 2014, 2017	PC		Cyborg has appeared in numerous games	
Brad Garrison	Dead Rising	2006	NPC			
Kian Alvane	Dreamfall: The Longest Journey	2006				
Fran	Final Fantasy XII	2006				
Matt	Wii Sports	2006	PC			
John Stewart	Justice League Heroes; Lego Batman 3: Beyond Gotham; Lego DC Super-Villains, etc.	2006, 2014, 2018	PC		John Stewart has appeared in numerous games	
Augustus Cole	Gears of War, Gears of War: Judgment, Gears of War 4, Gears 5, etc.	2006, 2013, 2016, 2019				
Luke Cage (Power Man)	Marvel: Ultimate Alliance, Marvel Heroes, Lego Marvel's Avengers	2006, 2013, 2016	PC, NPC			
Black Panther	Marvel: Ultimate Alliance; Marvel: Ultimate Alliance 2; Marvel Super Hero Squad Online; Marvel Avengers Alliance; Marvel Heroes; Marvel Contest of Champions; etc.	2006, 2011, 2012, 2013, 2014	PC		Black Panther has appeared in numerous games	
Staff Sgt. Griggs	Call of Duty 4: Modern Warfare	2007				
Laurence Barnes (Prophet)	Crysis	2007				
Shinobu Jacobs	No More Heroes	2007				
David Anderson	Mass Effect	2007				
Demoman	Team Fortress 2	2007	PC	Scottish		
Zach Hammond	Dead Space	2008	NPC			
Three Dog	Fallout 3	2008				
Louis	Left 4 Dead	2008	PC	American		
Crying Wolf	Metal Gear Solid 4: Guns of the Patriots	2008	PC			
Drebin 893	Metal Gear Solid 4: Guns of the Patriots	2008	NPC			
Dwayne	Grand Theft Auto IV	2008				
Disco Kid	Punch-Out!!	2008				
Dona	Way of the Samurai 3	2008	NPC			
Lucius Fox	Lego Batman: The Videogame	2008	PC		Lucius Fox has appeared in numerous games	
Master Sergeant Matthew "Coops" Cooper	ARMA 2	2009				
Roland	Borderlands	2009				
Sergeant Foley	Call of Duty: Modern Warfare 2	2009				
Sazh Katzroy	Final Fantasy XIII	2009				
Romeo	Halo 3: ODST	2009				
Ekko	League of Legends	2009	PC			
Lucian	League of Legends	2009	PC			
Senna	League of Legends	2009	PC			
Pyke	League of Legends	2009	PC			
Rell	League of Legends	2009	PC			
K'Sante	League of Legends	2009	PC			
Ambessa Metarda	League of Legends	2009	NPC			
Mel Metarda	League of Legends	2009				
Aaron Cash	Batman: Arkham Asylum	2009		American		
Rodin	Bayonetta	2009	NPC	British		
Coach	Left 4 Dead 2	2009	PC	American		
Rochelle	Left 4 Dead 2	2009	PC	American		
Isaac Washington	The House of the Dead: Overkill	2009				
Black Baron	MadWorld	2009				
Josh Stone	Resident Evil 5	2009		American		
Afro Samurai	Afro Samurai	2009	PC			
Sheva Alomar	Resident Evil 5	2009		West African		
Commander Gore	Shin Megami Tensei: Strange Journey	2009				

== 2010s ==
Character	Game	Release date	Role	Nationality	Notes	Ref.
Charles Milton Porter	BioShock 2: Minerva's Den	2010				
Mad Jack	Heavy Rain	2010	NPC	American		
Lenora	Pokémon Black and White	2010	NPC	American		
Marshal	Pokémon Black and White	2010	NPC	American		
Iris	Pokémon Black and White	2010				
Nathan Copeland	No More Heroes 2: Desperate Struggle	2010				
Jacob Taylor	Mass Effect 2	2010				
Anthony Higgs	Metroid: Other M	2010				
Sam B	Dead Island	2011				
Yelena Fedorva	Deus Ex: Human Revolution	2011		Russian		
Nix	Infamous 2	2011		American		
Nazir	The Elder Scrolls V: Skyrim	2011				
Nazeem	The Elder Scrolls V: Skyrim	2011				
Blacker Baron	Anarchy Reigns	2011				
Miles Morales	Marvel Super Hero Squad Online; Marvel Avengers Alliance; Spider-Man Unlimited; Marvel Contest of Champions; Marvel: Future Fight; Lego Marvel's Avengers; etc.	2011, 2012, 2014, 2014, 2015, 2016	PC		Miles Morales has appeared in numerous games	
Aveline de Grandpré	Assassin's Creed III: Liberation	2012	PC	French		
Sir Hammerlock	Borderlands 2	2012				
Tyrael	Diablo III	2012				
Basilio	Fire Emblem Awakening	2012				
Roy Boateng (Big Bo)	Binary Domain	2012				
Clementine	The Walking Dead	2012	PC	American		
Lee Everett	The Walking Dead	2012		American		
Steven Cortez	Mass Effect	2012	NPC			
Raymond Valentine	Hitman Absolution	2012				
Hog Rider	Clash of Clans	2012	NPC			
Emmett Graves	Starhawk	2012				
Lieutenant Alphanso Adams	Spec Ops: The Line	2012				
Vixen (Mari McCabe)	Lego Batman 2: DC Super Heroes, Lego Batman 3: Beyond Gotham, Lego DC Super-Villains	2012, 2014, 2018	PC		Also in other games as an NPC	
Adéwalé	Assassin's Creed	2013	NPC	Trinidadian		
Warden Martin Joseph	Batman: Arkham Origins	2013	NPC	American		
Hexxat	Baldur's Gate II: Enhanced Edition	2013	PC			
Daisy Fitzroy	BioShock Infinite	2013				
Franklin Clinton	Grand Theft Auto V	2013	PC	American		
Marlow Briggs	Marlow Briggs and the Mask of Death	2013				
Henry	The Last of Us	2013	NPC	American		
Marlene	The Last of Us	2013	NPC	American		
Riley Abel	The Last of Us	2013	NPC	American		
Sam	The Last of Us	2013	NPC	American		
Bryan Roses	Killer Is Dead	2013				
Nilin	Remember Me	2013				
Grant	Pokémon X and Y	2013				
Wonder-Black	The Wonderful 101	2013				
Mister Terrific	Injustice: Gods Among Us	2013	NPC			
Aurelia Hammerlock	Borderlands: The Pre-Sequel	2014				
Sergeant Cormack	Call of Duty: Advanced Warfare	2014				
Knox	Call of Duty: Advanced Warfare	2014				
Delrin Barris	Dragon Age: Inquisition	2014				
Vivienne	Dragon Age: Inquisition	2014				
Firestorm	Lego Batman 3: Beyond Gotham; Injustice 2; Lego DC Super-Villains	2014, 2017, 2018	PC			
Preston Garvey	Fallout 4	2015		American		
Principal Ray Wells	Life Is Strange and Life Is Strange: Before the Storm	2015		American		
Pallegina	Pillars of Eternity and Pillars of Eternity II: Deadfire	2015				
Qhira	Heroes of the Storm	2015				
Jacqui Briggs	Mortal Kombat X	2015		American		
Master Raven	Tekken 7	2015				
Leroy Smith	Tekken 7	2015		American		
Matt	Until Dawn	2015		American		
Merlin	Crypt of the Necrodancer	2015	NPC			
Philip Ojomo	Dead by Daylight	2016	PC	Nigerian	Killer known as "The Wraith"	
Lisa Sherwood	Dead by Daylight	2016	PC	American	Killer known as "The Hag"	
Herman Carter	Dead by Daylight	2016	PC	American	Killer known as "The Doctor"	
Joey	Dead by Daylight	2016	PC	Canadian	Killer who is a part of "The Legion"	
Portia Maya	Dead by Daylight	2016	PC	Caribbean	Killer who is The Houndmaster	
Claudette Morel	Dead by Daylight	2016	PC	Canadian	A survivor	
Adam Francis	Dead by Daylight	2016	PC	Jamaican	A survivor	
Rogue	Nuclear Throne	2016				
Lincoln Clay	Mafia III	2016	PC	American		
Baptiste	Overwatch	2016	PC	Haitian		
Doomfist	Overwatch	2016	PC	Nigerian		
Lúcio	Overwatch	2016	PC	Brazilian		
Olivia Hall	Hitman	2016				
Kalvin Ritter	Hitman	2016				
Kiawe	Pokémon Sun & Moon	2016	NPC	Hawaiian		
Olivia	Pokémon Sun & Moon	2016	NPC	Hawaiian		
Demetrius	Stardew Valley	2016				
Maru	Stardew Valley	2016				
Nadine Ross	Uncharted 4: A Thief's End	2016				
Menat	Street Fighter V	2016		Egyptian		
Marcus Holloway	Watch Dogs 2	2017		American		
Twintelle	Arms	2017				
Marcus Howard	Call of Duty WW2	2017				
Mat Sella	Dream Daddy	2017				
Sylens	Horizon Zero Dawn and Horizon Forbidden West	2017	NPC			
Black Lightning (Jefferson Pierce)	Injustice 2; Lego DC Super-Villains	2017, 2018	PC		Black Lightning has appeared in numerous games	
Liam Kosta	Mass Effect: Andromeda	2017				
Dayo Igwe	Prey	2017				
Beatrix LeBeau	Slime Rancher	2017				
Marina	Splatoon 2	2017				
Black Manta (David Hyde)	DC Unchained; Fortnite Battle Royale; Injustice 2	2017, 2017, 2018	PC	American	Black Manta has appeared in numerous games	
Mira	Donut County	2018	PC			
Dandara	Dandara	2018	PC			
Lenny Summers	Red Dead Redemption 2	2018				
Tilly Jackson	Red Dead Redemption 2	2018				
Zoe Washington	Hitman 2	2018	NPC			
Sophia Washington	Hitman 2	2018	NPC			
Stone	Hitman: Sniper Assassin	2018	PC			
Winston Smith	Return of the Obra Dinn	2018	NPC	American		
Zasalamel	Soulcalibur VI	2018	PC	Sumerian		
Alex	The Dark Pictures Anthology: Man of Medan	2019				
Brad	The Dark Pictures Anthology: Man of Medan	2019				
Félicité "Fliss" DuBois	The Dark Pictures Anthology: Man of Medan	2019				
J.D. Morrison	Devil May Cry 5	2019				
Bangalore	Apex Legends	2019				
Nessa	Pokémon Sword and Shield	2019	NPC	British	Water-type gym leader of Galar	
Leon	Pokémon Sword and Shield	2019	NPC	British	Champion of the Galar region	
Hop	Pokémon Sword and Shield	2019	NPC	British	Leon's little brother	
Maria	Assemble with Care	2019	PC			
Carmen	Assemble with Care	2019	NPC			
Helena	Assemble with Care	2019	NPC			

== 2020s ==
Character	Game	Release date	Role	Nationality	Notes	Ref.
Cherry Hunter	Streets of Rage 4	2020	PC			
Sunny	Calico (video game)	2020	NPC			
Colt Vahn	Deathloop	2021	PC			
Julianna Blake	Deathloop	2021	PC			
Antón Castillo	Far Cry 6	2021	NPC			
O'saa	Fear & Hunger 2: Termina	2022	PC, NPC			
Ryme	Pokémon Scarlet & Violet	2022	NPC	Spanish		
Tyme	Pokémon Scarlet & Violet	2022	NPC	Spanish		
Dolores	The King of Fighters XV	2022	PC			
Taion	Xenoblade Chronicles 3	2022	PC			
Hepha	Time to Morp	2023	NPC			
Alfre Holland	Forspoken	2023	PC	American		
Estelle	Season: A Letter to the Future	2023	PC			
Wyll Ravengard	Baldur's Gate 3	2023	PC		One of ten companions the player can choose to recruit. He is also PC as an Origin character.	
Kimberly	Street Fighter 6	2023	PC	American		
Deadshot (Floyd Lawton)	Suicide Squad: Kill the Justice League	2024	PC	American		
Amanda Waller	Suicide Squad: Kill the Justice League	2024	NPC	American		
John Stewart (Green Lantern)	Suicide Squad: Kill the Justice League	2024	NPC	American		
Prism	Dispatch	2025	NPC	American		
Merlin	Rift of the Necrodancer	2025	NPC			
Keyes	Date Everything!	2025	NPC	Nigeria		
Curt	Date Everything!	2025	NPC			
Rod	Date Everything!	2025	NPC			
Fantina	Date Everything!	2025	NPC			
Henry Hoove	Date Everything!	2025	NPC			
Prissy Plastique	Date Everything!	2025	NPC			
Phoenicia	Date Everything!	2025	NPC			
Rainey	Date Everything!	2025	NPC			
Reggie	Date Everything!	2025	NPC			
Stefan	Date Everything!	2025	NPC			
Teddy	Date Everything!	2025	NPC			
Telly	Date Everything!	2025	NPC			
Tyrell	Date Everything!	2025	NPC			
Willi	Date Everything!	2025	NPC			
Winnifred	Date Everything!	2025	NPC			

== See also ==
- List of black animated characters
- List of black superheroes
- List of Native American video game characters
- Lists of black people
- Race and video games
