= List of mobile games listed among the best =

Video games notable for positive reception

This is a list of mobile games that have appeared on various publications' lists of "best" or "greatest" mobile games of all time. Each game is included on best-of lists from at least 3 different publications assembled by editiorial staff or expert panels and not limited in scope by era, genre, or platform.

== List ==
There are currently 56 games in this list.

Game	Genre	Release	Developer	Publisher	Original platform(s)	Ref.
80 Days	Interactive fiction	2014	Inkle		iOS	(Note: 80 Days:)
Alto's Odyssey	Endless runner	2018	Team Alto	Snowman, Noodlecake Studios	iOS, tvOS	(Note: Alto's Odyssey:)
Among Us	Social deduction	2018	Innersloth		Android, iOS	(Note: Among Us:)
Angry Birds	Puzzle	2009	Rovio Entertainment		Maemo, iOS	(Note: Angry Birds:)
Angry Birds Star Wars	Puzzle	2012	Rovio Entertainment		iOS, Android	(Note: Angry Birds Star Wars:)
Balatro	Roguelike deck- building	2024	LocalThunk	Playstack	macOS	(Note: Balatro:)
Bloons TD 6	Tower defense	2018	Ninja Kiwi		iOS, Android	(Note: Bloons TD 6:)
Call of Duty: Mobile	First-person shooter	2019	TiMi Studio Group	Activision, Garena, VNG Games	iOS, Android	(Note: Call of Duty: Mobile:)
Canabalt	Endless runner	2009	Adam Saltsman	Semi Secreft Software, RGCD, Beatshapers, Kittehface Software	Browser	(Note: Canabalt:)
Candy Crush Saga	Tile-matching	2012	King		Browser	(Note: Candy Crush Saga:)
Clash of Clans	Real-time strategy	2012	Supercell		iOS, Android, Windows	(Note: Clash of Clans:)
Clash Royale	Real-time strategy	2016	Supercell		iOS, Android, PC	(Note: Clash Royale:)
Cut the Rope	Puzzle	2010	ZeptoLab	Chillingo	iOS	(Note: Cut the Rope:)
Dead Cells	Roguelike	2018	Motion Twin	Motion Twin, Playdigious	Linux, macOS, Nintendo Switch, PS4, PC, Xbox One	(Note: Dead Cells:)
Device 6	Interactive fiction	2013	Simogo		iOS	(Note: Device 6:)
Draw Something	Pictionary	2012	OMGPop		iOS	(Note: Draw Something:)
Flappy Bird	Casual	2013	.Gears		iOS	(Note: Flappy Bird:)
Florence	Minigame compilation	2018	Mountains	Annapurna Interactive	iOS	(Note: Florence:)
Fruit Ninja	Arcade	2010	Halfbrick Studios		iOS, iPod Touch	(Note: Fruit Ninja:)
Game Dev Story	Business simulation	1997	Kairosoft		PC	(Note: Game Dev Story:)
Genshin Impact	Action role-playing	2020	miHoYo	miHoYo, HoYoverse	Android, iOS, PS4, PC	(Note: Genshin Impact: ´)
Gorogoa	Puzzle	2017	Jason Roberts	Annapurna Interactive	iOS	(Note: Gorogoa:)
Hearthstone	Digital collectable card	2014	Blizzard Entertainment		PC, Mac	(Note: Hearthstone:)
Hello Kitty Island Adventure	Life simulation	2023	Sunblink		iOS, macOS, Apple TV	(Note: Hello Kitty Island Adventure:)
Hitman Go	Puzzle	2014	Square Enix Montreal	Square Enix	iOS	(Note: Hitman Go:)
Honkai: Star Rail	Turn-based role-playing	2023	miHoYo	miHoYo, HoYoverse	PC, iOS, Android	(Note: Honkai: Star Rail:)
Jetpack Joyride	Endless runner	2011	Halfbrick Studios		iOS	(Note: Jetpack Joyride:)
Lara Croft Go	Puzzle	2015	Square Enix Montreal	Square Enix	iOS, Android	(Note: Lara Croft Go:)
League of Legends: Wild Rift	MOBA	2020	Riot Games		Android, iOS, iPadOS	(Note: League of Legends: Wild Rift:)
Marvel Snap	Digital collectible card	2022	Second Dinner	Nuverse, Skystone Games	Android, iOS	(Note: Marvel Snap:)
Minecraft	Sandbox	2011	Mojang Studios		PC, Mac, Linux	(Note: Minecraft:)
Mini Metro	Puzzle	2015	Dinosaur Polo Club	Dinosaur Polo Club, Playdigious	PC, OS X, Linux	(Note: Mini Metro:)
Monument Valley	Puzzle	2014	Ustwo Games		iOS	(Note: Monument Valley:)
Monument Valley 2	Puzzle	2017	Ustwo Games		iOS	(Note: Monument Valley 2:)
Plants vs. Zombies	Tower defense	2009	PopCap Games		PC, MacOS	(Note: Plants vs. Zombies:)
Pokémon Go	Augemented reality	2016	Niantic, Scopely Explore	Niantic, Scopely	iOS, Android	(Note: Pokémon Go:)
Rayman Jungle Run	Platformer	2012	Pastagames	Ubisoft	iOS	(Note: Rayman Jungle Run:)
Reigns: Her Majesty	Strategy	2017	Nerial	Devolver Digital	iOS, Android	(Note: Reigns: Her Majesty:)
Ridiculous Fishing	Fishing	2013	Vlambeer		iOS	(Note: Ridiculous Fishing:)
The Room	Puzzle	2012	Fireproof Games	Fireproof Games, Team17	iOS	(Note: The Room:)
Slay the Spire	Roguelike deck-building game	2019	Mega Crit	Mega Crit, Humble Bundle	PC, macOS, Linux	(Note: Slay the Spire:)
Snake	Snake	1997	Taneli Armanto	Nokia	Nokia 6610	(Note: Snake:)
SpellTower	Puzzle	2011	Zach Gage	Noodlecake Studios	iOS	(Note: SpellTower:)
Stardew Valley	Farm life simulation	2016	ConcernedApe	Chucklefish	PC	(Note: Stardew Valley:)
Subway Surfers	Endless runner	2012	Kiloo, SYBO		iOS	(Note: Subway Surfers:)
Super Hexagon	Action	2012	Terry Cavanagh		iOS	(Note: Super Hexagon:)
Superbrothers: Sword & Sworcery EP	Action-adventure	2011	Capybara Games		iPad	(Note: Superbrothers: Sword & Sworcery EP:)
Temple Run	Endless runner	2011	Imangi Studios		iOS	(Note: Temple Run:)
Tetris	Puzzle	1984	Alexey Pajitnov	Elorg	Electronika 60	(Note: Tetris:)
Threes	Puzzle	2014	Sirvo		iOS	(Note: Threes:)
Triple Town	Strategy	2010	Spry Fox		Amazon Kindle	(Note: Triple Town:)
Vampire Survivors	Roguelike	2022	Poncle		Mac, PC	(Note: Vampire Survivors:)
Waking Mars	Platformer	2012	Tiger Style		iOS	(Note: Waking Mars:)
Wayward Souls	Dungeon crawler	2014	Rocketcat Games		iOS	(Note: Wayward Souls:)
Where's My Water?	Puzzle	2011	Creature Feep	Disney Mobile	iOS, Android	(Note: Where's My Water?:)
Words with Friends	Word game	2009	Zynga		iOS	(Note: Words with Friends:)

== Publications ==
The reference numbers in the notes section show which of the 22 selected publications list the mobile games.

- 300Mind – 2024
- British GQ – 2021
- CNBC – 2016
- CNET – 2010, 2025
- Destructoid – 2023
- Dexerto – 2025
- Digital Trends – 2025
- Esquire – 2022
- The Guardian – 2013, 2021
- Game Informer – 2012
- Game Rant – 2023
- TheGamer – 2019
- Gamespot – 2024
- IGN – 2018
- PhoneArena – 2015
- Pocket Gamer – 2016
- Pocket Tactics – 2025
- Radio Times – 2024
- Screen Rant – 2024
- The Standard – 2024
- Vg247 – 2024
- Wired – 2024
- USA Today – 2021

== See also ==
Mobile games

- List of most-played mobile games by player count

Other art forms

- List of television shows considered the best
- List of anime series listed among the best
- List of films voted the best
- List of video games listed among the best
