= List of blacks =

List of blacks may refer to:

- Lists of black people
- Shades of black
