= Monument Valley (video game) =

Puzzle video game

- App icon
- Developer: Ustwo Games
- Publisher: Ustwo Games
- Director: Neil McFarland
- Producer: Dan Gray
- Designer: Ken Wong
- Programmers: Peter Pashley; Manesh Mistry; Van Le
- Artists: Ken Wong; David Fernández Huerta
- Engine: Unity
- Platforms: iOS; Android; Windows Phone; Windows; Nintendo Switch; PlayStation 4; PlayStation 5; Xbox One; Xbox Series X/S
- Release: iOS; April 3, 2014; Android; May 14, 2014; Windows Phone; April 30, 2015; Windows; July 12, 2022; Consoles; April 15, 2025
- Genre: Puzzle
- Mode: Single-player

Monument Valley is a 2014 puzzle and indie game by Ustwo Games. The player leads the princess Ida through mazes of optical illusions and impossible objects while manipulating the world around her to reach various platforms. Monument Valley was developed over ten months beginning in early 2013 based on concept drawings by company artist Ken Wong. Its visual style was inspired by Japanese prints, minimalist sculpture, and indie games Windosill, Fez, and Sword & Sworcery, and was compared by critics to M. C. Escher drawings and Echochrome.

After a closed beta test, Monument Valley was released for iOS on April 3, 2014, and was later ported to Android and Windows Phone. The game received generally favorable reviews. Critics praised its art and sound design, but noted its lack of difficulty and short length. The game is cited as one of the greatest mobile games ever made. It won a 2014 Apple Design Award, was named Apple's best iPad game of 2014, and sold over two million copies by January 2015; by May 2016, sales of the game exceeded 26 million.

Two expansions titled Forgotten Shores and Ida's (RED) Dream were released in 2014 and 2015, respectively. A sequel, Monument Valley 2, was released for both iOS and Android in 2017. Monument Valley+, an Apple Arcade exclusive, was released April 2, 2021. A PC version under the title Monument Valley: Panoramic Edition was released for Microsoft Windows in July 2022 and the game was later also released for Nintendo Switch, PlayStation 4, PlayStation 5, Xbox One and Xbox Series X and Series S in April 2025. A third game, Monument Valley 3, was released in December 2024.

== Gameplay ==
A screenshot of part of a level in Monument Valley

In Monument Valley, player character Princess Ida journeys through mazes of optical illusions and impossible objects, which are referred to as "sacred geometry" in-game, as she journeys to be forgiven for something. The game is presented in isometric view, and the player interacts with the environment to find hidden passages as Ida progresses to the map's exit. Each of the ten levels has a different central mechanic. Interactions include moving platforms and pillars and creating bridges. The player is indirectly cued through the game by design elements like color, and directly cued by crow people, who block Ida's path. Critics compared the game's visual style to a vibrant M. C. Escher drawing and Echochrome. The game includes a camera mode where the player can roam the level to compose screenshots. It includes filters similar to those of Instagram.

== Development ==
Monument Valley was developed by Ustwo, a digital design firm founded in 2004 that has produced iPhone apps since 2007. Their Whale Trail game received millions of downloads, and their other apps include design app Granimator and photo sharing app Rando. Monument Valley was conceived as a touch game for tablets. Its development began in the beginning of 2013, and lasted 10 months. It was developed under the working title, Tower of Illusion. It began with a piece of concept art drawn in the style of M. C. Escher, and the final design did not deviate far from this original. Ustwo management did not give the development team a timeline or budget, and instead told them to focus on "making a high-quality product". Games development is not a large portion of Ustwo's revenue, so the company focuses its games development on producing "great products" that reflect well on the company, rather than highly profitable apps.

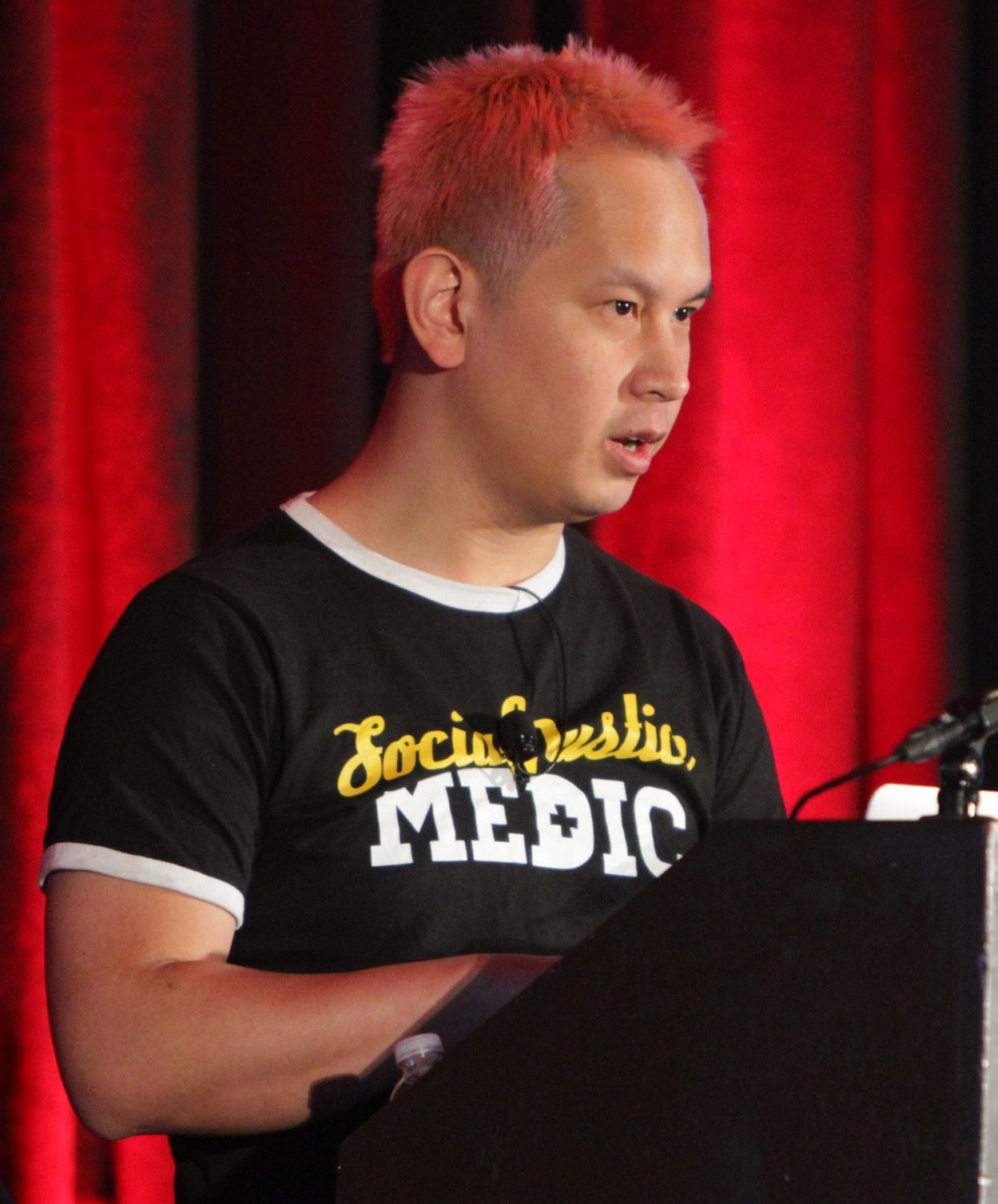
Ken Wong, the lead designer for Ustwo, at the 2015 Game Developers Conference

Of the art style, game designer and artist Ken Wong said he aspired to make each frame of the gameplay worthy of public display. The project began as Wong's concept drawings before it became a game project. The visual style was inspired by Japanese prints, minimalist sculpture, and indie games Windosill, Fez, and Superbrothers: Sword & Sworcery EP. Wong added that the gameplay was designed to let the player find the object of the game through exploration, without direct guidance. The game uses colors to signify where the player can interact, similar to Mirror's Edge. Wong compared the gameplay experience to a cross between the wonder of a toy shop and the world of The Lion, the Witch, and the Wardrobe, and its story to a symbolic "song" rather than a narrative book. The game was designed to be completed by most players, a style uncommon for games designed for popular audiences. It was intended to be a "premium experience" rather than a difficult challenge.

The game's soundtrack features music by Stafford Bawler, Obfusc, and Grigori. A limited edition vinyl two-volume recording was released by Ustwo and iam8bit in 2016, which includes the music from the main game and its two expansions.

The game was in beta as of December 2013, where it had over 1,000 testers and the average finish time was 90 minutes. It was planned as an iPad exclusive. The game was initially released for iOS on April 3, 2014, and the company recouped their cost of development within the first two weeks of release. An Android port went through two beta tests and was later released on May 14, 2014. More levels were in development, as of April 2014. Ustwo said they were adding the levels for "artistic reasons", such as ideas they wanted to try but could not fit into the original release. Wong stated that, with consumer interest, the company would consider porting the game to other platforms. The game's technical director said that the game was "not very difficult to port" since it was written in the Unity game engine. But as the game was built with a portrait (vertical) screen orientation in mind, the developer had difficulty converting the game for devices with landscape-oriented (horizontal) screens, such as the YouTube trailer video format and the PlayStation Vita. Jennifer Estaris said in 2022 that they had figured out how to adapt the game for landscape orientation, with plans to release the title for personal computers later that year. The two games (with their DLC) subtitled Panoramic Edition and The Panoramic Collection, containing both games and their DLC, was released on Windows on 12 July 2022. The game was released for Nintendo Switch, PlayStation 4, PlayStation 5, Xbox One and Xbox Series X and Series S on April 15, 2025.

An add-on expansion, entitled Forgotten Shores, was released for iOS devices on November 12, 2014, on the App Store on November 20, 2014 and on Google Play Store on November 24, 2014. This adds eight additional levels to the ten in the original game. An expansion pack titled Ida's (RED) Dream was available from June 25, 2015 for purchase for a limited time as part of Apple's Apps for (PRODUCT) RED initiative. This expansion pack could be played with or without the additional purchase of Forgotten Shores, featuring Ida in a red outfit and several new puzzles. Both DLC are automatically included in the rereleases.

== Reception ==
Reception

Aggregate score
Aggregator	Score
Metacritic	89/100

Review scores
Publication	Score
Edge	8/10
Game Informer	8/10
Pocket Gamer	9/10
Polygon	9/10
TouchArcade	5/5

The game received "generally favorable" reviews, according to video game review score aggregator Metacritic. It immediately went to the top of the App Store paid apps chart, where it stayed for at least a month based on strong reviews and word of mouth. It was chosen as an App Store Editor's Choice and later both received a 2014 Apple Design Award and was named Apple's best iPad game of 2014. Pocket Gamer gave the game their gold award, and their Harry Slater wrote that there was "nothing else like Monument Valley on the App Store".

Multiple reviewers cited the art and sound design as exceptional. Edge added that the sound design's addition of "deep rumbles" and environmental "clicks" gave the game the feeling of Tomb Raider's moving "ancient mechanisms". TouchArcade's Shaun Musgrave called the visuals "almost impossibly gorgeous", and Wired wrote that the game "might be the most beautiful iPad game of 2014". Creative Review called the game's puzzles "clever" and appreciated the developers' attention to detail.

While Polygon's Danielle Riendeau praised the puzzle design, other critics noted its lack of difficulty and short length. Riendeau wrote that the puzzles solutions always felt intuitive and never felt frustrating. She found "everything" about the game to be "soothing, almost hypnotic". Edge thought that the game did not present a "genuine" challenge, and that the puzzles did not "find fresh ways to confound and delight" until the final levels. The magazine compared the game to "assembling flat-pack furniture": straightforward in its process, but rewarding in its transformation. Harry Slater of Pocket Gamer wrote that the game was "almost breathtakingly unique". Riendeau said she finished the game in under three hours, and TouchArcade's Shaun Musgrave, who could not "even begin to imagine anyone getting stuck on ... the puzzles", put the game's length at "an hour and change". Jeff Marchiafava of Game Informer wanted more content. He was also unsatisfied with the game's narrative, which he found "obtuse" and "vague" to a fault. Musgrave of TouchArcade thought that while games that focus on experiences can be shorter, Monument Valley did not last long enough "for the mechanics to reach their full potential", though the time was "just about right" for the story.

Monument Valley sold 500,000 copies in a month, and one million copies in three months. In November 2014, the game had sold 1.4 million copies and by January 2015, the game had sold 2.4 million copies. In January 2015, Ustwo noted that the game had seen a large amount of software piracy, with 95% of the installs on Android and 60% on iOS devices coming from unpaid copies; the company asserted some of these may include users installing on multiple devices but believe the majority was through users that had not purchased the title. While these numbers were discouraging, the company asserted it will continue to develop premium titles for mobile devices. Despite the piracy, Ustwo stated they have exceeded $6 million in revenue from sales of the game as of mid-January 2015, exceeding the $1.4 million in development costs. By January 2016, USTwo reported that more than 24 million users have downloaded the game, the ten-fold increase from 2015 partially due to legitimate giveaways of the game through Apple's App Store, Google Play, and Amazon Underground. Of about seven million of the free downloads through Apple, about 35% of them purchased the "Forgotten Shores" expansion. Ustwo reported total sales over $14 million from 26 million copies by May 2016.

The game was named as a finalist for Innovation Award, Best Visual Art, and Best Handhold/Mobile Game for the 2015 Game Developers Choice Awards, and was an honorable mention for Best Design. During the 18th Annual D.I.C.E. Awards, the Academy of Interactive Arts & Sciences awarded Monument Valley with Outstanding Achievement in Art Direction, as well as nominations for Outstanding Achievement in Game Direction, Outstanding Innovation in Gaming, Mobile Game of the Year, and the D.I.C.E. Sprite Award. It won the 2015 International Mobile Gaming Awards' Grand Prix. The title won the BAFTA Video Game Awards for best "British Game" and "Mobile/Handheld Game", while nominated for "Best Game", "Artistic Achievement", and "Original Property" awards. At the 2014 National Academy of Video Game Trade Reviewers (NAVGTR) awards Monument Valley won the category Game, Special Class and was nominated for Game Design, New IP and Art Direction, Fantasy. Time magazine placed the game on their best of list while being Game Informer's "Editor's Choice" for "Best Mobile Exclusive".

== Legacy ==
The game was a "minor plot point" in the third season of House of Cards, in which Frank Underwood plays the game; he is inspired by video gamer reviewer Thomas Yates's elegant description of Monument Valley to bring the reviewer on as his biographer. According to the studio Ustwo, they were approached by Netflix about including the game in the story, and the studio readily agreed without any financial compensation. They made a specialized version of the game for the show to aid in filming and to meet a description of the game provided within the script for the first episode in which it appeared. Ustwo saw the opportunity to introduce the title to a different audience set, and saw an increase in sales as a result of this appearance. The game re-entered the top of the most download app charts on the major app stores a few days after the February 2015 release of the season on Netflix.

Monument Valley characters were added to the cast of Crossy Road in late 2015. Jaz Rignall (USgamer) noted that the 2015 Lara Croft Go appeared to have been influenced by Monument Valley. Ken Wong left Ustwo Games soon after completing Monument Valley to create his own studio, Mountains, which created Florence. Developers of the 2022 Tunic also cited Monument Valley as an influence.

Monument Valley was reported to have a significant influence on China's indie game development community, as its ability to tell an emotional story through a video game medium influenced numerous developers to build out their own games with similar narratives.

The music video for Ariana Grande's 2018 song "No Tears Left to Cry" was partly inspired by Monument Valley.

== Film adaptation ==
In August 2018, Paramount Animation and Weed Road, in partnership with Ustwo, announced plans to develop a live action/CGI hybrid film based on Monument Valley, with Patrick Osborne slated to direct. It was anticipated that the film would feature live actors exploring the computer generated settings based on the game. Osborne stated "I'm privileged to be handed the reins to Ida's mysterious kingdom, to play in her world of impossible architecture where seeing things differently is everything".
