= D.I.C.E. Award for Mobile Game of the Year =

Annual award presented by the Academy of Interactive Arts & Sciences

- Country: United States
- Presented by: Academy of Interactive Arts & Sciences
- First award: 2002
- Currently held by: Persona 5: The Phantom X
- Website: interactive.org

The D.I.C.E. Award for Mobile Game of the Year is an award presented annually by the Academy of Interactive Arts & Sciences during the D.I.C.E. Awards. The award recognizes a game "for a mobile device platform such as a mobile phone or tablet. These games demonstrate a skilled usage of the device's software and hardware features to offer a unique and addictive play experience. All game genres are eligible. Mobile platforms include, but are not limited to iOS or Android". All active creative/technical, business, and affiliate members of the Academy are qualified to vote for this category.

The most recent winner is Persona 5: The Phantom X, developed by Black Wings Game Studio and published by Sega.

== Handheld & Mobile Game of the Year ==
The Academy introduced, for the 2002 awards ceremony, the award for Hand-Held Game of the Year, which is a category for "game(s) developed for a handheld platform that demonstrates the greatest achievement in overall game design, play and/or breakthrough in handheld gaming". The handheld category was originally presented as a console award. The nomination form for the 2004 awards listed Handheld as a "Wireless & Handheld" category with the inclusion of Wireless Game of the Year. However, there were no finalists named for Wireless in 2004. Finalists would be listed for Wireless Game of the Year, which recognized a "game developed for a wireless phone or handset that demonstrates the greatest achievement in overall game design, play and/or breakthrough in wireless gaming," at the 2005 awards ceremony. However, the only nominees for the award category in 2005 were games for the Nintendo handheld devices. Since there was already a Handheld Game of the Year, Wireless Game of the Year would be replaced with Cellular Game of the Year in 2006. It was changed to Mobile Game of the Year in 2007 but reverted to Cellular Game of the Year in 2008. The 2010 awards ceremony offered Portable Game of the Year, which recognized games that was being "developed for a portable platform" that included either "gaming handhelds or other mobile devices". The Academy then began offering separate awards for Handheld Game of the Year and Mobile Game of the Year again in 2012. The two award categories would eventually be combined into Portable Game of the Year again in 2019 and 2020, and then ultimately be replaced with Mobile Game of the Year from 2021 onwards.

- Handheld Game of the Year (2002–2009, 2012–2018)
- Wireless Game of the Year (2005)
- Cellular Game of the Year (2006, 2008–2009)
- Mobile Game of the Year (2007, 2012–2018, 2021–present)
- Portable Game of the Year (2010–2011, 2019–2020)

== Winners and nominees ==
Table key
Indicates the winner

=== 2000s ===
Year	Game	Developer(s)	Publisher(s)	Ref.
2001 (Note: Presented as Hand-Held Game of the Year.) (5th)	Advance Wars	Intelligent Systems	Nintendo	
2001 (5th)	Golden Sun	Camelot Software Planning	Nintendo	
2001 (5th)	Mario Kart: Super Circuit	Intelligent Systems	Nintendo	
2001 (5th)	The Legend of Zelda: Oracle of Seasons	Flagship/Capcom	Nintendo	
2001 (5th)	Tony Hawk's Pro Skater 2	Vicarious Visions	Activision	
2002 (Note: Presented as Handheld Game of the Year.) (6th)	Metroid Fusion	Nintendo R&D1	Nintendo	
2002 (6th)	Castlevania: Harmony of Dissonance	Konami	Konami	
2002 (6th)	The Legend of Zelda: A Link to the Past and Four Swords	Nintendo R&D2, Flagship/Capcom	Nintendo	
2002 (6th)	Yoshi's Island: Super Mario Advance 3	Nintendo R&D2	Nintendo	
2003 (7th)	Final Fantasy Tactics Advance	Square Enix	Nintendo	
2003 (7th)	Advance Wars 2: Black Hole Rising	Intelligent Systems	Nintendo	
2003 (7th)	Fire Emblem	Intelligent Systems	Nintendo	
2003 (7th)	Mario & Luigi: Superstar Saga	AlphaDream	Nintendo	
2003 (7th)	Pokémon Ruby	Game Freak	Nintendo	
2004 (8th)	Handheld Game of the Year			
2004 (8th)	Metroid: Zero Mission	Nintendo R&D1	Nintendo	
2004 (8th)	Kingdom Hearts: Chain of Memories	Square Enix	Square Enix	
2004 (8th)	Super Mario 64 DS	Nintendo EAD	Nintendo	
2004 (8th)	Wireless Game of the Year (Note: Games for phones eligible for Wireless Game of the Year, but none were nominated.)			
2004 (8th)	Super Mario 64 DS	Nintendo EAD	Nintendo	
2004 (8th)	Pokémon FireRed and LeafGreen	Game Freak	Nintendo	
2005 (9th)	Handheld Game of the Year			
2005 (9th)	Nintendogs	Nintendo EAD	Nintendo	
2005 (9th)	Burnout Legends	Criterion Games	Electronic Arts	
2005 (9th)	Grand Theft Auto: Liberty City Stories	Rockstar Leeds	Rockstar Games	
2005 (9th)	Mario & Luigi: Partners in Time	AlphaDream	Nintendo	
2005 (9th)	The Legend of Zelda: The Minish Cap	Flagship/Capcom	Nintendo	
2005 (9th)	Cellular Game of the Year			
2005 (9th)	Ancient Empires II	Macrospace	Sorrent	
2005 (9th)	High Seize	RedLynx	Nokia	
2005 (9th)	Mile High Pinball	Ideaworks3D	Nokia	
2005 (9th)	One	Digital Legends	Nokia	
2005 (9th)	Skipping Stone	Gamevil	I-Play	
2006 (10th)	Handheld Game of the Year			
2006 (10th)	Brain Age: Train Your Brain in Minutes a Day!	Nintendo SPD	Nintendo	
2006 (10th)	Elite Beat Agents	iNiS	Nintendo	
2006 (10th)	Lego Star Wars II: The Original Trilogy	Traveller's Tales	LucasArts	
2006 (10th)	LocoRoco	Japan Studio	Sony Computer Entertainment	
2006 (10th)	New Super Mario Bros.	Nintendo EAD	Nintendo	
2006 (10th)	Mobile Game of the Year			
2006 (10th)	Orcs & Elves	id Software, Fountainhead Entertainment	EA Mobile	
2006 (10th)	Brothers in Arms 3D	Gameloft	Gameloft	
2006 (10th)	DuckShot	MoFactor	Hands-On Mobile	
2006 (10th)	Tropical Madness	Gameloft	Gameloft	
2007 (11th)	Handheld Game of the Year			
2007 (11th)	The Legend of Zelda: Phantom Hourglass	Nintendo EAD	Nintendo	
2007 (11th)	Drawn to Life	5th Cell	THQ	
2007 (11th)	Jeanne d'Arc	Level-5	Sony Computer Entertainment	
2007 (11th)	Puzzle Quest: Challenge of the Warlords	Infinite Interactive, 1st Playable Productions	D3 Publisher	
2007 (11th)	Ratchet & Clank: Size Matters	High Impact Games	Sony Computer Entertainment	
2007 (11th)	Cellular Game of the Year			
2007 (11th)	skate.	EA Black Box	EA Mobile	
2007 (11th)	Diner Dash 2: Restaurant Rescue	PlayFirst	PlayFirst	
2007 (11th)	Prey Mobile	MachineWorks Northwest	Skyzone	
2007 (11th)	SimCity Societies	Tilted Mill Entertainment	Electronic Arts	
2008 (12th)	Hand-Held Game of the Year			
2008 (12th)	God of War: Chains of Olympus	Ready at Dawn	Sony Computer Entertainment	
2008 (12th)	Advance Wars: Days of Ruin	Intelligent Systems	Nintendo	
2008 (12th)	Castlevania: Order of Ecclesia	Konami	Konami	
2008 (12th)	Patapon	Japan Studio	Sony Computer Entertainment	
2008 (12th)	Professor Layton and the Curious Village	Level-5	Nintendo	
2008 (12th)	Cellular Game of the Year			
2008 (12th)	Spore Origins	Babaroga, Tricky Software	Electronic Arts	
2008 (12th)	Reset Generation	RedLynx	Nokia	
2008 (12th)	Trism	Demiforce	Demiforce	
2009 (Note: Portable Game of the Year was offered to handheld gaming devices and other mobile devices.) (13th)	Scribblenauts	5th Cell	Warner Bros. Interactive Entertainment	
2009 (13th)	LittleBigPlanet	SCE Studio Cambridge	Sony Computer Entertainment	
2009 (13th)	Mario & Luigi: Bowser's Inside Story	AlphaDream	Nintendo	
2009 (13th)	Professor Layton and the Diabolical Box	Level-5	Nintendo	
2009 (13th)	The Legend of Zelda: Spirit Tracks	Nintendo EAD	Nintendo	

=== 2010s ===
Year	Game	Developer(s)	Publisher(s)	Ref.
2010 (14th)	God of War: Ghost of Sparta	Ready at Dawn	Sony Computer Entertainment	
2010 (14th)	Dragon Quest IX: Sentinels of the Starry Skies	Square Enix	Nintendo	
2010 (14th)	Infinity Blade	Chair Entertainment	Epic Games	
2010 (14th)	Professor Layton and the Unwound Future	Level-5	Nintendo	
2010 (14th)	Valkyria Chronicles II	Sega	Sega	
2011 (15th)	Handheld Game of the Year			
2011 (15th)	Super Mario 3D Land	Nintendo EAD	Nintendo	
2011 (15th)	Ghost Trick: Phantom Detective	Capcom	Capcom	
2011 (15th)	Kirby Mass Attack	HAL Laboratory	Nintendo	
2011 (15th)	Mario Kart 7	Nintendo EAD	Nintendo	
2011 (15th)	Professor Layton and the Last Specter	Level-5	Nintendo	
2011 (15th)	Mobile Game of the Year			
2011 (15th)	Infinity Blade II	Chair Entertainment	Epic Games	
2011 (15th)	Contre Jour	Mokus	Chillingo	
2011 (15th)	Dead Space	IronMonkey Studios	Electronic Arts	
2011 (15th)	Tentacles: Enter the Dolphin	Press Play	Microsoft Studios	
2011 (15th)	The Dark Meadow	Phosphor Studios	Phosphor Studios	
2012 (16th)	Handheld Game of the Year			
2012 (16th)	Paper Mario: Sticker Star	Intelligent Systems	Nintendo	
2012 (16th)	Gravity Rush	Japan Studio	Sony Computer Entertainment	
2012 (16th)	Resident Evil: Revelations	Capcom	Capcom	
2012 (16th)	Sound Shapes	Queasy Games	Sony Computer Entertainment	
2012 (16th)	Uncharted: Golden Abyss	Bend Studio	Sony Computer Entertainment	
2012 (16th)	Mobile Game of the Year			
2012 (16th)	Hero Academy	Robot Entertainment	Robot Entertainment	
2012 (16th)	Fairway Solitaire	Big Fish Studios	Big Fish Games	
2012 (16th)	Horn	Phosphor Studios	Zynga	
2012 (16th)	Rayman Jungle Run	Ubisoft Montpellier, Pastagames	Ubisoft	
2013 (17th)	Handheld Game of the Year			
2013 (17th)	The Legend of Zelda: A Link Between Worlds	Nintendo EAD	Nintendo	
2013 (17th)	Fire Emblem Awakening	Intelligent Systems	Nintendo	
2013 (17th)	Luigi's Mansion: Dark Moon	Next Level Games	Nintendo	
2013 (17th)	Pokémon X & Y	Game Freak	Nintendo	
2013 (17th)	Tearaway	Media Molecule	Sony Computer Entertainment	
2013 (17th)	Mobile Game of the Year			
2013 (17th)	Plants vs. Zombies 2	PopCap Games	Electronic Arts	
2013 (17th)	FETCH	Big Fish Studios	Big Fish Games	
2013 (17th)	Flick Kick Football Legends	PikPok	PikPok	
2013 (17th)	Ridiculous Fishing	Vlambeer	Vlambeer	
2013 (17th)	The Wolf Among Us	Telltale Games	Telltale Games	
2014 (18th)	Handheld Game of the Year			
2014 (18th)	Super Smash Bros. for Nintendo 3DS	Bandai Namco Entertainment, Sora Ltd.	Nintendo	
2014 (18th)	Bravely Default	Square Enix	Nintendo	
2014 (18th)	Child of Light	Ubisoft Montreal	Ubisoft	
2014 (18th)	Shovel Knight	Yacht Club Games	Yacht Club Games	
2014 (18th)	Theatrhythm Final Fantasy: Curtain Call	Square Enix, indieszero	Square Enix	
2014 (18th)	Mobile Game of the Year			
2014 (18th)	Hearthstone: Heroes of Warcraft	Blizzard Entertainment	Blizzard Entertainment	
2014 (18th)	80 Days	Inkle	Inkle	
2014 (18th)	Kingdom Rush: Origins	ironhide Game Studio	Armor Games	
2014 (18th)	Monument Valley	ustwo	ustwo	
2014 (18th)	Threes	Sirvo	Sirvo	
2015 (19th)	Handheld Game of the Year			
2015 (19th)	Helldivers	Arrowhead Game Studios	Sony Computer Entertainment	
2015 (19th)	Earth Defense Force 2: Invaders from Planet Space	Sandlot, D3 Publisher	Xseed Games	
2015 (19th)	Pokémon Super Mystery Dungeon	Spike Chunsoft, The Pokémon Company	Nintendo	
2015 (19th)	Yo-kai Watch	Level-5	Nintendo	
2015 (19th)	Mobile Game of the Year			
2015 (19th)	Fallout Shelter	Bethesda Game Studios, Behaviour Interactive	Bethesda Softworks	
2015 (19th)	DomiNations	Big Huge Games	Nexon	
2015 (19th)	Lara Croft Go	Square Enix Montreal	Square Enix Europe	
2015 (19th)	Pac-Man 256	Hipster Whale	Bandai Namco Entertainment	
2015 (19th)	The Room Three	Fireproof Games	Fireproof Games	
2016 (20th)	Handheld Game of the Year			
2016 (20th)	Pokémon Sun and Moon	Game Freak	Nintendo	
2016 (20th)	Dragon Quest Builders	Square Enix	Square Enix	
2016 (20th)	Fire Emblem Fates	Intelligent Systems	Nintendo	
2016 (20th)	Kirby: Planet Robobot	HAL Laboratory	Nintendo	
2016 (20th)	Severed	DrinkBox Studios	DrinkBox Studios	
2016 (20th)	Mobile Game of the Year			
2016 (20th)	Pokémon Go	Niantic	Niantic	
2016 (20th)	Clash Royale	Supercell	Supercell	
2016 (20th)	Crashlands	Butterscotch Shenanigans	Butterscotch Shenanigans	
2016 (20th)	Gardenscapes: New Acres	Playrix	Playrix	
2016 (20th)	Reigns	Nerial	Devolver Digital	
2017 (21st)	Handheld Game of the Year			
2017 (21st)	Metroid: Samus Returns	MercurySteam	Nintendo	
2017 (21st)	Dragon Quest VIII: Journey of the Cursed King	Level-5, Square Enix	Nintendo	
2017 (21st)	Etrian Odyssey V: Beyond the Myth	Atlus	Atlus	
2017 (21st)	Fire Emblem Echoes: Shadows of Valentia	Intelligent Systems	Nintendo	
2017 (21st)	Monster Hunter Stories	Capcom, Marvelous Inc.	Nintendo	
2017 (21st)	Mobile Game of the Year			
2017 (21st)	Fire Emblem Heroes	Intelligent Systems	Nintendo	
2017 (21st)	Cat Quest	The Gentlebros	PQube	
2017 (21st)	Gorogoa	Jason Roberts, Buried Signal	Annapurna Interactive	
2017 (21st)	Monument Valley 2	ustwo	ustwo	
2017 (21st)	Splitter Critters	RAC7 Games	RAC7 Games	
2018 (22nd)	Florence	Mountains	Annapurna Interactive	
2018 (22nd)	Dandara	Long Hat House	Raw Fury	
2018 (22nd)	Donut County	Ben Esposito	Annapurna Interactive	
2018 (22nd)	Dragalia Lost	Cygames	Nintendo	
2018 (22nd)	Oddmar	Mobge	Mobge	
2019 (23rd)	Sayonara Wild Hearts	Simogo	Annapurna Interactive	
2019 (23rd)	Call of Duty: Mobile	TiMi Studio Group	Activision	
2019 (23rd)	Grindstone	Capybara Games	Capybara Games	
2019 (23rd)	Sky: Children of the Light	Thatgamecompany	Thatgamecompany	
2019 (23rd)	What the Golf?	Triband	The Label, Triband	

=== 2020s ===
Year	Game	Developer(s)	Publisher(s)	Ref.
2020 (24th)	Legends of Runeterra	Riot Games	Riot Games	
2020 (24th)	HoloVista	Aconite	Aconite	
2020 (24th)	Little Orpheus	The Chinese Room	Sumo Digital	
2020 (24th)	Song of Bloom	Kamibox	Kamibox	
2020 (24th)	South of the Circle	State of Play Games	Apple, Inc.	
2021 (25th)	Pokémon Unite	TiMi Studio Group	The Pokémon Company	
2021 (25th)	Behind the Frame	Silver Lining Studio	Akupara Games, Akatsuki Taiwan	
2021 (25th)	Fantasian	Mistwalker	Apple, Inc.	
2021 (25th)	League of Legends: Wild Rift	Riot Games	Riot Games	
2021 (25th)	Moncage	Optillusion	X.D. Network	
2022 (26th)	Marvel Snap	Second Dinner	Nuverse	
2022 (26th)	Diablo Immortal	Blizzard Entertainment	Blizzard Entertainment	
2022 (26th)	Gibbon: Beyond the Trees	Broken Rules	Broken Rules	
2022 (26th)	Immortality	Half Mermaid Studios	Half Mermaid Studios	
2022 (26th)	Poinpy	Moppin	Devolver Digital, Netflix Games	
2023 (27th)	What the Car?	Triband	Triband	
2023 (27th)	Gubbins	Studio Folly	Studio Folly	
2023 (27th)	Hello Kitty Island Adventure	Sunblink	Sunblink	
2023 (27th)	Honkai: Star Rail	miHoYo	HoYoverse	
2023 (27th)	Terra Nil	Free Lives	Devolver Digital	
2024 (28th)	Balatro	LocalThunk	PlayStack	
2024 (28th)	Halls of Torment	Chasing Carrots	Chasing Carrots	
2024 (28th)	Monument Valley 3	ustwo	Netflix Games	
2024 (28th)	Paper Trail	Newfangled Games	Newfangled Games	
2024 (28th)	Wuthering Waves	Kuro Games	Kuro Games	
2025 (29th)	Persona 5: The Phantom X	Black Wings Game Studio	Sega	
2025 (29th)	Umamusume: Pretty Derby	Cygames	Cygames	
2025 (29th)	What the Clash?	Triband	Triband	
2025 (29th)	Where Winds Meet	Everstone Studio	NetEase Games	

== Multiple nominations and wins ==
=== Developers and publishers ===
Nintendo has published the most nominees and wins, and has also developed the most nominees and wins. The majority of Nintendo-published titles are made for their handheld devices, except for Fire Emblem Heroes and Dragalia Lost. Nintendo has published handheld winners for seven consecutive years from 2002 to 2008. Nintendo is also the only publisher with wins in both the handheld and mobile categories, including wins in both categories during the same year in 2018. In addition, Nintendo has also published winners for Handheld and Wireless in 2005. Nintendo has published every handheld finalist in 2004. Annapurna Interactive has published back-to-back winners for Portable in 2019 and 2020. Level-5 has developed the most nominees without a win, while Nokia and Square Enix have published the most nominees without a win.

Developers
Developer	Nominations	Wins
Nintendo EAD/R&D1/R&D2/SPD	14	8
Intelligent Systems	10	3
Ready at Dawn	2	2
Square Enix (Note: includes Square Enix Montreal.)	8	1
Game Freak	4	1
Triband	3	1
Blizzard Entertainment	2	1
Chair Entertainment	2	1
5th Cell	2	1
Riot Games	2	1
TiMi Studio Group	2	1
Level-5	7	0
Capcom	6	0
AlphaDream	3	0
Flagship	3	0
Japan Studio	3	0
ustwo	3	0
Big Fish Studios	2	0
Cygames	2	0
Gameloft	2	0
HAL Laboratory	2	0
Konami	2	0
Phosphor Studios	2	0
RedLynx	2	0

Publishers
Publisher	Nominations	Wins
Nintendo	52	15
Electronic Arts	7	4
Sony Computer Entertainment	12	3
Annapurna Interactive	4	2
Triband	3	1
Blizzard Entertainment	2	1
Epic Games	2	1
Riot Games	2	1
Sega	2	1
Nokia	4	0
Square Enix (Note: includes Square Enix Europe.)	4	0
Devolver Digital	3	0
Activision	2	0
Apple, Inc.	2	0
Big Fish Games	2	0
Capcom	2	0
Gameloft	2	0
Konami	2	0
Netflix Games	2	0
Ubisoft	2	0
ustwo	2	0

=== Franchises ===
The Mario franchise has the most nominations, and ties with Pokémon and Metroid for the most wins. God of War and Metroid have won every single time they have been nominated. The majority of repeat nominees are from handheld gaming devices; the only multiple nominees that have been produced exclusively for mobile devices are Infinity Blade, Monument Valley, and What the?. Pokémon and Fire Emblem are the only franchises with nominations in both Handheld and Mobile categories. Pokémon is the only franchise with wins on both the handheld gaming device and mobile device, as well as winning both Handheld and Mobile categories within the same year in 2017. Super Mario 64 DS is a finalist for both Handheld and Wireless in 2005, winning for the latter. Professor Layton is the most nominated franchise without a win.

Franchises
Franchise	Nominations	Wins
Mario (Note: includes Luigi's Mansion: Dark Moon.)	12	3
Pokémon	7	3
Metroid	3	3
The Legend of Zelda	6	2
God of War	2	2
Fire Emblem	5	1
Advance Wars	3	1
What the?	3	1
Final Fantasy	2	1
Infinity Blade	2	1
League of Legends (Note: Legends of Runeterra is a spin-off of League of Legends.)	2	1
Professor Layton	4	0
Dragon Quest	3	0
Monument Valley	3	0
Castlevania	2	0
Kirby	2	0
