= Mega Mall Story =

2014 video game

- Developer: Kairosoft
- Publisher: Byril
- Platforms: iOS; Android; Windows; Nintendo Switch
- Release: iOS; August 9, 2011; Android; July 10, 2013; Microsoft Windows; April 5, 2014; Nintendo Switch; January 17, 2019
- Genre: Simulation game
- Mode: Single-player

Mega Mall Story is a simulation game developed by Kairosoft Co. Ltd and released on August 9, 2011, for iOS. It released on the Nintendo Switch on January 17, 2019.

== Gameplay ==
Having similar gameplay to Tiny Tower, the game allows players to construct their own mall and gain popularity by managing the resources correctly.

== Reception ==
Reception

Aggregate score
Aggregator	Score
Metacritic	85/100

Review scores
Publication	Score
Eurogamer	8/10
IGN	9.0/10
TouchArcade	4.5/5

The game has a Metacritic score of 85/100 based on 12 critic reviews.

Slide To Play said "Mega Mall Story is a brilliant tycoon game that is more fun (and economical) than spending a day at the mall." AppSafari said "Mega Mall Story's subject and style seem particularly suited to younger female casual gamers; after all, malls are considered the domain of teenage girls. But the game never feels like it's deliberately aiming for a female audience, which is to its credit. If a charming, happy, absorbing game about a mall appeals to you, Mega Mall Story is worth your time." TouchArcade said "All of its pieces fit snug and everything you do contributes to a whole package. It's also one of its most wide-reaching games, combining social and sim aspects from all over the place." 148Apps said "Any Kairosoft App Store release should be an insta-buy for sim fans at this point, and Mega Mall Story is certainly no exception. It's well worth the meager asking price, but buyer beware: it can have a profound effect on productivity. And one's social life."

IGN wrote "Mega Mall Story represents Kairosoft's most addictive game experience yet. It strikes the perfect balance between accessibility and simulation depth." Multiplayer.it said "Mega Mall Story shares some issues with the previous made-in-Kairosoft games, like touch controls far from perfect and its lack of replayability. Anyway there is no doubt that this one is the best and deepest sim the Japanese studio has developed until now." Eurogamer wrote "With its familiar interface, simple mechanics and hummable ditty, resistance to its effortless charm is completely futile. At this stage, you might as well". Gamezebo said "On the gameplay side I think they trimmed out a lot of the under the hood yin and yang nonsense."

AppSpy said "Despite its faults, Mega Mall Story is an excellent sim game that will have fans of the genre glued to their iPhones for hours." Pocket Gamer said "Kairosoft continues its management game dominance with Mega Mall Story: our addiction levels beg for mercy." TouchGen wrote "A fun simulation game with cool graphics, and a enjoyable vibe. Being on the easy and short side, and lacking online leaderboards hurt it quite a lot. Still it is worth getting if you have enjoyed the other titles from Kairosoft."
