= Monument Valley 2 =

2017 video game sequel to Monument Valley

- Developer: Ustwo Games
- Publisher: Ustwo Games
- Engine: Unity
- Platforms: iOS; Android; Windows; Nintendo Switch; PlayStation 4; PlayStation 5; Xbox One; Xbox Series X/S
- Release: iOS: WW: June 5, 2017; Android: WW: November 6, 2017; Windows: WW: July 12, 2022; Consoles: WW: April 15, 2025
- Genre: Puzzle
- Mode: Single-player

Monument Valley 2 (stylized as Monument Valley II) is an indie puzzle game developed and published by Ustwo Games. It is the sequel to the 2014 game Monument Valley. It was released for iOS in June 2017, and released for Android in November 2017. A new chapter called The Lost Forest was freely added in October 2021. Monument Valley 2+, an Apple Arcade exclusive, was released on March 11, 2022. The PC version of the game, Monument Valley 2: Panoramic Edition, was released for Microsoft Windows in July 2022 and the game was later also released for Nintendo Switch, PlayStation 4, PlayStation 5, Xbox One and Xbox Series X and Series S in April 2025, while the mobile version was praised by critics and considered among the best mobile games of all time. A sequel, Monument Valley 3, was released in December 2024.

== Gameplay ==
Monument Valley 2 is presented in an isometric view, similarly to the first game of the series. The goal is to guide Ro and her child through mazes that include elements of optical illusions and impossible objects. The player can tap on the screen to move either Ro or her child (depending on the chapter) or to trigger changes in the architecture of the level to complete the puzzle. At the start of the game, Ro's child follows Ro, and the player cannot control her independently. However, at some point in the game they split – Ro and Ro's child play the levels individually, with Ro's child growing to an adult – until, in the final levels, they rejoin and are controlled separately.

== Development ==
Monument Valley was a critically successful game, achieving more than 30 million downloads by June 2017, which led to growth within Ustwo Games. While their next title, Land's End switched to virtual reality, and the lead developer of Monument Valley, Ken Wong, had left to form his own studio, many of the new talent hired into Ustwo were eager to work on a new Monument Valley title, leading to the studio to start on Monument Valley 2's development.

The sequel became more story-driven than the first, featuring a mother and her daughter. This partially was in response to player feedback from the first game. Ustwo studio head Dan Gray said that they found people found affinity for story elements that they had not purposely placed at the forefront, leading them to shift direction in the sequel. The change was also inspired by the fact many of the developers from the first game had become parents in the intervening years, and the characters resonated with them more. This subsequently inspired some of the art-shifts in the game away from the M.C. Escher-styled roots as to reflect moods associated with the puzzles, such as one stage where the mother and daughter are separated, presented in a grey, Brutalist structure to reflect the emotional toil of the separation. Further, the development team recognized that playable mother-and-daughter characters are not a frequent aspect of video games; Gray said that most games introduce the mother character to simply provide knowledge, whereas they wanted the mother to be "very influential and powerful" within the sequel. Level designs also came from various imagery that the team's artists had carried with them, and ranged from a number of sources, including abstract and modern art, locations they had visited, and even modern popular icons such as Kim Chi and Nicki Minaj.

Monument Valley 2 for iOS was first revealed at the 2017 Apple Worldwide Developers Conference on June 5, 2017, and was made available that same day.

A version for Android was released on November 6, 2017. In addition, Ustwo worked with Tencent to prepare special version of Monument Valley 2 in China with optional localized storyline and social features. The game was released for Windows on July 12, 2022, and for Nintendo Switch, PlayStation 4, PlayStation 5, Xbox One and Xbox Series X and Series S on April 15, 2025.

A new chapter to Monument Valley 2 called The Lost Forest was freely added in October 2021. The chapter was developed as part of the UN Playing for the Planet's Green Game Jam intended to help promote forest conservation. The DLC is also included in the rereleases.

== Reception ==
Reception

Aggregate score
| Aggregator | Score |
|---|---|
| Metacritic | 83/100 |

Review scores
| Publication | Score |
|---|---|
| Destructoid | 8/10 |
| Pocket Gamer | 5/5 |
| Polygon | 8/10 |
| TouchArcade | 4.5/5 |

Monument Valley 2 received mostly positive reviews. On Metacritic, which assigns a score based on the average scores of other critics, the game received a score of 83 out of 100, indicating "generally favorable reviews". Polygon gave the game a score of 8 out of 10, calling it an "accomplished, charming game, though it stops just short of greatness" and saying it "successfully replicates the original's charm and vibrancy". Destructoid gave the game a score of 8 out of 10, praising the game for its improvements from its predecessor, noting "the puzzle design is two-steps above from the previous title." Gamezebo gave the game a score of 4.5 stars out of 5 praising the game's "phenomenally expressive storytelling with visuals and audio meshing seamlessly", the game's "new mechanics and old ones freshened up with dual protagonists" and that the game invites the player to explore and pays it off". However, like the game's predecessor, the main criticism Monument Valley 2 faced was the game's short length.

Within a year, the game sold nearly 3.5 million copies, with total revenues over US$10.4 million. Due primarily to its "free to start" release in China, the game had been downloaded more than 30 million times. Total downloads of both Monument Valley and its sequel were over 80 million as of September 2019.

The game was nominated for "Best Mobile Game" in Destructoid's Game of the Year Awards 2017. It won the award for the same category in IGN's Best of 2017 Awards, whereas its other nominations were for "Best Puzzle Game" and "Best Art Direction". The game came in second place for "Best Puzzle Game" in Game Informer's Reader's Choice Best of 2017 Awards. The Verge named it as one of their 15 Best Games of 2017.

=== Accolades ===
| Year | Awards | Category | Result | Ref. |
|---|---|---|---|---|
| 2017 | Golden Joystick Awards | Handheld/Mobile Game of the Year | Nominated | |
| 2017 | Golden Joystick Awards | Ultimate Game of the Year | Nominated | |
| 2017 | The Game Awards 2017 | Best Mobile Game | Won | |
| 2017 | British Academy Children's Awards 2017 | Game | Nominated | |
| 2018 | 21st Annual D.I.C.E. Awards | Mobile Game of the Year | Nominated | |
| 2018 | National Academy of Video Game Trade Reviewers Awards | Art Direction, Contemporary | Nominated | |
| 2018 | National Academy of Video Game Trade Reviewers Awards | Game, Puzzle | Nominated | |
| 2018 | Italian Video Game Awards | Best Mobile Game | Won | |
| 2018 | SXSW Gaming Awards | Mobile Game of the Year | Nominated | |
| 2018 | Game Developers Choice Awards | Best Mobile Game | Nominated | |
| 2018 | 16th Annual Game Audio Network Guild Awards | Best Game Audio Article, Publication or Broadcast | Nominated | |
| 2018 | 16th Annual Game Audio Network Guild Awards | Best Sound Design for an Indie Game | Nominated | |
| 2018 | 14th British Academy Games Awards | British Game | Nominated | |
| 2018 | 14th British Academy Games Awards | Family | Nominated | |
| 2018 | 14th British Academy Games Awards | Mobile Game | Nominated | |
| 2018 | 2018 Webby Awards | Best Art Direction | Nominated | |
| 2018 | 2018 Webby Awards | Best Game Design | Nominated | |
| 2018 | 2018 Webby Awards | Best User Experience | Nominated | |
| 2018 | 2018 Webby Awards | Best Visual Design | Nominated | |
| 2018 | 2018 Webby Awards | Puzzle | Won | |
| 2018 | Develop Awards | Visual Design | Nominated | |
| 2018 | Develop Awards | Music Design | Nominated | |
| 2018 | Develop Awards | Sound Design (ustwo Games) | Nominated | |
| 2018 | The Independent Game Developers' Association Awards | Best Audio Design | Nominated | |
| 2018 | The Independent Game Developers' Association Awards | Best Puzzle Game | Nominated | |
| 2018 | The Independent Game Developers' Association Awards | Visual Design | Nominated | |
