= Lists of black people =

Lists of black people include:

== Achievements ==
- List of black Academy Award winners and nominees
- List of black Golden Globe Award winners and nominees
- List of first black Major League Baseball players
- List of black Nobel Laureates

== Fictional characters ==
- List of black animated characters
- List of black superheroes
- List of black video game characters

== Nationality ==
- Lists of African Americans
- List of Afro-Arabs
- List of Afro-Latinos
- List of Akan
- List of Brazilians of Black African descent
- List of black Britons
- List of black Canadians
- List of Black Hebrew Israelites
- List of Igbo
- Lists of Indigenous Australians
- List of Sierra Leone Creole people
- List of Xhosa
- List of Yoruba
- List of Zulu

== Occupation ==
- List of African-American astronauts
- List of black British writers
- List of Black British artists
- List of black fashion models
- List of black photographers
- List of composers of African descent
- List of Indigenous Australian sportspeople
- List of National Hockey League players of black African descent

== Religion ==
- List of Jewish African-Americans
- Category:African-American Christians
