= Cafeteria Nipponica =

2012 video game

- Developer: Kairosoft
- Designers: Neville Brody; Noma Bar; Oscar Mariné; Otl Aicher; Paul Rand; Paula Scher; Peter Buchanan-Smith
- Platforms: Android, iOS Nintendo Switch, PlayStation 4
- Release: Android, iOS: NA: April, 2012; PS4: WW: October 1, 2020
- Genre: Simulation
- Mode: Single player

Cafeteria Nipponica is a simulation video game developed and published by Kairosoft for the Android and iOS operating systems. It was released in April 2012 and in 2017 it was released on Nintendo Switch. The game places the player in control of a restaurant, which they must build up to a high quality restaurant chain. The game met with mixed reviews, with many reviewers noting that there were better Kairosoft simulation games.

== Gameplay ==
The player takes control of a restaurant, which they must build up to a high quality restaurant chain. Players must simultaneously deal with a number of issues at the same time, such as managing staff and researching new food items. In order to operate the restaurant, the player must have cash on hand; each April in-game, the player's staff's salary is charged, and the player must adapt with less money. You don't have to pay salaries on the first month

== Reception ==
Reception

Aggregate score
Aggregator	Score
Metacritic	64/100

Review score
Publication	Score
TouchArcade	4/5

Cafeteria Nipponica met with mixed reviews from critics, who felt that the downtime found in the game was detrimental towards its enjoyment. Eurogamer's Chris Schilling felt that the game was a success, despite being heavily similar to other Kairosoft titles. Schilling noted that it did enough to "feel fresh". Pocket Gamer's Damien McFarren criticized the game for long waiting periods where the player has to wait for money to come back in from sales after paying employees. He believed that it was not Kairosoft's finest hour, but still called it "not a bad game either". Gamezebo's Mike Rose felt that the five- to ten-minute waits for the game to become actionable again as the player waited for money to come into their accounts was, "a very poor system".
