= Florence (video game) =

2018 interactive story and video game

- Preview title image for Florence
- Developer: Mountains
- Publisher: Annapurna Interactive
- Director: Ken Wong
- Composer: Kevin Penkin
- Engine: Unity
- Platforms: iOS; Android; macOS; Nintendo Switch; Windows
- Release: iOS; February 14, 2018; Android; March 14, 2018; macOS, Switch, Windows; February 13, 2020
- Genre: Minigame
- Mode: Single-player

Florence is a story-driven minigame compilation video game developed by the Australian studio Mountains and published by Annapurna Interactive. The game was released in 2018 for iOS and Android, and in 2020 for macOS, Nintendo Switch, and Windows.

In Florence, the player follows the story of 25-year-old Florence Yeoh as she lives her daily routine and meets Krish, a cellist she sees in the park. The game features little written dialogue and tells Florence's story through a series of brief chapters. Puzzles are used to reinforce pieces of Florence's life as players progress through her story.

Lead designer Ken Wong wanted to create games that eschewed violence and was inspired by his work on Monument Valley to have a more narrative-focused experience that included puzzles. The game received critical acclaim that praised the game's art-style, music, and narrative structure, but received some criticism for its ending.

== Gameplay ==
Florence shows the awkwardness of a first date through a puzzle minigame. As Florence becomes more comfortable talking with Krish, the puzzles become easier.

Florence is divided into 20 chapters, each featuring a different portion of Florence Yeoh's life. The chapters are separated into six acts, which represent different portions of Florence's growth and change. The game plays out linearly, requiring input from the player in the form of short minigames which help mimic or reveal Florence's thoughts and actions. These games include: Florence brushing her teeth, Florence following the sound of a cello to find Krish, Krish cleaning his room before Florence visits, and Florence packing up her things when Krish moves in—and giving Krish's things back to him when he moves out—among others. A single play-through of Florence takes approximately 30 minutes.

== Plot ==
The game follows Florence Yeoh, a 25-year-old woman who lives alone and is settled into a monotonous routine of working at her job and mindlessly interacting with social media on her commute. One morning, her phone dies and she follows the sound of a cello and sees Krish, a street performer, for the first time. Krish befriends her and they go out on some dates. They kiss for the first time and begin to take their relationship more seriously. Krish moves in with Florence and is pushed by her to follow his dreams of being a great cellist. As a thank you, Krish gives Florence a painting set and Florence fantasizes about following her passion of being an artist.

The couple have their first fight six months later at a grocery store. After a year, the two have fallen into a routine and begin to drift apart. After another fight, Krish moves out. Florence decides to quit her job and follow her painting passion, where she finds success.

== Development and release ==
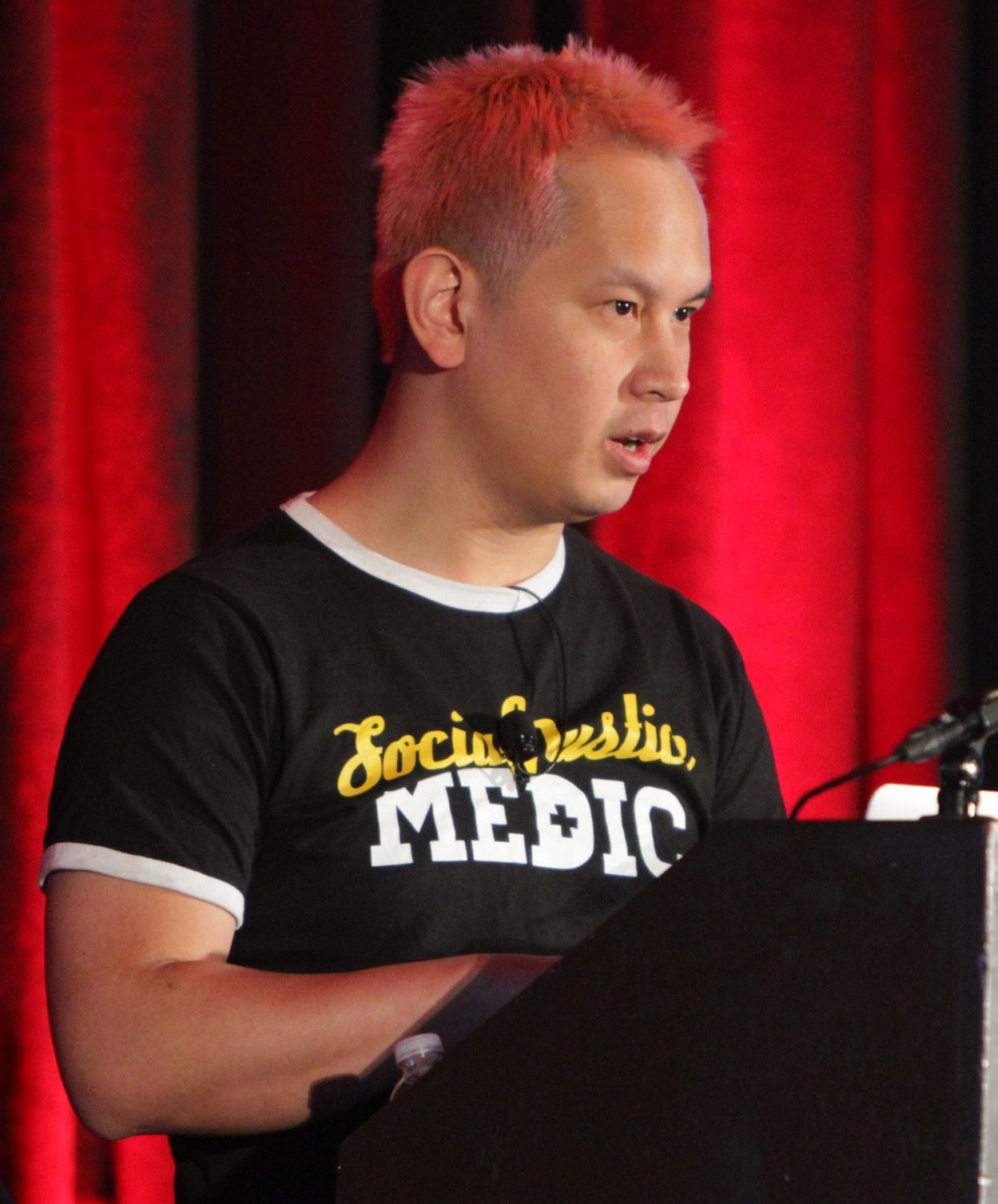
Ken Wong, the lead designer for Florence, wanted to create a game that eschewed violence.

After his success with Monument Valley, game designer Ken Wong felt that he had done what he could at his development studio, Ustwo, and wanted to create his own studio. He chose to move back to his native Australia after seeing the game development scene in Melbourne grow. Wong founded a new company, Mountains, in Melbourne.

After hiring staff, Mountains had no direction on what kind of game they wanted to create. Wong's approach was to first hire the team and then come up with a solid game. The staff discussed how film and books regularly explored love and human emotions, but that it was missing from game design and it would be a "good challenge." They opted to move forward and create Florence. It was the first game Wong had worked on since Monument Valley.

Wong and the rest of the team wanted to create a game that eschewed violence. Wong said, "I wanted to explore what kind of stories and what kind of dynamics we can get without resorting to violence." Mountains decided to make the game on mobile so it could be as accessible as possible. The team's goal was to create a game where players focus on exploring emotions instead of achieving goals. In contrast to Wong's previous game, Monument Valley, Wong wanted to create an experience that was similar to a comic book or silent movie with a focus on narrative. Wong and the team were inspired by film in creating Florence, and specifically cited 500 Days of Summer, Eternal Sunshine of the Spotless Mind, and Titanic.

The developers wanted to make the game a linear experience early on in the process because of a concern that people with more life experience would make the "correct" choices and avoid the moral of the game. Mountains was inspired by the way people consume other media for the emotional connections they bring, and wanted to bring that feeling to video games. The team decided to use music as a substitute for dialogue throughout the game, with the cello representing Krish while the piano follows Florence. Mountains used musical themes for the characters after accidentally creating them during development of the "Groceries" chapter, where Krish and Florence have their first fight. Wong chose the name Florence as she was designed to be a Chinese Australian whose parents picked an "old fashioned name" for their daughter when they immigrated.

Florence was released for iOS on February 14, 2018, coinciding with Valentine's Day, followed by Android on March 14, 2018, and macOS, Nintendo Switch, and Windows on February 13, 2020.

=== Staff abuse allegations ===
After Florence's release, lead developer Ken Wong was accused of being verbally abusive by one of Mountains's staffers during the development of Florence. The staffer, who served as a lead developer on Florence, accused Wong of abusing him emotionally "to the point of depression and suicide." Another staff member described Wong during this period as "a very cruel person in a position of power who liked to make people feel bad to make himself feel better." Wong publicly apologized for his behavior in a statement, saying, "There are a lot of things I should have done better or differently during that time." The abuse by Wong and its impact on Mountains along with abuse by auteur developers at two other development studios that had publishing contracts with Annapurna Interactive were featured in a March 2022 People Make Games video. A policy was implemented after Florence's development that allowed staff to decline one-on-one meetings with Wong if they thought he was overstepping and to use a safeword that would immediately end any conversation with him.

== Reception ==
Reception

Aggregate score
Aggregator	Score
Metacritic	iOS: 82/100; NS: 90/100

Review scores
Publication	Score
Destructoid	8/10
Edge	8/10
Game Informer	8/10
GamesTM	9/10
Pocket Gamer	4/5
The Guardian	4/5
TouchArcade	4.5/5
IGN Japan	9.6/10

=== Critical reception ===
Florence was announced on October 24, 2017. A demo shown publicly at PAX Australia 2017 focused on the first 15 minutes of the game, where it received positive marks from Australian video game journalists. Kotaku Australia's Rae Johnston called Florence her "stand-out game" and felt that the game's minigames succeeded in making her invested in the characters. PC Authority's Alayna Cole praised the game for standing out with a story about love and diversity, describing it as feeling "like a rarity" in modern video game culture.

Florence was well received by critics. CJ Andriessen of Destructoid described the game as "a truly beautiful product" and felt that the game was one of the most imaginative storytelling devices he had ever seen. Tim Biggs of The Sydney Morning Herald felt that the minigames made Florence "truly special" and that it was "breathtaking and emotionally affirming". Jordan Erica Webber of The Guardian praised Florence's ability to capture "what it's like to fall in love for the first time." Eurogamer's Christian Donlan noted that the game's puzzle format to life doesn't "quite work" but still loved the journey the game provided. The Hollywood Reporter's Patrick Shanley praised Wong and his team for nailing the "getting to know you" aspect of dating. IGN Japan's Esra Krabbe called it a "universal work of art" and praised it as a game that anyone could play. The Guardian's Simon Parkin listed Florence as his "Game of the Month" and noted that the game never felt trite and was well executed.

Many reviewers compared the game to the WarioWare series. The Verge's Andrew Webster compared the game to a "webcomic crossed with Warioware," and Polygon's Allegra Frank praised the game's minigames as making the emotional component of the game resonate with the player. Destructoid's Andriessen echoed Frank on the effectiveness of the minigames and felt that the game was a "beautiful product".

Criticism focused on some story elements, specifically its ending. Destructoid's Andriessen stated that the game left him with a "pessimistic opinion" about love and noted that "it's the narcissistic pursuit of their real passion, art, that wins out in the end." Eurogamer's Donlan felt that the ending traded "one easy cliché for another", although concluding that the ending's disappointment may have been the point.

=== Sales ===
Florence made its development costs back, but did not make enough money to fund Mountains' next project. Ken Wong, Florence's lead designer, described the game's sales as "okay" and stated that "Premium mobile is tough." At a panel discussion, Wong mentioned that half of the sales for Florence were from China, and noted that more people had played the game in Mandarin than in English. Wong reported at Game Developers Conference 2019 that 88% of sales were on iOS, with 41% of those iOS sales coming from China.

=== Accolades ===
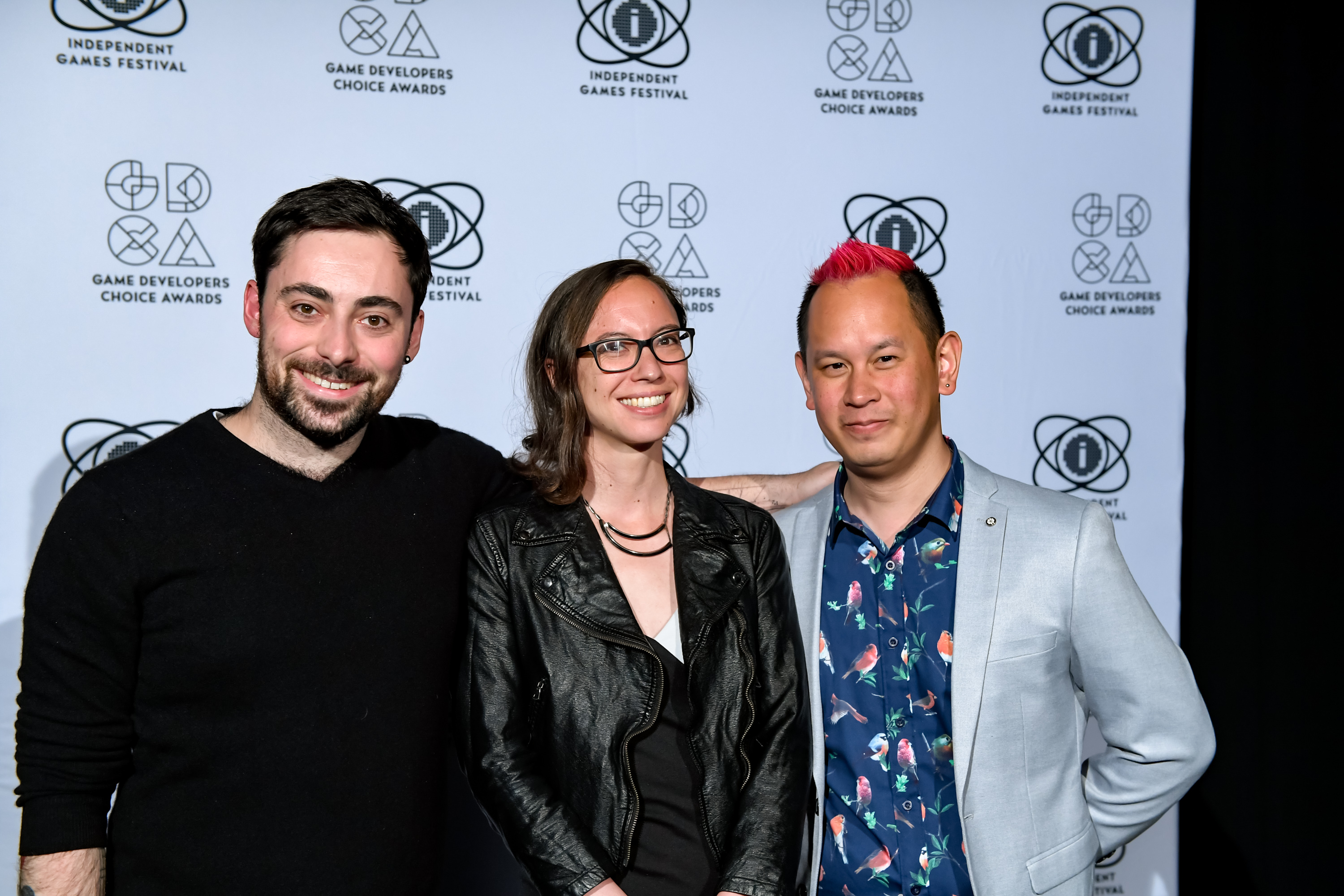
From left to right: Florence composer Kevin Penkin, producer Kamina Vincent and creative director Ken Wong at the 2019 Game Developers Choice Awards

The game was a runner-up for "Best Moment or Sequence" with "Trying to Piece the Relationship Back Together" in Giant Bomb's Game of the Year Awards 2018. Polygon named the game among the decade's best. It was also awarded an Apple Design Award in 2018.

Year	Award	Category	Result	Ref
2018	Golden Joystick Awards	Mobile Game of the Year	Nominated	
2018	The Game Awards 2018	Games for Impact	Nominated	
2018	The Game Awards 2018	Best Mobile Game	Won	
2018	The Game Awards 2018	Best Debut Indie Game	Nominated	
2018	Gamers' Choice Awards	Fan Favorite Mobile Game	Nominated	
2018	Australian Games Awards	Australian Developed Game of the Year	Nominated	
2019	New York Game Awards	A-Train Award for Best Mobile Game	Won	
2019	22nd Annual D.I.C.E. Awards	Portable Game of the Year	Won	
2019	22nd Annual D.I.C.E. Awards	Outstanding Achievement for an Independent Game	Nominated	
2019	22nd Annual D.I.C.E. Awards	Outstanding Achievement in Game Direction	Nominated	
2019	22nd Annual D.I.C.E. Awards	Outstanding Achievement in Story	Nominated	
2019	National Academy of Video Game Trade Reviewers Awards	Game, Original Adventure	Nominated	
2019	National Academy of Video Game Trade Reviewers Awards	Game, Special Class	Nominated	
2019	SXSW Gaming Awards	Excellence in Narrative	Nominated	
2019	SXSW Gaming Awards	Mobile Game of the Year	Nominated	
2019	Game Developers Choice Awards	Best Debut (Mountains)	Won	
2019	Game Developers Choice Awards	Best Mobile Game	Won	
2019	Game Developers Choice Awards	Innovation Award	Nominated	
2019	Game Developers Choice Awards	Best Narrative	Nominated	
2019	15th British Academy Games Awards	Debut Game	Nominated	
2019	15th British Academy Games Awards	Game Beyond Entertainment	Nominated	
2019	15th British Academy Games Awards	Mobile Game	Won	
2019	15th British Academy Games Awards	Narrative	Nominated	
2019	15th British Academy Games Awards	Music	Nominated	
2019	15th British Academy Games Awards	Original Property	Nominated	
2019	International Mobile Gaming Awards	Grand Prix	Won	
2019	Italian Video Game Awards	Best Mobile Game	Won	
2019	Italian Video Game Awards	Game Beyond Entertainment	Nominated	
2019	2019 Webby Awards	Best Art Direction	Nominated	
2019	2019 Webby Awards	Best Game Design	Won	
2019	2019 Webby Awards	Best Music/Sound Design	Nominated	
2019	2019 Webby Awards	Best Writing	Nominated	
2019	Games for Change Awards	Best Gameplay	Nominated	
