= Monument Valley 3 =

2024 puzzle video game

- Developer: Ustwo Games
- Publishers: Netflix Games (iOS, Android, 2024 version); Ustwo Games (PC, consoles, iOS, Android, 2025 version)
- Director: Jennifer Estaris
- Series: Monument Valley
- Platforms: iOS; Android; Nintendo Switch; PlayStation 4; PlayStation 5; Windows; Xbox One; Xbox Series X/S
- Release: iOS, Android; 10 December 2024 - 14 July 2025, 3 December 2025 - present; PC, Consoles; 22 July 2025
- Genre: Puzzle
- Mode: Single-player

Monument Valley 3 (stylized as Monument Valley III) is a 2024 indie puzzle video game developed by Ustwo Games. It is the sequel to the 2017 game Monument Valley 2. It was originally published by Netflix Games for iOS and Android via Netflix on 10 December 2024, before being removed from the platform in July 2025 and released by Ustwo for Nintendo Switch, Windows, PlayStation 4, PlayStation 5 and Xbox Series X and Series S later that month and for iOS and Android the following December. A free expansion, titled The Garden of Life, was released in December 2025.

== Release ==
At Gamescom 2024, it was announced that Monument Valley 3 would launch exclusively on Netflix Games on 10 December 2024. It was also announced that the first two games were to be moved to Netflix Games. The game's producers cited lack of visibility as the primary reason for the move away from Apple's App Store. An animated short film, titled "The Lighthouse", was created by Moth Studio Production to promote the game and was released the same day.

Monument Valley 3 was released by Ustwo Games on Nintendo Switch, Windows, PlayStation 4, PlayStation 5 and Xbox Series X and Series S on 22 July 2025 and Netflix removed the game from their platform on 14 July 2025. It was re-released by Ustwo to iOS and Android as a try-before-you-buy app on 3 December 2025. A free expansion, titled The Garden of Life and adding four new chapters, was also released the same day for all versions.

== Reception ==
Reception

Aggregate score
Aggregator	Score
Metacritic	74/100

Review scores
Publication	Score
Eurogamer	3/5
Shacknews	8/10

On the review aggregator site Metacritic, Monument Valley 3 received a weighted average score of 74 out of 100 based on nine critics' scores, indicating "mixed or average" reviews.

=== Awards ===
Year	Award	Category	Result	Ref.
2025	28th Annual D.I.C.E. Awards	Mobile Game of the Year	Nominated	
2025	28th Annual D.I.C.E. Awards	Outstanding Achievement in Original Music Composition	Nominated	
2025	28th Annual D.I.C.E. Awards	Outstanding Achievement in Audio Design	Nominated	
2026	22nd British Academy Games Awards	British Game	Nominated	
2026	22nd British Academy Games Awards	Family	Longlisted	
2026	22nd British Academy Games Awards	Game Beyond Entertainment	Longlisted	
