= Land's End (video game) =

2015 video game

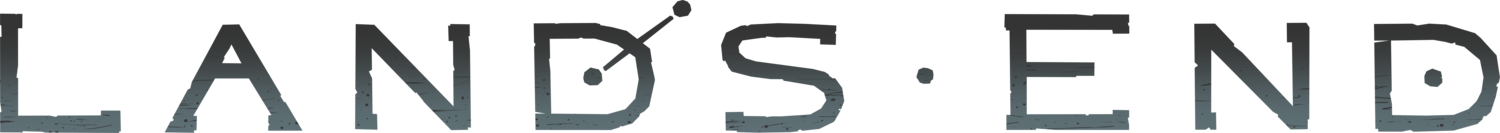
- Developer: Ustwo Games
- Platforms: Oculus Go; Samsung Gear VR
- Release: 21 September 2015
- Genre: Puzzle
- Mode: Single-player

Land's End is a 2015 indie puzzle virtual reality game developed by Ustwo Games.
