= Obfusc =

- Born: Joseph X. Burke; 1981 (age 43–44)
- Origin: Brooklyn, New York, United States
- Genres: Electronic, IDM, ambient, downtempo
- Years active: 2005–present
- Labels: Boltfish Recordings; Static Caravan Recordings; Expanding Electronic Diversity; INSTALL Sound
- Website: Obfusc.net

Obfusc is the name given to the musical output of Joseph X. Burke (born 1981), an American, Chicago-based graphic designer and photographer. Originally formed in Brooklyn in 2005 as an electronic music project, Obfusc has since evolved to include a greater array of live instrumentation and post-rock influence. Burke is most notably associated with London-based Boltfish Recordings, but has also released music through Static Caravan Recordings, Expanding Electronic Diversity, INSTALL Sound, and several other DIY labels. His music has been licensed for placement in the Netflix series "House of Cards", CBS Television's "CSI: Miami", the media campaign for Ustwo Games' "Monument Valley", and various web series, short films, and promotional videos.

== Discography ==
=== Albums ===
- Internal Countryside, 2006 (on Boltfish Recordings) - CD-R, Digital
- Cities of Cedar, 2008 (on Boltfish Recordings) - CD, Digital
- Midnight Dome, 2011 (on Boltfish Recordings) - CD, Digital

=== EPs ===
- Infinite Glimpse, 2016 (on Obfusc Music) - Digital
- Wrought From The Walls, 2005 (Self-Released) - CD-R, Digital

=== Singles ===
- "Inverted Island" (Day Mix) b/w "Oceanic Glow" (Night Mix), 2009 (on Static Caravan Recordings) - 7" Vinyl

=== Split releases ===
- Break It Into Pieces (with Cheju), 2005 (on Wyrd Skies Recordings) - CD-R, Digital
- Untitled (with David Tagg), 2009 (on INSTALL Sound) - 2 x 3" CD-R, Digital

=== Soundtracks ===
- Monument Valley (Original Soundtrack: Volumes I & II) (with Stafford Bawler & Grigori), 2016 (on iam8bit) - 2 x 12" Vinyl
- Monument Valley (Original Soundtrack) (with Stafford Bawler & Grigori), 2014 (on Ustwo Games) - Digital
- Neo Cab (Original Soundtrack) (with Chris Ward & Vincent Perea), 2019 (on Obfusc Music) - Digital

=== Music videos ===
- Before We Lose Our Legs, 2006 (Directed by Jason Banker)
- Amateur Cartography, 2008 (Directed by Jason Banker, featuring James Davidson)
