= Desta: The Memories Between =

2022 video games

- Developer: Ustwo
- Publishers: Netflix (mobile); Ustwo
- Composer: Mansur Brown
- Platforms: Android; iOS; Nintendo Switch; Windows
- Release: iOS, Android; WW: September 27, 2022; Windows, Switch; WW: April 26, 2023
- Genres: Turn-based tactics, sports
- Mode: Single-player

Desta: The Memories Between is a video game developed by Ustwo. It combines gameplay from turn-based tactics, physics, and sports video games. The mobile versions are available exclusively through Netflix Games and were released in 2022. Ustwo released the Windows and Switch versions in 2023.

== Gameplay ==
Players control Desta, a non-binary person returning to their hometown. Desta, who is anxious about meeting former friends, has anxiety dreams that play out as dodgeball games. These are played via turn-based combat using physics. People who Desta defeats in their dreams can join their team, and each person has unique abilities. If everyone on Desta's team is eliminated, players must start over from the start.

== Development ==
Ustwo were influenced by Hades and Into the Breach. Desta: The Memories Between was released for Android and iOS on September 27, 2022. The mobile version is available exclusively through Netflix Games for Netflix subscribers. Ustwo said they wanted to reach as large an audience as possible, which they felt Netflix would allow them to do. Netflix also brought their expertise with localization and translation. It was ported to Windows and Switch on April 26, 2023.

== Reception ==
Desta: The Memories Between received mixed reviews on Metacritic. GameSpot praised the tactical combat, soundtrack, art, and relatable premise, but they found the repetition from starting over frustrating and complained of dodgeball shots that sometimes did not work as expected. Pocket Gamer enjoyed the combat's creativity and options. They recommended it to patient gamers who can come up with a good strategy, which they said will allow them to avoid what they felt were harsh penalties for losing. NME found Desta: The Memories Between touching and relatable, though they found it repetitive. The Verge said, "Desta makes a strong case for Netflix as a viable mobile gaming platform".

It was nominated for best mobile game, best original intellectual property, and best narrative at the 2023 Develop:Star Awards.
