= Dungeon Village =

2012 video game

- Developer: Kairosoft
- Platforms: Android, iOS, Nintendo Switch
- Release: IOS/Android: NA: March 2, 2012; Nintendo Switch: WW: October 11, 2018
- Genre: Simulation
- Mode: Single player

Dungeon Village (冒険ダンジョン村, Bōken Danjon Mura) is a simulation video game developed and published by Kairosoft for the Android and iOS operating systems. It was released on March 2, 2012 for Android and iOS. The player is placed in control of a role-playing video game's town, and tasks the player with expanding the town and attracting heroes to live in it. It received mostly positive reviews from critics.

== Gameplay ==
Dungeon Village places the player in control of a village in a stereotypical RPG setting. The main goal of the game is to attract heroes to your town and direct them to fight monsters outside of the city's limits. In order to attract heroes, the player must have the city hold events which attract outside attention and fame, and must improve their city by building new buildings. As monsters arrive, the player can direct heroes to perform quests and give them gifts so they become more favorable to the city.

== Reception ==
Reception

Aggregate score
Aggregator	Score
Metacritic	84/100

Review scores
Publication	Score
IGN	8.0/10
TouchArcade	4/5

The game received mostly positive reviews from critics, who praised the setting and gameplay. IGN's Peter Eykemans called Dungeon Village one of the best Kairosoft games that had been released, noting that the setting was charming and the gameplay was addictive. Eurogamer's Chris Schilling highlighted the game as the website's "App of the Day", praised the addictive gameplay as well, and complimented the developer's sense of humor for playing on storied video game character names for the heroes' names. Gamezebo's Andy Chalk felt that despite the game's simplicity and confusing instructions, that it was incredibly hard to put down. Pocket Gamer's Damien McFarren called the game, "a resounding success for Kairosoft", and praised the game's premise as being more original than other titles in their game library had been.

Criticisms of the game mostly focused on its lack of re-playability. IGN's Peter Eykemans felt that the game had little point in a playthrough after beating it once, feeling that the high score system did not give the player enough incentive to play again. Pocket Gamer's Damien McFarren echoed Eykemans's criticism about the lack of re-playability.
