= Marlow Briggs and the Mask of Death =

2013 video game

- Cover art
- Developers: ZootFly; Microsoft Studios
- Publisher: 505 Games
- Producer: Dave McCrate
- Designer: Bostjan Troha
- Engine: ZEN
- Platforms: Xbox 360; Microsoft Windows
- Release: 20 September 2013
- Genres: Action-adventure, hack and slash
- Mode: Single-player

Marlow Briggs and the Mask of Death is a 2013 action-adventure game developed by ZootFly and Microsoft Studios for the Xbox 360 and Microsoft Windows. It was released worldwide on 20 September 2013.

== Gameplay ==
Marlow Briggs and the Mask of Death uses a real-time control scheme typical of other similar games, such as the God of War and Devil May Cry franchises. Players may attack with their weapon, grapple with and throw enemies, and use magical attacks. Weapons and spells can be upgraded using experience points. The player may launch a swift attack using one button and a slow, strong attack with another; combinations of the two attacks lead to combos. The player's current number of uninterrupted hits is kept counted on-screen, with greater rewards resulting from a higher count.

Briggs's main weapon is Kukulkan's Fangs, a double-ended scythe with obsidian blades. It has three alternative forms, serving as the game's other weapons: Tacab's Bloodthirsty Claws, a pair of curved swords wielded backhand with swift slashes; the Forsaken Sting, a long chain-whip with long reach but low damage output; and Patan's Tusk, a slow but powerful hammer. Briggs is also bestowed with a number of magical abilities. Spirit Knives allow him to strike foes at long range, the Conversion ability brainwashes enemies to fight alongside him, and the Wings of the Condor allow him to glide through the air. Four spells attack, one for each classical element, are also available: the "Flames of Kinich Ahau" and "Chaac's Freezing Wrath" strike all enemies near him; the "Strength of Cabrakan" earth attack strikes all foes in a line in front of him; and "Huracan's Winds" strikes all enemies on the screen.

== Plot ==
Marlow Briggs, a smokejumper, is vacationing at a Mayan archaeological dig operated by Heng Long. Briggs' girlfriend, Eva Torres, is employed deciphering various Mayan codices. Eva has begun to find the work unsavory, and attempts to resign; Long, however, still requires her services. To enforce Eva's compliance, Long has his lieutenant, Kim Carreras, kill Briggs with Kukulkan's Fangs. Unknown to all, the scythe is ornamented with the Mask of Death, which houses the spirit of a long-dead Mayan monarch, King Tepechalic Ix (also known as "Tep"). Tep, acting through the mask, revives Briggs and dubs him the "Sacred Warrior" (also known as the "Ek Chuah Ix", or "Chuchu" for short). Throughout the game Tep provides advice, exposition, and commentary on Briggs's combat abilities. Together, Briggs and Tep set out to defeat Long, rescue Eva, and shut down the mining operation Long has established.

Long drags Eva from site to site, having her translate a large variety of codices, all the while throwing vast quantities of manpower and materiel at Briggs in an attempt effort to slow him down. During this chase, Long begins to display supernatural powers, and Tep hypothesizes that Long is attempting to attain godlike power. To do this, he needs "TioxChoq'ik," a rare supernatural element which his facility is now mining; the Sacred Warrior's raison d'être is to prevent such an occurrence. Long needs Eva's translating skills to complete the ritual; Eva takes advantage of her protected position to drop periodic notes, which keep Briggs updated on her well-being and typically beg him to abandon her and save himself.

In addition to fighting his way through Long's security forces, Briggs must contend with the flora and fauna of the jungles, as well as demons manifesting as a result of Long's activities; occasionally Briggs encounters these forces in regular conflict with each other. Briggs eventually meets Kim Carreras, an associate of Long who eventually confesses to being a federal agent who was blackmailed into joining Long's operation, but draws the line at helping him become an evil god. She assists Briggs until her betrayal is revealed, at which point Long executes her.

Briggs and Tep eventually confront Long as the latter completes the last of his ritual atop the Mountain of Time, becoming a towering monstrosity with numerous powers at his disposal. In the ensuing fight, Briggs rips out Long's heart to no effect; only by decapitating Long and piercing his head with Kukulkan's Fangs is Briggs able to defeat him. This gives Briggs control of Long's powers and, at the Mask's urging, he rewinds time. Briggs and Eva climb out of the mine to return home only to find themselves amidst the historical Mayan empire, facing King Tep during his natural lifetime, with European sailing ships visible in the harbor beyond.

== Reception ==
Reception

Aggregate score
Aggregator	Score
Metacritic	(X360) 66/100 (PC) 65/100

Review scores
Publication	Score
4Players	79%
Edge	(X360) 5/10
GameSpot	(PC) 7/10
Jeuxvideo.com	(PC) 15/20
Official Xbox Magazine (UK)	(X360) 7/10
Official Xbox Magazine (US)	(X360) 6/10
PC Games (DE)	(PC) 75%
Polygon	(X360) 7/10
The Digital Fix	(X360) 7/10

The game received "mixed or average reviews" on both platforms according to the review aggregation website Metacritic.
