= Kairosoft =

Japanese video game developer

- Industry: Video games
- Founded: 1996 (original); September 2007 (incorporated); 2014 (large business)
- Founder: Kazuyuki Usui
- Headquarters: Nishi-Shinjuku, Tokyo, Japan
- Number of employees: 14
- Website: kairosoft.net

Kairosoft (Japanese: カイロソフト, Hepburn: Kairosofuto) is a Japanese video game developer located in Tokyo, Japan that has created a number of simulation games for cell phones, PCs, Nintendo Switch, PlayStation 4 and Xbox consoles. Founded in 1996, the company has developed a number of mobile games for the Japanese market and has found great success in porting them to the modern iOS and Android operating systems. The company was ranked 30th in Pocket Gamer's "top 50 developers of 2012" list.

== History ==
Kairosoft was founded as a dōjin games developer in 1996, and is currently located in the Nishi-Shinjuku district of Tokyo with only nine employees. They started out developing simulation games for the Windows platform, the first of which was released in 1996 and simulated a used bookstore, and another example was the original Game Dev Story released in 1997, with a sequel released in 2001. In 2001, Kairosoft switched to developing mobile simulation games for the Japanese cell phone market, which was much more developed than America's. The company was incorporated in September 2007, and launched a new website on November 4, 2008.

With the release of Game Dev Story for iOS and Android in 2010, Kairosoft found itself a large hit, which reached the top ten in iPhone app sales in its first week. Kairosoft continued to port over games that it had previously developed for other platforms. Pocket Gamer ranked Kairosoft 30th on its "top 50 developers of 2012" list, calling Kairosoft games a "genre in their own right" but noting that they still were mostly a niche in the market.

== Games ==
=== English games for WildTangent ===
Name	WildTangent release date	Latest update
Anime Studio Story	June 7, 2015	August 15, 2016 (1.19)
Beastie Bay	April 10, 2013	June 10, 2016 (3.12)
Biz Builder Delux	May 16, 2016	Not yet updated
Bonbon Cakery	August 23, 2016	Not yet updated
Legends of Heropolis	Christmas 2016	—N/a
Dungeon Village	August 15, 2013	June 30, 2016 (2.31)
The Manga Works	Thanksgiving 2016	Not yet updated
Skyforce Unite!	June 17, 2016	Not yet updated
Mega Mall Story	April 10, 2012	October 1, 2016 (4.15)
Magazine Mogul	August 15, 2015	June 17, 2016 (1.27)
Kairobotica	April 16, 2013	June 7, 2015 (2.51)
Game Dev Story	June 10, 2011	October 2, 2016 (5.83)

=== Mobile games available in English ===
Name	Play Store release date
The Manga Works	Aug 4, 2016
Game Dev Story	Dec 10, 2010
Boxing Gym Story	Feb 9, 2021
Tropical Resort Story	Jun 19, 2022
Grand Prix Story	Jun 8, 2011
Dream Park Story	Oct 1, 2021
Station Manager	Jun 8, 2016
Dungeon Village	Mar 2, 2012
Hot Springs Story 2	Nov 16, 2020
Home Run High	May 1, 2017
Mega Mall Story 2	May 21, 2019
Pocket Academy	Apr 25, 2012
Burger Bistro Story	May 7, 2021
Forest Camp Story	Jun 30, 2021
The Sushi Spinnery	Jul 3, 2012
Pool Slide Story	Dec 18, 2017
Silver Screen Story	Jun 5, 2019
The Ramen Sensei	May 1, 2015
Bonbon Cakery	Mar 5, 2015
Pocket League Story	Sep 7, 2011
Dream House Days	Jan 28, 2013
Pocket Harvest	Oct 30, 2013
Basketball Club Story	Jun 30, 2019
Legends of Heropolis	Jul 19, 2016
Beastie Bay	Sep 28, 2012
Dream Town Story	Dec 11, 2017
High Sea Saga	Feb 9, 2015
March to a Million	Jan 23, 2017
Kingdom Adventurers	Aug 29, 2019
Pocket Clothier	Jun 7, 2012
Pocket Academy ZERO	Dec 21, 2012
Pocket League Story 2	Jul 1, 2013
Grand Prix Story 2	Jul 3, 2017
The Ramen Sensei 2	Feb 15, 2018
Biz Builder Delux SP	Sep 20, 2017
Skyforce Unite!	Mar 24, 2016
Quest Town Saga	Jan 21, 2019
Cafeteria Nipponica SP	Apr 13, 2017
Jumbo Airport Story	Sep 26, 2022
Pocket Academy 3	Aug 16, 2022
Convenience Stories	Mar 28, 2022
Forest Golf Planner	Feb 20, 2022
Dungeon Village 2	Mar 9, 2021
Social Dev Story	Apr 22, 2019
Pocket Arcade Story DX	Mar 26, 2019
Kairo Land	Feb 21, 2018
Wild Park Manager	Jul 12, 2017
Shiny Ski Resort	Apr 7, 2017
8-Bit Farm	Feb 2, 2017
Magician's Saga	Jan 13, 2017
Thrift Store Story	Sep 29, 2016
Pocket Arcade Story	Jun 24, 2016
Tennis Club Story	Feb 2, 2016
Fish Pond Park	Apr 27, 2015
Anime Studio Story	Feb 2, 2015
Biz Builder Delux	Dec 25, 2014
Kairo Club	Feb 9, 2015
Magazine Mogul	May 6, 2014
Pocket Stables Lite	Aug 20, 2014
Ninja Village	Mar 24, 2013
Pocket Stables	Feb 21, 2013
The Pyraplex	Dec 13, 2012
Venture Towns	Sep 7, 2012
Kairobotica	Aug 2, 2012
Oh!Edo Towns	Jul 25, 2012
Cafeteria Nipponica	Apr 4, 2012
Mega Mall Story	Dec 29, 2011
Epic Astro Story	Dec 16, 2011
World Cruise Story	Nov 15, 2011
Hot Springs Story	Apr 15, 2011
Zoo Park Story	May 21, 2023
Dream Town Island	Jun 1, 2023
Cafe Master Story	Jun 26, 2023
TV Studio Story	Nov 21, 2023
Cavern Adventurers	Jan 16, 2024
Heian City Story	Jul 10, 2024
Doraemon Dorayaki Shop Story	Aug 27, 2024
Pro Wrestler Story	Oct 15, 2024
Skating Rink Story	Feb 18, 2025
Final Frontier Story	Jul 30, 2025
Demon Castle Story	Nov 25, 2025
Skyship Quest Story	Feb 9, 2026
Fashion Mall Story	Sep 30,2026
ONE PIECE : Grand Gourmet	October 22, 2026
KOCHIKAME : Ryo-san's Billion-yen Beat	TBA

=== Computer games available in English ===
Game Name	Platform	Ref.
Skyforce Unite	Windows 10	
Cafeteria Nipponica	Windows 8	
Departure!! Shipping Freighter	Windows 10	
Dragging Cat Rebel	Windows 8	
Excitement! Manga Dojo	Windows 8	
Pocket Arcade Story	Windows 10	
Manga Path	Windows 8/10	
Mega Mall Story	Windows 7/10	
March to a Million	Windows 7	
Munch Munch Kairo-kun	Not defined	
Thrift Store Story	Windows Vista/7/8	
Pool Slide Story	PS4	
Piko Piko! Game Expo	Windows 10	
Pocket Academy	Windows 7	
Pocket Academy ZERO	Windows 7	
Royal Gallery Academy	Windows Vista	
World Cruise Story	Windows 10	

=== Untranslated games ===
==== Mobile ====
- Departure!! Shipping Freighter (Android and Keitai only)
- Dragging Cat Rebel
- Excitement! Manga Dojo (iOS and Keitai only)
- Friends Entertainment Building
- Game Center Club
- Good Ramen Museum ~National Hen~
- Manga Path
- Munch Munch Kairo-kun
- Outdoor Excavation Company (Keitai only)
- Piko Piko! Game Expo (Keitai only)
- Prestigious Pocket Academy 1 (Android and Keitai only)
- Royal Gallery Academy (Keitai only)
- Social Game Dev Dream (Android and Keitai only)
- Start!! Hero Base
- Wai Wai! Game Dealer (iOS and Keitai only)
- Witch Quest

==== PC ====
- Bookstore Story
- Game Developing Countries
- Game Developing Countries II DX
- The Narrow Path to Manga
- The Secondhand-book Store
- The Secondhand-book Store 2
