= List of Black Hebrew Israelites =

This is a list of Hebrew Israelites.

== List ==
Name		Nationality	Notes
Eddie Butler	born 1972	Israel	Singer
Marcus Wayne Chenault, Jr.	1951–1995	United States	Murdered Martin Luther King's mother, Alberta Williams King.
Chingy	born 1980	United States	Rapper
Steve Cunningham	born 1976	United States	Boxer
Antoine Dodson	born 1986	United States	Internet celebrity
Arnold Josiah Ford	1877–1935	Barbados; United States	Spiritual leader
Capers Funnye	born 1952	United States	Rabbi
Kabeer Gbaja-Biamila	born 1977	United States	American football player
Brandon T. Jackson	born 1984	United States	Actor
Daniel Judah	born 1977	United States	Boxer
Josiah Judah	born 1978	United States	Boxer
Yoel Judah	born 1956	United States	Kickboxer and boxing trainer
Zab Judah	born 1977	United States	Boxer
Robert Mathis	born 1981	United States	American football player
Wentworth Arthur Matthew	1892–1973	Saint Kitts and Nevis; United States	Rabbi
Daniel Muir	born 1983	United States	American football player
Ben Ammi Ben-Israel	1939–2014	Israel	Spiritual leader
Killah Priest	born 1974	United States	Rapper
Robert Rozier	born 1955	United States	Murderer and American football player
Shawn Stockman	born 1972	United States	Singer
Yahweh ben Yahweh	1935–2007	United States	Cult leader and convicted criminal
