= Game Dev Story =

1997 simulation video game

- Developer: Kairosoft
- Publisher: WW: Kairosoft
- Platforms: Microsoft Windows; iOS; Android; Windows Phone; Nintendo Switch; PlayStation 4; Xbox One; Xbox Series X/S; Nintendo Switch 2
- Release: Microsoft Windows: JP: April 1997; iOS, Android: WW: October 9, 2010; Windows Phone: WW: July 6, 2015; Nintendo Switch: WW: October 11, 2018; PlayStation 4: WW: February 11, 2021; Steam: WW: March 27, 2022; Xbox One, Series X/S: WW: September 15, 2023; Nintendo Switch 2: WW: June 25, 2026
- Genre: Business simulation game
- Modes: Single player Multiplayer

Game Dev Story is a simulation video game developed and published by Kairosoft for Microsoft Windows, iOS, Android, and Nintendo Switch. It was released for Windows in April 1997, on iOS and Android on October 9, 2010, for Windows Phone on July 6, 2015, for Nintendo Switch on October 11, 2018, on PlayStation 4 on February 11, 2021, on Steam on March 27, 2022,, on Xbox One and Xbox Series X/S on September 15, 2023, and on Nintendo Switch 2 on June 25, 2026. The game follows a player-controlled video game company and its attempts to expand into a sales powerhouse over time. As a simulation, the game and the direction of the company is controlled by the player, following a parallel timeline of the video game industry and its history. The game was released to positive reviews, with many reviewers focusing on Game Dev Story's addictive aspects and its witty references to video game pop culture.

== Gameplay ==
The menu on the left-hand side of the screen allows the player to control the direction of their game studio, while the bottom menu row shows the sales of their currently released game.

The player takes control of a start-up video game developer, with the goal of making hit titles and consoles in order to make money. The user controls a number of factors which can help or hinder the quality of the games released, including hiring staff, controlling the direction and speed of development, and using items which give boosts for workers or change their jobs. As the player progresses and earns more money, their building is improved upon and they are allowed to hire more staff, and thus create better games.

Games are assigned review scores upon completion of a game ranging from 1–10 with a comment from the associated reviewer with his score. The scores generally affect the sales that go along with the game, and as they are in real life, sales are ranked with a number according to how they sold that week.

When the player reaches the Hall of Fame level, they can make sequels to their game. To reach the Hall of Fame, the player needs to get the critics to give a score of at least 32.

== Development ==
The original Game Dev Story was released in Japan for Microsoft Windows in April 1997. It was ported in 2010 to both iOS and Android.

A Windows Phone port was released in July 2015. It was also later released on Nintendo Switch and PlayStation 4 on October 11, 2018 and February 11, 2021 respectively.

== Reception ==
Reception

Aggregate score
| Aggregator | Score |
|---|---|
| Metacritic | iOS: 86/100 |

Review scores
| Publication | Score |
|---|---|
| Eurogamer | iOS: 9/10 |
| Giant Bomb | iOS: 4/5 |
| IGN | iOS: 9.0/10 |
| TouchArcade | iOS: 5/5 |

Game Dev Story received positive reviews, praising the addictiveness of its mechanics and its somewhat realistic treatment of video game development. It received an 86/100 on Metacritic. The A.V. Club praised the game's freedom for the player's choice in how they choose to develop their company. Eurogamer's Keza MacDonald described Game Dev Story as "the best thing I've ever played on the iPhone" and praised the game for its unpredictable and addictive simulation gameplay. Ron Gilbert, the original creator of the Monkey Island video game series, told Wired that he was a self-proclaimed addict to the game.

Criticism of the game mostly focused on the end-period of the game. Pocket Gamer felt that Game Dev Story slowed down towards the end of the game because it became too easy to churn out successful games at a quick pace. Giant Bomb's Ryan Davis felt that although the game's menu system was clunky, Game Dev Story contained a large amount of charm and addictiveness that made it worth playing. Thunderbolt felt that the game would only appeal to those who understood the video game industry.

== See also ==
- Game Dev Tycoon, a similar game made by Greenheart Games
