= Whale Trail =

2011 video game

- App icon
- Developer: Ustwo
- Publisher: Ustwo
- Platforms: iOS, Android
- Release: iOS; October 20, 2011; Android; October 23, 2011
- Genre: Endless runner
- Mode: Single-player

Whale Trail is a mobile game developed by British software company Ustwo and released in October 2011. The game follows Willow the Whale as he flies through the sky, trying to get away from Baron von Barry, the squid-like antagonist. Whale Trail is an endless runner game, where the player tries to collect bubbles to allow them to keep flying, while avoiding clouds. The game cost over £150,000 to develop and went through months of design work and beta-testing.

== Development ==
We needed to make something that appealed to the masses while also retaining a look and feel we felt comfortable with. We see an awful lot of tired and depressing game design releases with no real personality or style.

— Matt Mills, speaking about his inspiration for Whale Trail

Whale Trail was developed by British indie studio ustwo. The company was founded in 2004 by two friends who had just two laptop computers. The company grew quickly and became one of the largest client service-based game developers. Matt Mills, the founder of ustwo, stated that some of his inspiration for Whale Trail came from the game Tiny Wings. Mills believed that Tiny Wings created a want for similar "one-touch mechanic" games, which only require the player to occasionally interact with gameplay. According to Mills, "The release of Tiny Wings was inspirational in that it taught me that very simple mechanics could go all the way to the top." Mills' said that he hoped to make a game that would be liked by all types of gamers and would "appeal to the widest demographic possible", but at the same time would keep a design that the company would like and that would "be loved by the design conscious".

Developmental work for Whale Trail began with a prototyping phase, where the goal was "to explore as many different directions as possible and to see what ultimately turned us on." The company based the process around the idea that "we could polish anything we came up with" but that they could "make sure that we had an engine this time that could drive us all the way to the top." The prototyping ended up taking two months to complete and was concluded when they decided on a loop-the-loop mechanic game.

== Reception ==
The game has a Metacritic score of 84% based on 15 critic reviews.

The A.V. Club said, "Whale Trail is just plain awesome." Modojo wrote, "One of the finest games we've had the privilege of experiencing. It joins Tiny Wings, Angry Birds and Cut the Rope as a handful of quality titles you must absolutely have on either your iPhone or iPad." TouchArcade wrote, "Whale Trail contains all the components of a hit iOS game – colorful visuals, catchy music, a cute main character, and gameplay that's easy for anybody to pick up but hard to master. But somehow, it manages to not feel forced or contrived." AppSafari said, "Whale Trail's gameplay is simple yet addictive, making it the perfect kind of game for an iPhone. " AppGamer said, "While the perfectly balanced scoring system encourages replays, it's really the presentation, effort and generally cute 60's vibe that makes Whale Trail stand out, alongside that instantly memorable soundtrack from Gruff Rhys. Whale Trail is a refreshing blast of multicoloured fun that will brighten up even the darkest day." AppSmile said, "Replay value is great, as the endless nature gives you plenty of opportunity to best your score and compete against others." 148Apps said, "Just an absolute joy. With mechanics that are nearly perfect, and a style that is difficult to out-do, this is a game that must be checked out by anyone who likes endless runner games, or anyone who just likes to feel happy while they play. This game is just fun."

Multiplayer.it said, "Whale Trail is one of the best 'endless run' on the App Store, thanks to the fantastic mix between atmosphere and gameplay. A great level design and the particular soundtrack complete an already splendid picture." 4Players.de wrote, "Within the overcrowded genre of 'endless runners' Whale Trail stands out thanks to its psychedelic artdesign, while the mechanics are similar to the likes of Tiny Wings or Jetpack Joyride." AppSpy said, "'Been there, done that' isn't quite fair to say of a game like Whale Trail. Although it may seem like yet another endless title, its stellar level of presentation; clever level layout variation; and simple control scheme make it worth checking out, even if it doesn't last forever." Gamezebo said, "Simple to play, utterly charming, and completely addictive, Whale Trail has all the makings of a great mobile game." Pocket Gamer UK wrote, "A charming confection that's impossible not to like, with stellar production values and solid gameplay." SlideToPlay said, "Whale Trail is like a pleasant psychedelic daydream that's over before you know it." Edge Magazine wrote, "It's a breezily entertaining flight through seven coloured environments, though it never quite generates the same feeling of mastery as its inspiration: reaching the Violet Zone for the second time isn't as significant an achievement as diving down to the undulating surface of Island 9." Tap! wrote, "Be mindful, though, that beyond the visuals, the game offers little new, so don't expect to still be playing it in a year's time."
