= Dandara (video game) =

2018 video game

- Developer: Long Hat House
- Publisher: Raw Fury
- Designers: Joao Brant, Lucas Mattos
- Artist: Victor F. Leão
- Composer: Thommaz Kauffmann
- Engine: Unity
- Platforms: Android, iOS, Linux, macOS, Windows, Nintendo Switch, PlayStation 4, Xbox One
- Release: 6 February 2018
- Genres: Platformer, metroidvania
- Mode: Single-player

Dandara is a 2018 2D platformer and Metroidvania video game developed by Brazilian studio Long Hat House and published by Raw Fury in 2018.

== Gameplay ==
Dandara is a 2D platformer and Metroidvania game. Players take control of the eponymous protagonist who traverses the game's world by warping between white surfaces. The game's protagonist and themes are based on the life of Brazilian historical figure Dandara dos Palmares.

== Development and release ==
Dandara was developed by Brazilian studio Long Hat House and published by Raw Fury. The game was released for Android, iOS, Linux, macOS, Windows, Nintendo Switch, PlayStation 4 and Xbox One on 6 February 2018.

== Reception ==
Reception

Aggregate score
Aggregator	Score
Metacritic	iOS: 81/100; NS: 73/100; PC: 70/100

Review scores
Publication	Score
Edge	5/10
GameSpot	7/10
PC Gamer (UK)	68/100
TouchArcade	5/5

Reception towards Dandara was generally mixed, leaning towards positive. It was better accepted in publications centered towards mobile platforms, showing its origins as a touchscreen-first game.

Dandara received a nomination for "Portable Game of the Year" during the 22nd Annual D.I.C.E. Awards.
