= Date Everything! =

2025 video game

- Developer: Sassy Chap Games
- Publisher: Team17
- Designer: Ray Chase
- Engine: Unity
- Platforms: Nintendo Switch; PlayStation 5; Windows; Xbox Series X/S
- Release: June 17, 2025
- Genres: Dating sim, visual novel
- Mode: Single-player

Date Everything! is a sandbox dating sim developed by Sassy Chap Games and published by Team17. The game revolves around the player character forming relationships with anthropomorphized versions of everyday objects around their house. It was released on June 17, 2025, for Nintendo Switch, PlayStation 5, Windows and Xbox Series X/S. The game received positive reviews, with praise aimed at its concept, humor, and voice acting.

== Gameplay ==
Date Everything takes place entirely within a single suburban home. In the game, the player receives a pair of "Dateviator" glasses, which allow their user to "Directly Acknowledge a Thing's Existence" — or D.A.T.E. — when pointed at something. This can range from everyday objects, such as a shelf, towel, or refrigerator, to more abstract things such as air and the concept of existential dread. When the player begins a D.A.T.E., the object will appear as an anthropomorphized version of itself, and can engage in direct conversation. There are 100 "dateables" in the game, and the player is able to interact with up to five per in-game day, with these interactions affecting their relationships with each dateable. Players can develop one of three relationship outcomes with each dateable—love, friendship, or hate—depending on dialogue choices and interactions, with the game providing different endings based on the player's relationships. After reaching a non-hate relationship with a dateable, and acquiring sufficient stat points, the player is given the option to "Realize" them, turning them from an abstract entity into a real human. "Realizing" every dateable can be seen as the overall goal of the game.

== Development and release ==
Date Everything is the first game developed by Sassy Chap Games, a studio formed by professional voice actors Ray Chase, Robbie Daymond, and Max Mittelman. The three had previously collaborated on several creative ventures, and in 2018 decided they wanted to try making a video game. While informally brainstorming, Daymond suggested a game where the player could date inanimate objects, and Chase opted to pursue the idea, becoming the game's lead designer and creative director. Roughly four years were spent developing a vertical slice and pitching the game to publishers, though progress briefly stalled due to a lack of publisher interest and complications from the COVID-19 pandemic. Early versions of the game featured escape room elements, but these were removed because the team thought it wasn't much fun and made the game too linear, leading to the sandbox approach instead. In 2022, Team17 agreed to publish the game.

The game's script features over 1.2 million words, with more than 11,000 hand-drawn art assets. It also features full voice acting, with over 70,000 voice lines by an ensemble cast of over 100 actors. In addition to Chase, Daymond, and Mittelman, some other notable cast members include Emily Axford, Eric Bauza, Troy Baker, Laura Bailey, Dante Basco, Ashly Burch, SungWon Cho, Felicia Day, Erika Ishii, Erica Lindbeck, Matthew Mercer, Brennan Lee Mulligan, Cherami Leigh, Neil Newbon, Dana Snyder, and Ben Starr. Daymond noted that because many of the cast were their friends and colleagues, it allowed them to secure talent who would not normally voice in a game of this style. When recording with the actors, Daymond and voice director Amanda Hufford would perform the player character's lines, allowing the actor to properly react in their performance.

Date Everything was originally announced to be released for Nintendo Switch, PlayStation 5, Windows and Xbox Series X/S on February 14, 2025, to coincide with Valentine's Day. However, the game was later delayed, releasing digitally on June 17. Physical versions of the game are scheduled to be released at a later date. A "Lavish Edition" of the game includes a digital artbook and soundtrack, additional cosmetics for the player's phone, and two more dateable characters, allowing the player to date a microtransaction and the Lavish Edition content itself.

== Reception ==
Reception

Aggregate score
Aggregator	Score
Metacritic	(NS) 78/100 (PC) 78/100; 74/100 (PS5); 85/100 (XSXS)

Review scores
Publication	Score
Destructoid	9/10
GamesRadar+	3/5
Hardcore Gamer	4/5
Nintendo Life	6/10
Nintendo World Report	8.5/10
Push Square	8/10
RPGFan	82/100
Shacknews	7/10

Date Everything received "generally favorable" reviews for the Nintendo Switch, Windows and Xbox Series X/S versions while the PlayStation 5 version received "mixed or average" reviews, according to review aggregator Metacritic. In 2025, it was a finalist for a TIGA award in the "Narrative/Storytelling" category.

== See also ==
- Object sexuality
