= Mage Gauntlet =

2011 mobile video game

- Developer: Rocketcat Games
- Director: Kepa Auwae
- Designers: Jeremy Orlando, Kepa Auwae, Brandon Rhodes
- Composer: Jeremy Orlando
- Platforms: iOS, Android
- Release: October 20, 2011
- Genre: Action-adventure
- Mode: Single-player

Mage Gauntlet is an iOS action-adventure game developed by American studio Rocketcat Games and released on October 20, 2011. The player controls Lexi in search of a way to defeat the demon Lord Hurgoroth, and prevent him from taking over the world.

== Gameplay ==
Mage Gauntlet is a 2D game with live-action type of game mechanics and pixel graphics.

== Reception ==
Reception

Aggregate score
| Aggregator | Score |
|---|---|
| Metacritic | 84/100 |

Review score
| Publication | Score |
|---|---|
| TouchArcade | 5/5 |

The game has a Metacritic score of 84/100 based on 15 critic reviews.
