= War Machine in other media =

Appearances of War Machine in cinema, television and video games

Adaptations of War Machine in other media
- Created by: David Michelinie; John Byrne; Bob Layton
- Original source: Comics published by Marvel Comics
- First appearance: Iron Man #118 (January 1979)

Films and television
- Film(s): The Invincible Iron Man (2007); Iron Man (2008); Iron Man 2 (2010); Iron Man: Rise of Technovore (2013); Iron Man 3 (2013); Avengers Confidential: Black Widow and Punisher (2014); Avengers: Age of Ultron (2015); Captain America: Civil War (2016); Avengers: Infinity War (2018); Avengers: Endgame (2019)
- Television show(s): Iron Man (1994); Iron Man: Armored Adventures (2009); The Avengers: Earth's Mightiest Heroes (2010); Marvel Disk Wars: The Avengers (2014); The Falcon and the Winter Soldier (2021)

Games
- Video game(s): Iron Man 2 (2010)

James Rhodes is a Marvel Comics character that has appeared in comics featuring or related to Iron Man since 1979. The character has appeared in other media adaptations of Iron Man both as a non-costumed character and as War Machine.

Most of the character's appearances have been in animation, but in the Marvel Cinematic Universe, the character is played successively by Terrence Howard and Don Cheadle.

== Television ==
War Machine as appeared in the Iron Man animated series.

War Machine as he appears in Iron Man: Armored Adventures.

- War Machine appears in Iron Man (1994), voiced by James Avery in the first five episodes and by Dorian Harewood for the rest. This version is a member of Force Works before the team disbands in the second season. Additionally, he struggles with claustrophobia after almost drowning in his armor.
- War Machine makes non-speaking cameo appearances in X-Men: The Animated Series.
- War Machine appears in Spider-Man: The Animated Series, voiced again by James Avery.
- War Machine appears in The Incredible Hulk episode "Helping Hand, Iron Fist", voiced again by Dorian Harewood.
- A teenage James "Rhodey" Rhodes / War Machine appears in Iron Man: Armored Adventures, voiced by Daniel Bacon. This version is a student at the Tomorrow Academy. During the first season, Rhodey and his family take in Tony after Howard Stark's apparent death. Additionally, Rhodey serves as Iron Man's tactical aide-de-campe and voice of reason before receiving the War Machine armor.
- War Machine appears in The Super Hero Squad Show episode "Tales of Suspense!", voiced by LeVar Burton.
- James Rhodes / War Machine appears in The Avengers: Earth's Mightiest Heroes, voiced by Bumper Robinson. This version is a founding member of the New Avengers.
- James Rhodes / War Machine appears in Marvel Disk Wars: The Avengers, voiced by Hidenori Takahashi in Japanese and Keith Silverstein in English.

== Film ==
- An original incarnation of War Machine, Howard Stark, appears in early screenplay drafts written by Alfred Gough, Miles Millar, and David Hayter for New Line Cinema's Iron Man (2008).
- James Rhodes appears in The Invincible Iron Man, voiced by Rodney Saulsberry. This version is an engineer and former army medic.
- War Machine appears in Iron Man: Rise of Technovore, voiced by James C. Mathis III in the English version and Hiroki Yasumoto in the Japanese version.
- War Machine appears in Avengers Confidential: Black Widow & Punisher.
- War Machine appears in Lego Marvel Avengers: Climate Conundrum, voiced by Alex Barima.

== Marvel Cinematic Universe ==
James "Rhodey" Rhodes appears in media set in the Marvel Cinematic Universe (MCU), portrayed initially by Terrence Howard and subsequently by Don Cheadle following a contract dispute between Howard and Marvel Studios.

== Video games ==
- War Machine appears as a playable character in Marvel vs. Capcom: Clash of Super Heroes, voiced by Wayne Ward. Additionally, a golden version appears as a hidden character.
- War Machine appears as a playable character in Marvel vs. Capcom 2: New Age of Heroes, voiced again by Wayne Ward.
- War Machine's armor appears as an alternate skin for Iron Man in X-Men Legends II: Rise of Apocalypse.
- War Machine's armor appears as an alternate skin for Iron Man in most versions of Marvel: Ultimate Alliance and as a playable character in the PC version.
- James Rhodes appears in Iron Man (2008), voiced by Terrence Howard.
- War Machine appears as a boss in the PlayStation 3 and Xbox 360 versions of Marvel: Ultimate Alliance 2, voiced by Nolan North. This version supports Iron Man in defending the Registration Acts.
- War Machine appears in Marvel Super Hero Squad, voiced again by Nolan North.
- War Machine appears as a playable character in Iron Man 2, voiced by Don Cheadle, with additional dialogue provided by Phil LaMarr.
- War Machine's armor appears as an alternate skin for Iron Man in Marvel vs. Capcom 3: Fate of Two Worlds and Ultimate Marvel vs Capcom 3. Additionally, he makes a cameo appearance in Hawkeye's ending in the latter game as a member of the West Coast Avengers.
- War Machine appears as a playable character in Marvel Super Hero Squad Online, voiced by Alimi Ballard.
- War Machine appears in Iron Man 3: The Official Game, voiced by Ty Jones.
- War Machine appears as a playable character in Marvel Avengers Alliance.
- War Machine appears as a playable character in Lego Marvel Super Heroes, voiced again by Phil LaMarr.
- War Machine appears as a playable character in Marvel Heroes, again voiced by James C. Mathis III.
- War Machine appears as a playable character in Marvel Contest of Champions.
- War Machine appears as a playable character in Marvel: Future Fight.
- A teenage version of War Machine appears in Marvel Avengers Academy, voiced by Adande Thorne.
- War Machine appears as a playable character in Lego Marvel's Avengers, voiced again by Don Cheadle.
- War Machine appears as a playable character in Lego Marvel Super Heroes 2.
- War Machine appears as a playable character in Marvel Future Revolution.
- War Machine appears as a playable character in Marvel Super War.
- War Machine appears as a battle pass skin in Fortnite Battle Royale.
