= Ustwo =

British software developer

Ustwo Fampany Limited
- Type: Private
- Industry: Software development, video games, mobile apps
- Founded: 15 November 2004; 21 years ago
- Founders: Matt Miller; John Sinclair
- Headquarters: London, England
- Area served: Worldwide
- Products: Monument Valley; Monument Valley 2 DICE
- Number of employees: 260 (2019)
- Website: ustwo.com

Ustwo Fampany Limited (typically stylized as ustwo) is a London-based software development studio focused on digital design, such as clean and elegant user interfaces. Founded in 2004, the company helped clients by supporting their mobile apps and developed mobile games, but broke through with a video game, Monument Valley in 2014.

== History ==
Ustwo was founded by Matt "Mills" Miller and John "Sinx" Sinclair in the Shoreditch district of London in November 2004 as "Ustwo Studio, Ltd", aiming to get into the nascent mobile app market. Miller and Sinclair had been friends since they were eleven, and so the name "Ustwo" is in reference to their long-term relation, "us two".

Miller and Sinclair had been working at a design firm called Big Animal who had Sony as a client, and after founding Ustwo they were hired by Sony Ericsson to help design a user interface. Additional work came from similar word-of-mouth for banking firm JPMorgan.

They had limited success selling on Apple's App Store outside of one title, MouthOff (2009), which had a cartoon mouth on screen mimick mouth movements on hearing speech. The app earned Ustwo £100,000, in part due to reviews in Creative Review and other publications, according to Miller. MouthOff led to them gaining work from retail chain H&M. They then developed Whale Trail in 2011, a children's game, which led to a deal with Penguin Group for an ebook and television series, and Blip Blop in 2012.

Ustwo's breakout title came in 2014 with Monument Valley. It was praised by critics and was named the Apple Store's Editors Choice, later winning the Apple Design Award in 2014. The game has since sold more than US$14 million in revenue from over 26 million copies sold. Monument Valley 2 was a headline presentation at the 2017 Apple Worldwide Developers Conference, and their next major title Assemble with Care was one of the premiere titles available on launch of Apple Arcade in September 2019. Assemble with Care was later ported to Microsoft Windows and released on March 26, 2020.

Ustwo renamed themselves as "Ustwo Fampany Ltd." in 2015, with "fampany" representing their desire to have their studio to be a combination of "family" and "company".

In 2019, Ustwo fired an employee for labour organizing at the company. The Independent Workers' Union of Great Britain, which represents him through Game Workers Unite UK, filed suit on the worker's behalf. Lana Polansky of Waypoint criticized Ustwo for adopting progressive language and values to camouflage workplace issues and union busting activities.

As of 2022, Ustwo had studios in Malmö, Lisbon, Tokyo, and New York in addition to the London headquarters, employing about 260 employees worldwide.

== Games developed ==
Year	Title	Platform(s)
2011	Whale Trail	Android, iOS
2012	Papa Quash	iOS
2013	Blip Blup	Android, iOS
2014	Monument Valley	Android, iOS, Microsoft Windows, Windows Phone
2015	Land's End	Oculus Go, Samsung Gear VR
2017	Monument Valley 2	Android, iOS, Microsoft Windows
2019	Assemble with Care	iOS, Microsoft Windows
2019	Headed South	Android
2020	Go Go Bots	Browser
2020	Alba: A Wildlife Adventure	iOS, macOS, Microsoft Windows, Nintendo Switch, PlayStation 4, PlayStation 5, tvOS, Xbox One, Xbox Series X and Series S
2022	Desta: The Memories Between	Android, iOS, Microsoft Windows, Nintendo Switch
2024	Monument Valley 3	Android, macOS, iOS, iPadOS, visionOS, Microsoft Windows, Nintendo Switch, PlayStation 4, PlayStation 5, Xbox One, Xbox Series X and Series S (Previously available on Netflix Games)
