= E3 2013 =

19th annual Electronic Entertainment Expo

Electronic Entertainment Expo 2013
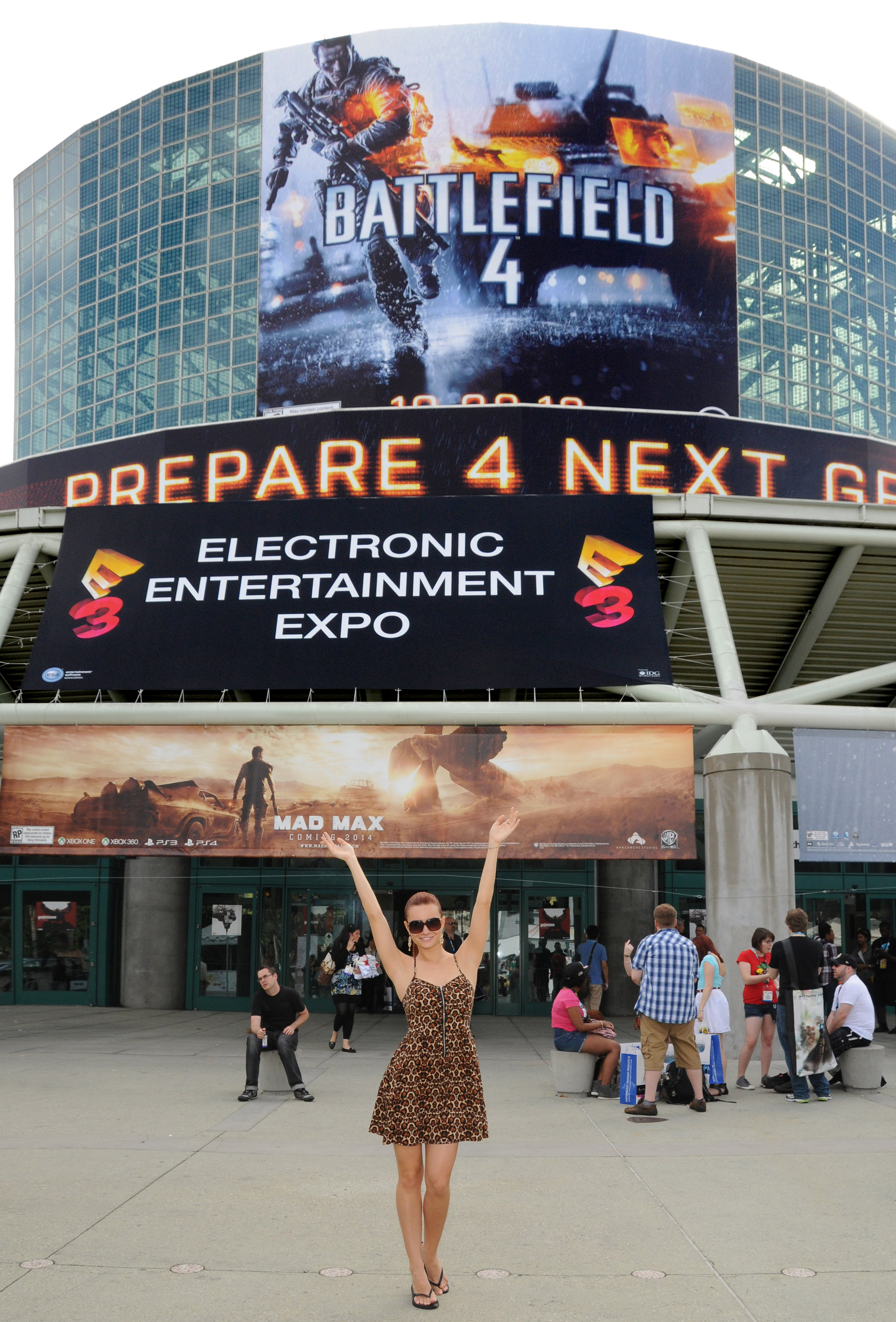
- E3 2013 at the Los Angeles Convention Center showing the South Hall Entrance
- Genre: Multi-genre
- Begins: June 11, 2013
- Ends: June 13, 2013
- Venue: Los Angeles Convention Center
- Locations: Los Angeles, California
- Country: United States
- Previous event: E3 2012
- Next event: E3 2014
- Attendance: 48,200
- Organizer: Entertainment Software Association
- Filing status: Non-profit

The Electronic Entertainment Expo 2013 (E3 2013) was the 19th E3 held. The event took place at the Los Angeles Convention Center in Los Angeles, California, with many press conferences taking place at nearby venues including the Nokia Theater, Galen Center, and the Los Angeles Memorial Sports Arena. It began on June 11, 2013, and ended on June 13, 2013, with 48,200 total attendees.

The main highlights included details of two major next-generation consoles, Microsoft's Xbox One and Sony's PlayStation 4, as well as Nintendo's unveilings of Super Mario 3D World, Mario Kart 8, and Super Smash Bros. for Nintendo 3DS and Wii U.

== Press conferences ==
Konami, Microsoft, Electronic Arts, Ubisoft, and Sony all hosted press conferences during the conference. However, Nintendo took a different approach by holding no traditional press conference. Instead, Nintendo held "a few smaller events that are specifically focused on our software lineup", and aired a special episode of Nintendo Direct to focus on upcoming U.S. releases and new game unveilings.

=== Konami ===
Konami held its 3rd annual pre-E3 show on June 6. The presentation showcased the company's 40th anniversary and its Dance Dance Revolution: Classroom Edition initiative, before providing updates on upcoming game releases. This included the games Castlevania: Lords of Shadow 2, Pro Evolution Soccer 2014 and Metal Gear Solid V: The Phantom Pain.

=== Microsoft ===
Microsoft's press conference took place on June 10 at the Galen Center at 9:30am. The company announced a November 2013 release date for its forthcoming Xbox One console, priced at $499. The software lineup was also revealed, including Dead Rising 3, Forza Motorsport 5, Quantum Break, Ryse: Son of Rome and the next installment of Halo, later revealed to be Halo 5: Guardians.

Controversy arose during Microsoft's showcase of Killer Instinct when an apparent reference to rape was made between the on-stage demonstrators. Microsoft later apologized for the incident and stated that the remarks were not scripted.

=== Electronic Arts ===
Electronic Arts' press conference took place on June 10 at the Nokia Theater at 1:00pm. Among the new titles shown were the racing game Need for Speed: Rivals, the parkour simulator Mirror's Edge Catalyst and the first-person shooters Battlefield 4 and Titanfall. EA Sports announced a number of new releases, such as Madden NFL 25, NBA Live 14, FIFA 14, NHL 14 and EA Sports UFC.

=== Ubisoft ===
Ubisoft's press conference took place on June 10 at 3:00pm. Upcoming action-adventure games included Watch Dogs and the sequels Assassin's Creed IV: Black Flag and Tom Clancy's Splinter Cell: Blacklist. Two new franchises – The Crew and The Division – were also announced.

=== Sony ===
Sony's press conference took place on June 10 at the Los Angeles Memorial Sports Arena at 6:00pm. The PlayStation 4 was publicly shown for the first time, retailing at $399. The software lineup included Infamous: Second Son, The Order: 1886, Driveclub, Final Fantasy XV and Killzone: Shadow Fall. There were also new games introduced for the PlayStation 3, such as Gran Turismo 6, Beyond: Two Souls and The Last of Us.

=== Nintendo ===
The E3 edition of Nintendo Direct aired at June 11 at 7:00am. Nintendo first showed a new trailer for the Nintendo 3DS titles Pokémon X and Y, including the announcement of a new Pokémon type, Fairy Type. After that, Nintendo focused mostly on showing upcoming Wii U titles. Nintendo showed some of the third-party and digital titles coming to the Wii U, and more about previously announced games such as X, The Wonderful 101, The Legend of Zelda: The Wind Waker HD, and the first gameplay footage of Bayonetta 2. Among the new games announced for Wii U were the new installments of Super Smash Bros., Super Smash Bros. for Nintendo 3DS and Super Smash Bros. for Wii U, Super Mario 3D World, Mario Kart 8, and Donkey Kong Country: Tropical Freeze.

== List of notable exhibitors ==
This is a list of major video game exhibitors who made appearances at E3 2013.

- 505 Games
- Activision Blizzard
- Atlus
- Bethesda
- Capcom
- CD Projekt Red
- Deep Silver
- Disney
- Electronic Arts
- Konami
- Microsoft
- Namco Bandai
- Nintendo
- Sega
- Sony
- Square Enix
- Tecmo Koei
- Ubisoft
- Warner Bros.
- XSEED Games

== List of featured games ==
This is a list of notable titles that appeared at E3 2013.

505 Games: Brothers: A Tale of Two Sons (PC / PS3 / Xbox 360); Activision Blizzard: Call of Duty: Ghosts (PC / PS3 / PS4 / Wii U / Xbox 360 / Xbox One); Deadpool (PC / PS3 / Xbox 360); Destiny (PS3 / PS4 / Xbox 360 / Xbox One); Skylanders: Swap Force (3DS / PS3 / PS4 / Wii / Wii U / Xbox 360 / Xbox One); Atlus: Daylight (PC / PS4); Dragon's Crown (PS3 / PS Vita); Etrian Odyssey Untold: The Millennium Girl (3DS); Shin Megami Tensei IV (3DS); R.I.P.D. The Game (PC / PS3 / Xbox 360); Bethesda: The Elder Scrolls Online (PC / PS4 / Xbox One); The Evil Within (PC / PS3 / PS4 / Xbox 360 / Xbox One); Wolfenstein: The New Order (PC / PS3 / PS4 / Xbox 360 / Xbox One); Capcom: Dead Rising 3 (Xbox One); DuckTales: Remastered (PC / PS3 / Wii U / Xbox 360); Lost Planet 3 (PC / PS3 / Xbox 360); Phoenix Wright: Ace Attorney - Dual Destinies (3DS); Deep Silver: Saints Row IV (PC / PS3 / Xbox 360); Disney: Disney Infinity (3DS / PC / PS3 / Wii / Wii U / Xbox 360); Fantasia: Music Evolved (Xbox 360 / Xbox One); Electronic Arts: Battlefield 4 (PC / PS3 / PS4 / Xbox 360 / Xbox One); Command & Conquer (PC); Dragon Age: Inquisition (PC / PS3 / PS4 / Xbox 360 / Xbox One); EA Sports UFC (PS4 / Xbox One); FIFA 14 (3DS / PC / PS2 / PS3 / PS4 / PSP / PS Vita / Wii / Xbox 360 / Xbox One); Madden NFL 25 (PS3 / PS4 / Xbox 360 / Xbox One); Mirror's Edge 2 (PC / PS4 / Xbox One); NBA Live 14 (PS4 / Xbox One); Need for Speed: Rivals (PC / PS3 / PS4 / Xbox 360 / Xbox One); NHL 14 (PS3 / Xbox 360); Plants vs. Zombies: Garden Warfare (PC / Xbox 360 / Xbox One); Star Wars: Battlefront (PC / PS4 / Xbox One); Titanfall (PC / Xbox 360 / Xbox One); Konami: Castlevania: Lords of Shadow 2 (PC / PS3 / Xbox 360); Pro Evolution Soccer 2014 (PC / PS3 / Xbox 360); Metal Gear Solid V: The Phantom Pain (PS3 / PS4 / Xbox 360 / Xbox One)	Microsoft: Below (Xbox One); Crimson Dragon (Xbox One); D4 (Xbox One); Forza Motorsport 5 (Xbox One); Halo (Xbox One); Halo: Spartan Assault (Windows 8 PC / Windows Phone 8); Killer Instinct (Xbox One); Kinect Sports Rivals (Xbox One); LocoCycle (Xbox 360 / Xbox One); Minecraft: Xbox One Edition (Xbox One); Project Spark (PC / Xbox One); Quantum Break (Xbox One); Ryse: Son of Rome (Xbox One); Sunset Overdrive (Xbox One); Namco Bandai: Dark Souls II (PC / PS3 / Xbox 360); Project X Zone (3DS); Tales of Xillia (PS3); Tekken Revolution (PS3); Time and Eternity (PS3); Nintendo: Bayonetta 2 (Wii U); Donkey Kong Country: Tropical Freeze (Wii U); Devil's Third (Wii U); Game & Wario (Wii U); The Legend of Zelda: A Link Between Worlds (3DS); The Legend of Zelda: The Wind Waker HD (Wii U); Mario & Luigi: Dream Team (3DS); Mario Kart 8 (Wii U); New Super Luigi U (Wii U); Pikmin 3 (Wii U); Pokémon X and Y (3DS); Super Mario 3D World (Wii U); Super Smash Bros. for Nintendo 3DS and Wii U (3DS / Wii U); Wii Fit U (Wii U); Wii Party U (Wii U); The Wonderful 101 (Wii U); X (Wii U); Yoshi's New Island (3DS); Sega: Castle of Illusion Starring Mickey Mouse HD (PC / PS3 / Xbox 360); Company of Heroes 2 (PC); Mario & Sonic at the Sochi 2014 Olympic Winter Games (Wii U); Sonic Lost World (3DS / Wii U); Total War: Rome II (PC)	Sony: Beyond: Two Souls (PS3); Driveclub (PS4); Gran Turismo 6 (PS3); Infamous: Second Son (PS4); Killzone: Mercenary (PS Vita); Killzone: Shadow Fall (PS4); Knack (PS4); The Last of Us (PS3); The Order: 1886 (PS4); Puppeteer (PS3); Tearaway (PS Vita); Square Enix: Deus Ex: The Fall (Android / iOS); Final Fantasy XV (PS4 / Xbox One); Kingdom Hearts III (PS4 / Xbox One); Lightning Returns: Final Fantasy XIII (PS3 / Xbox 360); Murdered: Soul Suspect (PC / PS3 / Xbox 360); Thief (PC / PS3 / PS4 / Xbox 360 / Xbox One); Tecmo Koei: Dynasty Warriors 8 (PS3 / Xbox 360); Yaiba: Ninja Gaiden Z (iOS / PS3 / Xbox 360); Ubisoft: Assassin's Creed IV: Black Flag (PC / PS3 / PS4 / Wii U / Xbox 360 / Xbox One); The Crew (PC / PS4 / Xbox One); Just Dance 2014 (PS3 / PS4 / Wii / Wii U / Kinect with Xbox 360 / Xbox One); Rayman Legends (PS3 / PS Vita / Wii U / Xbox 360); South Park: The Stick of Truth (PC / PS3 / Xbox 360); Tom Clancy's The Division (PS4 / Xbox One); Tom Clancy's Splinter Cell: Blacklist (PC / PS3 / Wii U / Xbox 360); Trials Fusion (PC / PS4 / Xbox 360 / Xbox One); Trials Frontier (Mobile); Watch Dogs (PC / PS3 / PS4 / Wii U / Xbox 360 / Xbox One); Warner Brothers: Batman: Arkham Origins (PC / PS3 / Wii U / Xbox 360); Dying Light (PC / PS3 / PS4 / Xbox 360 / Xbox One); Lego Marvel Super Heroes (3DS / DS / PC / PS3 / PS Vita / Wii U / Xbox 360); Mad Max (PC / PS3 / PS4 / Xbox 360 / Xbox One); Scribblenauts Unmasked: A DC Comics Adventure (3DS / PC / Wii U); Transistor (PC / PS4); The Witcher 3: Wild Hunt (PC / PS4 / Xbox One); XSEED Games: Killer is Dead (PS3 / Xbox 360); Rune Factory 4 (3DS); Valhalla Knights 3 (PS Vita); Ys: Foliage Ocean in Celceta (PS Vita)
