= List of Ubisoft subsidiaries =

Ubisoft is a French video game publisher headquartered in Montreuil, founded in March 1986 by the Guillemot brothers. Since its establishment, Ubisoft has become one of the largest video game publishers, and it has the largest in-house development team, with more than 20,000 employees working in over 45 studios as of May 2021.

While Ubisoft set up many in-house studios itself, such as Ubisoft Paris, Ubisoft Montpellier, Ubisoft Montreal, and Ubisoft Toronto, the company also acquired several studios, such as Massive Entertainment, Red Storm Entertainment, Reflections Interactive, and FreeStyleGames. Ubisoft's studios often cooperate with each other in their projects, sharing different development duties. Assassin's Creed Unity, released in 2014, saw ten studios worldwide work together.

Since 2026, Ubisoft operates its studios under its Creative Houses divisions, which house multiple studios working on a set of the company's gaming brands.

== Vantage Studios ==
Vantage Studios is a subsidiary of Ubisoft dedicated to the Assassin's Creed, Far Cry and Tom Clancy's Rainbow Six series. It consists of the main development teams of the three series and is intended to be the first "creative house" in Ubisoft's restructuring.

=== Ubisoft Barcelona ===
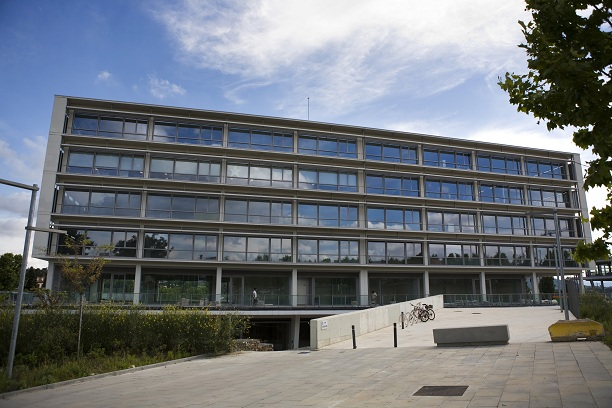
Ubisoft Barcelona building

Ubisoft Barcelona was founded in 1998 and is based in Barcelona, Spain. The team's early focus laid on racing games, until their focus shifted to develop casual games such as Your Shape for Wii. The Barcelona studio also served as a support studio, working on titles such as Tom Clancy's Rainbow Six Siege and Rayman Raving Rabbids. The studio also worked with Red Storm Entertainment on Star Trek: Bridge Crew.

=== Ubisoft Montreal ===
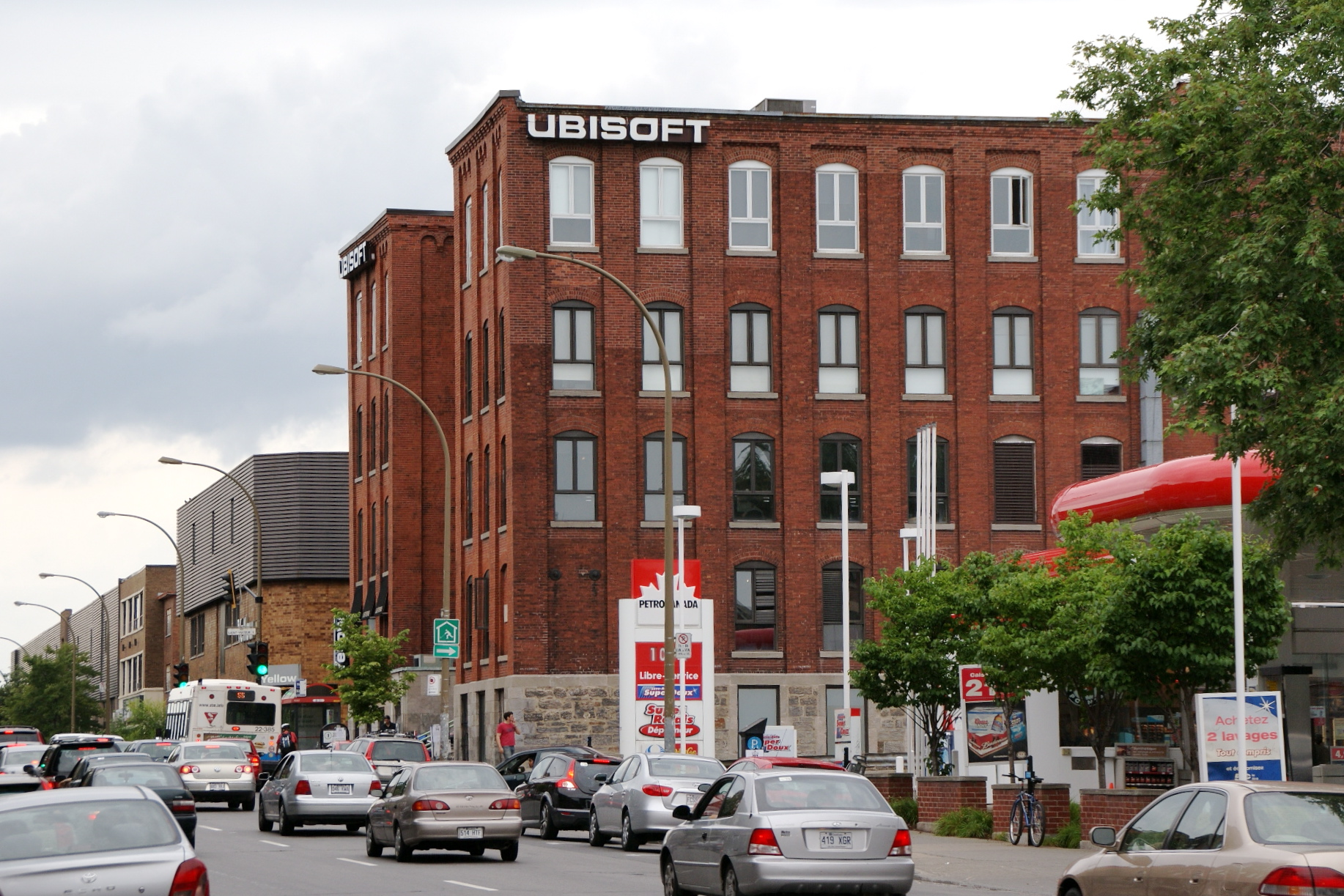
Ubisoft Montreal building

Ubisoft Montreal is Ubisoft's largest in-house development studio, as well as the largest development studio worldwide with more than 4,000 employees. Founded in 1997 in Montreal, Quebec, the studio started with only 50 employees. 25 of these came from Ubisoft's headquarters in France, while the rest were new recruits. Yannis Mallat is the company's studio head. While the company originally focused their work on licensed family-friendly titles, the team achieved breakthrough success through the release of two new titles: Prince of Persia: The Sands of Time and Tom Clancy's Splinter Cell.

Following this success, they shifted their focus onto developing AAA titles. The company developed Far Cry 2 and the subsequent Far Cry sequels, became involved in the Tom Clancy's Rainbow Six series since Vegas and has become the lead developer of Ubisoft's most successful franchise, Assassin's Creed, since the franchise's inception. The studio was also involved in creating new intellectual properties, such as For Honor, Watch Dogs, and Hyper Scape. Ubisoft Montreal has more than 4,000 employees as of May 2021.

=== Ubisoft Quebec ===
Ubisoft Quebec was founded by Ubisoft in 2005 in Quebec City, Quebec. The studio was set out to provide assistance to Ubisoft's main studios, and it also participated in the development of downloadable content for the Assassin's Creed series, such as Tyranny of King Washington for Assassin's Creed III, and Freedom Cry for Assassin's Creed IV: Black Flag. On 3 November 2010, Ubisoft announced that it had acquired Longtail Studios Quebec, a studio of New York City-based Longtail Studios, itself founded in 2003 by Ubisoft co-founder Gérard Guillemot. As a result, 48 of the studio's staff were moved to Ubisoft's existing Ubisoft Quebec operations. The division's director, Andreas Mollman, resigned, and 5–6 employees were laid off.

The Quebec studio worked on Marvel Avengers: Battle for Earth, a Kinect title released in 2012, and became the lead developer for Assassin's Creed Syndicate in 2015, replacing the Montreal studio. It would be the first time the Quebec studio changed its role from a support studio to a lead developer of a AAA game. The studio has more than 500 employees. The company also served as the lead developer for Assassin's Creed Odyssey (2018), Immortals Fenyx Rising (2020), and Assassin's Creed Shadows (2025). Ubisoft Quebec has more than 500 employees as of May 2021.

=== Ubisoft Saguenay ===
Ubisoft Saguenay, in Chicoutimi, Quebec, was announced in September 2017 and opened in February 2018 with 20 employees led by Jimmy Boulianne. The studio will be used to support online and connectivity components for Ubisoft's games. Ubisoft Saguenay has 75 employees as of May 2021.

=== Ubisoft Sherbrooke ===
Ubisoft Sherbrooke was founded in November 2021 in Sherbrooke, Quebec. The studio will co-develop Ubisoft's main franchises. In September 2022, it was announced that Ubisoft Sherbrooke will co-develop new installments of the Assassin's Creed franchise.

=== Ubisoft Sofia ===
Ubisoft Sofia was founded in 2006 in Sofia, Bulgaria. The studio works as a co-development studio and has led the development of Assassin's Creed III: Liberation and Assassin's Creed Rogue. They developed two games in the Chessmaster series: Chessmaster: The Art of Learning (DS, PSP) and Chessmaster Live.

== Massive Entertainment ==
Massive Entertainment, named after the studio, is a creative house structure of Ubisoft dedicated to deliver competitive and co-op shooters Tom Clancy's Ghost Recon, Tom Clancy's The Division and Tom Clancy's Splinter Cell series. It consists of the main development teams of the three series

=== Ubisoft Paris ===
Ubisoft Paris was founded in 1992 in Montreuil, France, and was the first in-house studio for Ubisoft. Ubisoft Paris worked on several early Rayman games as well as one of its spin-offs, Rayman Raving Rabbids 2. It became the core developer of the Tom Clancy's Ghost Recon series and the Just Dance series, one of the most successful rhythm games in the market. The studio's latest work was Mario + Rabbids Sparks of Hope. The studio was assigned to work on Wild on the PlayStation 5 for Sony Interactive Entertainment in place of Michel Ancel's Wild Sheep Studio, but development was stalled due to internal conflicts and unsatisfactory performance. Ubisoft Paris has more than 700 employees as of May 2021.

=== Massive Entertainment ===
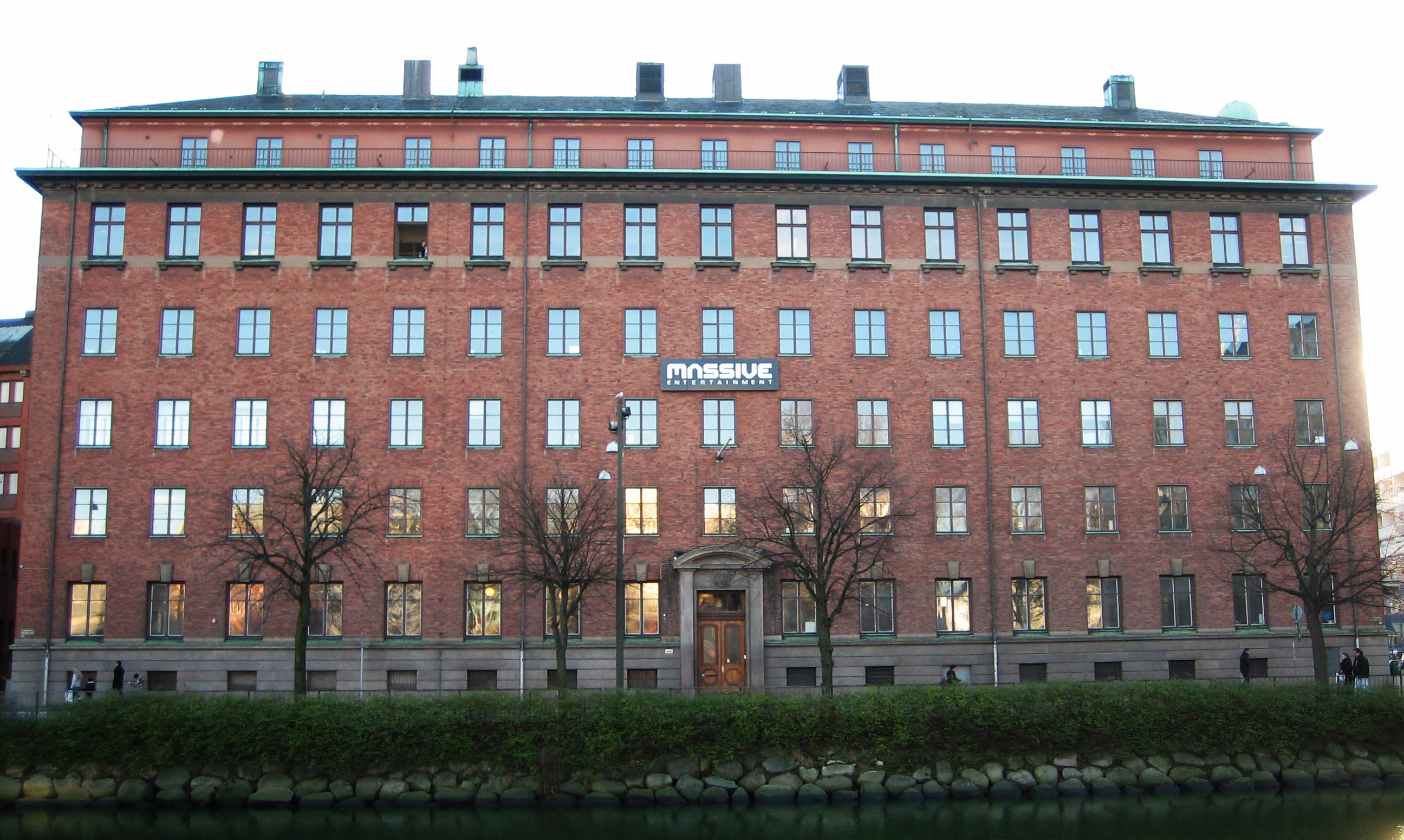
Massive Entertainment building

Massive Entertainment was founded in 1997 in Ronneby, Sweden. Formerly a subsidiary of Vivendi Universal Games, Massive has placed most of its focus on developing real-time strategy games like Ground Control and World in Conflict. It was acquired by Ubisoft in March 2008. Following the acquisition, Massive Entertainment worked on Uplay, Ubisoft's digital distribution platform, and developed Just Dance Now. The company also developed the Snowdrop engine, and used it in Tom Clancy's The Division and its sequel, The Division 2, as well as developing video games based on the Avatar film series, which ended up being Avatar: Frontiers of Pandora and Star Wars franchise; which ended up being Star Wars Outlaws.

=== Ubisoft Toronto ===
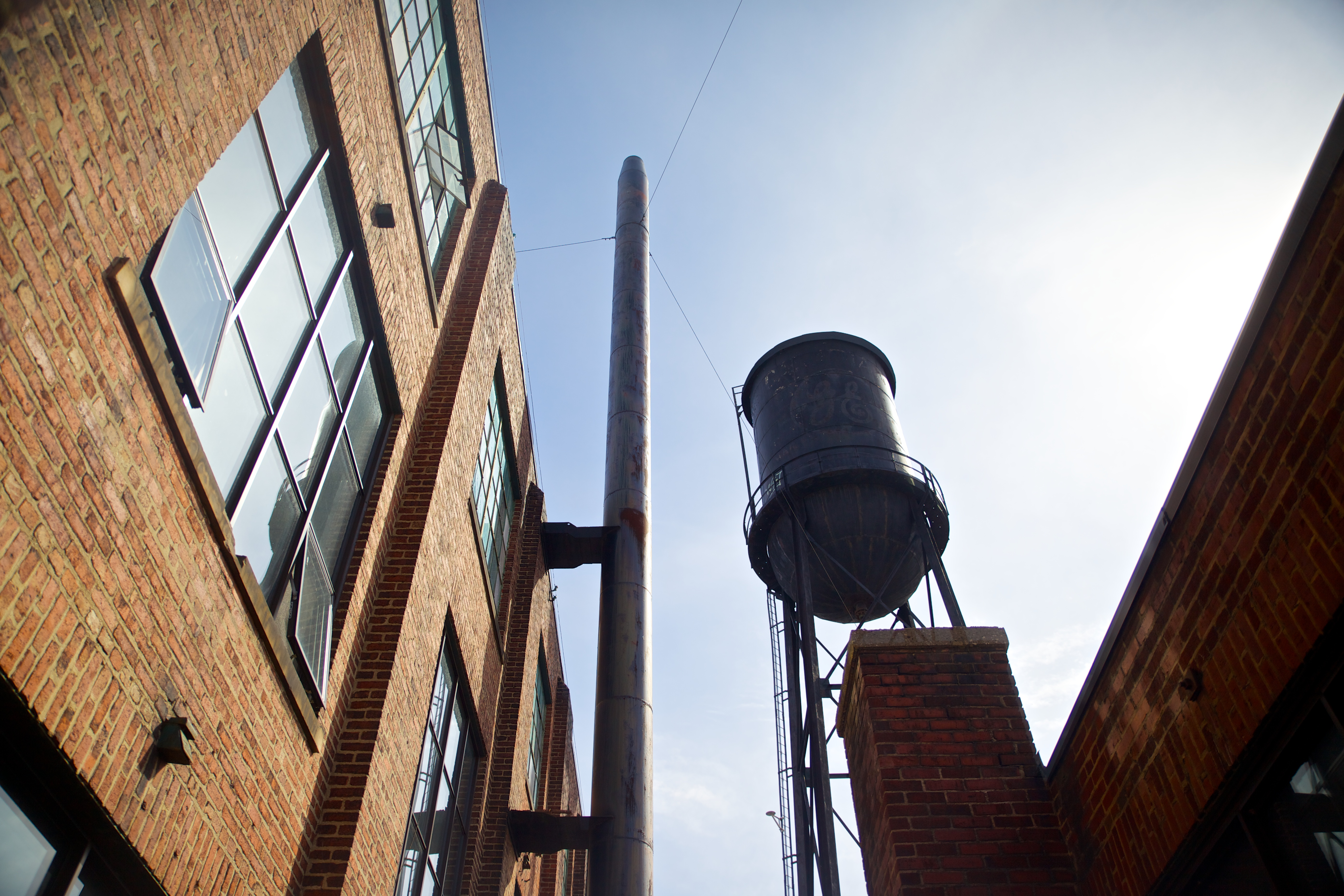
Ubisoft Toronto building

Ubisoft Toronto was founded by Ubisoft in May 2010 in Toronto, Ontario. The studio opening can be credited to the success of the Montreal studio, which encouraged Ubisoft to continue its expansion in Canada. The team at Toronto are mostly employees from the Montreal studio who had worked on Tom Clancy's Splinter Cell: Conviction. The studio then took the lead role in developing Tom Clancy's Splinter Cell game, as the then studio head Jade Raymond thought that it is Ubisoft's most iconic franchise and can help the studio to expand and recruit. Their debut game, Tom Clancy's Splinter Cell: Blacklist, received critical acclaim upon release.

The studio continued to contribute to other Ubisoft's project, including Far Cry 4 and Assassin's Creed Unity. Raymond departed the studio and formed Motive Studios in 2015. Clint Hocking, the director of Far Cry 2, worked in the Toronto studio. The studio also served as the lead developer for Starlink: Battle for Atlas, a toys-to-life game, and Watch Dogs: Legion, which was directed by Hocking. It also replaced the Montreal studio as the lead developer for Far Cry 6.

== Creative House 3 ==
Creative House 3 is a structure of Ubisoft dedicated to make "select, sharp Live experiences" such as Brawlhalla, For Honor, Riders Republic, Skull and Bones and The Crew. It consists of the main development teams supporting those games and developing future experiences

=== Blue Mammoth Games ===
Blue Mammoth Games, based in Atlanta, Georgia, was founded by Lincoln Hamilton and Matt Woomer in 2009. In October 2012, Xaviant, another Atlanta-based developer, acquired a 50% stake in the company. In November 2017, Blue Mammoth announced that a new studio, located in Amsterdam, Netherlands, would be opened to hire 25 people. The studio was opened in January 2018. Blue Mammoth was acquired by Ubisoft on 1 March 2018. The company's primary product is Brawlhalla.

=== Ubisoft Ivory Tower ===
Ubisoft Ivory Tower was founded in Lyon, France, in September 2007 by Ahmed Boukhelifa, Stéphane Beley and Emmanuel Oualid. All three founders were previously employed by Eden Games. Ubisoft Ivory Tower's first game, The Crew, was announced through Ubisoft, acting as its publisher, in June 2013, and released for Microsoft Windows, PlayStation 4, Xbox 360 and Xbox One in December 2014. On 5 October 2015, as The Crew reached 3 million players, Ubisoft announced that they had acquired Ivory Tower for an undisclosed sum. At the time, the studio housed 100 employees. Ivory Tower's second game, The Crew 2, was announced by Ubisoft in June 2017, and released for Microsoft Windows, PlayStation 4, Xbox One in June 2018.

== Creative House 4 ==
Creative House 4 is a structure of Ubisoft dedicated to focus on immersive fantasy worlds and "narrative-driven universes" such as Anno, Beyond Good and Evil, Might and Magic, Prince of Persia and Rayman series. It consists of the main development teams of those series.

=== Ubisoft Mainz ===
Ubisoft Mainz was established as Related Designs by Thomas Pottkämper, Burkhard Ratheiser, Thomas Stein, and Jens Vielhaben in 1995, then based in Pottkämper's parents' house in Mainz' Nackenheim district. On 11 April 2007, Ubisoft acquired a 30% stake in Related Designs, alongside the rights to the Related Designs-developed Anno series. In May 2008, they had 50 employees. On 11 April 2013, Ubisoft acquired the remaining 70% and took total control over Related Designs. From that point on, the company would develop projects in tandem with another German Ubisoft studio, Blue Byte. Related Designs was assigned the Blue Byte name in June 2014. The studio was rebranded Ubisoft Mainz in August 2019. The studio has 170 employees as of January 2023.

=== Ubisoft Milan ===
Ubisoft Milan was founded in 1998 in Milan, Italy. The studio's initial focus was to develop handheld titles, and it brought Rayman to Game Boy Color and Lara Croft Tomb Raider: The Prophecy to Game Boy Advance. The Milan studio also served as a support studio for Ubisoft, assisting other studios on many games, such as Beyond Good & Evil, Tom Clancy's Rainbow Six: Rogue Spear, Tom Clancy's Rainbow Six 3: Athena Sword, Tom Clancy's Splinter Cell: Pandora Tomorrow, Tom Clancy's Splinter Cell: Chaos Theory, Tom Clancy's Splinter Cell: Double Agent, Assassin's Creed III: Liberation, Assassin's Creed Rogue, Assassin's Creed IV: Black Flag, and Tom Clancy's Ghost Recon Wildlands, and is a core developer of the Just Dance series. The studio's focus then shifted to develop games that require motion control, including MotionSports (with the Barcelona studio), We Dare, and Raving Rabbids: Alive and Kicking (with the Paris studio). The studio was the lead developer of the company's first Nintendo Switch exclusive game, Mario + Rabbids Kingdom Battle, together with Ubisoft Paris; it also developed Donkey Kong Adventure, the downloadable content for that game, and the sequel Mario + Rabbids Sparks of Hope.

=== Ubisoft Montpellier ===
Ubisoft Montpellier, formerly Ubi Pictures, was founded in 1994 as one of Ubisoft's graphics departments in Castelnau-le-Lez, France. The studio has released several successful games under Michel Ancel's direction, including Rayman and Beyond Good & Evil. The company also worked on several licensed titles, including The Adventures of Tintin: The Secret of the Unicorn and Peter Jackson's King Kong, and collaborated with Eric Chahi on From Dust. The studio also developed the UbiArt Framework engine, used in titles like Rayman Origins, Rayman Legends and Valiant Hearts: The Great War. The company released Prince of Persia: The Lost Crown in 2024 and is currently working on Beyond Good and Evil 2.

=== Ubisoft Nadeo ===
Ubisoft Nadeo was founded in 2000 in Paris, France, by Florent Castelnérac. Ubisoft announced the acquisition of Nadeo on 5 October 2009. Anne Blondel-Jouin served as the company's publishing director between 2011 and 2013. and gained success with the racing game franchise TrackMania. The team focused on allowing players to create user-generated content and developed a network called ManiaPlanet. All games developed by Ubisoft Nadeo since Ubisoft's acquisition in 2009 were racing games, except for ShootMania Storm, a first-person shooter. Ubisoft Nadeo's latest title is Trackmania, the free-to-play remake of TrackMania Nations.

== Creative House 5 ==
Creative House 5 is a structure of Ubisoft dedicated to focus on family-friendly and casual games such as Just Dance, Uno, Hungry Shark, Invincible: Guarding The Globe, Hasbro-licensed games, etc. It consists of the main development teams of those series.

=== Ubisoft Abu Dhabi ===
Ubisoft Abu Dhabi was founded in 2011 in Abu Dhabi, United Arab Emirates, with the goal of fostering the video game industry in the country. The studio focuses on working on mobile titles, such as the CSI series, and maintain Growtopia, a game Ubisoft acquired in 2017. Ubisoft Abu Dhabi has more than 60 employees as of May 2021.

==== Ubisoft Barcelona Mobile ====
Ubisoft Barcelona Mobile, based in Barcelona, Spain, was formed as Microjocs Mobile in 2002, and became part of Digital Chocolate in August 2007. The studio was sold to Ubisoft in September 2013 and subsequently renamed Ubisoft Barcelona Mobile. Productions by Ubisoft Barcelona Mobile include Galaxy Life and Might & Magic: Elemental Guardians. Ubisoft Barcelona Mobile has more than 70 employees as of May 2021.

=== Ketchapp ===
Ketchapp was founded in 2014 in Paris, France, by brothers Michel and Antoine Morcos, specialising in publishing games for the mobile games market. The company was acquired by Ubisoft in 2016.

=== Kolibri Games ===
Kolibri Games, founded in 2016 in Berlin, Germany, is a developer of idle games genre and publishes Idle Miner Tycoon and Idle Factory Tycoon. Ubisoft acquired 75% of the studio in 2020. Kolibri Games has 130 employees as of May 2021.

==== Ubisoft Paris Mobile ====
Ubisoft Paris Mobile was created in 2013 and is co-located with Ubisoft Paris in Montreuil, France. The studio worked on the mobile game Assassin's Creed: Pirates.

== Creative Network ==
Studios providing the Creative Houses with support in different capacities of development including providing technical support, QA, and other development resources.

=== Ubisoft Annecy ===
Ubisoft Annecy was established in 1996 in Annecy, France, and their first game was Rayman Revolution for PlayStation 2. Annecy developed the multiplayer portion of many Ubisoft games, including the Tom Clancy's Splinter Cell series and the Assassin's Creed series. Their first title as a lead developer was Steep, an open world winter sports game released in late 2016. The studio was previously known as Ubisoft Simulations. The studio also collaborated with Massive Entertainment and worked on Tom Clancy's The Division 2. The studio's latest game is Riders Republic, which was released on 28 October 2021.

==== Ubisoft Berlin ====
Ubisoft Berlin was opened in early 2018 in Berlin, Germany, with a focus on co-development. The company will develop on games in the Far Cry franchise. In 2020, it was confirmed that the company is also working on Skull & Bones. The studio has 140 employees as of January 2023.

=== Ubisoft Bordeaux ===
Ubisoft Bordeaux was founded in September 2017 in Bordeaux, France. It serves as a support studio and collaborates with the Annecy, Paris and Montpellier studios on their future titles. The studio is headed by Julien Mayeux. Ubisoft Bordeaux has more than 300 employees as of May 2021. It served as the lead developer for Assassin's Creed Mirage (2023), with Stéphane Boudon as the game's creative director.

=== Ubisoft Chengdu ===
Ubisoft Chengdu was founded in 2008 in Chengdu, as Ubisoft's second studio in China. The studio also served as a support studio, working on games such as Scott Pilgrim vs. the World: The Game, and provided Chinese localisation services for games like Might & Magic: Duel of Champions. Ubisoft Chengdu led the development of Monkey King Escape, a mobile title, and casual games Scrabble (2013), Uno (2017) and Wheel of Fortune. Ubisoft Chengdu has more than 420 employees as of May 2021.

=== Ubisoft Da Nang ===
Ubisoft Da Nang was established in September 2019 in Da Nang, Vietnam. It will help develop mobile games and "Instant Games" for other platforms like Facebook, with plans to hire 100 developers in three years. They led the development of PC and console ports of Valiant Hearts: Coming Home, the Apple Arcade title Rabbids: Legends of the Multiverse as well as numerous browser games based on Ubisoft's franchises.

=== Ubisoft Blue Byte ===
Ubisoft Blue Byte was founded in Düsseldorf, Germany, in 1988. The company found early success with strategy titles, such as The Settlers and Battle Isle. Blue Byte was acquired by Ubisoft in 2001. Ubisoft Blue Byte's main Düsseldorf studio, Ubisoft Düsseldorf, has 470 employees as of January 2023, making it the largest in Germany.

=== Ubisoft Kyiv ===
Ubisoft Kyiv was founded in 2008 in Kyiv, Ukraine, originally as Ubisoft Kiev. The studio's focus is to port Ubisoft games to personal computers (PCs), and the studio has also worked on titles such as Tom Clancy's Ghost Recon: Future Soldier, Tom Clancy's Ghost Recon Frontline (which was not finished), and Watch Dogs 2. Ubisoft Kyiv partnered with Massive Entertainment on Uplay and frequently worked with RedLynx on Trials games. In 2016, the studio launched a quality control department for PC ports. Recently, Ubisoft Kyiv has worked closely with Ubisoft Quebec on Assassin's Creed Odyssey's PC version, and with RedLynx on Trials Rising. In December 2019, Ubisoft Kiev was rebranded as Ubisoft Kyiv to adopt the Ukrainian spelling of the city's name.

In January 2026, the parent company Ubisoft announced a sweeping global restructuring, splitting its worldwide studios into five autonomous divisions known as "Creative Houses". The Ukrainian cluster, consisting of Ubisoft Kyiv and Ubisoft Odesa with a combined workforce of over 800 specialists, was integrated into the technological division called "Creative House — Core Engine & Tech". Despite the closure of several other North American and European branches during the 2026 consolidation (including studios in Winnipeg and Halifax), corporate management confirmed that the Ukrainian offices would maintain full operations. The Kyiv studio continued its active co-development of flagship franchises, contributing to the launch of the PC version for Assassin's Creed Black Flag Resynced in July 2026.

=== Ubisoft Odesa ===
Ubisoft Odesa was founded in Odesa, Ukraine, in March 2018. As the second studio in Ukraine, it will work alongside Ubisoft Kyiv on games such as the Tom Clancy's Ghost Recon series and Trials Rising.

=== Ubisoft Pune ===
Ubisoft Pune in Pune, India, was originally part of Gameloft, a mobile game developer and publisher, until Ubisoft acquired it in 2008, at which point it had 35 members. The studio then worked on several Just Dance titles, mobile titles, ported to other console such as Nintendo Switch, and provided quality assurance tests for many Ubisoft games. The studio was working on the remake for Prince of Persia: The Sands of Time. Ubisoft Pune has more than 1,200 employees as of May 2021.

=== Red Storm Entertainment ===
Red Storm Entertainment was founded by novelist Tom Clancy, managing director Steve Reid, and 17 staff members in Cary, North Carolina, in 1996. The company self-published its first tactical shooter, Tom Clancy's Rainbow Six, in 1998. Ubisoft acquired the studio in 2000. After the acquisition, Red Storm continued to work on tactical shooters in the Tom Clancy's franchise and developed Tom Clancy's Ghost Recon in 2001, as well as its sequel, Tom Clancy's Ghost Recon 2, in 2004. Red Storm continues to collaborate with other Ubisoft studios on future Ghost Recon titles and was involved in the development of several Far Cry games. In 2008, Ubisoft acquired the rights to Clancy's name for video games. Red Storm became one of the first Ubisoft studios to develop virtual reality projects, starting with the release of Werewolves Within in 2016 and Star Trek: Bridge Crew in 2017.

=== Ubisoft Reflections ===
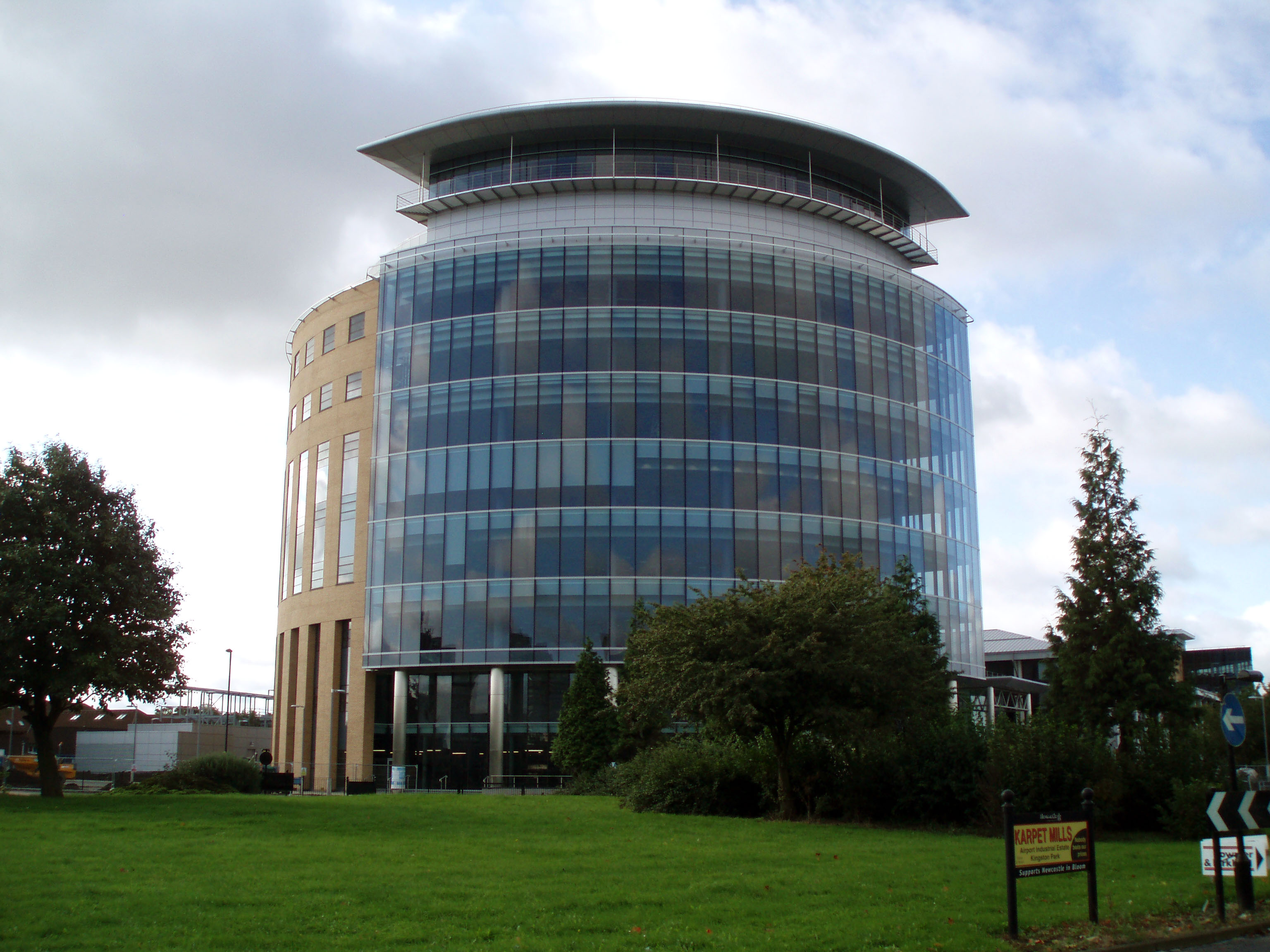
Ubisoft Reflections building

Ubisoft Reflections was founded in 1984 in Newcastle upon Tyne, England. The company has developed several successful franchises, including Destruction Derby and Driver before Ubisoft's acquisition in July 2006. After Reflections' acquisition, the company continued to work on new Driver titles, with the latest being 2011's Driver: San Francisco. The studio then turned to become a support team to work on other titles such as Tom Clancy's The Division, worked on vehicle physics for other Ubisoft games, and experimented with smaller projects such as Grow Home. The studio is managed by Lisa Opie. Ubisoft Reflections worked closely with Ubisoft Leamington and has more than 250 employees as of May 2021.

=== Ubisoft Bucharest ===
Ubisoft Bucharest in Bucharest, Romania, was founded by six members in 1992 as Ubisoft's first in-house studio that was based outside France. They developed games in the Chessmaster, Silent Hunter, and H.A.W.X series. It also supported other studios on the development of Assassin's Creed's multiplayer, Assassin's Creed Rogue, Just Dance, and Tom Clancy's Ghost Recon: Future Soldier. A separate team in Craiova was established in September 2008 with 12 employees. In December 2008, 126 employees were added to the two studios (75 in Bucharest and 51 in Craiova), with the total staff count reaching around 770.

=== Ubisoft Shanghai ===
Ubisoft Shanghai was founded in 1996 in Shanghai, and has become one of China's largest development studios. The studio has worked as the support team for many of Ubisoft's projects, such as the Far Cry and Just Dance franchises, working on wildlife animation and artificial intelligence.

=== Ubisoft Singapore ===
Ubisoft Singapore was formed in 2008 as Ubisoft's first in-house studio in South-East Asia, located on the Fusionopolis complex in Singapore. Having served as a support studio, working on games such as Prince of Persia: The Forgotten Sands and Assassin's Creed II, the company worked on the naval combat of Assassin's Creed III before significantly expanding it with Assassin's Creed IV: Black Flag and Assassin's Creed Rogue. The company is also responsible for making the AAA multiplayer online shooting game Tom Clancy's Ghost Recon Phantoms, released in 2014 and closed in December 2016. After the closure of Ghost Recon Phantoms, the studio's creative director, Justin Farren, came to Ubisoft's E3 2017 press conference to announce their new IP named Skull & Bones, the development of which it would lead. The game released in February 2024, following multiple delays, to mixed reviews. Ubisoft Singapore has 500 employees as of May 2021.

== Europe ==
=== 1492 Studio ===
1492 Studio was founded in Vailhauquès, France, in 2014 by Claire and Thibaud Zamora, and acquired by Ubisoft in February 2018. The studio developed Is it Love?, a free-to-play episodic mobile game.

=== Green Panda Games ===
Ubisoft acquired a 70% stake in Green Panda Games in July 2019, with an option to fully acquire the company. Green Panda Games, founded in 2013 and based in Paris, is a developer and publisher of over 50 mobile casual games. Green Panda Games has 120 employees as of May 2021.

=== i3D.net ===
It was announced in November 2018 that Ubisoft would be acquiring Dutch server hosting company i3D.net. The acquisition closed before the end of the 2018-19 fiscal year.

=== Owlient ===
Owlient is a video game studio founded in 2005 in Paris, France. The company focuses on creating free-to-play titles, with their most successful game being Howrse. Owlient was acquired by Ubisoft in 2011.

=== Ubisoft CRC (EMEA) ===
Ubisoft Consumer Relationship Center manages Customer Support and Community Management for Europe, Middle East & Asian territories and is located in Newcastle upon Tyne, England.

=== Ubisoft Stockholm ===
Ubisoft Stockholm was founded in 2017 in Stockholm, Sweden. Led by Patrick Bach, the studio collaborated with Massive Entertainment on Avatar: Frontiers of Pandora.

== North America ==
=== Hybride Technologies ===
Hybride Technologies in Piedmont, Quebec, is a technology company founded in 1991. Its main role is to create visual effects for films and TV shows, and had contributed to films such as Jurassic World, Star Wars: The Force Awakens and Solo: A Star Wars Story. The company was acquired by Ubisoft in 2008. The company has a second office co-located with Ubisoft Montreal in Montreal, Quebec, which was opened in February 2016.

=== Quazal ===
Quazal, based in Montreal, Quebec, is a software developer. Founded in 1998 by Sylvain Beaudry, Martin Lavoie and Carl Dionne, the company focuses on the development of cross-platform multiplayer tools for video games, most notably, Net-Z and Rendez-Vous. On 4 November 2010, it was announced that Ubisoft had acquired Quazal.

=== Ubisoft CRC (NCSA) ===
Ubisoft Consumer Relationship Center manages Customer Support and Community Management for North, Central & South American territories and is located in Cary, North Carolina, sharing office space with Red Storm Entertainment.

== Asia ==
=== Ubisoft Mumbai ===
Ubisoft Mumbai was established in Mumbai in June 2018, and is the second studio in India after Ubisoft Pune. It will work alongside Ubisoft Pune as well as collaborate with local universities.

=== Ubisoft Philippines ===
Ubisoft Philippines was founded in 2016 as the first major game studio in the Philippines. The studio was located on the campus of De La Salle University in Santa Rosa, Laguna, and develops new AAA games alongside Ubisoft Singapore. In June 2024, Ubisoft Philippines relocated to BGC, Taguig City. Ubisoft Philippines has 120 employees as of June 2024.

== Former ==
=== Sunflowers Interactive ===
Sunflowers Interactive Entertainment Software GmbH was founded in 1993 by Adi Boiko and Wilhelm Hamrozi, and was based in Heusenstamm, Germany. The company was best known for creating and publishing the Anno series of real-time strategy games. In December 2001, Sunflowers Interactive struck a four-year exclusivity deal with Bulgarian developer Black Sea Studios, which resulted in Knights of Honor (2004). In March 2002, the company dismantled their entire internal development studio, shifting their focus onto third-party publishing. To do so, they acquired a 30% stake in Berlin-based studio Spieleentwicklungskombinat. Sunflowers Interactive furthermore signed a contract with Aspyr in August 2006, which gained them wider distribution of their games in North America. Ubisoft announced on 11 April 2007 that they had acquired Sunflowers Interactive and the Anno series, of which the company would be merged into Ubisoft's own distribution arm. Co-founder Boiko stated that he was satisfied with the acquisition, knowing that Ubisoft and Related Designs would be creating "something amazing". However, both Boiko and Hamrozi stated that they did not want to work for Ubisoft, and planned to establish a new venture instead.

=== Ubisoft Belgrade ===
Founded in November 2016, Ubisoft Belgrade in Belgrade, Serbia, has worked on Tom Clancy's Ghost Recon Wildlands, Tom Clancy's Ghost Recon Breakpoint, Steep: Road to the Olympics and The Crew 2. The studio has developed post-launch content for Wildlands and Breakpoint. The studio was closed on June 10, 2026, and all of its employees were laid off.

=== Ubisoft Casablanca ===
Ubisoft Casablanca was opened in April 1998 in Casablanca, Morocco. The studio's first production was the version of Donald Duck: Goin' Quackers that was released for PC, Dreamcast and Nintendo 64. Ubisoft Casablanca assisted the development of various games for portable platforms. In June 2007, Ubisoft stated that they were to expand the studio by 150 people using government incentives. Between 2008 and 2010, the studio also operated a campus that sought to train 300 game development graduates. Ubisoft Casablanca was shuttered on 13 June 2016, following a shift in the marketplace, and the studio's position not being compatible with Ubisoft's plans going forward. The studio previously employed 48 staff members and was the oldest video game studio in North Africa. Companies set up by former Ubisoft Casablanca employees include developers TheWallGames founded by Yassine Arif, Rym Games by Imad Kharijah and Othman El Bahraoui, and Palm Grove Software by Khalil Arafan, as well as the collective Moroccan Game Developers founded in 2011 by Arif and Osama Hussain to promote video game development in Morocco.

=== Ubisoft Halifax ===
Ubisoft Halifax (formerly Longtail Studios Halifax) is based in Halifax, Nova Scotia, and best known for co-developing the Rocksmith series. The company was founded in 2009 as a studio of New York City-based Longtail Studios, itself founded in 2003 by Ubisoft co-founder Gérard Guillemot. In July 2009, Longtail Studios offered the 23 employees at its Charlottetown, Prince Edward Island (PEI), studio the ability to relocate to their new Halifax studio. The move was met by PEI's Minister of Innovation, Allan Campbell, offering Longtail Studios subsidies and tax breaks to retain the jobs in PEI.

In August 2013, Longtail Studios Halifax joined the Entertainment Software Association of Canada. At this time, the studio had 45 employees. On 13 October 2015, Ubisoft acquired Longtail Studios Halifax, then covering over 30 employees, wherein the company was renamed Ubisoft Halifax. Another 10 positions were immediately opened for hiring. Through the acquisition, Ubisoft planned to expand its mobile game business in Canada. Ubisoft Halifax had more than 70 employees as of May 2021. In December 2025, approximately 60 workers at Ubisoft Halifax voted to unionize with CWA Canada, forming the first union of Ubisoft workers in North America. On January 7, 2026, it was announced that Ubisoft was closing the studio, affecting 70 people; Ubisoft claimed that the decision to close the studio was made prior to their unionization.

=== Ubisoft Leamington ===
Ubisoft Leamington, formerly FreeStyleGames, was founded in Leamington Spa, England, in 2002 by six industry veterans formerly of Codemasters and Rare. The studio worked on popular music games such as DJ Hero and Sing Party while it was owned by Activision. After the commercial failure of Guitar Hero Live, Activision sold the studio to Ubisoft, which directed the studio to work with Ubisoft Reflections. Ubisoft Leamington works closely with Ubisoft Reflections and has more than 100 employees as of May 2021.

On January 27, 2025, it was announced that Ubisoft was closing the studio, affecting 50 people.

=== Ubisoft London ===
Ubisoft London (formerly known as Future Games of London, then later known as Ubisoft Future Games of London) was founded in 2009 in London, England. The studio released Hungry Shark before Ubisoft's acquisition in October 2013. It continued to work on new entries in the Hungry Shark series throughout the following years.

On September 14, 2023, it was announced that Ubisoft would close the studio, impacting 54 positions. Development and management of the Hungry Shark series was transferred to Ubisoft Barcelona Mobile.

=== Ubisoft Osaka ===
Ubisoft Osaka, formerly known as Digital Kids, was founded in Osaka, Japan. It was acquired by Ubisoft in 2008, and created many handheld titles, including Petz. The studio collaborated with Ubisoft San Francisco.

On December 3, 2024, it was announced that Ubisoft was closing the studio, affecting 134 people.

=== Ubisoft San Francisco ===
Ubisoft San Francisco was based in San Francisco, California. It was founded in 2009 within Ubisoft's North American headquarters and was the lead developer for the Rocksmith series, a music video game that allows players to use a real guitar as a controller, which was released in 2011. The game was a critical and commercial success, and was followed by multiple sequels. The studio recruited a large number of new employees in the mid-2010s, and collaborated with Matt Stone and Trey Parker in 2014 to develop South Park: The Fractured but Whole, a role-playing game based on the animated television series South Park universe. The game was released in 2017 to critical acclaim. In 2021, it announced the first-person shooter XDefiant. Ubisoft San Francisco also provided support for several other Ubisoft titles, including games from Assassin's Creed and Far Cry series. On December 3, 2024, Ubisoft announced the studio's closure, laying off 143 people. XDefiant was also announced to be shutting down after not attracting or retaining enough players.

=== Ubisoft São Paulo ===
Ubisoft São Paulo was located in São Paulo, Brazil. The studio's foundation was announced on 24 June 2008 with a planned opening with 20 employees set for late July 2008, seeking to employ about 200 total staff after a four-year lifespan. Early on, studio head Bertrand Chaverot stated that Ubisoft was considering to open additional studios in Rio de Janeiro and Florianópolis. On 20 January 2009, it was announced that Ubisoft had acquired Porto Alegre-based Southlogic Studios, which was merged into Ubisoft São Paulo. On 29 September 2010, Ubisoft reported that, due to a declining market interest in Nintendo DS games, the operations in Brazil would be re-evaluated, and that Ubisoft São Paulo's development facilities would be ramped down by the end of the year.

=== Ubisoft Winnipeg ===
On 6 April 2018, Ubisoft announced it would invest CA$35 million in Canada's Manitoba province to create 100 jobs within five years, establishing a studio located in Winnipeg. Darryl Long will serve as the studio's managing director. Ubisoft Winnipeg worked on Ubisoft's open world franchises. On June 10, 2026, it was announced that Ubisoft was closing the studio and laying off dozen of employees.

=== Ubisoft Zurich ===
Ubisoft Zurich began hiring for an unannounced free-to-play game in August 2011. The company was set up by Yann Le Tensorer, who became its managing director, in Thalwil, a suburb of Zürich, Switzerland. In an interview with Swiss magazine 20 Minuten, Le Tensorer explained that Ubisoft Zurich would be developing games with a focus on online gameplay. He also stated that the company was planning to initially hire 20 people, and later expand the studio as the Swiss game development scene grew, as it was the case with Ubisoft Montreal. However, in October 2013, Ubisoft announced that Ubisoft Zurich would be closed by the end of that month, citing the cancellation of the studio's only in-development game as reason for the closure. 16 people were laid off in the process, all of whom were offered positions in other Ubisoft studios.

=== Wolfpack Studios ===
Wolfpack Studios Inc. was founded in Round Rock, Texas, in 1999 by J. Todd Coleman, together with high school friend James Nance and college roommate Josef Hall. Ubisoft announced on 1 March 2004 that they had acquired Wolfpack Studios, which at the time had between 20 and 25 employees, for an undisclosed price. All three founders left the company after the purchase, of which Coleman and Hall later joined KingsIsle Entertainment. On 1 April 2006, Ubisoft announced that the company would be closed down on 15 May 2006. Wolfpack Studios' only product was Shadowbane, which was released in March 2003. Several former members of Wolfpack Studios established a successor, Stray Bullet Games, in the same offices on 1 June 2006.

=== Ubisoft RedLynx ===
Ubisoft RedLynx was founded in 2000 in Helsinki, Finland, by brothers Atte and Antti Ilvessuo and focuses on creating racing games with the Trials series. While the studio was developing Trials Evolution, it was acquired by Ubisoft in November 2011. Following Ubisoft's acquisition, the company continued to work on new Trials instalments with Trials Fusion in 2014, Trials of the Blood Dragon in 2016, and Trials Rising in 2019; outside of the Trials franchise, they also developed South Park: Phone Destroyer. Ubisoft RedLynx has more than 150 employees as of May 2021. In october of 2026, Ubisoft announces the closure of the studio following the restructuring of the company's internal studios.
