= MotoHeroz =

2011 video game

- Title card
- Developer: Ubisoft RedLynx
- Publishers: Ubisoft RedLynx, Ubisoft
- Platforms: Wii (WiiWare), iOS, Android
- Release: Wii; September 15, 2011 iOS; March 15, 2012; Android; September 26, 2013
- Genres: Platform, racing
- Mode: Single-player

MotoHeroz is a platform-racing video game developed and self-published by Ubisoft RedLynx. It was released as a digital download on September 15, 2011 for the Nintendo Wii via its WiiWare service, March 15, 2012 for iOS devices, and September 26, 2013 for Android.

It features both single and multiplayer gameplay. The game also features online leaderboards and challenge levels which are periodically replaced with new ones.

== Gameplay ==
MotoHeroz is played from a 2D perspective, much like a standard platform game. It differs from a standard platform game in that players will often backtrack or travel in both directions as opposed to the standard linear left-to-right progression.

MotoHeroz is a platform racing video game in which the player must guide their vehicle through a colorful environment. Control emphasis is placed on forward and reverse motion and balancing the vehicle. Unlike many a traditional platform game where the player character progresses from left to right, MotoHeroz will often require the player to double back along a previous path which has been altered, or move in a right-to-left reverse direction on a higher platform.

Three gameplay modes are included, Story, Online, and Party. Story mode is played by one player as they progress through the game's main campaign. Online play features new levels, challenges and online leaderboards. Up to four players can join in for simultaneous gameplay for Party mode. Fourteen different vehicles are available, and includes over 100 levels. Bonus levels are often interchanged by the developer. Popular levels stay in play longer while those less popular are replaced by new or previous creations. Each level is roughly 20 kilobytes in size, and approximately 50 were created to be interchanged post-launch. Each level remains online for 12–24 hours and features a score-based challenge system.

== Development, marketing and release ==
MotoHeroz was first announced on September 1, 2010 as an exclusive for the Nintendo Wii. RedLynx would self-publish the game on Nintendo's WiiWare service. It was released for the Wii on September 15, 2011. It was later announced for iOS devices such as the iPhone and iPad via a teaser trailer on March 7, 2012. This version would be published by Ubisoft, who acquired the developer in November 2011. It was released for iOS devices on March 15, 2012, with the iPad version released as MotoHeroz HD.

RedLynx Creative Director Antti Ilvesssuo stated that "From the start [MotoHeroz] had to be designed for Nintendo's audience." An interviewer from Edge magazine stated if they felt whether the game would work on other platforms, or whether RedLynx's previous title Trials HD, would be successful on the Wii. RedLynx Chief Executive Officer Tero Virtala stated that "I strongly believe that at some point there will be multiplatform launches from us, but those games will have to be such that from the start we feel that it's going to be an excellent game for every platform." Ilvesssuo stated in a separate interview that MotoHeroz was not intended to be a "Trials HD copycat", and that the original concept for the game was over five years old at the time. He also re-emphasized the focus on Nintendo's audience, stating "With WiiWare, we saw a great opportunity as it suited this type of game very well". The game runs at 60 frames per second and features music by Alan Wake composer Petri Alanko.

== Reception ==
Reception

Aggregate score
Aggregator	Score	
Aggregator	iOS	Wii
Metacritic	77/100	82/100

Review scores
Publication	Score	
Publication	iOS	Wii
Destructoid	N/A	7/10
Edge	N/A	7/10
Eurogamer	N/A	6/10
GamePro	N/A	4.5/5
GamesMaster	N/A	88%
GameZone	N/A	8.5/10
Hyper	7/10	N/A
IGN	N/A	9/10
NGamer	N/A	80%
Nintendo World Report	N/A	9/10

MotoHeroz received "favorable" reviews on both platforms according to the review aggregation website Metacritic. The Wii version received two perfect scores at Metacritic: from N-Europe's Sam Gittins and Peter Willington of Nintendo Life.

David Sanchez of GameZone praised the game's multiplayer aspects. He also noted that until MotoHeroz was released the only reason he found "to hook up my console [was] to play Super Smash Bros. Brawl with [his] buddies." He listed the five-hour campaign and lack of online multiplayer as low points to his review, but stated that the game was still well worth its cost. IGN's Lucas M. Thomas gave high marks to several aspects of the game. He noted that the game's load times were extremely fast, the menus were intuitive, and that it had several moments of humor. He also noted that though the Wii cannot produce HDTV resolutions that MotoHeroz still looked impressive in the console's 480p resolution. Darren Nakamura of Destructoid raised a concern with the game's gold medal difficulty. He felt that the challenge ranged "from pretty tough to ludicrously difficult." He noted that many critics initially scoffed its price when compared to Trials HD, but stated that most reviewers later recanted their concerns due to large amounts of replay value.

Eurogamer's Rich Stanton was more critical of the game. He felt that even though it represented some of the best WiiWare games had to offer it still did not stand up to RedLynx's other titles. A higher score was given by Nadia Oxford of Gamezebo. Oxford did note that there are moments of repetitive gameplay, but appreciated the inclusion of randomized online ghost racers for the iOS version. Official Nintendo Magazine's Jason Killingsworth stated that MotoHeroz "offers countless hours of physics-based fun, especially in chaotic four-player mode."

== See also ==
- Trials (series)
