= Bike or Die! =

Trial bike game

Bike or Die
- Developer: Toyspring
- Stable release: 2.1b / 2009-03-10
- Operating system: Palm OS iOS
- Website: Bike or Die! official homepage

Bike or Die! is a trial bike game by developer Toyspring, released for Palm OS in mid-2004 and for iOS in 2008. In this game players try to ride a bike with simulated physics over challenging and varied courses, in order to collect flags as quickly as possible. Players can download additional levels and compete online via the game's official homepage.

== Gameplay ==
Gameplay involves using the device's directional keys to control the movement of the biker. The player must guide the biker across the course, through all of the checkpoint flags, if there are any. The level is completed when the biker reaches the finish flag; if there is no finish flag, then the biker only has to pass the checkpoints. The bike used in the game is comically springy, and is quite capable of performing wild acrobatics such as wheelies, flips, or jumps.

In each level, there are usually obstacles and challenging terrain that may cause the biker to crash and fall off the bike. When this happens, the biker becomes injured and the level must be restarted. A player crashes when they either run into mines, which can be randomly or strategically placed in the levels, or when the head or torso of the biker stick character contacts the ground or a wall. The springy nature of the bike means that this may occur if the bike collides with another object with too much force. In the case of high-impact collisions, the bike may even pass through the surface of the level.

Later versions of the game introduced sticky and slippery surfaces, along with portals, adding additional challenges to the game.

== Reception & history ==
Bike or Die was first released on July 12, 2004. While the simplistic stick-figure graphics were noted as being fairly primitive, the game consistently received positive reviews. In particular it was commonly noted for being 'super-addictive', with numerous levels included along with the game, and a broad array of community-contributed level packs also available for download on the game's official homepage. By 2009, the game had been downloaded over 40,000 times from multiple vendors.

The game received consistently positive reviews from customers too, attracting numerous five star reviews at multiple software marketplaces including Handango, PalmGear, MyTreo.net, and PDASsi. The game was also recommended in the fifth edition of "How to do Everything with your Palm".

Bike or Die! received several major updates over time that added new gameplay features, up until early 2007. The 1.4 major update, released in October 2006, included several new features such as the updraft and ghost bike.

== Online content ==
Bike or Die! comes with 25 levels, and additional level packs can be downloaded from the Bike or Die! web site. Players are able to create their own level packs using a separate on-device level editor application called Bike or Design, and player created level packs are also able to be submitted and shared via the Bike or Die! website.

The game's website also allows players to submit their times and recorded replays in order to compete, with both time-trial records and a 'Hall of Fame' displayed online. The Hall of Fame competitions started with only the original twenty-five levels that were built into Bike or Die!. After people began to redistribute their levels on the internet, levels by players slowly began to be included in the Hall of Fame, starting in September 2004. By March 2005, several hundred levels were available, so instead of using levelpacks made by a single person, compilation packs with levels made by several designers became a standard. This trend was not entirely true however, as the thirteenth levelpack, BikeForce was primarily created by the user PiNerd. 163 of these levels are currently in the Time Trial competition. Most of these levels were made by players, and are typically selected for Time Trial inclusion by popular demand. Levels are occasionally added to the Time Trial in groups of 10-16 levels. Level packs usually consist of about 15 levels, but packs range from three to over 100 levels each.

== Sequel: Bike or Die! 2 ==
A new version of the game, Bike or Die! 2, was released on the iOS App Store on November 19, 2008, as well as being released for Palm OS as an optional update. The 2.0 update contained new 3D effects and upgraded graphics. The update did not change the core gameplay, and as a result, upgrading to version 2 was not mandatory. Users could still compete in the online rankings using either version of the game without penalty.

IGN rated version 2.0 of the iOS port of Bike or Die 2 as "decent", while Pocket Gamer verdict was 4/5 stars. While the game's value for money, range of visual options and large number of player-created levels were praised, the trial-and-error gameplay was criticized, due to the 'springy' and 'floaty' physics of the bike, and the frustration of having to restart a level after making a mistake. Other commentators felt that the precise control required to play the game did not translate well to using on-screen touch controls. It was observed that rather than the speed required in other racing games, a slower, patient problem-solving was often required to progress. However, less than a month after the IGN review, Bike or Die was updated with a new "Save and Resume" feature, in order to make the game "easier and less frustrating for new players". This feature allowed a player to restart the level from a previous save point, so that they do not have to start a level from the beginning each time they crash. Attempts to complete a level using the resume feature were marked as ineligible to submit to the online scoring system.

The iOS game was not updated beyond August 2009, and the game was eventually removed from the App Store. Since iOS apps can only be downloaded via the iOS App Store, as of 2019 the only remaining way to play Bike or Die! is on Palm OS devices.

The online hall-of-fame helped to create a competitive community around the game, one which remained active for several years, even beyond the decline of the Palm OS platform, and the discontinuation of the iOS app.

== Sequel: Bike or Die! 3 ==
In October 2020, Szymon Ulatowski, the game's creator, revealed on the Bike or Die! forum that he is working on Bike or Die! 3 for Android. No further details are publicly known yet.

== Bike or Die! revival ==
An unofficial project is underway to recreate the Bike or Die! game engine, for use on modern platforms. Few details are available at present.

== See also ==
- Elasto Mania – a similar game for Windows, and iOS
- X-moto – a similar game for Linux, Windows, and OS X
- Trials HD – a similar game for Xbox Live Arcade
