= X-Moto =

2005 video game

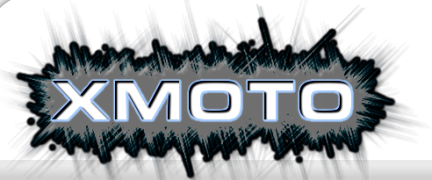

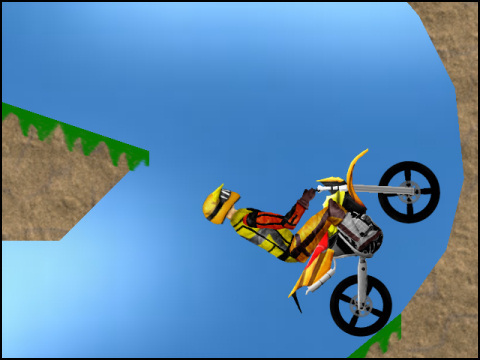
- Developer: Nicolas Adenis-Lamarre (Rasmus Teislev Neckelmann)
- Release: 2005; 21 years ago
- Stable release: 0.6.3 / 31 March 2025
- Platform: Linux, FreeBSD, Mac OS X and Microsoft Windows
- Type: Platform
- License: GPL-2.0-or-later
- Website: xmoto.org
- Repository: github.com/xmoto/xmoto

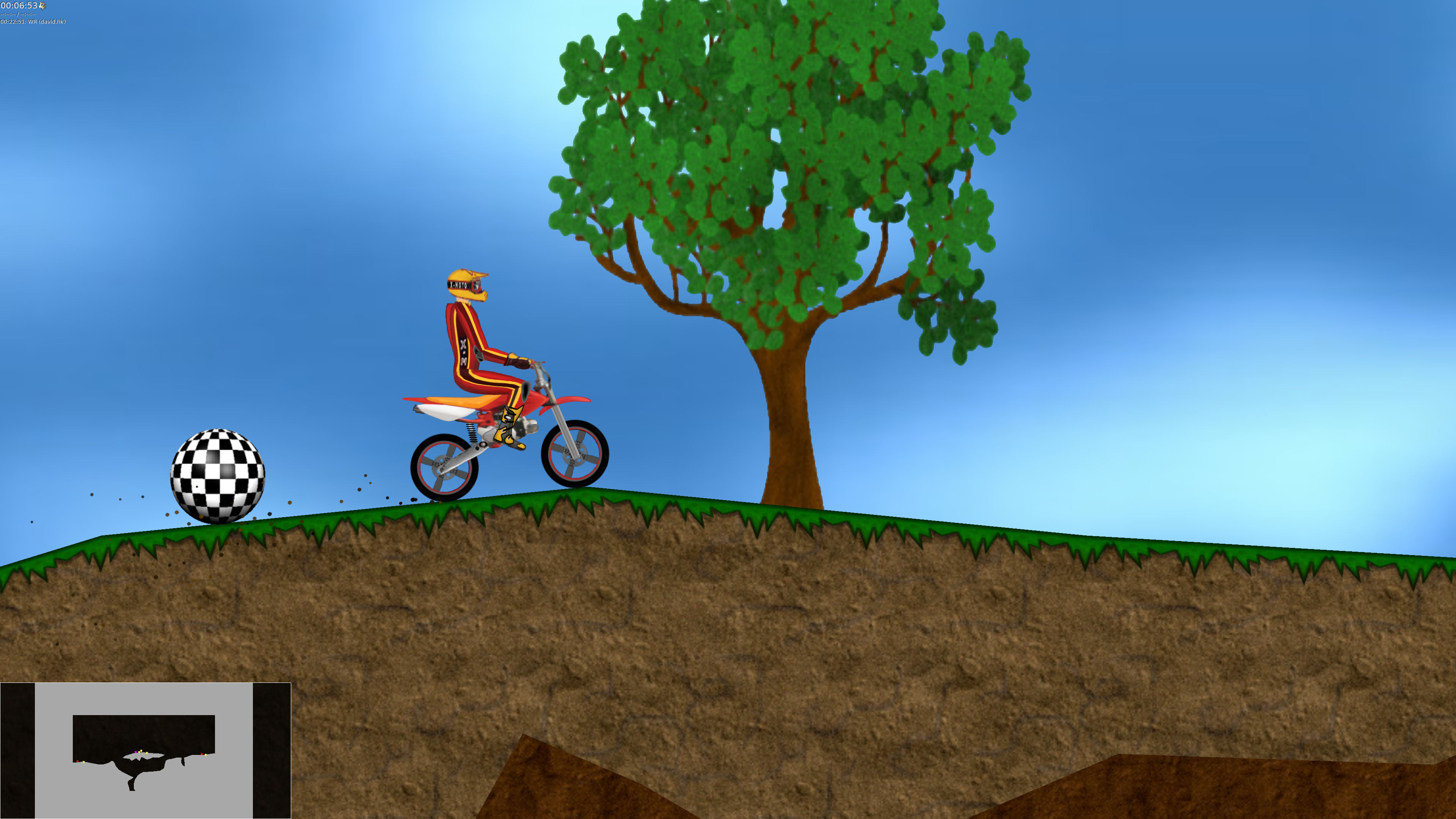
Screenshot of X-Moto 0.6.1

X-Moto is a free and open source 2D motocross platform game developed for Linux, FreeBSD, Mac OS X and Microsoft Windows, where physics play an all-important role in the gameplay. The basic gameplay clones that of Elasto Mania, but the simulated physics are subtly different.

== Gameplay ==
In X-Moto, a player selects a level and tries to collect the strawberries. Strawberries are required to complete a level, along with touching a flower. Obstacles to this goal are challenging terrain features and "wrecker" objects which should not be touched; in most levels there are no moving objects (only scripted or physics levels may have them). Also, these can be changed in some levels. The driver is not harmed directly by falling, only by hitting his head on rock or hitting any part of his body or the bike on a wrecker object. If this happens the level is lost (as of version 0.5.3 levels can feature check points). It is possible to save a replay, and to show a previous replay ("ghost driver") in parallel to gameplay.

The game is extensible with over 2500 user-created custom levels that can be automatically downloaded. These are created using Inkscape with the Inksmoto extension.

== Development ==
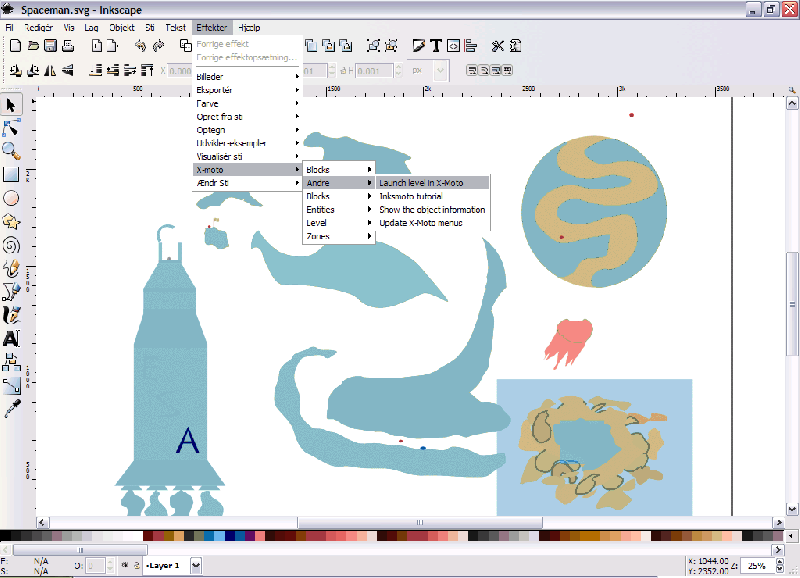
Level creation for X-Moto with Inkscape

The project was started in 2005 on a sourceforge.net repository. The game was developed completely 2D, but utilizing 3D hardware acceleration (OpenGL) for faster rendering. An optional non-OpenGL ultra low requirements vector wireframe render mode is available that should run on any legacy platform. Graphics are kept simple, sound is sparse. The game features only engine sounds, level lost/won sounds, and a strawberry pickup sound, while the main menu features a single soundtrack. Levels can feature their own music.

The game uses the Open Dynamics Engine for physical simulation. Moving objects, variable gravity and other features can be provided by scripting the levels using the Lua programming language. As of version 0.5.0, integration with the Chipmunk physics engine enables levels with multi-body dynamics.

== Reception ==
X-Moto was selected in May 2008 and April 2015 as "HotPick" by Linux Format. Thinkdigit 2009-05 ranked X-Moto among the "Most addictive Linux games". The game was included in Heinz Heise's c't software collection 6/2009 of the c't issue 24/2009.

== See also ==
- List of open source games
- Elasto Mania - a similar game for Windows and iOS
- Bike or Die! - a similar game for Palm OS
- Trials HD - a similar game for Xbox Live Arcade
