= HSW =

HSW may refer to:

- Hall School Wimbledon, in Wimbledon, London, England
- Harvard Business School, Stanford Graduate School of Business and Wharton School of the University of Pennsylvania, often considered among the three top business schools in the U.S. and are referred to together when referencing their cachet or desirability
- Haswell (microarchitecture)
- Health and Safety at Work etc. Act 1974, of the United Kingdom
- Hellenic Seaways, a Greek ferry operator
- Heswall railway station, in England
- Historical Society of Washington, D.C.
- Howard Scott Warshaw (born 1957), American game designer
- HowStuffWorks, a website
- HSW International, now Remark Media
- HSW Łuczniczka, a stadium in Bydgoszcz, Poland
- Hungry Shark World, a video game published by Ubisoft.
- Huta Stalowa Wola S.A., a Polish steel mill
