= Monster Trucks Nitro =

- Series logo
- Developer: Ubisoft RedLynx
- Publishers: Miniclip, Ubisoft RedLynx
- Engine: Unity used for Windows & Mac OS version
- Platforms: Monster Trucks Nitro; Flash, Windows, Mac OS X, iOS; Monster Trucks Nitro 2 iOS
- Release: Monster Trucks Nitro; December 19, 2008 (Flash, Windows, Mac OS X); March 27, 2009 (iOS); Monster Trucks Nitro 2 April 5, 2010 (iOS)
- Mode: Single-player

Monster Trucks Nitro is a series of platform racing video games developed by Ubisoft RedLynx. The first game in the series, Monster Trucks Nitro was released on December 19, 2008 for the Flash, Windows and Mac OS X platforms and on March 27, 2009 for the iOS platform. A sequel, entitled Monster Trucks Nitro 2, was released on April 5, 2010 exclusively for the iOS platform.

The game is played by controlling the throttle, brake and pitch of a monster truck as they proceed through a level. The original Nitro received mixed reviews from critics. The PC version holds a 54% score at aggregate website GameRankings. Monster Trucks Nitro 2 received higher scores in general, and currently has an aggregate score of 80/100 at Metacritic.

== Gameplay ==
In the Monster Trucks Nitro series players must guide a monster truck along a two-dimensional path as quickly as possible.

The Monster Trucks Nitro series is played as a sidescrolling racing game. Players have control over the monster truck's acceleration and brakes and have can also control the vehicle's pitch while in the air. A limited amount of pitch control is given to the player while on a surface, augmented by accelerating or braking. The Nitro part of the series' title comes from the game's focus on earning nitrous by either collecting bottles or performing flips while in the air. Depending on the game version the nitrous either fires immediately or charges, waiting for the player to press the nitrous button. In either case it provides a speed boost for the truck.

Gameplay varies slightly depending on the platform and game played. On iOS devices both Monster Trucks Nitro and its sequel are played using on-screen touch controls in combination with tilting the device. The original Monster Trucks Nitro is played using the keyboard on the Flash, Windows and Mac OS X platforms. The Flash version is also unique in that it does not use a 3D engine, but rather a 2D version similar to RedLynx's original Trials game.

== Development and marketing ==
The original Monster Trucks Nitro game was released on December 19, 2008 for Microsoft Windows and Mac OS X. It was released for iOS devices on March 23, 2009. On July 5, 2010 an update was released which added additional content. A new monster truck with a paint scheme resembling the American flag was added, along with additional races. In the press release that announced the update Ubisoft RedLynx stated that the game had received over 1.5 million downloads. Monster Trucks Nitro 2 was announced on March 26, 2010. It was released for the iOS platform on April 5, 2010. On July 5, 2010 a new Adventure League mode and four additional levels were added to Nitro 2, bringing the total number of levels to 24.

== Reception ==
Reception

Aggregate scores
Aggregator	Score
GameRankings	54% Nitro (PC)
Metacritic	80/100 Nitro 2

The original Monster Trucks Nitro received mixed reviews from critics. Aggregate website GameRankings reports a score of 54% for the Windows version with only one review. In the April 2009 issue of PC Format the Windows version of the game received a score of 54/100. Absolute Game's Michael Kalinchenko gave the Windows version a 69%. Kalinchenko explained that while the game can be enticing initially it lacks the rating system that its sister game, Trials 2 has. He felt that the price was high when compared to the amount of content given. Macworld's Chris Holt rated the Mac OS version a 3/5. He praised the simplicity and challenge of the game, yet felt it was too short and had too little gameplay options. Pocket Gamer's Tracy Erickson gave the iOS version a 5/10. Erickson explained that the detailed 3D graphics were not enough to overcome the "lack of satisfying gameplay". AppSpy's Damian Chiappara gave the iOS version of game a 3/5. Chiappara noted that Nitro had satisfying Trials-styled gameplay, and also explained the players can use iTunes during gameplay. He gave poor marks for the lack of selectable trucks. Ben Griffin of Know Your Mobile gave the same version a 4/5. He called the game "hugely rewarding" and further stated that it "easily delivers compelling and instant thrills."

Monster Trucks Nitro 2 received higher scoring reviews. It holds an aggregate score of 80/100 at Metacritic. It received two perfect scores: from AppSmile's reviewer, Slide to Play's Andrew Podolsky, and Andrew Nesvadba of AppSpy. The lowest score of a 60% approval rating came from the March 2011 issue of GamePro. and Pocket Gamer's Damien McFerren. The majority of reviews had a 70% or higher approval rating. GamePro's reviewer stated that though the levels felt short they were "well-suited to the design of [the] game." Rip Empson of PC World called Monster Trucks Nitro 2 "a welcome improvement from its predecessor". Touch Arcade reviewer Jared Nelson gave the game a 3.5/5. Nelson stated that the game "has impressive graphics, loads of content to play through, and an over the top fun factor".
