= Trials Rising =

2019 video game

- Developers: Ubisoft RedLynx; Ubisoft Kyiv
- Publisher: Ubisoft
- Series: Trials
- Platforms: Nintendo Switch; PlayStation 4; Windows; Xbox One; Stadia
- Release: Nintendo Switch, PlayStation 4, Windows, Xbox One; February 26, 2019; Stadia; November 19, 2019
- Genre: Racing
- Modes: Single-player, multiplayer

Trials Rising is a 2019 racing video game developed by Ubisoft RedLynx and Ubisoft Kyiv and published by Ubisoft. It was released for Nintendo Switch, PlayStation 4, Windows, and Xbox One on February 26, 2019 and for Stadia on November 19, 2019. It is the first mainline entry in the Trials series since 2014's Trials Fusion, and the first in the series to be released on a Nintendo console.

== Gameplay ==
In Trials Rising, the player controls a rider on a physics-based motorcycle from the start of the level to the end while navigating a number of obstacles. The game features obstacle courses set in various parts of the world such as the Eiffel Tower and Mount Everest, and players can compete against each other in both local and online multiplayer. The game allows players to view other players’ best personal performance and they will be notified when the player's record is broken by others. In addition to being able to create custom obstacle courses and share it with other players, players can also customize the rider's outfit and the motorcycle. A local multiplayer mode called “Tandem Bike” is introduced in Rising, which two riders control the same motorcycle. Each player will be responsible for controlling a part of the balance and power of the vehicle.

== Development ==
The game was announced by Ubisoft at its E3 2018 press conference. Ubisoft RedLynx and Ubisoft Kyiv served as lead developers on the title. In order to ensure that players will understand the game's control scheme and gameplay mechanics, Ubisoft RedLynx invited several YouTubers and members of the Trials community to test and provide feedback regarding the game's tutorial (among those invited were Achievement Hunter's Gavin Free and Jack Pattillo, both of whom provided shouts for the playable biker). A closed beta was held in September 2018, followed by an open beta in the week prior to release in February 2019. Trials Rising was released for Microsoft Windows, Nintendo Switch, PlayStation 4, and Xbox One on February 26, 2019 and for Stadia on November 19, 2019.

== Reception ==
Reception

Aggregate score
Aggregator	Score
Metacritic	NS: 78/100; PC: 83/100; PS4: 79/100; XONE: 85/100

Review scores
Publication	Score
Destructoid	PS4: 8/10
Game Informer	PS4: 7.25/10
GameSpot	PS4: 7/10
GamesRadar+	PS4:
IGN	7.9/10
Jeuxvideo.com	17/20
Nintendo Life	8/10 stars
Nintendo World Report	NS: 8.5/10
USgamer	PS4:

The game received generally positive critic reviews according to review aggregator website Metacritic.

=== Accolades ===
The game was nominated for "Best Racing Game" at the 2018 Game Critics Awards, and for "Racing Game of the Year" at the 23rd Annual D.I.C.E. Awards.
