= Howrse =

2005 video game

- Developer: Owlient
- Publisher: Owlient
- Platforms: Browser, Android, iOS
- Release: Browsers; September 8, 2005 iOS; 2011; Android; January 30, 2014
- Genre: Simulation
- Mode: Single-player

Howrse is a free-to-play browser game developed by French studio Owlient and currently published by Ubisoft. It is a breeding simulation game with horses.

== History ==
In 2005, two computer science students, Vincent Guth and Olivier Issaly, founded Owlient. Their first game, Equideow, which is the French version of Howrse, went online on the same day, as one of the first games to prominently use micro-transactions for funding. Guth and Issaly ended their studies in 2006 in order to devote time to their company.

Other versions in more languages followed, and Owlient as of 2015 had games in 24 languages. In 2008, the company partnered with Gut Aiderbichl, a German animal protection association. Players could donate in-game passes in Howrse to donate money to the association. Later that year, it was announced that over €7,500 were raised that way. In 2010, an additional €25,000 was raised and donated to Gut Aiderbichl. During Christmas 2008, the company tried to sell in-game items and cardboard collectible cards for the first time. These card were offered in three languages. Each card contained a code that unlocked in-game items.

In 2009, it was announced that the company had reached break-even. In July 2011, Ubisoft acquired Owlient.

The game was endorsed by prominent equestrians, who appeared on the start pages of different versions. In 2009, Meredith Michaels-Beerbaum endorsed the international version of Howrse, while her husband Ludger Beerbaum endorsed the German version in 2008. French equestrian Nicolas Touzaint endorsed the French version Equideow. In 2014, Zara Phillips appeared in the British version of the game. She is displayed on the starting page and as a figurine that gives advice to the players. According to the news article, Zara Phillips was the first member of the Royal Family to appear in a video game.

== Community ==
In 2010 it was announced that the game had over 12 million players - 5 million on the English and French versions, respectively, 1.6 million on the German version and nearly 2 million new players each month. According to Owlient's homepage in 2014, 55 million players played Howrse. A 2011 survey showed that males play Howrse as well, especially in countries like Brazil, Portugal and Spain, where about 50% of all players are male. In other countries, the percentage of female players reaches 90%. In 2009, a more detailed analysis about the community of the German version was published. About 7% were under 10. About 55% of all players were between 10 and 15. This section showed a peak for the 13-year-olds. About 11% of all German players were between 20 and 30 and another 7% were above 30.

== In-game purchases ==
In the game, players can obtain so-called "passes". These can be purchased and serve as an in-game currency in order to buy in-game items. These items change the appearances of the horses, boost their skills, and alter their life cycle. Players can also use passes to buy equus, another in-game currency. Players can only use passes if they have a valid email address. In 2005 Owlient was one of the first companies to use micro-transactions.

== Criticisms ==
The in-game purchases are a subject of criticism in different media outlets. Since the horse-based topic appeals to younger players, critics say that young people might be tempted to spend money. The consumer advice centre in North Rhine-Westphalia (Germany) advised in 2009 against free-to-play games and cited Howrse, among other games, as an example. They criticized advertisements with equestrians, saying that Howrse is "extremely easy" and "without problems playable for younger players" (das "denkbar einfache" Spiel, das "problemlos auch für jüngere Spieler" zu nutzen sei.). In 2011, the German TV magazine Frontal21 claimed that a girl called a number to buy passes 267 times, without her parents' knowledge.

== Awards ==
In February 2009, Howrse won two Browser Game of the Year 2008 awards. The first was in the category "Best Tycoon", and the other was "Audience Awards". In March 2011, Howrse won another Browser Game of the Year Award in the category "Community Relations".
