= High Seize =

2005 video game

- Developer: RedLynx
- Publisher: Nokia
- Platform: Nokia N-Gage
- Release: EU: October 13, 2005; NA: October 18, 2005
- Genre: Turn-based tactics
- Modes: Single player, multiplayer

High Seize is a turn-based tactics video game for the Nokia N-Gage, published by Nokia and developed by RedLynx, released in late 2005.

== Story ==
A retired navy captain is forced return to his swashbuckling days, as his father is kidnapped by a notorious pirate. As events unfolds, the captain has to hunt for mythical treasures and take on the most feared of all pirates, Black Barlow.

== Features ==
High Seize can be played both as a single-player game, and in a multi-player mode, using either hot-seat, N-Gage Arena or a local Bluetooth connection.

== Reception ==
Reception

Aggregate score
| Aggregator | Score |
|---|---|
| Metacritic | 87/100 |

Review scores
| Publication | Score |
|---|---|
| GameSpy | 4.5/5 |
| IGN | 8/10 |

The game received "generally favorable reviews" according to the review aggregation website Metacritic. The Academy of Interactive Arts & Sciences nominated High Seize for "Cellular Game of the Year" during the 9th Annual Interactive Achievement Awards.
