= Pathway to Glory: Ikusa Islands =

2005 video game

- Developer(s): Ubisoft RedLynx
- Publisher(s): Nokia
- Platform(s): Nokia N-Gage
- Release: 2005
- Genre(s): Turn-based tactics
- Mode(s): Single-player, multiplayer

Pathway to Glory: Ikusa Islands is a tactical turn-based game for the Nokia N-Gage, published by Nokia and developed by Ubisoft RedLynx, released in late 2005. The game is a sequel to the original Pathway to Glory.

== Story ==
Commanded by an old navy veteran McDouglas, a squad of allied soldiers take on the horrors of the Pacific Theatre. Only their strong ties to each other and to the seasoned veteran commander can keep them alive.

Ikusa Islands can be played in single-player and multiplayer mode, using either hotseat, N-Gage Arena or a local Bluetooth connection.
