= Trials 2: Second Edition =

2008 video game

- Developer: RedLynx
- Publisher: RedLynx
- Series: Trials
- Engine: RedLynx Theathre
- Platform: Windows
- Release: March 18, 2008
- Genres: Racing, platform
- Modes: Single-player, multiplayer

Trials 2: Second Edition is a racing video game developed and published by RedLynx. It is available for the Windows operating system through the developer's online store, and Valve's digital distribution system Steam. It was released on March 18, 2008 on the game's website, and May 28, 2008, on Steam. It is a remake of the 2007 game Trials 2.

== Gameplay ==
The objective of the game is to get from the start of the level to the end through a number of obstacles as fast as possible. The player must balance and control their speed so that they don't fall. There is a clock so that the player is pressured into completing the level faster, which ensures replayability. The game also has achievements, similar to Xbox 360 achievements. The game's multiplayer features include highscores, ghost challenge (where the user plays against the ghost of any other player in the high score list) and online player profiles with team, country and player statistics. The game uses 3-D graphics, but is played on a 2-D plane, so the player can only move forwards, backwards, up or down (not left or right).

== Reception ==
Trials 2: Second Edition was well received by critics. The game got an average score of 81% on GameRankings and 82% on Metacritic. 2404.org gave it 9.1/10, simply saying "It's one of those games which hooks you immediately."

== See also ==
- Excitebike
- Kikstart 2
- Motocross Maniacs
- Elasto Mania (and its clone Bike or Die)
- Trials HD
