= Pathway to Glory =

2004 video game

- Developer: Ubisoft RedLynx
- Publisher: Nokia
- Platform: Nokia N-Gage
- Release: NA: November 24, 2004; EU: November 26, 2004
- Genre: Turn-based tactics
- Modes: Single-player, multiplayer

Pathway to Glory is a tactical turn-based game for the Nokia N-Gage, by Nokia and Ubisoft RedLynx, released in late 2004.

== Story ==
In the summer of 1943, special forces are urgently needed in the struggle for Europe. The player commands a multinational unit of highly trained men and accomplishes action-packed, historical missions by defending, ambushing, destroying and attacking.

Pathway to Glory can be played in single-player and multiplayer mode, using either hotseat, N-Gage Arena or a local Bluetooth connection.

== Reception ==
Reception

Aggregate score
Aggregator	Score
Metacritic	83/100

Review scores
Publication	Score
Edge	8/10
Electronic Gaming Monthly	7.33/10
Game Informer	7.75/10
GameSpot	8.1/10
GameSpy	4.5/5
GameZone	8.9/10
The Sydney Morning Herald	4.5/5
The Times	5/5

The game received 83/100 reviews according to the review aggregation website Metacritic. GameSpot nominated Pathway to Glory as the Best of E3 2004, the best N-Gage Game: "Pathway to Glory is our N-Gage Best of E3 pick because it offers a cohesive, refined, and original take on the strategy genre. The fact that Nokia appears to be pulling it off on a developing, port-laden platform makes the achievement all the more impressive."

== Sequel ==
A sequel for Pathway to Glory was announced during E3 2005, titled Pathway to Glory: Ikusa Islands. It was released in 2005.
