= DrawRace =

2009 video game

- Developer: Ubisoft RedLynx
- Platform: iOS
- Release: 2009
- Genre: Racing game

DrawRace is an iOS line-drawing/racing game developed by Ubisoft RedLynx. DrawRace 2, the sequel to the original DrawRace, was released in September 2011.

== Critical reception ==
Pocket Gamer UK gave the game 8/10, concluding "A simple innovation gives DrawRace enormous appeal, transforming a plain racing game into connected, intuitively controlled fun". AppSafari gave the game 4.5/5, writing "DrawRace uses hand drawn characters and artwork, and has a fast paced soundtrack to keep you pumped up. If you are at all into line drawing games, and or are a fan of slot racing games, this is a must have." AppSpy gave the game a 4 out of 5, writing "There's not much meat to this game, but you'll find yourself pleasantly cruising to the end of the game as you enjoy each new track. The perfect "line" may be elusive, but you may find yourself coming back for "one more" try."

The Appera wrote " DrawRace is a rather novel concept in video game racing. Instead of actually controlling the car, you simply trace the path around the track your car should take. Then you sit back and watch it race. It honestly sounds like a boring concept, but in practice it's quite entertaining. Throw in multi-player hot seat, network racing, and the ability to race against your own best times, and you have quite a nice little package here. The game doesn't look or sound too shabby, either."
