= DrawRace 2 =

2011 video game

- DrawRace 2 HD application icon
- Developer: Ubisoft RedLynx
- Publisher: EA Chillingo
- Series: DrawRace
- Platform: iOS
- Release: September 1, 2011
- Genre: racing
- Modes: Single-player, multiplayer

DrawRace 2 is a racing video game developed by Ubisoft RedLynx and published by EA Chillingo. It was released September 1, 2011 for iOS devices, and serves as the sequel to DrawRace. It is played by drawing an ideal racing line on the game's screen with a finger. The car then follows this line during a race. The game was well received by critics, and holds a four stars rating and an average score of 88/100 at review aggregator Metacritic.

== Gameplay ==
In DrawRace 2 the player creates a driving path for their vehicle (shown in red) with their finger prior to each race. Their car then follows that path during the race.

DrawRace 2 is a racing game in which the player predetermines their vehicle's route around a given track by drawing an ideal racing line. The entire course is seen from a top down perspective, similar to the 1986 arcade game Super Sprint. The game includes 30 tracks, 16 cars and 180 challenges for players to complete. Leaderboards and leagues are also included. Multiplayer can be played with 2-4 players.

It differs from most top-down racers in that players use their finger to draw the route their car will take for all given laps. Players can draw faster or slower to have the car accelerate and brake once the race begins. Once all laps are drawn by the player the race begins, and the player's vehicle will follow the drawn path, taking into account the speed at which the player drew the route. During the actual race players can control a turbo boost button to give their car an increase in speed. This boost recharges over time.

== Development and marketing ==
DrawRace 2 was released September 1, 2011 for iOS devices. On November 8, 2011 a free version entitled DrawRace 2 Free Multiplayer was released. The version includes 2-4 player gameplay, three tracks and three cars.

== Reception ==
Reception

Aggregate score
Aggregator	Score
Metacritic	88/100

Review scores
Publication	Score
Edge	9/10
Eurogamer	9/10
VideoGamer.com	8/10
Gamezebo	4/5
AppSpy	5/5
Slide to Play	4/4

DrawRace 2 received mostly positive reviews from critics. The game holds a score of 88/100 at Metacritic. The site also reports five media outlets gave the game perfect scores: AppSpy, Slide to Play, AppSmile, TouchGen, and Vandal Online. The lowest score came from Pocket Gamer France's reviewer, who gave the game a 68% approval rating. The game was the top seller the week of its release in several European countries, and placed in the top ten in more than 45 countries. VideoGamer.com listed it in their Top Racing Games of 2011, and Game Informer listed it in their "20 Mobile Games You Should Be Playing" feature.

GameZone's Andrew Hayward said "DrawRace 2 melds racing and strategy in a unique and iPad-centric sort of way". He further stated that while the control scheme probably would not "evolve the racing genre", it worked well for touchscreen devices. In Metro's review of the game critic Roger Hargreaves called it "the most addictive and enjoyably infuriating turn-based game of the year." Hargreaves cited the large amount of content, multiplayer features, and presentation as high points of the game. Toby Moses of The Guardian also praised the game. He stated that it was an improvement over the original DrawRace, and felt that it "could well be the must-have app of the year."

Slide to Play's Andrew Webster felt the game was a major improvement over its predecessor. He called it "a more fleshed out and expansive experience". Eurogamer's Kristan Reed thoroughly enjoyed the game — so much so that it prompted a change the site's mobile review format. Previously all reviewed games were covered under a blanket feature known as Mobile Games Roundup. Reed stated that in the new format highly rated games would not be limited to a small review, but in the future "games as brilliant as DrawRace 2 [will now] on will get the extra depth they deserve." He further noted that the price-to-value ratio was extremely high, and even jokingly stated that players should send RedLynx additional money past the purchase to make up for the value. The critic from Edge magazine called it the "exceptional sequel to the iOS racing line racer." The reviewer further noted that though the original DrawRace was good, the sequel "makes it look like an amateur effort."
