= 1000 Heroz =

2011 video game

- App icon
- Developer: Ubisoft RedLynx
- Publisher: Ubisoft RedLynx
- Platform: iOS
- Release: June 8, 2011
- Genre: Puzzle-platform
- Mode: Single-player

1000 Heroz is a puzzle-platform game developed and self-published by Ubisoft RedLynx. It was released June 8, 2011 for iOS devices. It is unique in that a new level has been introduced each day since its release, and will continue to be until 1,000 days are reached. Online leaderboards for the newest level are open for 24 hours, after which time they are closed.

The game received generally positive reviews. Aggregate website Metacritic reports an aggregate score of 74/100, with the majority of individual review scores a 70/100 ratio or higher. Critics praised the concept of a new playable level each day, citing that it inspired competition within the game.

== Gameplay ==
Gameplay screenshot

1000 Heroz is a physics-based puzzle-platform game. The goal in each level is to reach the finish line as quickly as possible; faster times yield better rewards. The game's physics are exaggerated, creating a feeling of lowered gravity. It is unique in that every day since its release to 1,000 days since release a new hero and level are introduced. Each previous level and hero remain playable after their initial introduction. Levels are designed to be short and can take less than 30 seconds to complete. Custom Leagues are provided to allow players to create a network of friends to compete with. Leaderboards are included to encourage competition both between friends and worldwide.

== Development and marketing ==
1000 Heroz was unveiled by developer Ubisoft RedLynx for the iOS platform on March 31, 2011. "We've designed 1000 Heroz to last for a thousand days, so whether you play every day or play only occasionally, there's always something new for you," stated RedLynx Creative Director Antti Ilvessuo. "It's a new idea, where you can get your daily dose of Heroz right from the start." The game was released on June 8, 2011. Developer RedLynx explained that only one week later the game had hit one million restarts. Each restart represents another attempt to play a level. "Over 1 million restarts in such a short time -- for a new kind of game like this -- is remarkable," said Tero Virtala, CEO of RedLynx. On August 26, 2011 an update was released for the game. Support for multiple custom friend leagues, new gameplay elements, faster characters and other features were introduced. It became free to play on November 22, 2011.

In early 2012 a man used the game to propose to his then girlfriend. They played the game together daily. He contacted the developer to ask whether they could include a banner at a finish line to pop the question. Ubisoft RedLynx accepted the request and on January 12, 2012 the level including the banner became active in the game. "It took about five seconds for it to hit her and then she was in tears and just asking 'How?'" stated the man. The story received media attention from media outlets such as Pocket Gamer, Metro and Kotaku.

== Reception ==
Reception

Aggregate score
Aggregator	Score
Metacritic	74/100

Review scores
Publication	Score
Edge	6/10
Pocket Gamer	7/10
AppSmile	4.5/5
TouchArcade	4/5
Slide to Play	3/4

1000 Heroz received "mixed or average reviews" from critics, according to review aggregator Metacritic. Of the nine reviews listed, six were 75% or higher, while the remaining three were 60% or higher. The highest score was that of a 90% approval rating from AppSmile's reviewer, while the lowest of 60% approval came from Edge's reviewer.

The critic from Edge magazine felt that while the game was a solid platformer, it did not "feel like something [consumers would] be playing in a month, never mind three years." The game was compared to RedLynx's popular Trials franchise. The reviewer felt that while the touchscreen controls were strong, the game did not have the lasting appeal that the Trials games do. Keith Andrew, Deputy Editor of Pocket Gamer, disagreed. He noted that the "1000 Heroz's series of daily races [makes the game] undoubtedly hard to put down". Andrew also explained that the game requires elements of strategy to reach the top scores on the global leaderboards, creating replay value.

AppSmile's reviewer praised the game's cartoon art style and its simple, responsive controls. The reviewer criticized the fact that players could not go back to previous levels and improve their global leaderboard times. Touch Arcade's Nissa Campbell explained that levels take little time to complete, and that the short time may actually entice players to play each day and compete for high scores. Jason D'Aprile of Slide to Play gave high marks for level design, calling it "clever." He cited multiple paths to the finish, various obstacles and objects such as springboards as items that led to the strong design. D'Aprile stated that 1000 Heroz was a "quick, cheap gaming fix on the go".
