= RedLynx =

Finnish video game developer

RedLynx Ltd
- Native name: RedLynx Oy
- Formerly: Punainen Ilves Laboratoriot Oy (2000–04)
- Type: Limited company (osakeyhtiö), subsidiary
- Industry: Video game industry
- Founded: 17 August 2000; 26 years ago
- Founders: Atte Ilvessuo; Antti Ilvessuo
- Headquarters: Helsinki, Finland
- Key people: Celine Pasula (managing director)
- Products: Trials series
- Revenue: €11.8 million (2022)
- Number of employees: 135 (2022)
- Parent: Ubisoft (2011–present)
- Website: www.redlynx.com

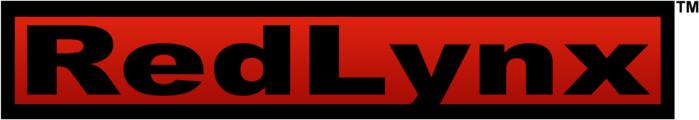
Former logo of RedLynx

RedLynx Ltd (also known as Ubisoft RedLynx, natively RedLynx Oy, formerly Punainen Ilves Laboratoriot Oy) is a Finnish video game developer founded in 2000. The company is based in Helsinki. It is best known for the Trials series of racing games. RedLynx was acquired by Ubisoft in 2011.

== History ==
RedLynx was founded by brothers Atte and Antti Ilvessuo on 17 August 2000. They had also founded the video game developer WAH-Software earlier. RedLynx started as a small independent game development studio, focusing on mobile and browser games. In the 2000s, RedLynx developed games for Nokia mobile phones, including N-Gage titles like Pathway to Glory, High Seize and Reset Generation. The company originally operated under the name Punainen Ilves Laboratoriot (lit. Red Lynx Laboratories), but it was renamed RedLynx on 3 June 2004. RedLynx was acquired by French video game publisher Ubisoft on 2 November 2011.

After its acquisition by Ubisoft, the studio released several entries in the Trials franchise, including Trials Evolution, Trials Fusion, and Trials Rising, while providing development support for other Ubisoft titles like Star Wars Outlaws. In October 2025, Ubisoft announced it would lay off up to 60 employees and refocus the studio on developing mobile games.

On October 14 2026, Ubisoft announced they are planning to shut down RedLynx following the negotiation process with the Finland authorities.

== Games developed ==
Year	Title	Platform(s)
2000	Trials	Browser
2003	Trials Bike Basic	Browser
2003	Trials Bike Pro	Java
2004	Pathway to Glory	N-Gage
2004	Trials Construction Yard	Java
2005	High Seize	N-Gage
2005	Pathway to Glory: Ikusa Islands	N-Gage
2005	Trials Mountain Heights	Java
2007	Warhammer 40,000: Squad Command	Nintendo DS, PlayStation Portable
2007	Trials 2	Browser, Microsoft Windows
2008	Trials 2: Second Edition	Microsoft Windows
2008	Reset Generation	Microsoft Windows, N-Gage
2008	Monster Trucks Nitro	Browser, Mac OS X, Microsoft Windows, iOS
2008	Trials Dynamite Tumble	Browser
2009	DrawRace	iOS
2009	Monster Trucks Nitro II	iOS
2009	Trials HD	Xbox 360
2010	Trials Legends	Microsoft Windows
2011	1000 Heroz	iOS
2011	DrawRace 2	Android, iOS
2011	MotoHeroz	Android, iOS, Wii
2012	Trials Evolution	Xbox 360
2012	Nutty Fluffies	iOS
2013	Trials Evolution: Gold Edition	Microsoft Windows
2014	Trials Frontier	Android, iOS
2014	Trials Fusion	Microsoft Windows, PlayStation 4, Xbox 360, Xbox One
2016	Trials of the Blood Dragon	Microsoft Windows, PlayStation 4, Xbox One
2017	DrawRace 3: World Championship	Android, iOS
2017	South Park: Phone Destroyer	Android, iOS
2019	Trials Rising	Microsoft Windows, Nintendo Switch, PlayStation 4, Xbox One
2020	Tom Clancy's The Division 2	Stadia
2023	Gwen's Getaway	Android, iOS
