= Trials Evolution =

2012 video game

- Developers: Ubisoft RedLynx; Ubisoft Shanghai
- Publishers: Microsoft Studios; Ubisoft (PC)
- Composer: Mike Reagan
- Series: Trials
- Engine: Bullet Physics Library
- Platforms: Xbox 360 (XBLA); Microsoft Windows
- Release: Xbox 360; April 18, 2012; Origin of Pain; October 5, 2012; The Riders of Doom; December 19, 2012; Windows: NA: March 21, 2013; AU: March 21, 2013; EU: March 22, 2013
- Genres: Platform, racing
- Modes: Single-player, multiplayer

Trials Evolution is a racing video game for the Xbox 360 and Microsoft Windows in which each player controls a motorcycle trials rider who traverses an obstacle course. The game was developed by Ubisoft RedLynx and published by Microsoft Studios. It is a follow-up to Trials HD of 2009 and successor to several preceding Trials games by the same developers.

The Xbox 360 version was released via Xbox Live Arcade on April 18, 2012. In 2013 it was released as Trials Evolution: Gold Edition, including a bundled copy of Trials HD. On all game platforms Trials Evolution includes a course editor to allow users to create their own scenarios.

== Gameplay ==
In Trials Evolution the player controls a rider trying to traverse an obstacle course on a bike heavily influenced by physics.

In Trials Evolution, the player controls a rider on a physics-based motorcycle from the start of the level to the end while navigating a number of obstacles. The objective is to complete the course as fast as possible and with as few crashes, known in the game as faults, as possible. The game uses 3D graphics, but is played on a 2D plane, so the rider can only move forwards and backwards. Players can also control the bike's pitch on the ground or while in the air. The simple control scheme offers an "Easy to learn, hard to master" concept of gameplay. High level players can be seen relying heavily on very particular micro-adjustment techniques in order to complete tracks of extreme difficulty.

Evolution allows up to four players to compete simultaneously on the same console or over Xbox LIVE. Specialized tracks allow for four players to ride alongside one another, similar to Nintendo's Excitebike, while in others players complete in-line, with a player's friends appearing as ghost bikes on the course. As players progress through the single player portion of the game they will earn money that can be used to customize their rider and motorcycle's appearance. Another new addition to the gameplay is the line of movement can now curve, the controls will remain the same but the map and driving line can swerve to make for more creative and challenging maps. 50 single player tracks are included with the game. Players are able to track several statistics such as medals earned, money earned, and other stats. These can then be compared with their Xbox Live friends. Leaderboards are also included.

=== Editor ===
Players can also design and share their own maps utilizing the in-game editor. As with its predecessor, Trials HD, players are given the same editor that the developer used to create the game's levels. This time players are given two variants of the editor. The Lite Editor is similar to Trials HD 's in that players can create courses in a user-friendly manner. The game's Pro Editor provides full access to content creation; players can use not only the features of the Lite Editor, but can also use the game's visual programming language to create entirely different scenarios. Demonstrations of the Pro Editor showcased scenarios similar to popular games such as Angry Birds, 'Splosion Man, Marble Blast Ultra, Xevious and others. Additionally a first-person shooter and top-down perspective racing game were demonstrated. Weather and lighting conditions can be changed to allow for nighttime, dusk, foggy and other atmospheric settings.

Tracks can now be shared via an in-game interface. With Evolution's predecessor tracks could only be shared via those on a player's friends list, however players will now be able to browse through multiple categories such as Most Popular tracks and can also create a custom search. Over 1,500 objects are available to players to create their custom scenarios. Leaderboards will also be tracked for user-created environments. In Trials HD gameplay was restricted to a warehouse setting. In Evolution the setting is a two-by-four kilometer outdoor environment. While the game is set outdoors, players will be able to re-create warehouse-based courses if they desire. Jason Bates, Director of Marketing and PR at RedLynx stated that "we (RedLynx) expect people to recreate some of the classic levels".

== Development and marketing ==
The huge success of Trials HD made it possible for us to finally create the game of our dreams.

— Sebastian Aaltonen, Lead Programmer at Ubisoft RedLynx, Eurogamer interview

With the game's predecessor, Trials HD, players expressed concerns with the rate at which the difficulty curve climbed. Developer Ubisoft RedLynx addressed this concern in Trials Evolution by placing tutorial levels in each of the game's difficulty tiers. Players are required to earn a certain number of medals before they can progress forward, ensuring that they will have the necessary skills to meet the challenge of future levels. The game engine was upgraded from the version used in Trials HD. Draw distance was increased, allowing for roughly 500 meters of visible area at any time. The game runs at a locked 60 frames per second. In Trials HD all in-game assets were loaded into system RAM at startup, but in Evolution designers chose to stream all content. This allowed for a much larger gameplay world, higher resolution textures, and more objects to be used in-game. A new visual scripting system was also implemented. This allowed both Ubisoft RedLynx and community to create entirely new skill games; in Trials HD the skill game code was part of the game's core. As with its predecessor, Trials Evolution uses an optimized version of the Bullet Physics Library to handle the game's physics. Ubisoft RedLynx's Sebastian Aaltonen stated that feedback from players and Trials HD's high sales allowed RedLynx to make the game they had aimed to create. The soundtrack was penned by Mike Reagan, who had previously worked on the God of War series. The voice work for the game was done by three Pennsylvanian voice actors: Art Webb, Rake Yohn and Brandon DiCamillo of Jackass fame.

Trials Evolution was announced at Electronic Entertainment Expo (E3) 2011. It was shown to the press and public at Penny Arcade Expo (PAX) Prime 2011 and Gamescom 2011. It was also shown at Game Developer's Conference (GDC) 2012 as well as to public at PAX East 2012. In March 2012, Microsoft announced that Xbox Live Arcade titles would soon have double the gamerscore, a new total of 400 points. Microsoft created a promotion known as Arcade Next to further publicize this change which would run from April 18, 2012 to May 9, 2012. Trials Evolution was selected to be the first release with a date of April 18, 2012 and was joined by Bloodforge, Fable Heroes and Minecraft in the promotion.

== Reception ==
Trials Evolution

Aggregate scores
Aggregator	Score
GameRankings	(X360) 91.58% (PC) 87.00%
Metacritic	(X360) 90/100 (PC) 85/100

Review scores
Publication	Score
Eurogamer	9/10
G4	4.5/5
Game Informer	9/10
Giant Bomb	5/5
IGN	9/10
Joystiq	5/5
Official Xbox Magazine (UK)	8/10
Official Xbox Magazine (US)	9.5/10

Trials Evolution received universal acclaim from critics. It holds an aggregate score of 91.58% at GameRankings, and fellow aggregate website Metacritic reports a score of 90/100. The game received five perfect scores: Joystiq's Ben Gilbert, Digital Spy's Liam Martin, Brad Shoemaker of Giant Bomb, Gameblog.fr's reviewer as well as Gamereactor Sweden's Jonas Elfving. The lowest score of an 80% approval rating came from three reviewers: Neil Davey of Guardian.co.uk, Ryan Rigney of Wired magazine, and a staff member from Official Xbox Magazine UK. The game sold an estimated 100,000 units in its first day. It was the highest selling day-one release on Xbox Live Arcade until the release of Minecraft: Xbox 360 Edition three weeks later. The game had sold over 1 million units by the end of 2012.

During the 16th Annual D.I.C.E. Awards, the Academy of Interactive Arts & Sciences nominated Trails Evolution for "Racing Game of the Year".

Ryan McCaffrey of Official Xbox Magazine praised the game's overall appeal. He cited the game's visuals, core gameplay, multiplayer, track editor and replay factor all as high points. He stated that "Trials Evolution is as close to a perfect download as we’re ever likely to get." He did note, however that the game's soundtrack may not appeal to all players, a statement to which Game Informer's Dan Ryckert and IGN's Daemon Hatfield agreed. Tom Bramwell of Eurogamer cited the fact that all the game's levels were created using the same editor currently in the game, a point to which he gave high marks.

The reviewer from Official Xbox Magazine UK praised the inclusion of multiplayer, improved visuals and a better sense of progression. The reviewer cited the fact that license tests must be passed to unlock additional tracks helped player progression. The critic from Edge magazine called Trials Evolution "the deepest online experience in XBLA history." The reviewer stated that it built upon the footing of its predecessor, Trials HD, citing the evolution in gameplay similar to Dark Souls's evolution of Demon's Souls. The critic felt that the new skill games weren't imaginative enough, but conceded that the editing tools are powerful enough to create more robust games.
