= Trials Frontier =

2014 video game

- Developer: RedLynx
- Publisher: Ubisoft
- Series: Trials
- Platforms: iOS, Android
- Release: WW: April 10, 2014; NA: September 10, 2014 (Android)
- Genres: Platform, racing
- Mode: Single-player

Trials Frontier is a platform racing video game developed by RedLynx and published by Ubisoft for iOS and Android in 2014. It is a spin-off of the Trials series designed to accompany Trials Fusion.

== Reception ==
The iOS version received "mixed" reviews according to the review aggregation website Metacritic.

Reception

Aggregate score
Aggregator	Score
Metacritic	64/100

Review scores
Publication	Score
Edge	5/10
Eurogamer	5/10
Game Informer	7/10
GamesMaster	40%
Gamezebo	3.5/5
Hyper	70%
MacLife	2/5
Pocket Gamer	3.5/5
Shacknews	7/10
VideoGamer.com	6/10
Digital Spy	3/5
