= Trials Fusion =

2014 video game

- Developers: Ubisoft RedLynx; Ubisoft Shanghai; Ubisoft Kyiv
- Publisher: Ubisoft
- Designer: Karri Kiviluoma
- Composer: Petri Alanko
- Series: Trials
- Platforms: Microsoft Windows; PlayStation 4 Xbox 360; Xbox One
- Release: PlayStation 4: NA: April 15, 2014; PAL: April 16, 2014; Xbox 360 & Xbox One: WW: April 16, 2014; Windows: NA: April 16, 2014; PAL: April 24, 2014
- Genres: Platform, racing
- Modes: Single-player, multiplayer

Trials Fusion is a platform racing video game developed by Ubisoft RedLynx in collaboration with Ubisoft Shanghai and Ubisoft Kyiv. A follow-up to Trials Evolution, it is the fifth game in the Trials series and is the first one to be released on a PlayStation platform. The game was released on Microsoft Windows, PlayStation 4, Xbox 360 and Xbox One in April 2014. A companion game, Trials Frontier, was released on iOS and Android devices and designed to accompany the console and PC title. Ubisoft released six paid DLC packs, as well as several free content updates. Online multiplayer was added in an update on January 24, 2015.

Trials Fusion was generally well received upon release. Critics praised the level design, controls, graphics, the futuristic setting, and the amount of content, but criticized the lack of tutorials for the game's create mode, and its similarity to past Trials games. By February 2015, the game had sold over 1.7 million units.

== Gameplay ==
Like previous games in the series, Trials Fusion presents an arcade take on the real-life sport of observed trials. The player controls a rider on a physics-based motorcycle from the start of the level to the end while navigating a number of obstacles. The game uses 3D graphics, but is played on a 2D plane, so the rider can only move forwards and backwards. The player controls how the rider shifts their weight forward and backward in order to perform wheelies and stoppies as well as flips while in the air and controlling how the bike lands. Trials Fusion, like the other games in the series, is known for, among other things, its notorious difficulty, particularly towards the end of the game. Unlike in previous Trials games, players can also perform freestyle motocross stunts while in the air by moving the right analog stick. Also new to the Trials series is the ability to choose a quad bike for a handful of levels: the 'TKO Panda'. Other vehicles included are motorbikes 'Baggie', 'Roach', 'Pit Viper', and 'Foxbat', minibike 'Donkey', the cat in the 'Unicorn MK II' and BMX bike, 'Rabbit'.

Trials Fusion also features a track editor, allowing players to create their own courses and games.

Trials Fusion's multiplayer allows up to 8 players (PS4, Xbox One and PC) to race in different tracks, while the Xbox 360 version of the game only supports 4 players. Online multiplayer was added in an update on January 24, 2015.

== Setting ==
The game is set in the year 2042, after an object "fell from the sky and changed our world", and after the creation of the "Anomaly AI". Descended from this AI are two characters, SynDI and George whose disembodied voices are heard by the player's character, Rider, throughout the game. Also in the events leading up to the game, the UN has designated some parts of the planet as "United Nations Ungoverned Regions".

== Reception ==
=== Critical response ===
Reception

Aggregate score
| Aggregator | Score |
|---|---|
| Metacritic | (PC, XOne) 80/100 (PS4) 79/100 (X360) 77/100 |

Review scores
| Publication | Score |
|---|---|
| Destructoid | (X360) 8/10 |
| Eurogamer | (PS4) 8/10 |
| Game Informer | 8/10 |
| GameRevolution | (PS4) 8/10 |
| GameSpot | (XOne) 8/10 |
| GameTrailers | (PS4) 8.8/10 |
| IGN | 8.2/10 |
| Joystiq | (PS4) 4/5 |
| PlayStation Official Magazine – UK | (PS4) 8/10 |
| Official Xbox Magazine (US) | (XOne) 8/10 |
| PC Gamer (UK) | (PC) 85% |
| Polygon | (PS4) 6.5/10 |
| Shacknews | (PS4) 7/10 |
| VentureBeat | (XOne) 90/100 |
| Digital Spy | (XOne) 4/5 |
| National Post | (PS4) 8.5/10 |

The game received "generally favorable reviews" on all platforms according to the review aggregation website Metacritic.

Game Informer's Matt Miller stated: "Trials Fusion, like its predecessors, is a bundle of fun packaged in frustration, repetition, and memorization. If that kind of punishment is your cup of tea, Fusion offers more of what you've come to expect. The existing formula is an awfully good one, but with few meaningful steps forward, it's easy to feel like we've crashed down this road before." Lucas Sullivan of GamesRadar+ spoke positively of the replayability, addictiveness, and physics of the Xbox One version, but disliked the FMX tricks, story, and certain level designs.

GameSpot's Tom McShea praised the course design of the Xbox One version, calling it "clever" and "imaginative", the motocross style tricks, the rewards system, the track editor, which he called "powerful", and the optional objectives. He did however heavily criticize the game's create mode for having poor tutorials; he called the creation tools the "one downside" of the game and said that "without a proper tutorial, [he] couldn't wrap [his] head around the obtuse tools". Vince Ingenito of IGN said: "Trials Fusion's precision controls and exacting challenge make it a great pickup for leaderboard perfectionists." Polygon's Russ Frushtick was more critical of the PS4 version and said in his review that "Every aspect of Fusion feels like a less imaginative experience that coasts rather than strives for something better. There's no question that the core Trials gameplay within Trials Fusion remains fun. But the host of missing features and bad design choices make it a significant step backwards after Evolution and for the franchise."

GameZone gave the PlayStation 4 version nine out of ten, saying that it "doesn't change up the formula drastically from its predecessors, but adds some nuances that helps it distinguish itself. It might come with a few graphical hiccups that detract from its beauty, but the fun factor eclipses any of these issues." Push Square gave the same console version nine stars out of ten, calling it "one of the best games on the PlayStation 4, there's no doubt about that. Convince your friends to get it, and established relationships will turn sour faster than an Evel Knievel-esque stunt. Challenging, funny, and exciting – gaming rarely gets any better than this." EGMNow gave the same console version eight out of ten, saying, "While Trials Fusion isn't the best entry in the long-running motorbike-racing franchise, the core of what made previous entries so great remains, which should satisfy longtime fans and newcomers alike." Edge gave the PC version eight out of ten, saying, "While it attempts to blend FMX, quad bikes and more familiar Trials action, the new elements sit uneasily with the old. Trials has always been about precision and skill, traits that are blunted or obfuscated by four-wheel drive and fussy inputs." Retro Gamer gave the Xbox One version 78%, saying, "It still works fantastically well thanks to solid online integration and cleverly designed tracks, but the core formula is starting to wear a little thin."

411Mania gave the PlayStation 4 version a score of nine out of ten, saying, "I'm always excited to come back and play the Trials games, and while ultimately it's more of the same, that's not a bad thing. As long as Redlynx [sic] can keep turning out tracks of this quality, I won't stop playing anytime soon." National Post gave the same console version 8.5 out of 10, saying, "Trials Fusion, like its predecessors, is a super-charged, neck-breaking blast of a motorbike game, and solidifies the franchise's status as the Excitebike of our time." The Digital Fix gave the same console version eight out of ten, saying, "Ultimately what RedLynx has done here is create Trials for the current generation, and brought it to more folks than ever before given the cross-platform availability." Digital Spy gave the Xbox One version four stars out of five, saying, "Trials Fusion may not make as far of an evolutionary leap forward as its predecessor, but that doesn't make it any less worthy a successor to the Trials name." Metro gave the PS4 version a score of seven out of ten, saying that it was "Not an evolution like the last game, and certainly not a revolution – there's a great deal of fun still to be had in Trials Fusion but unfortunately not much in the way of new ideas."

In a special edition of Edge, listing their 100 top videogames of all-time, Trials Fusion was one of only two racing games on the list, along with OutRun 2006: Coast 2 Coast. Trusted Reviews put the game their list of the best racing games of 2018. VideoGamer.com listed the game as the 10th best racing game of all time.

=== Sales ===
As of February 25, 2015, the game sold 1.7 million units.
