= Hungry Shark =

Video game series

- Developer: Ubisoft London
- Publisher: Ubisoft
- Engine: Unity
- Platforms: iOS/iPadOS/tvOS; Android
- Genres: Survival; Action
- Mode: Single-player

Hungry Shark is a series of arcade-style aquatic survival video games originally developed by Future Games to later be acquired and published by Ubisoft London (prior to Hungry Shark Evolution) and Ubisoft (since Hungry Shark Evolution). The Hungry Shark games allow players to control several unique species of sharks, including mako sharks, great white sharks, hammerhead sharks, reef sharks, megamouth shark, megalodon, basking sharks and whale sharks. The main objective is to consume other marine animals to gain points and survive across an open map, and grow in size until the next, more powerful shark is available for purchase. In May 2016, Hungry Shark World was downloaded 10 million times in six days, reaching the top 10 free iPhone and Android apps. In 2018, Hungry Shark World was released for the Xbox One, PlayStation 4 and Nintendo Switch. It featured better graphics, and the complete removal of micro transactions. In 2022, it reached 1 billion downloads across all platforms.

== Video games ==
=== Hungry Shark Trilogy (2010–2011) ===
- Hungry Shark: Part 1

The first game in the trilogy and the first in the series.

- Hungry Shark: Part 2

A sequel to the previous game.

- Hungry Shark: Part 3

The final game in the trilogy.

- Hungry Shark: Trilogy re-release

A compilation of the first 3 games, updated with HD graphics.

=== Hungry Shark: Night (2011) ===
The final game to be published solely by Future Games of London.

=== Hungry Shark Evolution (2012) ===
The first Hungry Shark game originally released by Future Games of London in 2012 and later published by Ubisoft in 2013 after the studio was officially acquired by the latter.

=== Hungry Shark World (2016) ===
A sequel to Hungry Shark Evolution, reached 30 million downloads on Google Play Store. The game includes 33 new sharks and many returning ones. The game is still being updated today.

=== Hungry Shark VR (2017) ===
A version of Hungry Shark that is in VR and runs on Google Daydream.

=== Hungry Dragon (2018) ===
A spinoff of Hungry Shark, where the player controls a flying dragon. This installment was not created by Future Games of London, instead being published and developed by Ubisoft Barcelona Mobile.

=== Hungry Shark Arena (2020) ===
Hungry Shark Arena is an online multiplayer shark battle royale game. The HTML5 game is available Desktop and Mobile.

=== Hungry Shark Primal (cancelled) ===
Hungry Shark Primal is a cancelled mobile game, developed by Ubisoft and set in prehistoric times, where players would control ancient sharks such as Dunkleosteus and other prehistoric marine creatures while feeding on dinosaurs and early life forms.

It entered open beta in the Philippines on April 21, 2023, via the Google Play Store, with plans for a full global release later that year.

The game was delisted from the Play Store in September 2023 following the closure of Ubisoft London, and on January 27, 2025, Ubisoft officially announced that development would not continue, shifting focus instead to supporting Hungry Shark Evolution and Hungry Shark World.

== Gameplay ==
Gameplay of Hungry Shark Evolution, featuring a Dunkleosteus as its playable character.

The Hungry Shark series revolves around a playable shark, consuming various marine and non-marine species, such as tropical fish, sardines, tuna, humans, or pelicans to gain points and survive across an open map the playable shark can traverse through. Playable sharks grow in size until subsequent, more powerful sharks are unlocked. The number of species the player is able to consume depends on the strength of the shark; for instance, in Hungry Shark Evolution, a reef shark cannot eat stingrays, but a mako shark is able to, or a tiger shark is unable to eat small mines, but a megalodon is able to. Not all creatures can be consumed, and some are hostile towards the shark.

As the player survives longer per game, the hazards posed to them increase; helicopters may begin dropping explosive barrels into the sea, or fisherman may seek out the player in an attempt to end their frenzy. In addition to these foes, the shark's health deteriorates faster as a game progresses, and more food has to be consumed to keep the health up; if the player goes without food for too long, the shark will die and the game ends. Some sharks possess a unique ability (such as freezing breath or a boost) that can be upgraded.

Like many other mobile games, the Hungry Shark series offers each game for free but charges real world money for additional gold (which can be acquired by playing the game) and gems (which can also be collected in the game). This freemium model has been met with criticism from some journalists.

== Accolades ==
Hungry Shark World was nominated for "Best Casual Game" at The Independent Game Developers' Association Awards 2018.

== Animated series ==
An animated series titled Hungry Shark Squad is in development at Ubisoft Motion Pictures.
