= Trials (series) =

- Genres: Racing, platformer
- Developer: Ubisoft RedLynx
- Publisher: Ubisoft
- Platforms: Java, Flash, Windows, Xbox 360, Xbox One, Xbox Series X/S PlayStation 4, PlayStation 5, Nintendo Switch, Android, iOS, Stadia
- First release: Trials; 2000
- Latest release: Trials Rising; 26 February 2019

Trials is a racing game series developed by Ubisoft RedLynx and published by Ubisoft, loosely based on the real-life sport of motorcycle trials. It involves a motorcycle rider in a 2.5D world, traversing obstacles under the influence of simulated physics.

== History ==
Trials was released as a browser game in 2000. The gameplay was somewhat similar to Mastertronic's 1987 hit Kikstart 2.

Trials 2 was released in 2007, and remade as Trials 2: Second Edition in 2008. Trials HD was released for the Xbox Live Arcade in 2009. Trials Evolution was released for the Xbox Live Arcade in 2012. Trials Frontier was released for smart phones and tablets on 10 April 2014.

Trials Fusion released for PlayStation 4, Xbox 360, and Xbox One on 16 April 2014. Trials Frontier and Trials Fusion are designed to work together. Trials Fusion was released for the PC on 24 April 2014.

On 11 June 2018 Trials Rising was announced by RedLynx at E3 2018. It was released for PlayStation 4, Xbox One, Nintendo Switch, and PC on 26 February 2019 and for Stadia on 19 November 2019.

== Games ==
=== Main series ===
Year	Title	Platform
2000	Trials	Java
2007	Trials 2	Flash
2009	Trials HD	Xbox 360
2012	Trials Evolution	Xbox 360, Windows
2014	Trials Fusion	Windows, PlayStation 4, Xbox 360, Xbox One
2019	Trials Rising	Windows, PlayStation 4, Xbox One, Nintendo Switch, Stadia

=== Other games ===
Year	Title	Platform	Type
2003	Trials Bike Basic	Java	Expansion
2003	Trials Bike Pro	Java	Expansion
2004	Trials Construction Yard	Java	Expansion
2005	Trials Mountain Heights	Java	Expansion
2008	Trials Dynamite Tumble	Flash	Spin-off
2008	Trials 2: Second Edition	Windows	Remake
2010	Trials Legends	Windows	Remake
2014	Trials Frontier	Android, iOS	Spin-off
2016	Trials of the Blood Dragon	Windows, PlayStation 4, Xbox One	Spin-off
