= Trials HD =

2009 video game developed by RedLynx

- Developer: RedLynx
- Publisher: Microsoft Game Studios
- Series: Trials
- Engine: Bullet Physics Library
- Platform: Xbox 360 (XBLA)
- Release: August 12, 2009
- Genres: Puzzle, racing
- Mode: Single-player

Trials HD is an Xbox Live Arcade game developed by RedLynx and published by Microsoft Game Studios. It was released on August 12, 2009 as part of the second annual Xbox Live Summer of Arcade and was later re-released in a retail pack alongside Limbo and 'Splosion Man in April 2011. It is a 2.5D puzzle/racing game. The player must guide a trial motorcycle with exaggerated physics through various obstacles to reach each stage's finish line. On September 6, 2012, it was announced that a Microsoft Windows version of Trials HD would be bundled inside a special version of Trials Evolution, dubbed Trials Evolution: Gold Edition—although this version changes the physics of the game. It is the third game in the series. On February 11, 2016, Microsoft added Trials HD as part of its backwards compatibility program for Xbox One.

== Gameplay ==
In Trials HD players must manipulate the rider and motorcycle to traverse obstacles and objects found throughout each level.

In Trials HD the player controls a rider on a physics-based motorcycle from the start of the level to the end while navigating a number of obstacles. The objective is to complete the course as fast as possible and with as few crashes, known in the game as faults, as possible. The game uses 3D graphics, but is played on a 2D plane, so the rider can only move forwards and backwards. Players can also control the bike's pitch at slow speeds or while in the air.

The game has a variety of courses in a range of difficulties from beginner to extreme. There are a total of thirty-five courses in the game, and players can replay completed courses to attempt a faster time. Tournament mode sees the player attempt to complete a number of courses in sequence, trying to achieve a fast overall time with minimal faults. Twelve skill games can also be unlocked which place the player in different challenges. These include things such as riding inside or on top of a large spherical cage, achieving as many flips as possible within a set time limit, or towing a trailer with two large bombs as far as possible while keeping them from exploding by impact. Players earn medals based on their completion time, number of faults, and in the case of skill games, other specialized criteria.

When connected to Xbox Live, the player can view their performance in relation to players in their friends list. This is done by an in-game meter which displays the closest friend to the player's time which adjusts based on whether the player is leading or trailing the friend's course time. Trials HD includes a level editor that allows players to construct their own courses and share them with players in their friends list. Every course in the game was created using the level editor, which allows users to create professional-quality levels. It also features leaderboards for each of the game's courses and modes. For each course the fastest five thousand times are able to be viewed as replays. During the replay the viewer can view that recorded player's controller presses, allowing them to learn patterns and skills from it.

== Development and marketing ==
Trials HD is the second 2.5D game in the Trials series, following Trials 2: Second Edition. The game is based on the popular flash games from the same series. It was released on August 12, 2009 as part of the second annual Xbox Live Summer of Arcade. RedLynx developed Trials HD using an in-house engine coupled with a modified version of Bullet Physics Library which was optimized to utilize the Xbox 360's CPU and vector units. RedLynx applied the physics system to give a realistic feel, but to maintain the enjoyment of a video game, they tweaked the physics to "bend the reality in just the proper way." RedLynx saw this as a "crucial thing in making Trials such a fun and addictive game" Previous Trials games used a much simpler in-house physics engine, however for Trials HD developers opted to use the Bullet library and devote one of the 360's cpu cores entirely to physics. Developers also improved on the Trials 2 engine by adding more advanced lighting and real time soft shadows.

Trials HD levels were created using the same in-game editor which players can also use to create and share their own levels.

Levels created for Trials HD were designed using the same in-game level editor that allows players to make user-based content. All of the tools and abilities the developers had at their disposal can be used by the community. In an interview with Eurogamer, RedLynx's Lead Programmer Sebastian Aaltonen stated that there were no plans to port the game to other platforms, adding "Trials HD technology has been specially designed for the Xbox 360 feature-set." The voice work for the game was done by three Pennsylvanian voice actors, Rake Yohn, Brandon DiCamillo, and Art Webb.

Trials HD was announced June 1, 2009 at a Microsoft luncheon during E3 2009. It was released August 12, 2009 as part of the Xbox Live Summer of Arcade. On December 23, 2009 the first downloadable content, known as the Trials HD Big Pack, was released. The content features twenty three new courses, new objects for the game's built-in level creator and new achievements. A second downloadable content pack was announced for the game in July 2010. The Trials HD Big Thrills Pack features forty new courses made by RedLynx, but unlike the Trials HD Big Pack it also features ten user created courses. These ten courses are to be decided from entries to the Big Thrills Track Creation Competition. The top three contestants were awarded prizes of $5,000, $3,000, and $1,000, respectively. Winners were announced on November 15, 2010. The Big Thrills Pack was released December 1, 2010.

== Reception and sales ==
Reception

Aggregate score
Aggregator	Score
Metacritic	86/100

Review scores
Publication	Score
Destructoid	9/10
Eurogamer	9/10
GamePro	4.5/5
GameRevolution	B+
GameSpot	8/10
GameSpy	4/5
GameTrailers	8.5/10
GameZone	9/10
Giant Bomb	4/5
IGN	8.3/10
Official Xbox Magazine (US)	8/10
Teletext GameCentral	7/10

Award
Publication	Award
Xbox Live	Best Overall Arcade Game, Best Innovation (2009)

Trials HD received "favorable" reviews according to the review aggregation website Metacritic. In its first month, the title sold over 300 thousand units. On September 14, 2010 RedLynx announced that Trials HD had surpassed 1.3 million units in sales. Sales of the first downloadable content pack had also exceeded 360 thousand, with the second pack selling over 90 thousand units. On May 27, 2011 RedLynx announced that sales have exceeded two million units. In 2009, Trials HD received two awards voted on by the Xbox 360 community, Best Overall Arcade Game and Best Innovation. In a September 2010 ranking, IGN listed Trials HD sixteenth in their top twenty-five Xbox Live Arcade titles of all time. It was also awarded a perfect score by Xbox World 360.

Reviewers generally praised the game's replay value. IGN's Daemon Hatfield remarked that Trials HD had "truckloads of content" adding that the game's features "really take advantage of what can be done with Xbox Live." GameTrailers staff also praised the amount of content in the game stating that it was an excellent value for the price. Eurogamer stated that "it's a game built for endless replay and community expansion beyond that." The game's leaderboards, especially the ability to have a view of where other players were at a certain time during a run, were widely praised by Brad Shoemaker of Giant Bomb.

One of the primary criticisms given by critics was Trials HD's steep difficulty curve. Brad Shoemaker of Giant Bomb stated that he wished the difficulty curve was "a little smoother." Daemon Hatfield of IGN further commented on the game's difficulty, stating "It's when you get stuck trying to get over some small hill and you see that fault counter in the top left corner counting up [...] that the game starts being more frustrating than fun." GameSpy's Anthony Gallegos added that the "limited number of tries per track feels arbitrary." He was also critical of the game's file sharing system, noting that instead of a repository from which to download tracks that sharing is limited to those in the player's friends list. Tom McShea of GameSpot also agreed that the difficulty on the latter tracks was "ridiculously hard" and shared disappointment in the file sharing system.

== See also ==
- Trials Evolution
