= Eighth generation of video game consoles =

Gaming generation from 2012 to 2024

The eighth generation of video game consoles began on November 18, 2012, with the release of Nintendo's Wii U home console. This was followed by the release of Sony's PlayStation 4 family on November 15, 2013, Microsoft's Xbox One family on November 22, 2013, and Nintendo Switch family on March 3, 2017.

The generation offered few signature hardware innovations. Sony and Microsoft continued to produce new systems with similar designs and capabilities as their predecessors, but with improved performance (processing speed, higher-resolution graphics, and increased storage capacity) that further moved consoles into confluence with personal computers, and furthering support for digital distribution and games as a service. Motion-controlled games of the seventh generation had waned in popularity, but consoles were preparing for advancement of virtual reality (VR), with Sony introducing the PlayStation VR in 2016. Sony focused heavily on its first-party developers and console exclusives as key selling points, while Microsoft expanded its gaming services, creating the Xbox Game Pass subscription service for Xbox and Windows computers, and its xCloud game streaming service. Microsoft and Sony consoles saw mid-generation refreshes, with high-end revisions PlayStation 4 Pro and the Xbox One X, and lower-cost PlayStation 4 Slim and Xbox One S models that lacked some features. As of June 2023, the PlayStation 4 and Xbox One families had sold an estimated 117 and 58 million units, respectively.

Nintendo remained on a separate strategic path from Sony or Microsoft. The Wii U was designed to be a more robust Wii to appeal to dedicated gamers, but its means and intended use cases were lost in how it was marketed. The Wii U substantially undersold Nintendo's projections, selling only 13.56 million units by its discontinuation in 2017, which drove Nintendo to release the Nintendo Switch in the same year, its design and marketing accounting for several of the faults of the Wii U while meeting a broad range of global demographics and possible gaming configurations, including hybrid use between a home and handheld console. Later, Nintendo released the Nintendo Switch Lite, a version that lacked the Switch's docking capabilities but had other component optimizations and was otherwise compatible with all games, and the Nintendo Switch – OLED Model, a mid-lifetime refreshed model that featured an OLED screen with a built-in Ethernet port for a wired internet connection, though it did not introduce any performance improvements. By June 2026, the Nintendo Switch family had shipped 156.59 million units, outselling the Nintendo DS and ranking second in all-time console sales.

Handheld consoles fought against increasing pressure of mobile gaming. The Nintendo 3DS and 2DS succeeded the Nintendo DS line, while the PlayStation Vita was the successor to the PlayStation Portable. The Nintendo 3DS/2DS family sold nearly 76 million by September 2020, but the PlayStation Vita was estimated to have sold about 16 million units by September 2018. Sony discontinued the PlayStation Vita in 2019 and stated it had no present plans for handheld systems. Nintendo discontinued the Nintendo 3DS in 2020, ending the Nintendo DS families of systems. The Switch Lite acts as its de facto handheld successor.

The eighth-generation console market was also influenced by the lifting of China's ban on video game consoles in 2015, as well as the growth of the mobile gaming sector. A number of retro microconsoles were also released during this period.

In November 2020, Microsoft and Sony released the Xbox Series X and Series S and PlayStation 5 respectively. Considered to be their highly anticipated next generation systems, they continue the trend from the eighth generation with overall general improved computational performance, graphical output, and strong backward compatibility support to minimize the disruption of upgrading to the new platform.

== Background ==
This generation was predicted to face competition from smartphones, tablets, and smart TVs. In 2013, gaming revenue on Android overtook portable game console revenue, while remaining a distant second to iOS gaming revenue. In fiscal year (FY) 2013 (ending early 2013), Nintendo sold 23.7 million consoles, while Apple sold 58.2 million iPads in FY 2012 (ending late 2012). One particular threat to the traditional console game sales model has been the free-to-play model, wherein most users play free, and either a small number of dedicated players spend enough to cover the rest, or the game is supported by advertising.

The PlayStation 4, Xbox One, and Wii U all use AMD GPUs, and two of them (PS4 and XBO) also use AMD CPUs on an x86-64 architecture, similar to common personal computers (as opposed to the IBM PowerPC Architecture used in the previous generation). Microsoft, Nintendo, and Sony were not aware that they were all using AMD hardware until their consoles were announced. This shift was considered to be beneficial for multi-platform development, due to the increased similarities between PC hardware and console hardware. It also provided a boost in market share for AMD (which had faced increased competition from Intel in the PC market).

Various microconsoles (which are smaller and mostly Android-based) have been released since 2012, although they are seldom referred to as being part of the eighth (or any) generation of video game consoles. These microconsoles have included the Ouya, Nvidia Shield Console, Amazon Fire TV, PlayStation TV, MOJO, Razer Switchblade, GamePop, GameStick, and PC-based Steam Machine consoles. A number of microconsoles that were modeled as scaled-down versions of consoles from previous generations, running a selection of games from that console, were also released. These included the NES Classic Edition, the SNES Classic Edition, the PlayStation Classic, and the Sega Genesis Mini.

Cloud gaming options for the consoles also were developed in the eighth generation. PlayStation Now enables cloud gaming of PlayStation 2, 3, and 4 games to current PlayStation consoles and personal computers. Microsoft began developing a comparable service xCloud for Xbox and Windows games. Google released Stadia, a dedicated cloud gaming platform designed around reduced latency and advanced features not typical of these other cloud gaming options.

== Transition ==
While earlier console generations generally lasted five to six years, the shift from seventh to eighth generation lasted about eight. Unusually, the prior generation's best-selling unit, the Wii, was the first to be replaced in the eighth generation. In 2011, Microsoft and Sony officials said they considered themselves only halfway through a ten-year lifecycle for their seventh-generation offerings. The companies also said the addition of cameras and motion-based controllers like Xbox's Kinect and PlayStation Move extended these systems' lifetimes. Nintendo president Satoru Iwata said that his company would release the Wii U due to declining sales of seventh-generation home consoles and that "the market is now waiting for a new proposal for home consoles". Sony considered making its next console a digital download-only machine, but decided against it due to concerns about the inconsistency of internet speeds available globally, especially in developing countries.

The introduction of the high-end PlayStation 4 Pro and Xbox One X in 2016 and 2017, respectively, led to some journalists to call these machines part of a "half generation" step within the 8th generation, new consoles that would continue to drive sales without introducing a significantly different line of hardware that would segment their consumer base.

In 2020, Microsoft and Sony released their 9th-generation consoles: Xbox Series X and PlayStation 5. Both said they wanted a soft transition, meaning that the new hardware plays most or all of the platform's previous games. Microsoft said Xbox Series X can play all Xbox One games, including games from the Xbox 360 and original Xbox console that are playable on the Xbox One, and introduced its Smart Delivery program to update some Xbox One games to enable play on the Xbox Series X. Sony has said the "overwhelming majority" of PlayStation 4 games play on the PlayStation 5, and that many run at higher frame rates and resolutions.

=== Chinese market ===
The eighth generation of consoles also saw manufacturers re-enter the Chinese market. Since 2000, the Chinese government had banned the sale and distribution of video game consoles, citing concerns on their effect on youth. The ban led console gaming to a niche sector, including a black market for the purchase of these consoles, while also causing personal computing gaming to take off within China, including the spread of Internet cafes and PC bangs. This ban lasted through January 2014, where the Chinese government first opened up to allow the sale of consoles in the Shanghai Free-Trade Zone (FTZ). By July 2015, the ban on video game consoles was wholly lifted. Access to the Chinese video game market is lucrative, having an estimated 500 million potential players and representing over US$24 billion in revenues as of 2016.

Microsoft and Sony quickly took advantage of the lifting of the ban, announcing sales of the Xbox One and PlayStation 4 platforms within the FTZ shortly after the 2014 announcement. Microsoft established a partnership with BesTV New Media Co, a subsidiary of the Shanghai Media Group, to sell Xbox One units in China, with units first shipping by September 2014. Sony worked with Shanghai Oriental Pearl Media in May 2014 to establish manufacturing in the FTZ, with the PlayStation 4 and PlayStation Vita shipping into China by March 2015. CEO of Sony Computer Entertainment Andrew House explained in September 2013 that the company intended to use the PlayStation Vita TV as a low-cost alternative for consumers in an attempt to penetrate the Chinese gaming market.

Nintendo did not initially seek to bring the Wii U into China; Nintendo of America president Reggie Fils-Aimé stated that China was of interest to the company after the ban was lifted, but considered that there were similar difficulties with establishing sales there as they had recently had with Brazil. Later, Nintendo had teamed up with Tencent by April 2019 to help sell and distribute the Nintendo Switch as well as aid its games through the Chinese government approval process led by National Radio and Television Administration.

== Home consoles ==
=== Wii U ===
In November 2010, Nintendo of America CEO Reggie Fils-Aimé stated that the release of the next generation of Nintendo would be determined by the continued success of the Wii. Nintendo announced its successor to the Wii, the Wii U, at the Electronic Entertainment Expo 2011 on June 7, 2011. After the announcement, several journalists classified the system as the first eighth generation home console. However, prominent sources have disputed this because of its comparative lack of power and older disc media type with respect to the announced specifications for PlayStation 4 and the Xbox One.

The Wii U's main controller, the Wii U GamePad, features an embedded touchscreen that can work as an auxiliary interactive screen in a fashion similar to the Nintendo DS/3DS, or if compatible with "Off TV Play", can even act as the main screen itself, enabling games to be played without the need of a television. The Wii U is compatible with its predecessor's peripherals, such as the Wii Remote Plus, the Nunchuk, and the Wii Balance Board.

The Wii U was released in North America on November 18, 2012, in Europe on November 30, 2012, and in Japan on December 8, 2012. It came in two versions, the white Basic Model and the black Deluxe/Premium Model, at the price of $299 and $349 US Dollars, respectively. On August 28, 2013, Nintendo announced the production of the Basic model has ended and expected supplies to be exhausted by September 20, 2013. On October 4, 2013, the Deluxe/Premium model was price cut from US$349 to US$299.

The Wii U was initially expected to have lifetime sales of about over 100 million, comparable to the Wii. However, it only managed to have lifetime sales of about only 13 million, in sharp contrast with the Wii. This financially hurt Nintendo, with several financial quarters running at a loss through 2014. Nintendo had anticipated the Wii U would sell similarly to the Wii, but it ended up selling worse than the GameCube and became Nintendo's least successful home console to date.

Nintendo discontinued the Wii U on January 31, 2017, due to its commercial failure, to make way for its second competitor, the Nintendo Switch, released one month later.

=== PlayStation 4 ===
On February 20, 2013, Sony announced the PlayStation 4 during a press conference in New York City. The console places an emphasis on features surrounding social interaction. Gameplay videos can be shared via the PlayStation Network and other services. Users can stream games being played by themselves or others (either through the console, or directly to Twitch). The DualShock 4 is similar to the previous DualShock 3 controller with the addition of a touchpad and a "Share" button along with a Light-emitting diode bar on the front to allow motion tracking. The PlayStation Camera camera accessory is offered for the system, with stereo camera lenses up to 1280×800px resolution with support for depth sensing similar to Microsoft's Kinect. It also remains compatible with the PlayStation Move peripherals. Second screen capabilities are available through mobile apps and the PlayStation Vita, as well as cloud gaming streaming through the Gaikai service.

The PlayStation 4 was released on November 15, 2013, in North America and November 29, 2013, in Australia and Europe at US$399.99, A$549 and €399 respectively.

=== Xbox One ===
On May 21, 2013, Microsoft announced the Xbox One at an event in Redmond, Washington. The console focuses on entertainment, including the ability to pass television programming from a set-top box over HDMI and use a built-in electronic program guide, and the ability for computer multitasking by snapping applications (such as Skype and Internet Explorer) to the side of the screen, similarly to Windows 8. The controller has "Impulse Triggers" that provide Haptic technology feedback, and the ability to automatically record and save highlights from gameplay. An updated version of Kinect was developed with a 1080p camera and expanded voice controls. Originally bundled with the console it has since been excluded.

The Xbox One was released in North America, Europe, and Australia on November 22, 2013, at a launch price of US$499.99, €499 and A$599 respectively with Japan, and was later released in 26 other markets in 2014. It had two mid-generation upgrades, one cheaper option released in 2016 called the Xbox One S, and the other called the Xbox One X which added 4K gaming. Microsoft claimed that the Xbox One X was the "World's most powerful console" and 40% more powerful than any other console at the time of its release.

Production of the Xbox One family of consoles were discontinued shortly after the launch of their successor, the Xbox Series X and S, at the end of 2020.

=== Nintendo Switch ===
Due to the commercial failure of the Wii U, along with competition from mobile gaming, then-president Satoru Iwata sought to revitalize the company by creating a new strategy for Nintendo that included embracing mobile gaming, and developing new hardware that would be attractive to a wider range of audiences. The hardware product was announced under the codename NX in a press conference held with DeNA on March 17, 2015, and fully revealed as the Nintendo Switch on October 20, 2016. It was released worldwide on March 3, 2017, competing with the Xbox One and PlayStation 4.

The Switch is considered by Nintendo a home console that has multiple ways to play. The main unit, the Console, is a tablet-sized device with a touch-sensitive screen. It can be inserted into a Docking Station which allows games to be played on a connected television. Alternatively, two Joy-Con, motion-sensitive controllers comparable to the Wii Remotes, can be slotted onto the sides of the Console so the unit can be played as a handheld. Further, the Console can be set on a kickstand, allowing multiple players to see the screen and play games with separate Joy-Con. Additionally, Nintendo built the Switch on standard industry components, allowing for ease of porting games onto the system using standard software libraries and game engines rather than Nintendo's usual proprietary approaches. This enabled them to bring several third-party and independent game developers on board prior to launch to assure some third-party games in their software library.

Despite the Switch being significantly weaker in terms of processing power than its competitors, it was met with critical praise and commercial success. Nintendo had anticipated selling about 10 million Switches in the first year of release but ended up exceeding this projection with total first-year sales of over 17 million units, exceeding the Wii U's lifetime sales. In late 2017, the Nintendo Switch was the fastest selling console in US history, and in November 2018 it was the fastest selling of all the 8th generation consoles in the US.

A hardware revision, the Switch Lite, was announced on July 10, 2019, and was released on September 20, 2019. The unit integrates the Joy-Con onto the main console with a smaller form-factor, making the unit strictly handheld rather than a hybrid system. Further details are described below under Handhelds. A refreshed model, the Nintendo Switch – OLED Model, was announced on July 6, 2021, and was released on October 8, 2021, featuring a 7-inch OLED screen, a wider and adjustable stand, enhanced audio, a wired LAN port built into the dock, and 64 GB of internal storage.

=== Comparison ===
This table lists all major consoles and subsequent mid-generation releases, and does not include minor revisions or hardware changes, such as the "slim" revision of the PlayStation 4.

Comparison of eighth-generation video game home consoles
Console		Wii U	Nintendo Switch	Nintendo Switch – OLED Model	PlayStation 4	PlayStation 4 Pro	Xbox One	Xbox One S	Xbox One X
Logo									
Manufacturer		Nintendo			Sony Interactive Entertainment		Microsoft		
Image		A Deluxe Set black Wii U GamePad A Deluxe Set black Wii U console A Basic Set white Wii U console and GamePad	A Nintendo Switch in docked mode with Neon Blue & Neon Red Joy-Con controllers in grip A Nintendo Switch in handheld mode with Neon Blue & Neon Red Joy-Con controllers	A Nintendo Switch – OLED Model in docked mode with White Joy-Con controllers in grip A Nintendo Switch – OLED Model in handheld mode with White Joy-Con controllers	A PlayStation 4 console and DualShock 4 controller A white PlayStation 4 Slim console and a white DualShock 4 controller	A PlayStation 4 Pro console	An Xbox One console, wireless controller and Kinect sensor	An Xbox One S console and controller	An Xbox One X console
Release dates		NA: November 18, 2012; EU: November 30, 2012; AU: November 30, 2012; JP: December 8, 2012	WW: March 3, 2017	WW: October 8, 2021	PlayStation 4: NA: November 15, 2013; EU: November 29, 2013; AU: November 29, 2013; JP: February 22, 2014; PlayStation 4 Slim: WW: September 15, 2016	WW: November 10, 2016	NA: November 22, 2013; EU: November 22, 2013 (select countries only); AU: November 22, 2013; JP: September 4, 2014	NA: August 2, 2016 (select countries only); EU: August 2, 2016 (select countries only); AU: August 2, 2016; JP: November 24, 2016; WW: April 16, 2019; (all digital edition)	WW: November 7, 2017
Launch prices	US$	US$299.99 (equivalent to $420 in 2025) (Note: Deluxe/Premium Model: US$349.99, GBP and € set by retailers, A$428.00, ¥31,500)	US$299.99 (equivalent to $390 in 2025)	US$349.99 (equivalent to $420 in 2025)	PlayStation 4 US$399.99 (equivalent to $550 in 2025) PlayStation 4 Slim; US$299.00 (equivalent to $400 in 2025)	US$399.00 (equivalent to $540 in 2025)	US$499.99 (equivalent to $690 in 2025)	US$299.00 (equivalent to $400 in 2025)	US$499.99 (equivalent to $660 in 2025)
Launch prices	€	Set by retailers	€320 (equivalent to €400 in 2023)	€349 (equivalent to €420 in 2023)	PlayStation 4 €399.00 (equivalent to €490 in 2023) PlayStation 4 Slim €299.99 (equivalent to €370 in 2023)	€399.99 (equivalent to €490 in 2023)	€499 (equivalent to €620 in 2023)	€299 (equivalent to €370 in 2023)	€499.99 (equivalent to €610 in 2023)
Launch prices	GBP	Set by retailers	£279.99 (equivalent to £370 in 2025)	£309.99 (equivalent to £380 in 2025)	PlayStation 4 £349.00 (equivalent to £490 in 2025)	£345.00 (equivalent to £470 in 2025)	£429.00 (equivalent to £600 in 2025)	£249 (equivalent to £340 in 2025)	
Launch prices	A$	A$348.00 (equivalent to $440 in 2022)	A$469.95 (equivalent to $540 in 2022)	A$540.00 (equivalent to $580 in 2022)	PlayStation 4 A$549.00 (equivalent to $680 in 2022)	A$560.00 (equivalent to $650 in 2022)	A$599.00 (equivalent to $740 in 2022)		
Launch prices	JP¥	¥26,250 (equivalent to ¥30,120 in 2024)	¥29,980 (equivalent to ¥33,140 in 2024)	¥52,500 (equivalent to ¥57,090 in 2024)	PlayStation 4 ¥41,979 (equivalent to ¥47,740 in 2024)				
Current prices	US$	Discontinued	US$339.99	US$399.99	Same as launch prices	Discontinued	Discontinued		
Current prices	€	Discontinued	Same as launch prices		Same as launch prices	Discontinued	Discontinued		
Current prices	GBP	Discontinued	Same as launch prices		Same as launch prices	Discontinued	Discontinued		
Current prices	A$	Discontinued	Same as launch prices		Same as launch prices	Discontinued	Discontinued		
Current prices	JP¥	Discontinued	¥43,980	¥47,980	Same as launch prices	Discontinued	Discontinued		
Discontinued		January 31, 2017	In production (Note: All models will be discontinued in Europe by mid-February 2027. In production in all other markets.)		Japan: March 28, 2024	Japan: January 5, 2021	August 25, 2017	Q4 2020 (All-Digital version discontinued on July 16, 2020)	July 16, 2020
Sales	Shipped	13.56 million (as of December 31, 2016)	156.59 million (all models) (Note: Nintendo Switch: 97.75 million, Switch Lite: 26.61 million, OLED model: 32.23 million) (as of June 30, 2026)		117.2 million (as of March 31, 2022)		58 million (as of June 30, 2023)		
Sales	Sold	Not reported	Not reported		113.5 million (as of September 30, 2020)		58 million (as of June 30, 2023)		
Sales	Best-selling game	Mario Kart 8, 8.46 million (as of March 31, 2023)	Mario Kart 8 Deluxe, 71.53 million (as of June 30, 2026)		God of War (2018), 19.50 million (as of October 20, 2021)		PlayerUnknown's Battlegrounds, 8.00 million (as of July 4, 2018)		
Sales	Best-selling game	List of best-selling Wii U video games	List of best-selling Nintendo Switch video games		List of best-selling PlayStation 4 video games		List of best-selling Xbox One video games		
Media	Game media	Wii U Optical Disc (25 GB) (5x CAV)	Nintendo Switch game card (1-32 GB)		Blu-ray (25/50 GB) (6x CAV)		Blu-ray (25/50/66/100 GB)		
Media	Other	Wii Optical Disc (4.7/8.5 GB) (6x CAV)	—N/a		Blu-ray, DVD		Blu-ray, DVD, CD	Ultra HD Blu-ray, Blu-ray, DVD, CD	
Media	Regional lockout	Region locked	Unrestricted		Almost fully Only DLC is region locked		Unrestricted		
Media	Backward compatibility	Wii (Note: Supports Wii software on disc and downloaded from Wii Shop Channel. Games from previous generations available for digital purchase and download via Virtual Console on Nintendo eShop.)	Partial (Note: Select games from previous generations are available for digital purchase and download on Nintendo's eShop. This is limited to games published by third parties, or specifically ported to the Nintendo Switch. No Virtual Console system exists, and no legacy games purchased on previous consoles may be transferred to the Nintendo Switch, as they could be from the Wii to the Wii U.)		Partial (Note: PlayStation Now cloud support for selected PlayStation 3 games began in January 2015 for North America. Subscription required.)		Partial (Note: Select Xbox 360 and Xbox games; Requires download of digital version of game at no additional charge to existing owners of the game.)		
CPU	Type	Tri-Core IBM PowerPC Espresso	Quad-core ARM Cortex-A57, quad-core ARM Cortex-A53 (Note: The central processing unit is composed of two quad-core modules.)		Octa-core AMD Jaguar-based		Octa-core AMD Jaguar-based		
CPU	ISA	PowerPC	ARMv8-A		x86-64				
CPU	Clock speed	1.24 GHz	1.02 GHz		1.60 GHz	2.13 GHz	1.75 GHz		2.30 GHz
CPU	L1 cache	192 kB (Note: 64 kB per core (32 kB for instructions and 32 kB for data).)	576 kB (Note: The quad-core ARM Cortex-A57 cluster has a total of 320 kB of L1 cache, distributed by 80 kB per each core (48 kB for instructions and 32 kB for data). The quad-core ARM Cortex-A53 cluster has a total of 256 kB of L1 cache, distributed by 64 kB per each core (32 kB for instructions and 32 kB for data).)		512 kB		512 kB		
CPU	L2 cache	3 MB eDRAM @ 1.24 GHz (CPU) (159.1 GB/s) (Note: Cores 0 and 2 have 512 kB of L2 cache each, while core 1 has 2 MB.)	2.5 MB (Note: The quad-core ARM Cortex-A57 cluster has 2 MB of shared L2 cache. The quad-core ARM Cortex-A53 cluster has 512 kB of shared L2 cache.)		4 MB (Note: 2 MB of L2 cache per quad-core module.)		4 MB		
CPU	L3 cache	32 MB eDRAM @ 550 MHz (70.4 GB/s) (Note: The 32 MB eDRAM module is located off the central processing unit (CPU) die and is in the graphics processing unit (GPU), running at the GPU's clock speed.)	—N/a		—N/a		32 MB eSRAM @ 853 MHz (204 GB/s) (Note: The 32 MB eSRAM module is located off the central processing unit (CPU) die and is in the graphics processing unit (GPU), running at the GPU's clock speed.)	32 MB eSRAM @ 914 MHz (219 GB/s)	—N/a
CPU	L3 cache	3 MB eSRAM (Note: Reserved for Wii backward compatibility.)	—N/a		—N/a		32 MB eSRAM @ 853 MHz (204 GB/s)	32 MB eSRAM @ 914 MHz (219 GB/s)	—N/a
CPU	Process	45 nm	20 nm (Note: Consoles manufactured after August 2019 featured chips made on the 16nm process, improving battery life and performance. These consoles were shipped featuring slightly different boxes those manufactured before August, but Nintendo has not otherwise differentiated between the two models.)	16 nm	PlayStation 4; 28 nm PlayStation 4 Slim; 16 nm	16 nm	28 nm	16 nm	
CPU	Secondary	ARM9 processor (for background tasks)	—N/a		ARM processor (for background tasks)	—N/a	—N/a		
GPU	Type	AMD Radeon-based "Latte"	Nvidia GM20B Maxwell-based		AMD Radeon-based "Liverpool"	AMD Radeon-based "Neo"	AMD Radeon-based "Durango"		AMD Radeon-based "Scorpio Engine"
GPU	Clock speed	550 MHz	307.2-768 MHz (Note: When docked, the graphics processing unit (GPU) can run at from 307.2 to 768 MHz (capable of 0.157 to 0.393 TFLOP/s, respectively). When undocked, the GPU can run at from 307.2 to 460 MHz (capable of 0.157 to 0.236 TFLOP/s, respectively).)	800 MHz	800 MHz	911 MHz	853 MHz	914 MHz	1,172 MHz
GPU	Stream processors	320	256		1152	2304	768		2560
GPU	TFLOP/s	0.352	0.157-0.393		1.843	4.198	1.310	1.404	6.001
GPU	TMUs	16	16		72	144	48		160
GPU	Texture rate	8.8 GTexel/s	4.9-12.3 GTexel/s		57.6 GTexel/s	131.2 GTexel/s	40.9 GTexel/s	43.8 GTexel/s	187.5 GTexel/s
GPU	ROPs	8	16		32	64	16		32
GPU	Pixel rate	4.4 GPixel/s	4.9-12.3 GPixel/s		25.6 GPixel/s	29.15 GPixel/s	13.6 GPixel/s	14.6 GPixel/s	37.5 GPixel/s
GPU	Compute units	5	2		18	36	12		40
GPU	Process	40 nm	20 nm		PlayStation 4; 28 nm PlayStation 4 Slim; 16 nm	16 nm	28 nm	16 nm	
Memory	Main	2 GB DDR3 SDRAM	4 GB LPDDR4 SDRAM		8 GB GDDR5 SDRAM	8 GB GDDR5 SDRAM	8 GB DDR3 SDRAM		12 GB GDDR5 SDRAM
Memory	Clock speed	800 MHz (1600 MHz effective)	1600 MHz (3200 MHz effective)	1700 MHz (6800 MHz effective)	1375 MHz (5500 MHz effective)	1700 MHz (6800 MHz effective)	1066.5 MHz (2133 MHz effective)		1700 MHz (6800 MHz effective)
Memory	Bandwidth	12.8 GB/s	25.6 GB/s		176.0 GB/s	217.6 GB/s	68.3 GB/s		326.4 GB/s
Memory	Reserved	1 GB	1 GB		3.5 GB		3 GB		
Memory	Secondary	—N/a	—N/a		256 MB DDR3 RAM	1 GB DDR3 RAM	—N/a		
Storage	Internal	8 GB/32 GB eMMC flash memory (non-replaceable); 1 GB flash memory (reserved for the OS)	32 GB eMMC NAND flash memory (non-replaceable)	64 GB eMMC NAND flash memory (non-replaceable)	500 GB HDD or 1 TB HDD (user replaceable)	1 TB HDD or 2 TB (user replaceable)	500 GB HDD, 1 TB HDD (non-replaceable); 8 GB flash memory (reserved for the OS)	500 GB HDD, 1 TB HDD, 2 TB HDD (non-replaceable); 8 GB flash memory (reserved for the OS)	1 TB HDD, (non-replaceable); 8 GB flash memory (reserved for the OS)
Storage	External	Supports up to 32 GB SDHC cards Supports up to 2 TB USB HDD (Wii U Mode only)	Supports microSD/microSDHC/microSDXC up to 2 TB		Supports USB HDD over 240 GB up to 8 TB (with System Software 4.50 or higher)		Supports USB 3.0 HDD larger than 256 GB up to 16 TB		
Storage	Game Installation	Only downloaded games can be installed to storage	Downloaded games can be installed to internal memory or SD card		All games must be installed to a connected HDD		All games must be installed to a connected HDD		
Network	Wireless	802.11 a/b/g/n Wi-Fi @ 2.4 GHz; 802.11n Wi-Fi @ 5.0 GHz (Note: Reserved for connecting with the Wii U GamePad.)	802.11 a/b/g/n/ac Wi-Fi @ 2.4 and 5.0 GHz		PlayStation 4; 802.11b/g/n Wi-Fi @ 2.4 GHz PlayStation 4 Slim; 802.11b/g/n/ac Wi-Fi @ 2.4 GHz	802.11a/b/g/n/ac Wi-Fi 2.4 GHz/5 GHz	802.11a/b/g/n dual-band Wi-Fi @ 2.4 GHz and 5.0 GHz	802.11a/b/g/n/ac dual-band Wi-Fi @ 2.4 GHz and 5.0 GHz	
Network	Wired	Fast Ethernet (Note: A LAN adapter accessory is required.)	Fast Ethernet (Note: A LAN adapter accessory is required.)	Gigabit Ethernet	Gigabit Ethernet		Gigabit Ethernet		
Dimensions		When lying down on its side: Width: 172 mm (6.7 in); Height: 46 mm (1.8 in); Length: 268.5 mm (10.5 in) (can be oriented vertically using a stand)	Console laying flat: Width: 102 mm (4.0 in); Height: 13.9 mm (0.55 in); Length: 203.1 mm (8.00 in) (Console only); 239 mm (9.4 in) (Joy-Con attached) (must be oriented vertically)	Console laying flat: Width: 102 mm (4.0 in); Height: 13.9 mm (0.55 in); Length: 203.1 mm (8.00 in) (Console only); 239 mm (9.4 in) (Joy-Con attached) (must be oriented vertically)	PlayStation 4 When lying down on its side: Width: 275 mm (10.8 in); Height: 53 mm (2.0 in); Length: 305 mm (12.0 in) (can be oriented vertically using a stand) PlayStation 4 Slim; When lying down on its side: Width: 265 mm (10.4 in); Height: 39 mm (1.5 in); Length: 288 mm (11.3 in) (can be oriented vertically using a stand)	When lying down on its side: Width: 295 mm (11.6 in); Height: 55 mm (2.2 in); Length: 327 mm (12.9 in) (can be oriented vertically using a stand)	When lying down on its side: Width: 309 mm (12.1 in); Height: 83 mm (3.2 in); Length: 258 mm (10.1 in) (must be oriented horizontally)	When lying down on its side: Width: 295 mm (11.6 in); Height: 64 mm (2.5 in); Length: 227 mm (8.9 in) (can be oriented vertically using a stand)	When lying down on its side: Width: 300 mm (11.8 in); Height: 60 mm (2.4 in); Length: 240 mm (9.4 in) (can be oriented vertically using a stand)
Weight		1.5 kg (3.3 lb)	0.297 kg (0.65 lb) (Console only); 0.398 kg (0.88 lb) (Joy-Con attached)	0.319 kg (0.70 lb) (Console only); 0.420 kg (0.93 lb) (Joy-Con attached)	PlayStation 4; 2.8 kg (6.2 lb) PlayStation 4 Slim; 2.1 kg (4.6 lb)	3.3 kg (7.3 lb)	3.2 kg (7.1 lb)	2.9 kg (6.4 lb)	3.8 kg (8.4 lb)
Power		75 W (external power supply)	4,310 mAh, 3.7 V lithium-ion battery Max. 39 W (external power supply)		PlayStation 4 Max. 223 W (internal power supply) PlayStation 4 Slim; Max. 163 W (internal power supply)	Max. 289 W (internal power supply) (PSU) Max. 310 W (internal power supply) (Product Page)	Max. 220 W (external power supply)	Max. 125 W (internal power supply)	Max. 245 W (internal power supply)
Included accessories		All Models: Wii U GamePad; Stylus; Wii Sensor Bar; HDMI cable; Deluxe/Premium Model only: Wii U GamePad stand; Wii U GamePad charging cradle; Wii U console stand	Two Joy-Con controllers (L and R); Two Joy-Con straps; Joy-Con Grip; Switch Dock; HDMI cable		DualShock 4 controller; Micro-USB cable (for charging DualShock 4); Wired mono headset; HDMI cable		Xbox Wireless Controller; Kinect sensor (in some bundles); Wired mono headset; HDMI cable	Xbox Wireless Controller; Wired mono headset; HDMI cable	
Video	Output	1080p, 1080i, 720p, 480p: HDMI out 1.4b; Component video; YP_{B}P_{R} (D-Terminal out Japan only); 576i, 480i (standard 4:3 and 16:9 anamorphic widescreen): Composite video; S-Video (NTSC consoles only); RGB SCART (PAL consoles only); D-Terminal (Japanese consoles only)	720p (undocked): Via 6.2-inch, 1280 × 720p LCD screen @ 237 ppi; 1080p, 720p and 480p (docked): HDMI out 1.4b	720p (undocked): Via 7-inch, 1280 × 720p OLED screen @ 210 ppi; 1080p, 720p and 480p (docked): HDMI out 2.0a	1080p, 1080i, 720p, and 480p: HDR10; HDMI out 1.4b	4K 2160p, 1080p, 1080i, 720p, and 480p: HDR10; HDMI out 2.0a	1080p, 720p, and 480p: HDMI in/out 1.4b	4K 2160p, 1440p, 1080p, 720p, and 480p: HDR10; Dolby Vision; HDMI out 2.0a (Xbox One S); HDMI out 2.0b (Xbox One X); HDMI in 1.4b; AMD FreeSync support	
Video	Integrated 3DTV support	Yes	No		Yes		Yes		
Video	Second screen	Wii U GamePad (bundled with console)	—N/a		PlayStation Vita; PlayStation App on iOS and Android devices		Xbox Console Companion on Android, iOS, Windows 8, Windows 8.1, Windows 10, Windows Phone		
Video	Remote	Local game streaming via Off-TV Play to Wii U GamePad for some games	—N/a		Local and remote game streaming via Remote Play to PS Vita, macOS and Windows, or selected Sony Xperia smartphone for all games, except those that require the PS Camera or PS Move		Local game streaming via Xbox App to Windows 10 PC		
Audio		5.1 LPCM output via HDMI; Analog stereo via "AV Multi Out" port; Stereo speakers on Wii U GamePad; Stereo output via 3.5mm jack on Wii U GamePad	5.1 LPCM output via HDMI; Stereo speakers on Console; Stereo output via 3.5mm jack on Console		7.1 LPCM and bitstreaming output via HDMI; 5.1 LPCM and bitstreaming output via optical out; Stereo output via 3.5mm jack on DualShock 4; Mono speaker on DualShock 4		7.1 LPCM and bitstreaming output via HDMI; 2.0 LPCM and bitstreaming output via optical out; Internal system speaker; Stereo output via extension port on controller (requires adapter for 3.5 mm jacks) and via 3.5 mm jack port (present only on 2nd and 3rd controller revisions)		
Peripheral abilities		Bluetooth 4.0; HDMI (1 out port); "AV Multi Out" port; 4 USB 2.0 ports (2 at front of console, 2 at rear); Sensor Bar power port; Near Field Communication (NFC)	Bluetooth 4.1; HDMI (1 out port on dock); 1 USB 3.0 port (on dock); 2 USB 2.0 ports (on dock); 1 USB-C port (on Console); Near Field Communication (NFC)	Bluetooth 4.1; HDMI (1 out port on dock); 1 LAN port (on dock); 2 USB 2.0 ports (on dock); 1 USB-C port (on Console); Near Field Communication (NFC)	Bluetooth 2.1 + EDR (PlayStation 4) or Bluetooth 4.0 (LE) (PlayStation 4 Slim); HDMI (1 out port); 2 USB 3.0 ports (at front of console); PS Camera AUX port; Optical out port; Ethernet port	Bluetooth 4.0 (LE); HDMI (1 out port); 3 USB 3.1 (gen 1) ports; PS Camera AUX port; Optical out port; Ethernet port	Wi-Fi Direct; 2 HDMI (1 in port and 1 out port); 3 USB 3.0 ports (1 at side of console, 2 at rear); Kinect port; Optical out port; Ethernet port	IR Blaster; Bluetooth 4.0; 2 HDMI (1 in port and 1 out port); 3 USB 3.0 ports (1 at front of console, 2 at rear); Optical out port; S/PDIF; Ethernet port	
Controller		Wii U GamePad; Wii U Pro Controller (up to 7); Wii Remote/Plus (up to 7); Nunchuk attachment; Classic Controller attachment; Wii Balance Board; Nintendo 3DS (select games only); Nintendo GameCube controller (adapter required, only supports Super Smash Bros. for Wii U)	Joy-Con controller (up to 8); Nintendo Switch Pro Controller (up to 8); Nintendo GameCube controller (since version 4.0, adapter required)		DualShock 4 controller (up to 4); PlayStation Move; PlayStation Camera; PlayStation Vita (select games only)		Xbox Wireless Controller (up to 8); Xbox Series X controller; Kinect; Computer mouse (select games only); Computer keyboard (select games only); Amazon Alexa (voice controls only)		
Touch capability		Wii U GamePad includes an integrated resistive touchscreen	Console includes multi-touch capacitive touchscreen		DualShock 4 controller includes an integrated 2 point capacitive touchpad		—N/a		
Camera		Wii U GamePad camera (bundled with all consoles)	—N/a		PlayStation Camera		Kinect	Kinect (adapter required to use)	
Online services	Network	Nintendo Network (discontinued): Nintendo eShop (discontinued); Miiverse (discontinued); Nintendo TVii (discontinued)	Nintendo Switch Online: Nintendo eShop		PlayStation Network: PlayStation Store; PlayStation Now; PlayStation Music; PlayStation Video; PlayMemories Online; PlayStation Vue		Xbox Live: Microsoft Store; Microsoft Movies & TV		
Online services	Downloads	Downloads games and automatic updates in the background via SpotPass	Downloads automatic updates in the background		Downloads games and automatic updates in the background		Downloads games and automatic updates in the background		
Online services	Subscription	Free	Paid Nintendo Switch Online subscription required for online multiplayer, except for free-to-play titles		Paid PlayStation Plus subscription required for online multiplayer and cloud saves except for free-to-play titles		Paid Xbox Live Gold subscription required for online multiplayer, except for free-to-play titles free cloud saves		
Game DVR	Image	Screenshots with Miiverse integration (can be shared to Facebook, Twitter, Google Plus and Tumblr)	Screenshots with Facebook and Twitter integration		Screenshots with Twitter integration		Screenshots with Twitter integration		
Game DVR	Video	Gameplay replays with YouTube integration (select games only)	Up to 30 seconds of gameplay with Facebook and Twitter integration		Up to 1 hour of gameplay with Dailymotion, Facebook, Twitter and YouTube integration; 720p for all PS4 models, 1080p for PS4 Pro		Up to 5 minutes of gameplay; 1080p for all Xbox One models, 4K for Xbox One X (external storage required)		
Game DVR	Live streaming	—N/a	—N/a		Live streaming with Dailymotion, Twitch, Ustream and YouTube Gaming integration		Live streaming with Mixer and Twitch integration		
Game DVR	Live streaming	Free	Free		Free		Paid subscription to Xbox Live Gold required		
List of games		List of Wii U games	List of Nintendo Switch games		List of PlayStation 4 games		List of Xbox One games		
System software	OS	Wii U system software	Nintendo Switch system software		PlayStation 4 system software		Xbox One system software		
System software	Updates	Updates are downloaded and installed automatically in Standby Mode	Automatic updates can be enabled by turning on Automatic Software Updates in System Settings		Updates are downloaded and installed automatically in Rest Mode		Updates are downloaded and installed automatically in Instant-on Mode		

== Handheld systems ==
A trend starting from the eighth generation of handheld systems was the general shift from dedicated handheld gaming consoles to mobile gaming on smart devices, such as smartphones and tablets. As such, smart devices had eroded sales of dedicated handheld gaming consoles, with analysts of the time predicting that smart devices would have replaced handheld gaming consoles.

=== Nintendo 3DS ===
The Nintendo 3DS is a portable game console produced by Nintendo. It is the successor to the Nintendo DS. The autostereoscopic device is able to project stereoscopic 3D effects without the use of 3D glasses or any additional accessories. The Nintendo 3DS features backward compatibility with Nintendo DS series software, including Nintendo DSi software. Announcing the device in March 2010, Nintendo officially unveiled it at E3 2010, with the company inviting attendees to use demonstration units. The console succeeds the Nintendo DS series of handheld systems, which primarily competes with PlayStation Portable. It competes with Sony's handheld, the PlayStation Vita.

The Nintendo 3DS was released in Japan on February 26, 2011; in Europe on March 25, 2011; in North America on March 27, 2011; and in Australia on March 31, 2011. On July 28, 2011, Nintendo announced a major price drop starting August 12. In addition, as of September 2011 consumers who bought the system at its original price have access to ten Nintendo Entertainment System games before they are available to the general public, after which the games may be updated to the versions publicly released on the Nintendo eShop. In December 2011, ten Game Boy Advance games were made available to consumers who bought the system at its original price at no charge, with Nintendo stating it has no plans to release to the general public.

On June 21, 2012, Nintendo announced a bigger model of the 3DS called the Nintendo 3DS XL. Both screens are 90% larger than the original 3DS, but the resolution is the same. It also has a slightly longer battery life. It was released on July 28, 2012, in Europe and August 19, 2012, in North America as well as Australasia on August 23, 2012, and Brazil on September 1, 2012.

On August 28, 2013, Nintendo announced a low cost, 2D version of the 3DS called the Nintendo 2DS. This redesign plays all Nintendo DS and Nintendo 3DS games, albeit without a stereoscopic 3D option. Unlike previous machines of the DS family, the Nintendo 2DS uses a slate-like design instead of a clamshell one. The console launched on October 12 in both Europe and North America as well as Australasia.

On August 29, 2014, Nintendo announced an enhanced revision of the 3DS called the New Nintendo 3DS and New Nintendo 3DS XL. The newer system uses microSD cards rather than full-sized and has a second analog "nub" input, the C-stick, Super-Stable 3D™ (face-tracking technology that allows the glasses-free stereoscopic 3D display to constantly adapt to the user's exact eye position as the player shifts his or her arms and body) and an upgraded processor that allows for more advanced NN3DS-exclusive games (e.g., a 3D port of acclaimed Wii game Xenoblade Chronicles) which cannot be played on the original Nintendo 3DS/2DS, although New Nintendo 3DS can still be played with all 3DS and most DSi games. It was released in Japan on October 11, 2014; in Australasia on November 21, 2014; in Europe on February 13, 2015; in North America on February 13, 2015, for the XL version. The smaller version for North America was released on September 25, 2015, bundled with the game Animal Crossing: Happy Home Designer. In April 2017, Nintendo announced the New Nintendo 2DS XL, released in Japan on July 13, 2017, and in North America on July 28, 2017. It is a streamlined version of the New Nintendo 3DS XL, with identical screen sizes, but with a thinner build and without stereoscopic 3D.

The Nintendo 3DS/2DS family was formally discontinued on September 16, 2020.

=== PlayStation Vita ===
The PlayStation Vita is the second handheld game console developed by Sony Computer Entertainment. It is the successor to the PlayStation Portable as part of the PlayStation brand of gaming devices. It was released in Japan on December 17, 2011 and was released in Europe and North America on February 22, 2012.

The handheld includes two analog sticks, a 5-inch (130 mm) OLED/LCD multi-touch capacitive touchscreen, and supports Bluetooth, Wi-Fi and optional 3G. Internally, the PS Vita features a 4-core ARM Cortex-A9 MPCore processor and a 4-core SGX543MP4+ graphics processing unit (GPU), as well as LiveArea software as its main user interface, which succeeds the XrossMediaBar.

The device is backward-compatible with a subset of the PSP and PS One games digitally released on the PlayStation Network via the PlayStation Store. The graphics for PSP releases are upscaled, with a smoothing filter to reduce pixelation.

Lifetime sales of the Vita have not been released by Sony, but have been estimated about 16 million units by September 20, 2018.

Sony discontinued the PlayStation Vita on March 1, 2019, and has no plans for a successor.

=== Nintendo Switch Lite ===
Nintendo released the Nintendo Switch Lite, a hardware revision of the Switch, on September 20, 2019. Designed as a less expensive version of the Switch, the Switch Lite integrates the Joy-Con onto the hardware unit itself, eliminating some of the Joy-Con's features, which prevents a small number of games in the Switch's library that exclusively require television or tabletop modes from being used on the Switch. Additionally, the Switch Lite cannot be docked. The unit is smaller and lighter than the main Switch console, and uses updated lower-powered hardware that improves its battery performance. It otherwise supports all other features of the Switch, including its communication capabilities.

=== Handheld comparison ===
Product line	Nintendo 3DS family			PlayStation Vita	Nintendo Switch
Console	Nintendo 3DS/ Nintendo 3DS XL	Nintendo 2DS	New Nintendo 3DS / New Nintendo 3DS XL / New Nintendo 2DS XL	PS Vita	Nintendo Switch Lite
Logo					
Manufacturer	Nintendo			Sony Computer Entertainment	Nintendo
Image			New Nintendo 3DS New Nintendo 3DS XL New Nintendo 2DS XL		Nintendo Switch Lite representation
Release dates	Nintendo 3DS: JP: February 26, 2011; EU: March 25, 2011; NA: March 27, 2011; AU: March 31, 2011; KOR: April 28, 2012; Nintendo 3DS XL: JP: July 28, 2012; EU: July 28, 2012; NA: August 19, 2012; AU: August 23, 2012; KOR: September 20, 2012	EU: October 12, 2013; NA: October 12, 2013; AU: October 12, 2013; KOR: December 2013; JP: February 27, 2016	New Nintendo 3DS: JP: October 11, 2014; AU: November 20, 2014; EU: January 6, 2015 (Ambassador Edition); EU: February 13, 2015 (General release); NA: September 25, 2015; New Nintendo 3DS XL: JP: October 11, 2014; AU: November 20, 2014; EU: February 13, 2015; NA: February 13, 2015; New Nintendo 2DS XL: AU: June 15, 2017; JP: July 13, 2017; KOR: July 13, 2017; NA: July 28, 2017; EU: July 28, 2017	PCH-1000: JP: December 17, 2011; EU: February 22, 2012; NA: February 22, 2012; AU: February 23, 2012; PCH-2000: JP: October 10, 2013; EU: February 7, 2014; NA: May 6, 2014	WW: September 20, 2019
Launch prices	Nintendo 3DS: ¥25,000; US$249.99; £/€, set by individual retailers; A$349.95; Nintendo 3DS XL: ¥18,900; US$199.99; £/€, set by individual retailers; A$249.90	US$129.99; £/€, set by individual retailers; A$149.95	New Nintendo 3DS: ¥16,000; A$219.95; £/€, set by individual retailers; New Nintendo 3DS XL: ¥18,900; A$249.95; £/€, set by individual retailers; US$199.99; New Nintendo 2DS XL: US$149.99; A$199.95	Wi-Fi+3G: ¥29,980; US$299; €299; £279.99; A$419.95; Wi-Fi: ¥24,980; US$249; €249; £229.99; A$349.95; PCH-2000: ¥19,929; £180	US$199.99
Current prices	Nintendo 3DS: ¥15,000; US$169.99; £/€, set by individual retailers; A$249.99			Wi-Fi / Wi-Fi+3G: ¥19,980; US$199.99; €199; £, set by individual retailers; A$269.95	US$229.99
Discontinued	January 5, 2015	September 16, 2020	New Nintendo 3DS: July 13, 2017 New Nintendo 3DS XL: July 25, 2019; New Nintendo 2DS XL: September 16, 2020	March 1, 2019	In production (Note: All models will be discontinued in Europe by mid-February 2027. In production in all other markets.)
Units shipped	75.94 million (as of September 30, 2020)			—N/a (Note: Estimated to had sold about 16 million units.)	26.61 million (as of June 30, 2026)
Best-selling game	Mario Kart 7, 18.99 million units (as of March 31, 2023)			Uncharted: Golden Abyss, 500,000 units (as of June 3, 2012)	Mario Kart 8 Deluxe, 71.53 million units (as of June 30, 2026)
Regional lockout	Region locked			No region lock	No region lock
Backward compatibility	Nintendo DS / Nintendo DSi			PlayStation Portable (digitally downloaded games only)	—N/a
Display	Top Screen: Autostereoscopic (3D) LCD; Screen size: 3DS: 3.53 in (90 mm); 3DS XL: 4.88 in (124 mm); Screen pixel: 3DS/3DS XL: 800 × 240 px (400 × 240 px per eye in 3D); Bottom Screen: 2D LCD resistive touchscreen; Screen size: 3DS: 3.02 in (77 mm); 3DS XL: 4.18 in (106 mm); 320 × 240 px QVGA	Top Screen: 2D LCD; Screen size: 3.53 in (90 mm); Screen pixel: 400 × 240 px; Bottom Screen: 2D LCD resistive touchscreen; Screen size: 3.02 in (77 mm); 320 × 240 px QVGA	Top Screen: Autostereoscopic (3D) LCD (New 3DS, New 3DS XL only); 2D LCD (New 2DS XL only); Screen size: New 3DS: 3.88 in (99 mm); New 3DS XL: 4.88 in (124 mm); New 2DS XL: 4.88 in (124 mm); Screen pixel: New 3DS/New 3DS XL: 800 × 240 px (400 × 240 px per eye in 3D); New 2DS XL: 400 × 240 px; Bottom Screen: 2D LCD resistive touchscreen; Screen size: New 3DS: 3.33 in (85 mm); New 3DS XL: 4.18 in (106 mm); New 2DS XL: 4.18 in (106 mm); 320 × 240 px QVGA	PCH-1000: 5 in (130 mm) OLED capactive touchscreen 960 × 544 px PCH-2000: 5 in (130 mm) IPS LCD capacitive touchscreen 960 × 544 px	2D LCD; 5.5 in (140 mm); 1280 × 720 px
Display	Approximately 16.77 million colors			Approximately 16.77 million colors	Approximately 16.77 million colors
Display	5 brightness levels			0-100% brightness levels	0-100% brightness levels
Autostereoscopy (3D)	Yes; Yes, with 'Super Stable 3D' technology	No	Yes (New 3DS, New 3DS XL only); No (New 2DS XL only)	No	No
CPU	Dual-core ARM11 MPCore & Dual-core VFP Co-Processor		Quad-core ARM11 MPCore & Quad-core VFP Co-Processor	Quad-core ARM Cortex-A9 MPCore	Quad-core Cortex-A57 + quad-core Cortex-A53 @ 1.02 GHz
GPU	Digital Media Professionals PICA200			PowerVR SGX543MP4+	Nvidia GM20B Maxwell-based GPU
RAM	128 MB FCRAM, 6 MB VRAM		256 MB FCRAM, 10 MB VRAM	512 MB RAM, 128 MB VRAM	4 GB LPDDR4
Camera	One front-facing and a set of two rear-facing 3D 0.3 MP (VGA) camera sensors			Front and rear 0.3 MP (VGA) camera sensors	—N/a
Audio	Stereo speakers (2) (with pseudo-surround support); Mono speaker (1) (2DS only); Headphone jack			Stereo speakers (2); Headphone jack	Stereo speakers (2); Headphone jack
Storage	1 GB internal flash memory			1 GB internal flash memory (PCH-2000 only)	32 GB eMMC
Storage	Supports up to 32 GB SD/SDHC cards		Supports up to 32 GB microSD/microSDHC cards	Supports 4 GB, 8 GB, 16 GB, 32 GB and 64 GB proprietary removable memory cards	Supports up to 2 TB microSD/HC/XC cards
Storage	2 GB SD card included (3DS only); 4 GB SDHC card included (3DS XL)	4 GB SDHC card included	4 GB microSDHC card included	No external storage included	No external storage included
Media	Nintendo 3DS Game Card (1–8 GB) / Nintendo DS Game Card (8–512 MB); Digital distribution			PlayStation Vita Game Card (2–4 GB); Digital distribution	Nintendo Switch Game Card
User interface	Circle Pad (2× with add-on (3DS/3DS XL only)); D-pad; Autostereoscopic (3D) 15:9(5:3) screen (top screen) (2DS displays 2D only); Resistive 4:3 touchscreen (bottom screen); 3-axis accelerometer and 3-axis gyroscope; Volume slider; 3D depth slider (Not available on 2DS); Front 2D camera and rear 3D camera sensors; Microphone; Wireless communications switch (3DS/3DS XL only); SLEEP switch (2DS only); 12 × buttons (X, Y, A, B, L, R (ZL and ZR with add-on(3DS/3DS XL only)), START, SELECT, HOME, POWER)		Circle Pad; C-Stick; D-pad; Autostereoscopic (3D) 15:9(5:3) screen (top screen) (New 2DS XL displays 2D only); Resistive 4:3 touchscreen (bottom screen); 3-axis accelerometer and 3-axis gyroscope; Volume slider; 3D depth slider (Not available on New 2DS XL); Front 2D camera and rear 3D camera sensors; Microphone; 12 × buttons (X, Y, A, B, L, R ZL, ZR, START, SELECT, HOME, POWER)	2 × analog sticks; D-pad; Capacitive 16:9 touchscreen; Rear touchpad; Sixaxis motion sensing (3-axis accelerometer and 3-axis gyroscope); Three-axis electronic compass; Front & rear 2D camera sensors; Microphone; 12 × buttons (L, R, Start, Select, Home, Volume ±, Power)	2 C-Sticks; 1 D-pad; Capacitive touchscreen; 3-axis accelerometer and 3-axis gyroscope; Volume swivel switch; 13 × buttons (X, Y, A, B, L, ZL, R, ZR, +, -, HOME, SHARE, POWER)
Battery	Nintendo 3DS: 1300 mAh lithium-ion battery; 3DS Mode: 3–5 hours; DS Mode: 5–8 hours; Nintendo 3DS XL: 1750 mAh lithium-ion battery; 3DS Mode: 3.5–6.5 hours; DS Mode: 6–10 hours	1300 mAh lithium-ion battery; 3DS Mode: 3.5–5.5 hours; DS Mode: 6–9 hours	New Nintendo 3DS: 1400 mAh lithium-ion battery; 3DS Mode: 3.5–6 hours; DS Mode: 6.5-10.5 hours; New Nintendo 3DS XL: 1750 mAh lithium-ion battery; 3DS Mode: 3.5–7 hours; DS Mode: 7–12 hours; New Nintendo 2DS XL: 1300 mAh lithium-ion battery; 3DS Mode: 3.5–5.5 hours; DS Mode: 6–9 hours	PCH-1000: 2200 mAh lithium-ion battery; Gameplay: 3–5 hours; Video playback: 5 hours; Music: 9 hours; PCH-2000: 2210 mAh lithium-ion battery; Gameplay: 4–6 hours; Video playback: 6 hours; Music: 10 hours	3570 mAh lithium-ion battery 3–7 hours
Battery	Determined by screen brightness, Wi-Fi, sound volume, and whether 3D is active (3DS models only)			Determined by screen brightness, Wi-Fi, sound volume, and whether 3G is active (3G model only)	Determined by screen brightness, Wi-Fi, and sound volume
Connectivity	Integrated 802.11 b/g Wi-Fi; IR port; NFC for Amiibo support (only on New 3DS/3DS XL; older 3DS series need to use a 3DS NFC reader accessory)			Integrated 802.11 b/g/n Wi-Fi (PCH-1000 model only); Integrated 802.11 b/g/n Wi-Fi (PCH-2000 model only); 3G (3G model only); Bluetooth 2.1 + EDR	Integrated 802.11a/b/g/n/ac Wi-Fi @ 2.4, 5 GHz; Bluetooth 4.1; NFC for Amiibo support
Console Connection	Wii / Wii U			PlayStation 3 / PlayStation 4	—N/a
Stylus	3DS: Extendable up to 100 mm (3.9 in) long 3DS XL: 96 mm (3.8 in) long	96 mm (3.8 in) long	New 3DS: 76.5 mm (3.01 in) long New 3DS XL/New 2DS XL: 86 mm (3.4 in) long	—N/a	—N/a
Weight	3DS: 235 g (8.3 oz); 3DS XL: 336 g (11.9 oz)	260 g (9.2 oz)	New 3DS: 253 g (8.9 oz); New 3DS XL: 329 g (11.6 oz); New 2DS XL: 260 g (9.2 oz)	Wi-Fi: 260 g (9.2 oz); Wi-Fi+3G: 279 g (9.8 oz); PCH-2000: 219 g (7.7 oz)	280 g (9.9 oz)
Dimensions	3DS: Width: 134 mm (5.3 in); Depth: 74 mm (2.9 in); Height: 21 mm (0.83 in); 3DS XL: Width: 156 mm (6.1 in); Depth: 93 mm (3.7 in); Height: 22 mm (0.87 in)	Width: 144 mm (5.7 in); Depth: 127 mm (5.0 in); Height: 20.3 mm (0.80 in)	New 3DS: Width: 156 mm (6.1 in); Depth: 93 mm (3.7 in); Height: 22 mm (0.87 in); New 3DS XL/New 2DS XL: Width: 160 mm (6.3 in); Depth: 93.5 mm (3.68 in); Height: 21.5 mm (0.85 in)	PCH-1000: Width: 182 mm (7.2 in); Depth: 83.6 mm (3.29 in); Height: 18.6 mm (0.73 in); PCH-2000: Width: 183.6 mm (7.23 in); Depth: 85.1 mm (3.35 in); Height: 15 mm (0.59 in)	Width: 208 mm (8.2 in); Depth: 91 mm (3.6 in); Height: 14 mm (0.55 in)
Online services	Nintendo Network: Nintendo eShop; Miiverse (discontinued); Nintendo Video (discontinued); Swapnote (Nintendo Letter Box in PAL region) (discontinued); StreetPass; StreetPass Mii Plaza (local & online players met); SpotPass; Internet Browser			Sony Entertainment Network: PlayStation Network; PlayStation Store; PlayStation Video; PlayStation Music; PlayStation Mobile	Nintendo Switch Online: Nintendo eShop
Online services	Full game download/installation and automatic updates in the background via SpotPass			Full game download/installation in the background	Full game download/installation and automatic updates in the background
Online services	Free			Free	Paid Nintendo Switch Online subscription required for online multiplayer, except for free-to-play titles
Preloaded applications	Applications: Health & Safety Information; Nintendo 3DS Camera (Photo + Video Recording and Editing); Nintendo 3DS Sound; Nintendo eShop; Mii Maker; StreetPass Mii Plaza; AR Games; Face Raiders; Swapnote (Nintendo Letter Box in PAL regions); Nintendo Video; Netflix (w/ paid subscription); Hulu Plus (w/ paid subscription); YouTube; Nintendo Zone; Activity Log; Download Play; System Settings; Multitasking Applications: Game Notes; Friend List; Notifications; Internet Browser; Miiverse			Welcome Park; near; Photos; Music; Videos; PlayStation Store; Trophies; Friends; Party; Group Messaging; Notifications; Internet Browser; Email; Maps; Content Manager; Remote Play; Cross-Controller; Settings	Nintendo eShop
List of games	List of Nintendo 3DS games			List of PlayStation Vita games	List of Nintendo Switch games (Only play games that support handheld mode)
System software	Nintendo 3DS system software			PlayStation Vita system software	Nintendo Switch system software

== See also ==
- 2010s in video games
- List of video game consoles
  - List of home video game consoles
  - List of handheld game consoles
  - List of dedicated video game consoles
  - List of microconsoles
  - List of virtual reality headsets
