= List of microconsoles =

This is a list of microconsoles from the first created to the present, in chronological order. This list may not be complete yet.

The microconsole market started in the seventh generation era of video game consoles, and this market grew during the eighth generation era of gaming consoles.

== List ==
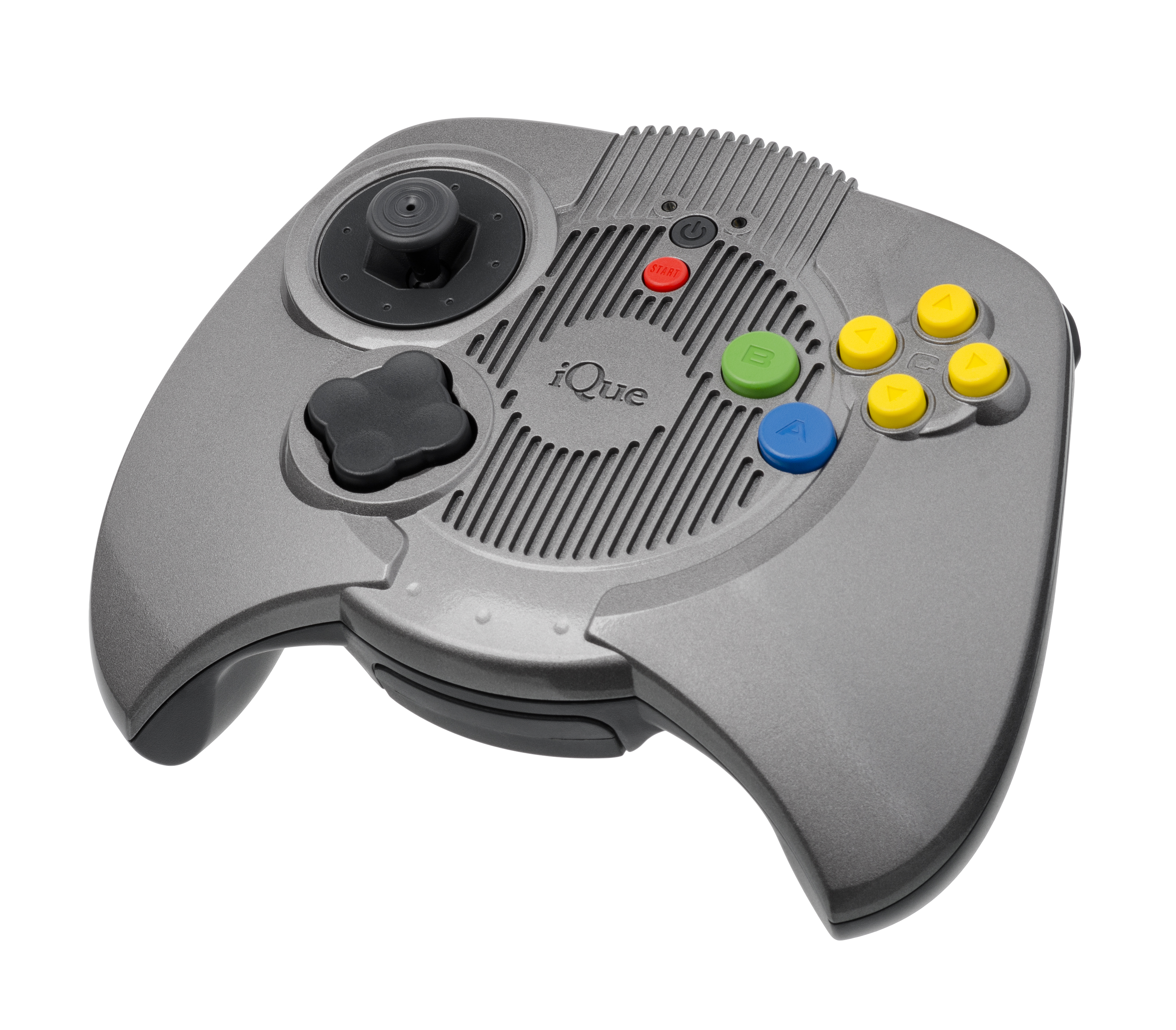
iQue Player (2003) (Note: The iQue Player did not allow users to download games at home until the iQue@Home application store was launched in October 2004.)

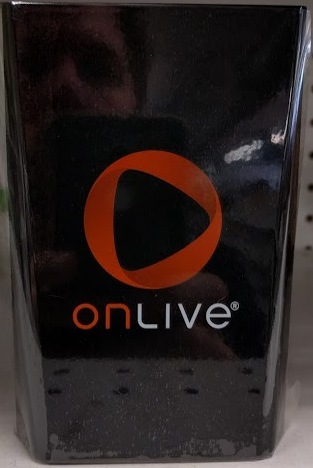
OnLive (2010)

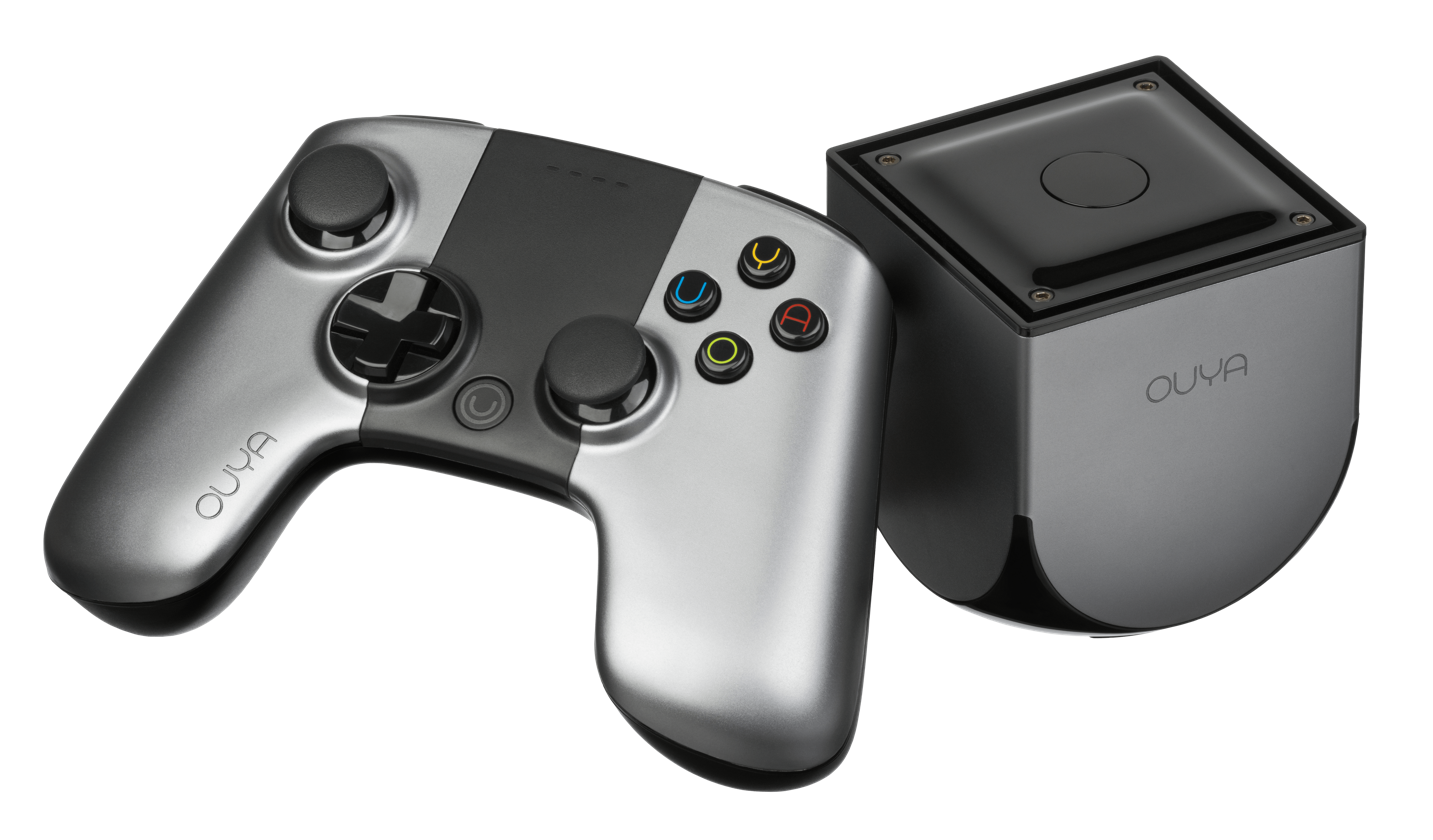
Ouya (2013)

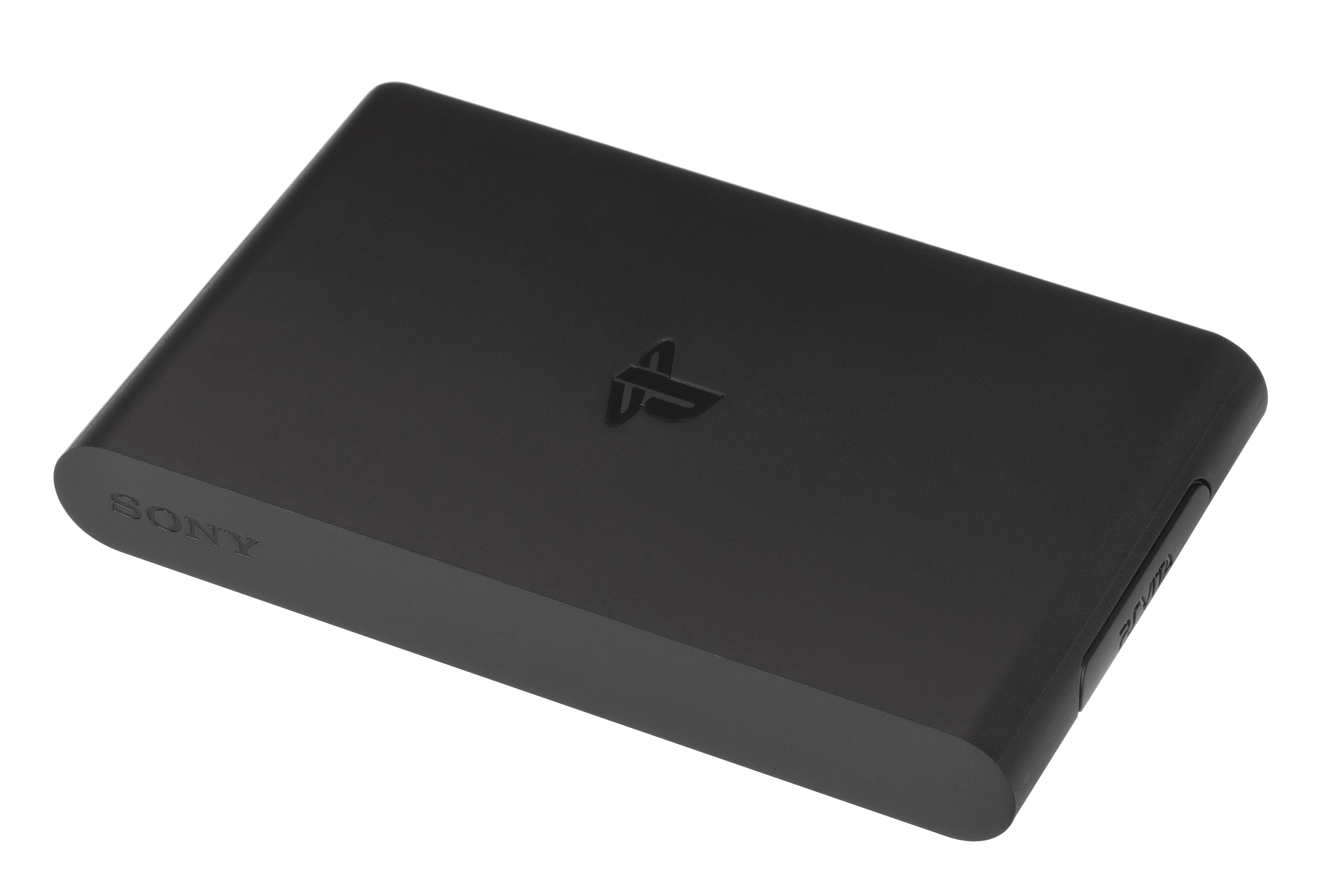
PlayStation TV (2013)

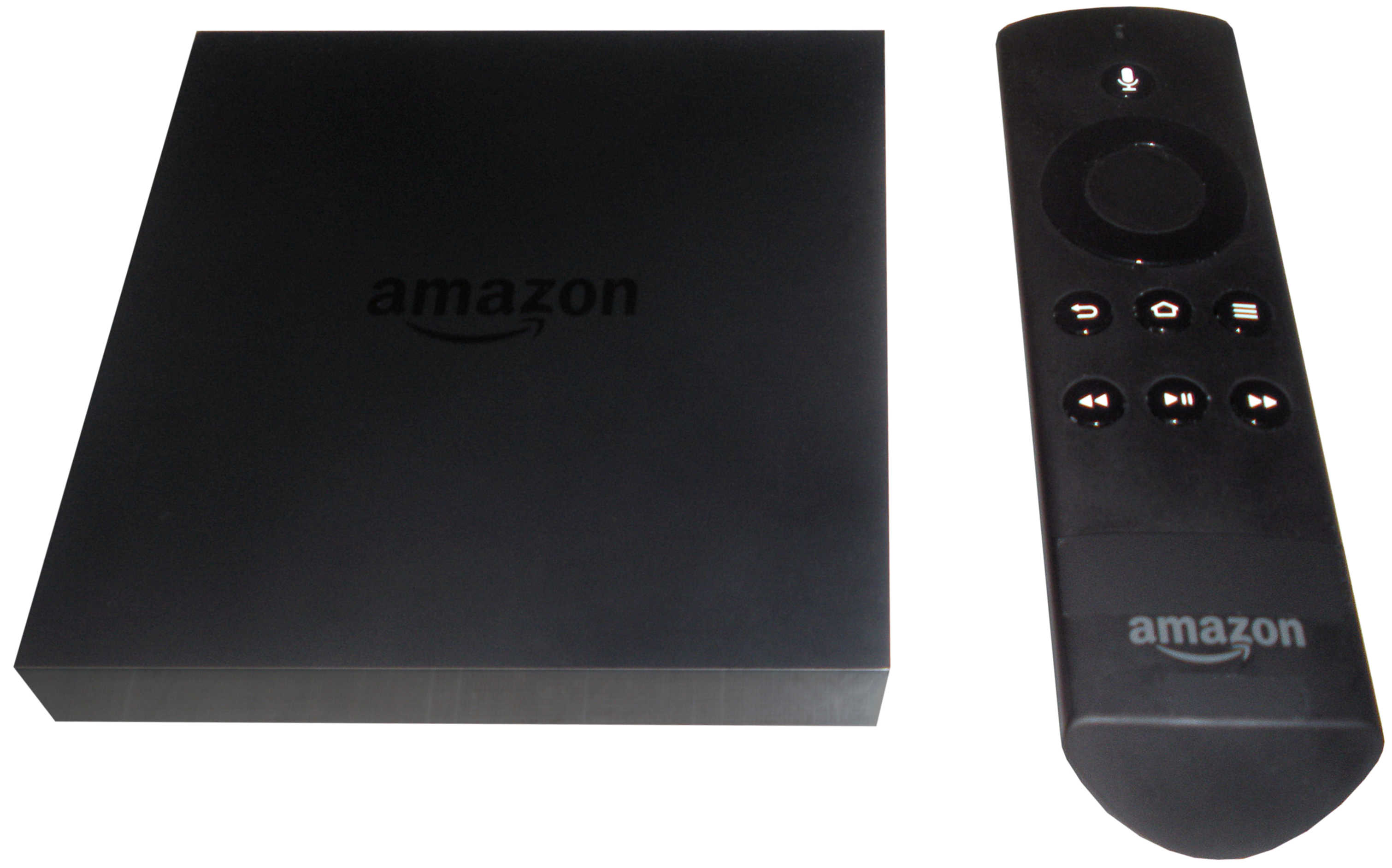
Fire TV (2014)

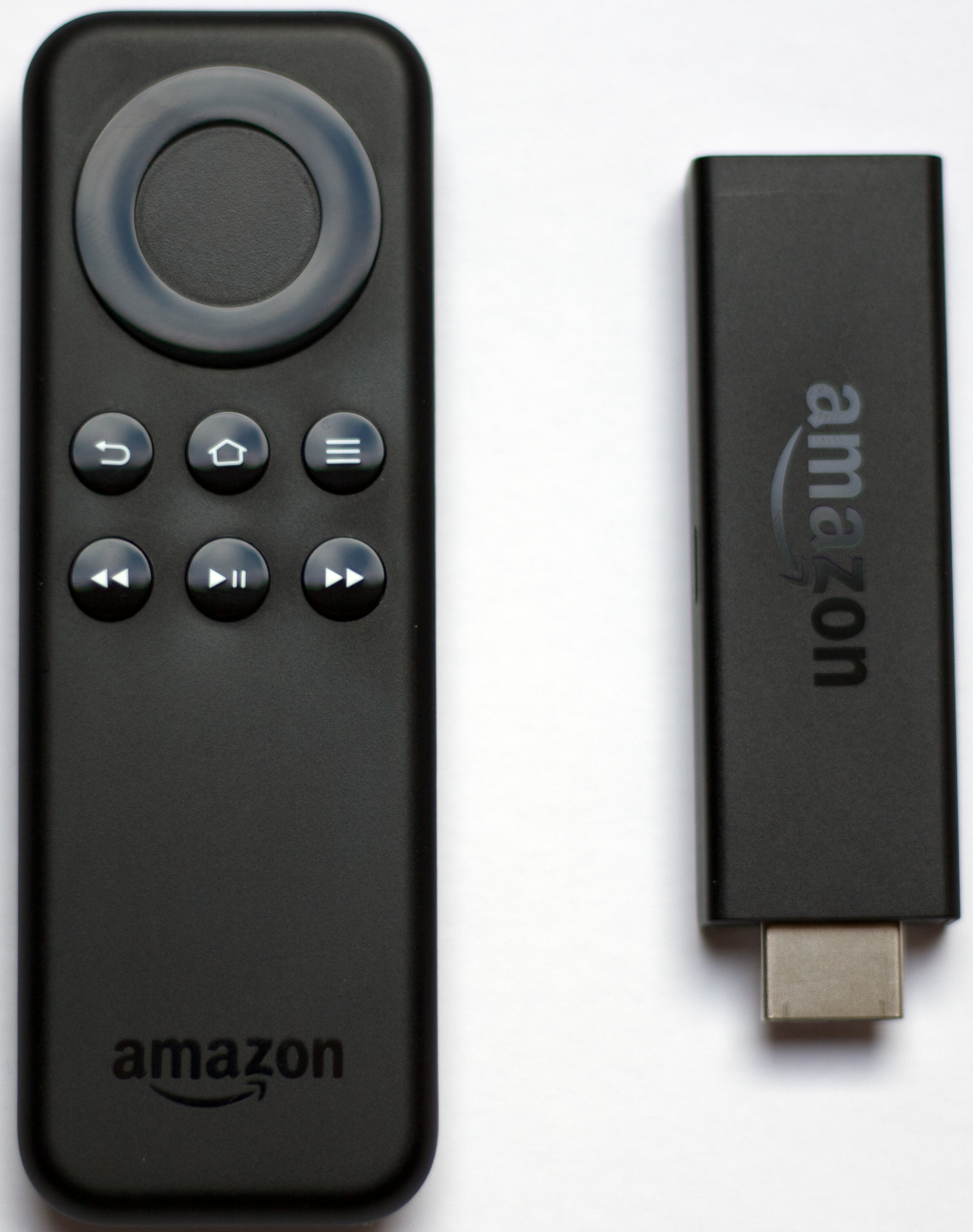
Fire TV Stick (2014)

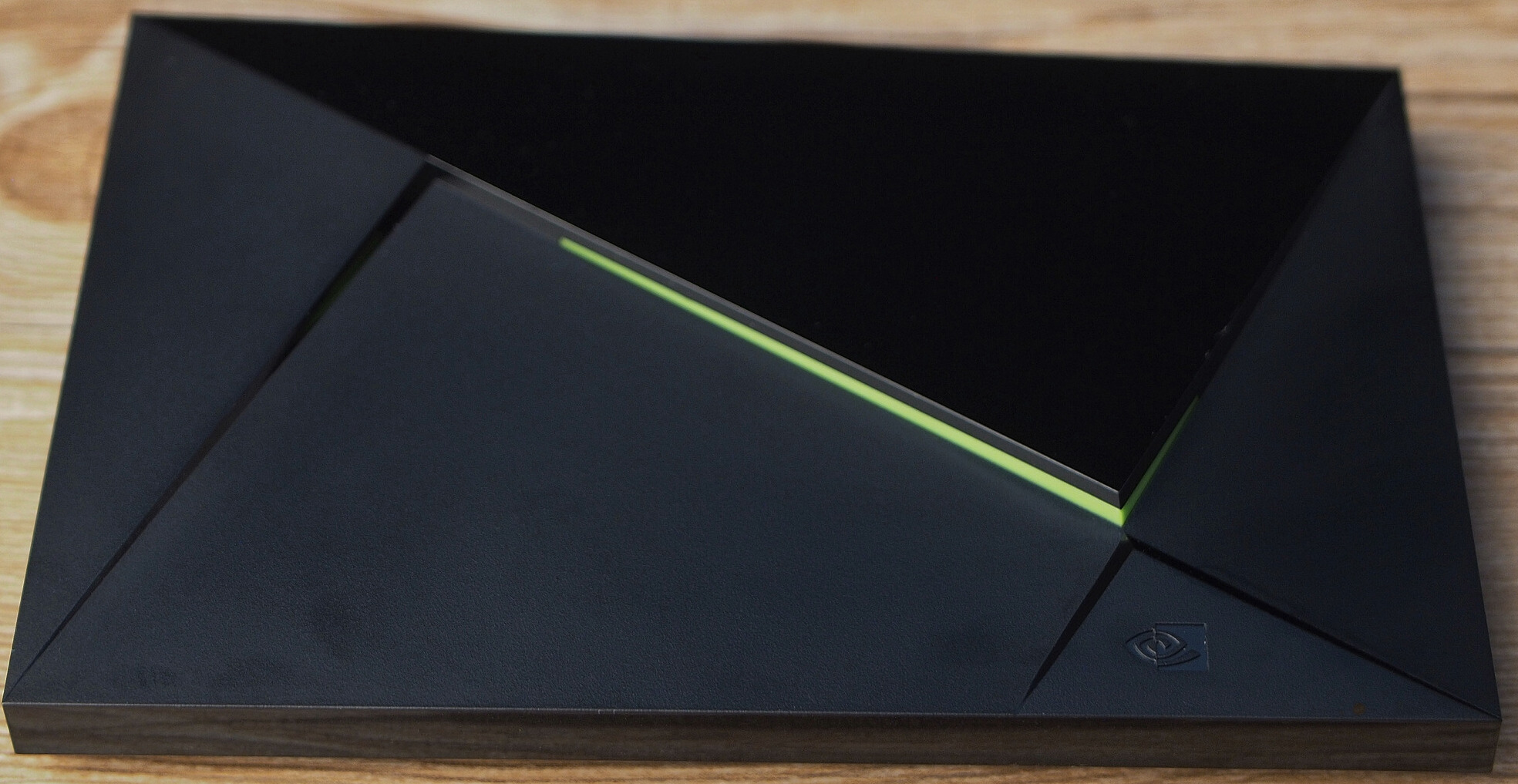
Nvidia Shield TV (2015)

Name	Release date	Manufacturer	OS
iQue Player	November 18, 2003	iQue	UOS
OnLive	December 2, 2010	OnLive	Custom Linux-based OS
Ouya	June 25, 2013	Ouya Inc. (formerly Boxer8)	Android
PlayStation TV	November 14, 2013	Sony Interactive Entertainment/Sony	PlayStation Vita OS
GameStick	November 15, 2013	PlayJam	Android
MOJO	December 10, 2013	Mad Catz	Android
Fire TV	April 12, 2014	Amazon.com	Fire OS (Android-based)
Nexus Player	November 3, 2014	Asus/Google	Android TV
Fire TV Stick	November 19, 2014	Amazon.com	Fire OS (Android-based)
Nvidia Shield TV	May 28, 2015	Nvidia	Android TV
Apple TV 4th Gen (HD)	October 26, 2015	Apple Inc.	tvOS
Apple TV 5th Gen (4K)	September 22, 2017	Apple Inc.	tvOS
Fire TV Cube	June 2018	Amazon.com	Fire OS (Android-based)
Nvidia Shield TV 3rd Gen	October 28, 2019	Nvidia	Android TV
Nvidia SHIELD TV Pro 3rd Gen	October 28, 2019	Nvidia	Android TV
Chromecast Ultra (Google Stadia Premiere Edition)	November 25, 2019	Google	Custom Linux-based OS
Apple TV 6th Gen (4K)	May 21, 2021	Apple Inc.	tvOS

== See also ==
- Comparison of digital media players
- List of best-selling game consoles
- List of video game console emulators
- Lists of video game consoles
  - List of home video game consoles
  - List of handheld game consoles
  - Cloud gaming
  - List of dedicated video game consoles
  - List of retro style video game consoles
