= Geniaware srl =

Video game developer

Geniaware srl was an Italian computer and video game developer owned by FishEagle, a digital media investment company. Formed in 2008 the Geniaware's headquarters resides in Reggio Emilia (Italy), whilst the development studio resides in Savona on the Italian Riviera, 40 minutes from Genoa airport, and within 80 minutes of the Italian Alps.

Geniaware's development team is made up of international video game industry veterans who are currently working on a multi platform title. It is titled Lords of Football and is developed for next-gen consoles and PC.

== Games ==
=== Lords of Football ===
The game was announced on 16 May 2011. Geniaware is trying to challenge the traditional forms of sports games with Lords of Football by offering the 'core' audience of gamers a lifestyle take on the football video game genre, there is a whole new approach to tactical and strategic gameplay whereby the game promises a "fully explorable 3D world" and "face-to-face dialogue with your players" both in the 3D world and during matches.
