= Comparison of digital media players =

A digital media player is a home entertainment consumer electronics device that can connect to a home network to stream digital media (such as music, pictures, or video).

== Standalone streaming players ==
This list does not include discontinued or legacy media players.

Maker	Model (Debut year)	Current version (year)	Connectivity	Audio output	Maximum video resolution	Video formats supported	Network	USB	Internal media storage	Card reader slot	Remote control
Amazon	Fire TV (2014), Fire TV Stick (2014)	Fire TV Stick (third generation, 2020), Fire TV Cube (second generation, 2019), Fire TV Stick 4K (2018)	HDMI (w/ CEC)	HDMI	4K@60fps (Fire TV Cube, Fire TV Stick 4K); 1080p (Fire TV Stick)	H.265/HEVC, VP9, H.264, H.263, MPEG4-SP, VC1	802.11a/b/g/n/ac, 10/100 Ethernet (via external dongle)	1× micro-USB for Ethernet dongle and OTG storage (Fire TV Cube), 1× micro-USB for power and Ethernet dongle (Fire TV Stick, Fire TV Stick 4K)	16GB (Fire TV Cube), 8GB (Fire TV Stick, Fire TV Stick 4K)	None	Bluetooth/IR remote with Alexa, Android app, iOS app
Apple	Apple TV (2007)	7th generation (2022)	HDMI (w/ CEC)	HDMI, Bluetooth,	4K@60fps (HDR)	H.265, H.264, MPEG-4, Motion JPEG	802.11a/b/g/n/ac/ax, Gigabit Ethernet, Thread	None	Up to 128GB NAND Flash	None	Siri Remote, iPhone app
Google	Chromecast (2013)	Chromecast with Google TV (CGTV; 2020 (4K) & 2022 (HD))	HDMI (w/ CEC)	HDMI	1080p (1st, 2nd, 3rd & CGTV HD); 4K@60fps (Ultra & CGTV 4K)	H.264, VP8 (Chromecast) H.263, H.264, H.265/HEVC, VP8, VP9 (Chromecast Ultra, CGTV)	802.11b/g/n/ac (Chromecast), 802.11a/b/g/n/ac (Nexus Player, CGTV)	1× micro-USB for power (Chromecast), 1 x USB-C for power, Ethernet and peripherals (CGTV)	2 GB for buffering (Chromecast), 8 GB for buffering (Nexus Player, CGTV)	None	None (Chromecast controllable by mobile device, Google Assistant or Chrome browser); Bluetooth/IR remote with Google Assistant (CGTV)
Nvidia	SHIELD Console (2013)	Nvidia Shield TV (third generation, 2019), Nvidia Shield TV Pro (third generation, 2019)	HDMI (w/ CEC)	3.5mm, HDMI	4K@60fps	MPEG2/4, XviD, DivX, MKV (H.264), MP4 (H.264), MOV (H.264), HEVC (H.265), WMV9, VC-1, VP8, VP9	802.11ac 10/100/1000 Ethernet	2x USB 3.0; 1x micro-USB	16GB, 500GB (SHIELD Pro)	Micro SD	IR remote (all models)
Roku	Roku Streaming Player (2008)	8th & 9th generation Express, Express+, Streaming Stick+, Premiere, Ultra LT, Ultra (2018)	HDMI	HDMI (all models), Optical Toslink (Ultra)	4K@60fps; 1080p on Express and Express+	H.264/AVC (.MKV, .MP4, .MOV), H.265/HEVC (.MKV, .MP4, .MOV); VP9 (.MKV)	802.11a/b/g/n (Express, Express+, Premiere); 802.11ac (Streaming Stick+, Ultra LT, Ultra); 10/100 Ethernet (Ultra)	1× USB 2.0 (Ultra models); 1× micro-USB for power (Streaming Stick+ Roku model)	256MB - 512MB	Micro SD (Premiere+ & Ultra)	IR remote (all models); Wi-Fi Direct (Streaming Stick+, Ultra); Headphone jack (Streaming Stick+, Ultra)

== Gaming systems ==
Manufacturer	System (year)	Connectivity	Maximum video resolution	Video formats supported	Network	USB	Internal media storage	Card reader slot	Web browser	Remote control	Network file server	Network file client
Microsoft	Xbox Series X/S (2020)	HDMI	4K@120fps (Xbox Series X); 1440p@120fps (Xbox Series S)	Many	802.11a/b/g/n/ac, 10/100/1000 Ethernet	3x USB 3.1	512GB or 1TB SSD	None	Yes	IR remote sold separately	Unspecified	DLNA
Microsoft	Xbox One (2013)	HDMI, HDMI-in, optical audio	1080p@60fps; 4K@60fps (Xbox One S, Xbox One X)	Many	802.11a/b/g/n/ac, 10/100/1000 Ethernet	3x USB 3.0	500GB up to 2TB hard drive, not user-upgradeable	None	Yes	IR remote sold separately	Unspecified	DLNA
Microsoft	Xbox 360 (2005)	HDMI, component audio/video, composite audio/video, optical audio	1080p	Many	802.11a/b/g/n, 10/100/1000 Ethernet	3x USB 2.0	4GB up to 500GB hard drive, user-upgradeable	None	Yes	IR remote sold separately	Unspecified	DLNA
Sony	PlayStation 5 (2020)	HDMI	4K@120fps	Many	802.11a/b/g/n/ac/ax, 10/100/1000 Ethernet	2x USB 3.1, 1x USB 2.0, 1x USB-C with USB 3.1	825GB SSD, user-upgradeable	None	No	IR remote sold separately	N/A	DLNA
Sony	PlayStation 4 (2013)	HDMI, optical audio	1080p@60fps; 4K@60fps (PS4 Pro)	Many	802.11 b/g/n, 10/100/1000 Ethernet	2x USB 3.0	500GB or 1TB hard drive, user-upgradeable	None	Yes	IR remote sold separately	None	DLNA
Sony	PlayStation 3 (2006)	HDMI, composite audio/video, component audio/video, optical audio	1080p	Many	802.11a/b/g/n, 10/100/1000 Ethernet	2x USB 2.0 (4x USB 2.0)	12GB up to 500GB hard drive, user-upgradeable	Some early models include card readers, other models do not.	Yes	Bluetooth remote built into controller, IR remote sold separately	None	DLNA
Nintendo	Wii U (2012)	HDMI, component audio/video, composite audio/video	1080p	H.264 via browser	802.11a/b/g/n, 10/100 Ethernet	4x USB 2.0	8 or 32 GB NAND flash, not user-upgradeable	SD card	Yes	IR remote built into GamePad	None	None

== Content agreements ==
=== Internet video services ===
Model	Amazon Video	Crackle	Flixster	Google Play (Google TV)	Hulu	iTunes (Apple TV)	Movies Anywhere	Netflix	Sling TV	Vevo	Vimeo	Vudu	WWE Network	YouTube	UltraFlix
Amazon Fire TV	Yes	Yes	Yes	No	Yes	Yes	Yes	Yes	Yes	Yes	Yes	Yes	Yes	Yes	Yes
Apple TV	Yes (3rd generation and later)	Yes	No	No	Yes	Yes	Yes	Yes	Yes	Yes	Yes	4th generation and later	Yes	with software version 7.2 and later	Yes (HD)
Asus Cube	Yes	No	No	Yes	Yes	No	?	Yes	No	No	No	No	No	Yes	No
Google Chromecast/Nexus Player	Yes	Yes	Yes	Yes	Yes	Yes	Yes	Yes	Yes	Yes	Yes	Yes	Yes	Yes	Yes
Hisense Pulse	No	Yes	Yes	Yes	No	No	?	Yes	No	No	No	Yes	No	Yes	Yes
Little Smart Box	No	Yes	Yes	Yes	Yes	No	?	Yes	No	Yes	Yes	Yes	No	Yes	No
Microsoft Xbox	Yes	Yes	Yes	No	Yes	Yes	Yes	Yes	Yes	Yes	No	Yes	Yes	Yes	Yes
NanoTech Nuvola	No	No	No	Yes	Yes	No	?	Yes	No	No	No	No	No	Yes	Yes
Nintendo	Yes	No	No	No	Yes	No	?	No	No	No	No	No	No	Yes	No
Roku	Yes	Yes	Yes	Yes	Yes	Yes	Yes	Yes	Yes	Yes	Yes	Yes	Yes	Yes	Yes
SHIELD Android TV	Yes	Yes	Yes	Yes	Yes	Yes	Yes	Yes	Yes	Yes	Yes	Yes	Yes	Yes	Yes
Sony PlayStation	Yes	Yes	No	No	Yes	Yes	?	Yes	No	No	No	Yes	Yes	Yes	No
Vizio Co-Star	Yes	Yes	No	No	LT only	No	?	Yes	Yes	No	No	Yes	No	Yes	Yes
Western Digital WD TV	No	No	Yes	No	Yes	No	?	Live and Play versions	No	No	Yes	Yes	No	Yes	No

=== American television services ===
Model	Charter Spectrum	Verizon FiOS	Comcast Xfinity	Watch ABC	PBS	Fox Now	A&E	Bloomberg	Disney Channel	FX Now	History Channel	Lifetime	MTV	SyFy	Watch ESPN	Encore Play	EPIX	HBO GO	HBO Max	Showtime Anytime	Starz Play
Amazon Fire TV	No	Yes	Yes	Yes	Yes	Yes	Yes	Yes	Yes	Yes	Yes	Yes	Yes	Yes	Yes	Yes	Yes	Yes	Yes (was unavailable until Nov. 17, 2020)	Yes	Yes
Apple TV	Yes	Yes	Yes	Yes	Yes	Yes	Yes	Yes	Yes	Yes	Yes	Yes	Yes	Yes	Yes	Yes	Yes	Yes	Yes	Yes	Yes
Google Chromecast	Yes	Yes	Yes	Yes	Yes	Yes	No	No	Yes	Yes	No	No	No	No	Yes	Yes	Yes	Yes	Yes	Yes	Yes
Microsoft Xbox	Yes	No	No	Xbox 360 only	Yes	Yes	Yes	No	Xbox 360 only	Xbox One only, Xbox 360 upcoming	Yes	Yes	Yes	Yes	Xbox One only	Yes	Yes	Yes	Yes	Yes	Yes
Roku	Yes	No	Yes	Yes	Yes	Yes	Yes	Yes	Yes	Yes	Yes	Yes	Yes	Yes	Yes	Yes	Yes	Yes	Yes (was unavailable until Dec. 2020)	Yes	Yes
Sony PlayStation	No	No	No	No	No	No	No	No	No	No	No	No	No	No	No	No	Yes	Yes	Yes	No	No

NOTE: These tables are not comprehensive or all inclusive; some pay-TV services may not have contracts with certain networks or refuse to serve networks on certain platforms.

==== Digital Media Players for Digital Signage ====
One of the popular use cases of using media player, is digital signage. There are new players like ONN produced by Walmart, Xiaomi TV Stick.

== See also ==
- Digital media player
- List of smart TV platforms
- List of microconsoles
- Home theater PC
