= Nvidia Shield TV =

Digital media player by Nvidia

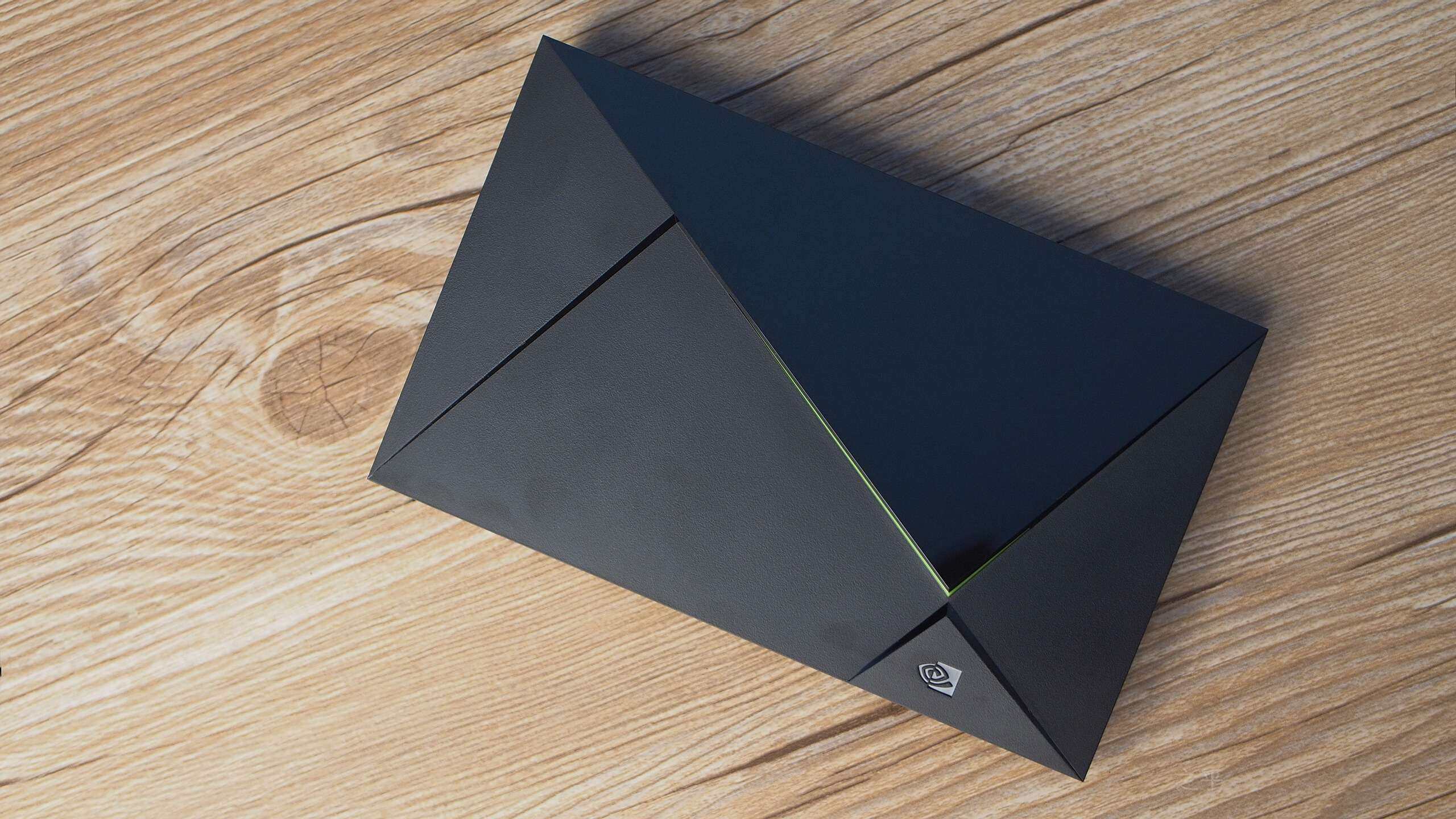
- 2017 version of the Nvidia Shield TV
- Also known as: Shield Android TV
- Manufacturer: Nvidia
- Product family: Shield
- Type: Set-top box, microconsole
- Released: NA: May 28, 2015
- Introductory price: US$199.99
- Operating system: Android TV
- System on a chip: Tegra X1+
- Memory: 2 or 3 GB
- Storage: 8 or 16 GB flash memory
- Display: Up to 4K, HDR, 60FPS
- Controller input: Remote
- Connectivity: Wi-Fi, Bluetooth 5.0, Gigabit Ethernet, USB 3.0, HDMI 2.0
- Online services: GeForce Now; Google Play
- Related: Shield Tablet
- Website: nvidia.com/shield

The Nvidia Shield TV (also known as Shield Android TV) is an Android TV-based digital media player and microconsole produced by Nvidia as part of its Shield brand of Android devices. First released in May 2015, the Shield was initially marketed by Nvidia as a microconsole, emphasizing its ability to play downloaded games and stream games from a compatible PC on a local network, or via the GeForce Now subscription service. As with all other Android TV devices, it can also stream content from various sources using apps, and also supports 4K resolution video. It is produced in two models, with the second Shield TV Pro model distinguished primarily by increased internal storage.

In 2017, Nvidia released a refreshed version of the 16 GB Shield, which has a smaller form factor that drops microSD and infrared support, comes with an updated controller, and is otherwise identical in hardware to the original model. In 2019, Nvidia refreshed the Shield TV lineup with upgraded processors, and revised the base model with a smaller form factor and less internal storage.

== Specifications ==
The Shield utilizes Nvidia's Tegra X1 system-on-chip, based on the ARM Cortex-A57 CPU and Nvidia's Maxwell microarchitecture GPU, with 3 GB of RAM. The device supports 4K resolution output at 60 FPS over an HDMI 2.0 output, with support for HEVC-encoded video. The Shield can either contain 16 GB of internal flash storage or a 500 GB hard drive, expandable via microSD card or removable storage. 2015 and 2017 Shield models with a 500 GB hard drive are branded as Shield Pro. It contains two USB ports. For internet connections, it supports gigabit Ethernet and 802.11ac Wi-Fi. The console ships with one wireless controller; a wireless micro-USB-rechargeable remote with voice control and a headphone jack is sold separately but is no longer available from official channels.

The Shield runs Android TV; games optimized and ported for the device are offered through a separate Shield Store app. The device can also stream games through Nvidia's on-demand subscription cloud gaming service, GeForce Now (formerly Nvidia GRID), and from a local computer using the GameStream function of supported Nvidia graphics cards via the GeForce Experience application. In addition to native Android gaming and game streaming, retro gaming emulation is popular on the Nvidia Shield TV.

== Models ==
=== Original (2015) ===
Nvidia released the first Shield Android TV in 2015. The micro-console uses a in-house built Tegra X1 20nm SoC processor with an octo-core CPU configuration ― four ARM A57s paired with four lower-power A53s and a 256-core Maxwell GPU and 3GB of DDR3L RAM. 16GB of internal storage which can be upgraded via microSD. Network options are either 802.11ac dual-band Wi-Fi or wired gigabit Ethernet. The HDMI 2.0 port has full HDCP 2.2 support and outputs full 4K. It ran Android TV version 5.1 at launch.

=== 2017 version ===
On January 16, 2017, Nvidia unveiled a refreshed version of the 16 GB Shield. It has a revised form factor with a smaller size but no microSD slot, and is supplied with Shield Experience Upgrade 5.0. A revised Bluetooth remote control with no headphone jack and replaceable CR2032 battery is now bundled, as well as an updated controller with an always-on microphone. The 2017 model contains the same Tegra X1 system-on-chip as the 2015 model. The 2017 Shield replaced the original 16 GB version.

=== 2019 version ===
On October 28, 2019, Nvidia unveiled two new Shield TV models. Both models use the Tegra X1+ system-on-chip, ship with Android 9.0 "Pie", support for Dolby Atmos and Dolby Vision, a redesigned remote control, and a new "AI-enhanced" upscaling system that can upscale high-definition video to 4K resolution. The base model uses a cylindrical form factor rather than a set-top box form, and has 2 GB of RAM and 8 GB of flash storage, expandable via microSD card (in place of USB ports). The Shield TV Pro uses the same set-top box form factor as the previous model, and includes 3 GB of RAM, 16 GB of flash storage, and two full-size USB 3.0 ports. A gamepad is no longer included.

Model name	Model #	Launch	Form factor	Processor	RAM	Storage	microSD	USB	IR receiver	HDMI / DP	Ethernet	WiFi	Bluetooth	Bundled accessories	VQ- playback (max)	VQ- capture (max)	Upscaling	HDR	Dolby Atmos
Shield TV	P2571	2015	Box	Nvidia Tegra X1	3GB	16GB	Yes	3x (2x 3.0 typeA, 1x microUSB	Yes	HDMI 2.0 w/ HDCP 2.2 & CEC (HDMI 2.0b by FW update)	GbE	802.11ac 2x2 MIMO	4.1 / LE	Gamepad	4K at 60fps	4K at 30fps		HDR10	Passthrough
Shield TV Pro	P2571	2015	Box	Nvidia Tegra X1	3GB	500GB	Yes	3x (2x 3.0 typeA, 1x microUSB)	Yes	HDMI 2.0 w/ HDCP 2.2 & CEC (HDMI 2.0b by FW update)	GbE	802.11ac 2x2 MIMO	4.1 / LE	Remote, gamepad	4K at 60fps	4K at 30fps		HDR10	Passthrough
Shield TV	P2897	2017	Box	Nvidia Tegra X1	3GB	16GB	No	2x (3.0 typeA)	No	HDMI 2.0 w/ HDCP 2.2 & CEC (HDMI 2.0b by FW update)	GbE	802.11ac 2x2 MIMO	4.1 / LE	Remote, gamepad (V2)	4K at 60fps			HDR10	Passthrough
Shield TV	P3430	2019	Cylindrical	Nvidia Tegra X1+	2GB	8GB	Yes	No	No	HDMI 2.0b w/ HDCP 2.2 & CEC	GbE	802.11ac 2x2 MIMO	5.0 + LE	Remote (V2)	4K at 60fps		AI upscaling	HDR10 and Dolby Vision	Decode + passthrough
Shield TV Pro	P2897	2019	Box	Nvidia Tegra X1+	3GB	16GB	No	2x (3.0 typeA)	No	HDMI 2.0b w/ HDCP 2.2 & CEC	GbE	802.11ac 2x2 MIMO	5.0 + LE	Remote (V2)	4K at 60fps		AI upscaling	HDR10 and Dolby Vision	Decode + passthrough

== Operating system ==
Shield TV uses an Android-based operating system, Google's Android TV OS, which Nvidia brands as Shield Experience.

=== January 2017 ===
Shield Experience Upgrade 5.0, which is based on Android 7.0 "Nougat", adds software features from the updated 2017 model, including HDR support for 4K video, new apps (including Amazon Video), SmartThings integration, Google Assistant support, and a new Nvidia Games interface. Google Assistant support requires a new iteration of the Shield Controller. In June 2018, Nvidia released an update to Android 8.0 "Oreo".

=== June 2021 ===
An update of Android TV to Google TV made Google Stadia available for the 2019 versions of Nvidia Shield TV and Nvidia Shield TV Pro.

=== December 2021, Shield Experience Upgrade 9.0 ===
In December 2021, Nvidia released an update bringing Android 11 to the Shield TV platform.

Update included:

- Android security patch level: September 2021
- Support for aptX-compatible Bluetooth headsets
- Option to automatically disconnect Bluetooth devices when the system enters sleep mode
- Option to match content audio resolution, enabling high-resolution audio output
- A new Gboard keyboard version
- A new Energy Saver setting for expanded power-management customization
- Stadia button support for Xbox, PlayStation, and Shield controllers
- Support for GeForce NOW cloud gaming in 4K resolution with HDR
- Support for 7.1 surround sound
- Expanded controller compatibility to include Xbox One, Xbox Series X, PlayStation 4, PlayStation 5, and Scuf controllers.

=== June 2022, Shield Experience Upgrade 9.1 ===
A July 2022 update introduced Automatic Game Mode for Shield TV, enabling the device to activate Auto Low Latency Mode (ALLM) when connected to compatible displays. The update also added a Night Listening Mode, designed to normalize loud and quiet audio elements—such as explosions and dialogue—providing a consistent listening experience at lower volume levels.

Update included:

- Android security patch level: April 2022
- Notifications when an application accesses the microphone
- Shield Remote 2019: Option to wake the device only using the power or Netflix button
- Game controllers: Option to wake the device only using the controller’s logo button
- Shield 2019 models: Option to match PCM audio output with Dolby reference volume levels

=== May 2025, Shield Experience Upgrade 9.2 ===
In February 2025, Nvidia released Shield Experience Upgrade 9.2, introducing full Auro-3D support for high-resolution immersive audio playback over HDMI.

Updates included:

- Support for the “Match audio content resolution” feature when using a USB DAC
- Ability to clear the HDMI 1.4 flag through a factory reset
- Enhancements to the Match Frame Rate (beta) feature
- Addition of French parental control options
- Security improvements for 4K DRM playback

=== February 2026, Shield Experience Upgrade 9.2.4 ===
On February 25, 2026, Nvidia released Shield Experience Upgrade 9.2.4, bringing security patches up to January 2026 and fixing issues related to video playback, remote connectivity, and HDMI-CEC.

== See also ==
- List of microconsoles
- History of video game consoles (eighth generation)
- Shield Portable
- Shield Tablet
