= PlayStation TV =

Microconsole manufactured by Sony Computer Entertainment

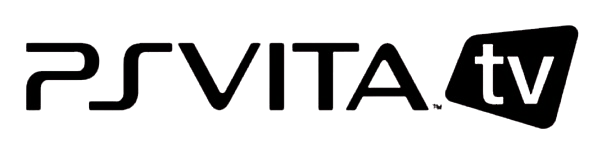
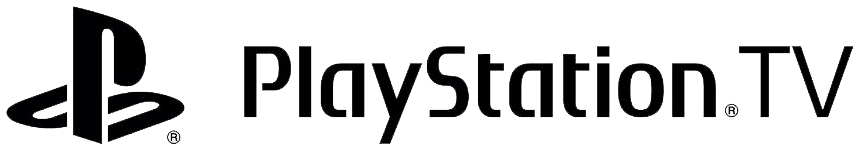
- Top: Logo used in Asia; Bottom: Logo used outside of Asia

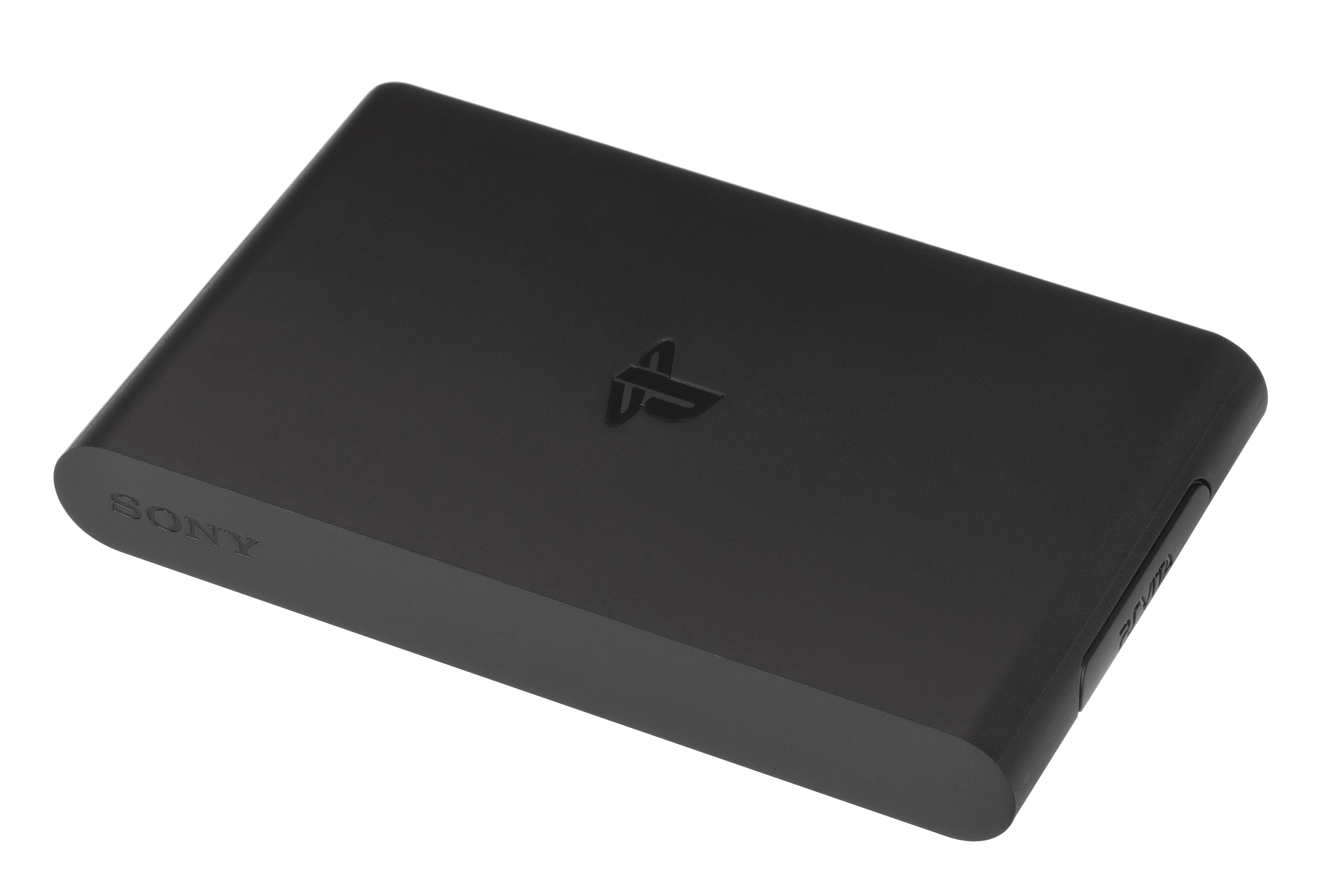
- The PlayStation TV console
- Developer: Sony Computer Entertainment
- Manufacturer: Sony
- Product family: PlayStation
- Type: Microconsole
- Generation: Eighth
- Released: JP: November 14, 2013; SG/MY/TH/ID/PH/HK/KR: January 16, 2014; NA: October 15, 2014; EU/AU: November 14, 2014
- Introductory price: ¥9,480 (Japan) $99 (North America) €99 (Europe) Full list of countries: SG$149 (Singapore) MYR469 (Malaysia) TH฿4,590 (Thailand) IDR1,799,000 (Indonesia) PH₱5,999 (Philippines) HK$798 (Hong Kong) KR₩128,000 (South Korea) £84.99 (United Kingdom) $149.95 (Australia) $159.95 (New Zealand)
- Discontinued: US/EU: 2015; JP: February 29, 2016
- Media: PS Vita Card, digital distribution
- Operating system: PlayStation Vita system software
- CPU: Quad-core ARM Cortex-A9 MPCore
- Memory: 512 MB RAM, 128 MB VRAM
- Storage: 1GB internal, expandable via PS Vita memory card (4, 8, 16, 32 or 64 GB)
- Display: HDMI out (720p, 1080i, 480p)
- Graphics: Quad-core PowerVR SGX543MP4+
- Sound: 2 channel LPCM
- Controller input: Sixaxis, DualShock 3, DualShock 4, PlayStation Vita
- Connectivity: IEEE 802.11 b/g/n Wi-Fi, Bluetooth 2.1+EDR (A2DP, AVRCP, HSP, HID), Ethernet LAN (10BASE-T, 100BASE-TX)
- Power: DC 5V in (max 2.8W)
- Online services: PlayStation Network
- Dimensions: 65.0 × 105.0 × 13.6 mm
- Weight: 110 grams
- Website: playstation.com/en-us/explore/playstationtv/ at the Wayback Machine (archived 2017-07-24)

The PlayStation TV (abbreviated to PS TV), known in Japan and other parts of Asia as the PlayStation Vita TV or PS Vita TV, is a microconsole by Sony in the PlayStation hardware family, which includes a home console variant of the PlayStation Vita, a handheld game console. It was released in Japan on November 14, 2013, and Europe and Australia on November 14, 2014.

Controlled with either the Sixaxis, DualShock 3, or DualShock 4 controllers, the PS TV is capable of playing many PlayStation Vita games and applications, either through physical cartridges or downloaded through the PlayStation Store. However, not all content is compatible with the device, since certain features in the PS Vita such as the gyroscope and microphone are not available on the PS TV. Nevertheless, the PS TV is able to emulate touch input for both the Vita's front and rear touchpads using the PS3 and PS4 controller.

In Japan, "PlayStation TV" was the name given to PlayStation 3 retail kiosks from 2006 to 2014, which consisted of a PS3 unit, an LCD monitor and a number of controllers.

== History ==
=== Release ===
The system was released in Japan on November 14, 2013. The device on its own sold for 9,954 yen tax inclusive (about US$100), whilst a bundle version with an 8 GB memory card and DualShock 3 controller retailed for 14,994 yen (about US$150).

Andrew House, CEO of Sony Computer Entertainment, explained that Sony hoped to use the PS Vita TV to penetrate the Chinese gaming market, where video game consoles have previously been prohibited. The PS Vita TV was released in five other Southeast Asian countries and the special region of Hong Kong on January 16, 2014. At E3 2014, the system was announced for North America and Europe, under the name PlayStation TV, for release in Q3 2014. Final release dates for the western release were announced at Gamescom 2014.

System software update 3.15 was released on April 30, 2014, which enabled PS4 remote play functionality for the PS Vita TV. In October 2014, the system was updated so that it could be used with PlayStation Network accounts originating from outside the original launch territories of Japan and Asia following the release of system software firmware version 3.30 update, which also renames the PS Vita TV system to PS TV within the system menus.

Open beta trials for PlayStation Now functionality on the PS TV began on October 14, 2014, in North America, the same day that PS TV was released there. By the end of March, in Europe, Sony has dropped the price of PlayStation TV by 40% with the new price of €59.99. That same week the sales had increased by 1272%.

On February 28, 2016, Engadget reported that Sony had stopped shipping the PlayStation TV in Japan. Sony confirmed shipments were discontinued in Americas and Europe at the end of 2015, however they would continue in Asia contrary to reports.

== Features ==
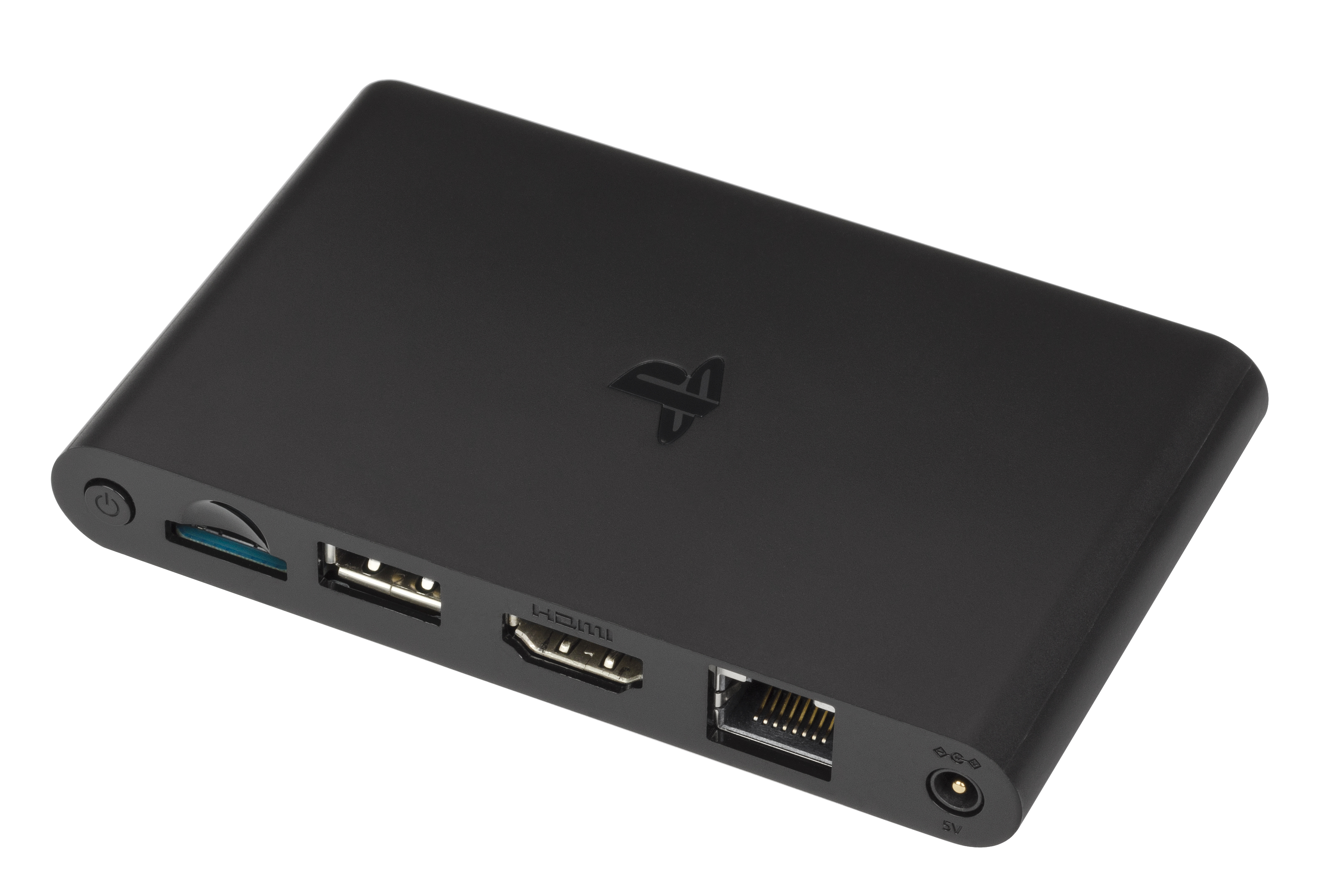
Ports on the PlayStation Vita TV

Instead of featuring a display screen, the console connects to a television via HDMI. Users can play using a Sixaxis controller or a DualShock 3 controller (with functionality for DualShock 4 controllers added with the 3.10 firmware update released on March 25, 2014), although due to the difference in features between the controller and the handheld, certain games are not compatible with PS Vita TV, such as those that are dependent on the system's microphone, camera, or gyroscopic features. The device is said to be compatible with over 100 PS Vita games, as well as various digital PlayStation Portable, and PlayStation titles, along with a selection of PlayStation 3 titles streamed from the PlayStation Now service. The device is technically referred to by Sony as the VTE-1000 series, to distinguish it from the handheld PCH-1000/2000 series PS Vita models.

According to Muneki Shimada, Sony Director of the Second Division of Software Development, the original PCH-1000 series PlayStation Vita already includes an upscaler that supports up to 1080i resolution, however it was decided that the idea for video output for the original Vita was to be scrapped in favor for releasing the PlayStation Vita TV as a separate device for television connectivity. The in-built scaler has been removed from the PCH-2000 series PlayStation Vita model.

The system supports Remote Play compatibility with the PlayStation 4, allowing players to stream games from the PlayStation 4 to a separate TV connected to PS Vita TV, and also allows users to stream content from video services such as Hulu and Niconico, as well as access the PlayStation Store. PS4 Remote Play functionality for the PS Vita TV gained full support with the release of the 1.70 PS4 firmware update. The device includes the software features of the PS Vita, such as the Web browser and email client.

The console measures 6.5 cm by 10.5 cm, about the size of a pack of playing cards.

== Reception ==
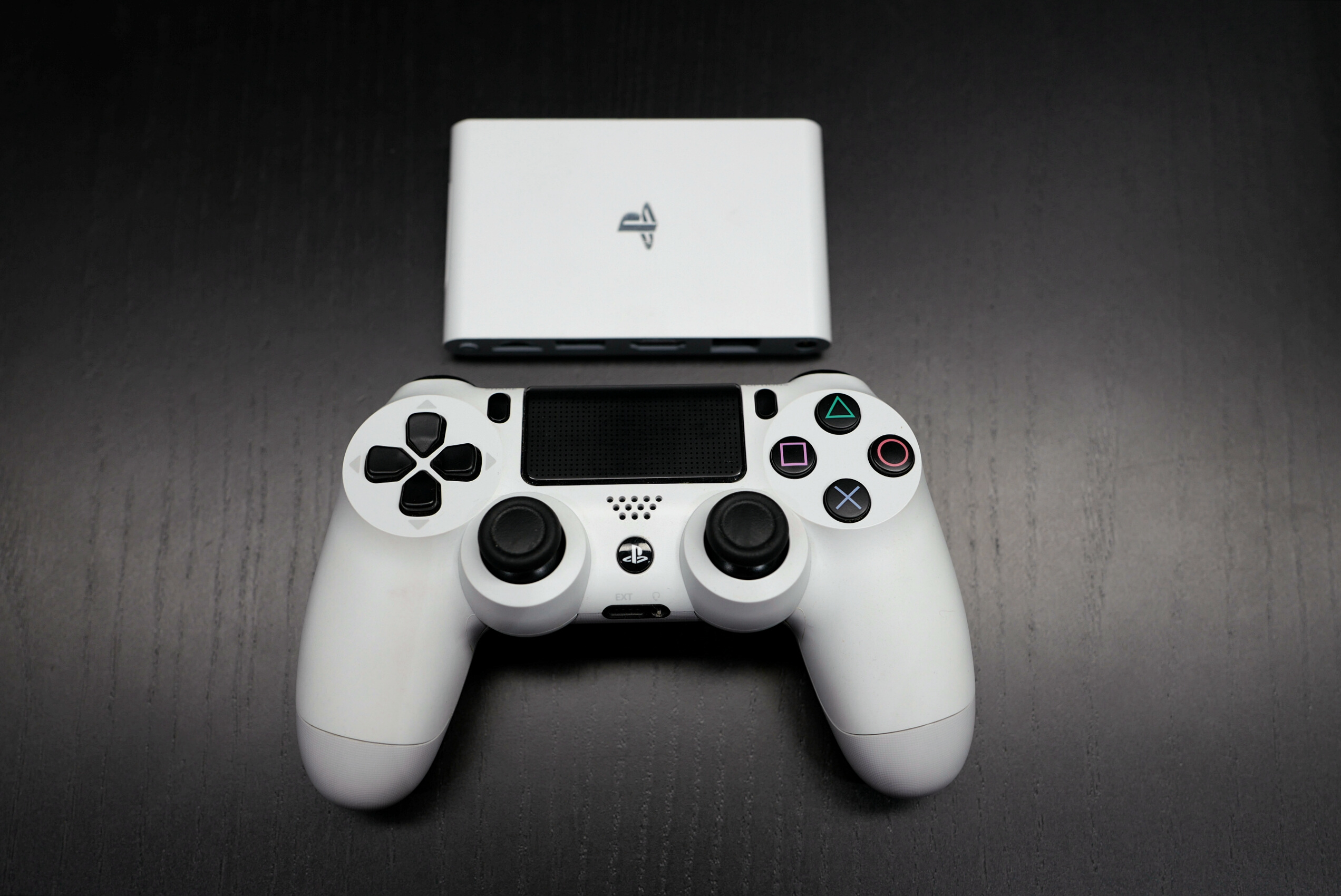
A white PlayStation TV and DualShock 4 controller

PC World called the device an amazing invention, praising the opportunity to play Vita and PSP games on the big screen. IGN said the console "may be one of Sony's most exciting new products and could provide a critical edge for the PS4."

Various commentators have compared the device to set-top boxes—including media streaming devices (such as Apple TV and Chromecast) and other microconsoles, such as the Ouya. Time said the console could compete well against set-top box competitors with a quality library of games. At launch however, the game library was limited to a subset of PS Vita games, which negatively impacted early reviews.

The PlayStation TV, along with the PlayStation 4, won the 2014 Good Design Award from the Japan Institute of Design Promotion.

The PlayStation TV sold 42,172 units during its debut week of release in Japan. The PlayStation TV was heavily marketed alongside God Eater 2 which was released on the same day as the device, and placed at the top of the Japanese software sales charts for that week.

=== Compatibility and whitelist hack ===
Journalists criticized the platform's lack of compatibility with the Vita's overall software library. Sam Byford of The Verge commented: "Vita TV’s most egregious failure was that it failed at being a Vita. Many games’ reliance on dubious Vita features like the rear touchpad came back to haunt Sony, as vast swathes of the system's library was rendered incompatible with a regular gaming controller. And even some games that should by rights have worked just didn't, for whatever reason." Andrew Hayward of IGN wrote: "Sadly, anyone with a large Vita library will surely find the incredibly massive holes in the PlayStation TV's compatibility list quite quickly. The 140+ compatible Vita games as of this writing represent a rather small chunk of those released in North America, and the omissions are baffling." The omissions included some of the Vita's heavy hitters such as Uncharted: Golden Abyss, Wipeout 2048, Assassin's Creed III: Liberation, Lumines: Electronic Symphony, Tearaway, Gravity Rush, Borderlands 2, The Sly Collection and others. Hayward also reported: "It's possible to navigate menus in games with a cursor via the DualShock 4's touch pad, so why didn't Sony enlist its studios and third-party partners to make sure the biggest and best Vita games were patched and ready to play on day one? That's not the kind of thing to ignore or worry about down the line." Richard Leadbetter of Eurogamer's Digital Foundry shared these sentiments, arguing that games such as Wipeout 2048 didn't need to be blacklisted, as it only used the touchscreen for the menus and could be accessed using the DualShock 4's touch pointer emulation: "Life as a PlayStation TV owner can be pretty frustrating - especially when a vast array of mobile Vita titles that should work just fine on the under-utilised micro-console fail to load at all, blocked by their lack of inclusion on Sony's whitelist of approved titles." Sean Hollister of Gizmodo complained that even ports of PlayStation 3 games didn't work on the PS TV, including Sound Shapes, Flower and Guacamelee.

In 2015 and 2016, hackers found ways to overwrite the PS TV's Whitelist to allow any Vita game to load. But while all games would load, compatibility issues persisted in certain Vita games reliant on touch and motion controls. For example, Uncharted: Golden Abyss is playable up until any mini game prompting the player to tilt the Vita side to side in order to balance Nathan Drake as he crosses a log. But for the most part, the Whitelist hack was well received by journalists, as many other games were playable from start to finish. Kyle Orland of Ars Technica reported: "some enterprising hackers have apparently gone a long way toward fixing this problem by increasing the PlayStation TV's software compatibility with a simple hack." Joel Hruska of ExtremeTech reported that "a full 30 additional titles" from his collection of Vita games were compatible with PS TV Whitelist hack. J.C. Torres confirmed that Assassin's Creed III: Liberation, Call of Duty: Black Ops Declassified, Hatsune Miku: Project DIVA F, Silent Hill: Book of Memories and Gravity Rush were among the titles compatible with the hack. He also reported: "Interestingly, Netflix also becomes compatible with this hack. Netflix is a curious case for the PS TV, as the app, which worked for the Vita, remains broken for the mini console. A tragedy for a set-top box device." Leadbetter rejoiced: "For the first time, you can play non-approved games like Wipeout 2048 and the Metal Gear Solid HD Collection on your handheld, then continue playing them at home on the big screen." He also felt "this exploit opens up some delicious gaming opportunities." Marliella Moon of Engadget even joked about the incompatibility of a stock PS TV in her review of the Whitelist hack: "If you have a PlayStation TV collecting dust in a cabinet somewhere, this might make it useful again."

== See also ==
- Lists of PlayStation Vita games (table has a column denoting compatibility)
