= Lords of Football =

2013 video game

- Developer(s): Geniaware Srl
- Publisher(s): Fish Eagle
- Platform(s): Microsoft Windows
- Release: Microsoft Windows; 5 April 2013
- Genre(s): Sport simulations (Association football)

Lords of Football is a 2013 association football life simulation video game developed by Italian company Geniaware srl. It was released on 5 April 2013 for Microsoft Windows.

== Gameplay ==
In the game, the player is given the ability to run a professional football club in either England, France, Spain, Germany, or Italy, with the ultimate goal of winning the European Cup. Also, the player must train all players, put players with addictions in rehab before they become a problem, and discipline those who misbehave. However, the game does not license any of the teams or players from the official leagues in those countries, so unlicensed names, crests, and kits take their place. However, players have the ability to customize a team's kit or badge to their liking using one of the default teams in the game.

== Downloadable content ==
On July 8, 2013, Geniaware released the Super Training DLC pack, which added some medieval-themed training exercises as choices. On August 1, 2013, Geniaware released the Eastern Europe DLC pack, which adds Poland, Russia, and Ukraine to the list of countries where the player can run their own football club.
