= GameStick =

Discontinued home video game console

- Also known as: Game Stick
- Developer: PlayJam
- Product family: First Generation
- Type: Microconsole
- Released: November 15, 2013
- Introductory price: US$79 (equivalent to $109.19 in 2025)
- Discontinued: January 9, 2017
- Operating system: Android 4.1 Jelly Bean
- System on a chip: Amlogic 8726-MX
- CPU: ARM Cortex A9
- Memory: 1 GB DDR3
- Storage: 8 GB internal flash memory
- Display: HDMI; 1080p, 720p
- Graphics: Mali-400 MP
- Input: Bluetooth
- Controller input: Wireless controller
- Connectivity: HDMI; Wi-Fi 802.11 b/g/n; Bluetooth LE 4.0
- Dimensions: Size of a flash drive
- Successor: PlayJam OTT
- Website: http://www.gamestick.tv/ (Archived)

The GameStick is a discontinued home video game console developed by PlayJam. It is a microconsole the size of a USB flash drive that plugs directly into the back of a TV through an HDMI port and ships with its own Bluetooth controller. Users can download content from a curated storefront via Wi-Fi, with content stored locally for offline access. The device is powered by the PlayJam Games Platform and runs its own version of the Android operating system. It is portable and aimed at casual to mid-core gamers. Like the Ouya, it was funded through Kickstarter.

Because of a change in production methods, the original release date of June 2013 was delayed, and units did not ship to retailers until early November 2013. The GameStick features an exclusive game and access to its app store, which mainly sells casual games. All systems can be used as development kits, allowing any GameStick owner to also be a developer, without licensing fees. The GameStick is part of the eighth generation of video game consoles.

Jasper Smith (chief executive officer of PlayJam) and the PlayJam development team began recruiting support early in the process. Before the project's launch, GameStick, based out of San Francisco, California, was said to have support from more than 1,000 developers. Game designers interested in the project could pledge $500 in exchange for a prototype unit and development kit one month before launch. As of February 2013, the game was successfully funded with over 5,600 backers and about $650,000 raised.

== Design and specifications ==
The GameStick consists of the flash-drive-sized console and a wireless Bluetooth controller. The controller has two analog sticks, a directional pad, four face buttons, two shoulder buttons, four system buttons for power and menus, and a slot in which the console can be stored. A GameStick dock is also available; it allows faster internet access with an Ethernet port, charging access for both the controller and the console, additional storage space, and the ability to connect to various peripherals such as USB keyboards, webcams, microphones, and dance mats. The console contains an HDMI connector, an internal processor and memory, and wireless radios.

Up to four controllers can be connected via Bluetooth 4.0, as can wireless keyboards and mice. The GameStick also supports iOS and Android devices as controllers. The system itself is Android-based but iOS compatible. The device supports 1080 HD playback as well as XBMC DLNA with an optional firmware upgrade. The GameStick uses an interface similar to the tiled dashboard on the Xbox 360. The charger is a micro USB cable.

GameStick was the first third-party device to license ToFu Media Center, a derivative fork of XBMC Media Center.

== Reception ==
The Verge praised the GameStick's minimalist design and low cost, but criticized its limited game selection, its locked-down software and hardware, and its under-powered CPU, which was unable to play the latest Android games. Similarly, Engadget cited the device's portability, low price, and slick design as strengths but was disappointed by the selection of games and the hardware, which it said could become outdated fairly quickly.

== Shutdown ==
The GameStick website began displaying a message saying that they would be shutting down the service after two years of operation, stating that after January 9th, 2017, the storefront would be inactive.

In December 2017, the GameStick website showed only the goodbye message and presented an expired SSL certificate. It is unlikely the service will ever return and the device itself is indirectly discontinued. Attempting to visit the GameStick website will cause a redirection to a Turkish betting website.

== Revival ==
There has been a revival of the GameStick servers by Christian Weiske. There are instructions to enroll a GameStick into his servers on his website.

== See also ==
- PlayJam
- Free-to-play
- Independent video game development
- List of OnLive video games
- Open source video game
- Homebrew (video games)
