= PlayMemories Studio =

Photo and video sharing application

PlayMemories Studio was a photo and video sharing application that was released on the European version of the PlayStation Store on March 28, 2012. It is an application for the PS3 system that allows users to edit photos and videos or view these items as slide shows.

Users who wish to download the application must first download the trial version which allows them up to one month of free use; the application becomes unusable after that time, unless the user downloads an unlock code which is available to PlayStation Plus members or those paying a fee.

PlayMemories Studio was discontinued in favor of PlayMemories Online. It was supported until November 30, 2015.

PlayMemories Online was released for PlayStation 4 in October 2014.
