= Lists of video game consoles =

The list of video game consoles is split into the following articles:

- List of video game consoles by generation
- List of dedicated video game consoles
- List of handheld game consoles
- List of home video game consoles
  - List of first generation home video game consoles
- List of microconsoles
- List of retro style video game consoles
- List of best-selling game consoles
  - List of best-selling game consoles by region
- List of PowerPC-based game consoles

== See also ==
- List of accessories to video games by system
- List of game controllers
- List of virtual reality headsets
