= Mojo (microconsole) =

Android-based video game microconsole

- The M.O.J.O controller and console
- Manufacturer: Mad Catz
- Type: Microconsole
- Released: USA|UK: December 10, 2013; EU: Released, but unknown date, probably either 2014 or 2015
- Introductory price: $249.99 USD
- Operating system: Android 4.2.2 Jelly Bean
- System on a chip: Nvidia Tegra 4 T40S
- CPU: 1.8 GHz Quad-Core ARM Cortex-A15
- Memory: 2 GiB DDR3 SDRAM
- Storage: 16 GB internal flash memory
- Display: HDMI; 1080p, 720p
- Graphics: Nvidia GeForce ULP GPU
- Connectivity: Wi-Fi a/b/g/n; Ethernet; USB 3.0
- Website: madcatz.com/mojo/

MOJO, stylized as M.O.J.O., is an Android-based video game microconsole manufactured by Mad Catz.

The system runs unmodified Android and connects directly to the Google Play online store. As such, it can play any game designed or previously purchased for Android instead of those specifically designed for the console. The console was released on December 10, 2013, in the United States and United Kingdom.

== Development ==
The console was announced as "Project Mojo" in a Mad Catz's June 6, 2013, investor release. The company revealed the system and its new name, MOJO, at E3 2013. Mad Catz CEO Darren Richardson described the console as the "keystone product" in their GameSmart initiative, a series of mobile gaming accessories for smartphones that can work with a variety of devices and platforms with Bluetooth. The announcement stressed hardware performance and an open platform. Mad Catz said that the console would be released in holiday 2013. In early October 2013, they announced that the console would be released on December 10, 2013, and would be available for 249 USD although it would be available only in limited quantities at launch. They also revealed the hardware specifications of the console.

== Post-release development ==
In January 2014, rooting the console was made available by MoDaCo mod and rooting the console was supported by Mad Catz. In March 2014, Mad Catz announced a price drop for the console after which the console cost $199.99 in USA and £179 in UK. Additionally, as part of the Ouya Everywhere deal, Mad Catz announced that all of Ouya's gaming content would be available in spring 2014. In June 2014, streaming OnLive games was made available through an app that allowed players to stream OnLive's games and their own games using the OnLive's CloudLift feature. On June 30, 2014, an update added the Ouya Everywhere feature allowing players to play OUYA games on MOJO. The update also added 4K UHD output for games and videos. On January 22, 2015, the price of the console was further dropped to $149.99 in USA, £119 in UK and €149 across Europe.

The M.O.J.O. Game Store was shut down on June 25, 2019.
