= Andrew House =

Welsh businessman

- Born: 23 January 1965 (age 61); Wales, United Kingdom
- Education: BA in English language and literature, Oriel College, Oxford University

Andrew House (born 23 January 1965) is a Welsh businessman and the former chair of Sony Interactive Entertainment (SIE). He previously served as President and Global CEO of SIE. House started working for Sony Computer Corporation in 1990, working in the Tokyo-based corporate communications department. Five years later in 1995, he transferred to SCEI's marketing and communications to contribute to the launch of the PlayStation gaming system. In March 1996, he was promoted to Vice President of Marketing at Sony Computer Entertainment America (SCEA), then promoted again in 2002 to Executive Vice President of SCEA. From 2005 to 2009, Andrew House was the chief marketing officer of the Sony Corporation. From 2009 until 2011, House was co-CEO and then CEO of Sony Computer Entertainment Europe (SCEE), then became President and Group CEO of SCEI, replacing Kaz Hirai. In 2013, House led the conference which revealed the PlayStation 4. In 2017 House announced he would step down as head of Sony Interactive Entertainment at year end.

House is fluent in Japanese.
