= Microconsole =

Type of video game console

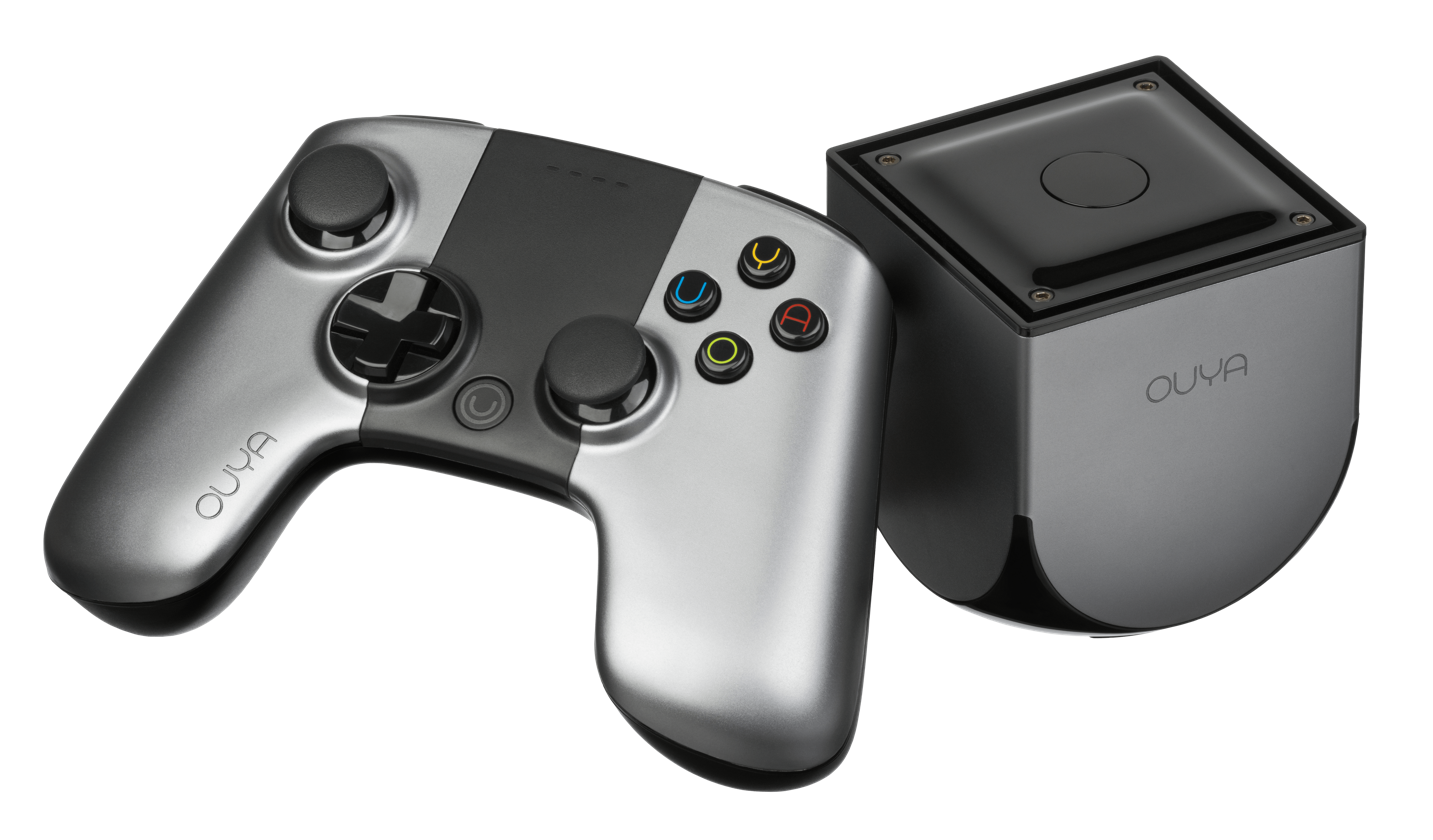
The Ouya is an inexpensive microconsole based on Android.

A microconsole is a home video game console that is typically powered by low-cost computing hardware, making the console lower-priced compared to other home consoles on the market. The majority of microconsoles, with a few exceptions such as the PlayStation TV and OnLive Game System, are Android-based digital media players that are bundled with gamepads and marketed as gaming devices. Such microconsoles can be connected to the television to play video games downloaded from an application store such as Google Play.

== Origins ==
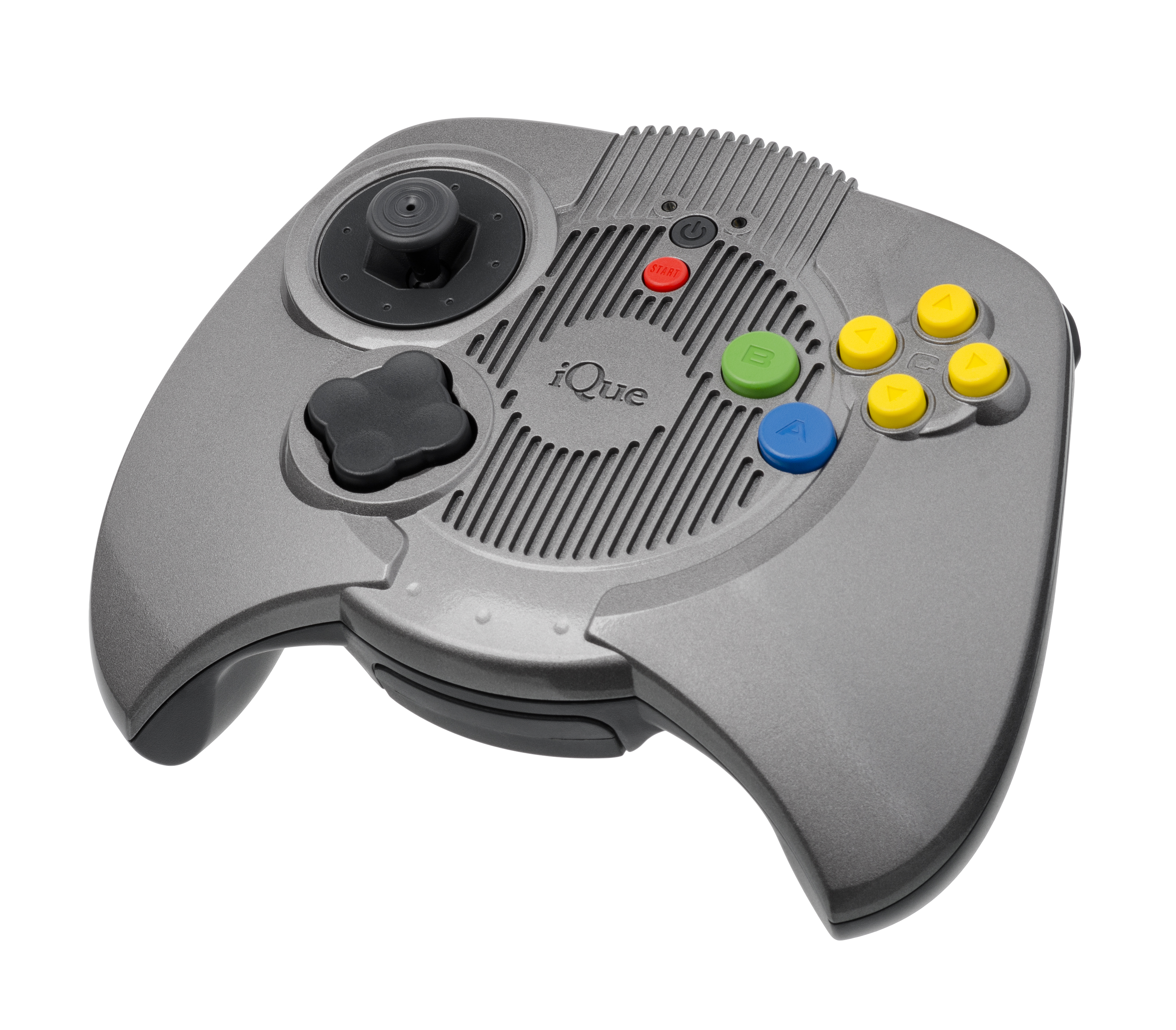
The iQue Player connects to the television and enabled downloading of games at home as early as 2004.

The iQue Player was released in 2003 as a low-cost handheld TV game console based on the Nintendo 64, specifically designed for the Chinese market. At launch, games were available for download from iQue Depot kiosks. In October 2004, the iQue@Home application store was introduced, allowing users to download games from home, potentially making it the first microconsole of its kind.

In the early 2010s, shortly after the rise of mobile gaming on smartphones and tablet devices from 2008, microconsoles started to gain traction in the global market. These units were seen as a means to marry the idea of home video game consoles with smartphone and tablet gaming, taking advantage of the large library of games already available for the Android operating system. While OnLive's MicroConsole brought the name "microconsole" to the field, the term "microconsole" was more widely adapted to describe these units as a whole as it mirrored the concept of microcomputers of the 1970s and 1980s compared to mainframes and minicomputers. Just as microcomputers represented low-cost, less powerful, and smaller form-factor versions of their larger equivalents, microconsoles tend to be similarly available at lower cost using cheaper computation hardware and packaged in smaller systems. In some cases, these packages were small enough to be encased into handheld controllers.

In late 2010, cloud gaming startup OnLive released MicroConsole, a television adapter and wireless gamepad that connects the company's video game streaming service to televisions. VentureBeat's Dean Takahashi described the device as representing the company founder's "vision to turn the video game industry upside down" as an inexpensive console providing "high-end games on low-end hardware" that could eliminate the cycle of regular consumer hardware upgrades. The MicroConsole TV adapter was produced at a loss. OnLive's MicroConsole made the company an early leader in the nascent microconsole field.

Amid a "new war for TV" in the consumer electronics industry, an inexpensive and simple Android-based video game console designed for televisions called Ouya was announced for crowdfunding in July 2012. The Ouya was an overnight success and raised $8.5 million. Significant interest in low-cost Android console gaming followed Ouya's success, spurred by the mobile games industry growth. The industry began to refer to the resulting consoles as alternative consoles, or microconsoles.

Polygon had reported that Android "consoles" were best-in-show at the January 2013 Consumer Electronics Show, citing devices like the MOGA Pro, Green Throttle Games Atlas controller, Nvidia Shield, and news of Valve's Steam Machine, a non-Android console. Following Ouya's success, other similar set-top Android gaming devices were announced as direct competitors, including the GameStick in early 2013, GamePop in May 2013, and Mad Catz's MOJO in June 2013. Forbes's Daniel Nye Griffiths referred to Ouya and GameStick's close release dates as the microconsole field's first "showdown". The GamePop and MOJO announcements in the early summer referred to the devices as "microconsoles".

The PlayStation TV (known in Asia as the PlayStation Vita TV) is a microconsole announced in September 2013 at a Sony Computer Entertainment Japan presentation. It was released in Japan on November 14, 2013, and in North America on October 14, 2014.

== Home-made consoles ==
Raspberry Pi has become a popular alternative platform for home-made microconsoles due to its low cost and ability to emulate retro gaming consoles. While homebrew software for the Raspberry Pi can be made by anyone, users can install a complete emulation package, such as RetroArch or RetroPie.

== Reception ==
Gamasutra called Ouya, GameStick, and GamePop "console alternatives" that represent "a potential new market space for developers". Tadhg Kelly, writing for Edge, called 2013 "the year of the microconsole", citing less consumer need for traditional console power, the low price of microconsole manufacture, increased system compatibility for easier game development, and more developer freedom from console business interests. Microconsole promises of a less restrictive platform are expected to empower independent game developers. Kelly referred to the "deliberately small" microconsoles as "the netbooks of the console world", not intended to compete with big video game consoles. Other reviewers called the microconsoles competitors, though not a threat, and referred to a crowded "non-traditional console space" as a disadvantage. Kelly added that Ouya is heavily focused on the early adopter audience and its interests, and that Ouya's "natural advantage" of price has not been communicated effectively. Edge questioned possibilities of microconsole success due to competition within the field as well as from Nintendo, Sony, and Microsoft's new consoles.

The pre-release Ouya was panned by early reviewers. The Verge called it unfinished, and in a later review, Eurogamer questioned why consumers would purchase a console that duplicated the functionality of smartphones they already had.

The video game industry saw Apple's Apple TV as potential microconsole competition due to the company's experience in the mobile games market. Polygon reported in January 2013 that the Apple TV "continue[d] to be dangerously close to upending the mobile gaming space" and speculated that an Apple TV App Store could spark "a rush of games to the television".

== See also ==
- List of microconsoles
- Cloud gaming – Streaming of video games as video to clients via cloud computing
- Dedicated console – Type of video game console
- Handheld game console – Portable self-contained video game console
- Handheld TV game – Type of video game console
- Mobile game – Video game played on a mobile device
- Video game clone – Video game that resembles another video game
