= LiquidSky =

- Industry: Cloud visualization
- Founded: 2014; 12 years ago
- Founders: Ian McLoughlin, Scott Johnston
- Defunct: December 17, 2018
- Headquarters: New York City

LiquidSky was a New York City–based provider of cloud visualization, acquired by Walmart in 2018. The company's flagship product was a cloud gaming service of the same name, launched on March 24, 2017, and shut down in 2018. Announced at Consumer Electronics Show 2017, the service aimed to tackle issues that other providers struggle with, including latency and input lag. Its major competitors include Sony's PlayStation Now and NVIDIA's GeForce Now for PC and Mac.

== History ==
The company was founded in 2014 by Ian McLoughlin and Scott Johnston as LiquidSky Software Inc. Prior to founding LiquidSky, McLoughlin had expressed displeasure of how existing cloud gaming solutions handled latency and input lag, particularly OnLive. Ian stated that his goal when founding LiquidSky was to offer a service with minimal latency and input lag, thus offering a cleaner experience for gamers.

Testing began sometime around late 2014, with the company quietly bringing in waves of testers to try out the service. The company found success, raising almost $12 million in funding for the service.

At the 2017 Consumer Electronics Show, after roughly two years of testing, McLoughlin and the company announced that the service would be launching in Q1 2017, with an ad-supported plan, upgraded datacenter hardware, and a redesigned client. Other shown off included concepts for standalone hardware and demo footage of Battlefield 1 running at 60 FPS. Originally slated for release on March 14, 2017, it was delayed to March 24, 2017, due to server issues and launched with support for Microsoft Windows. On July 11, 2017, LiquidSky updated their Android client to reflect the launch of the service. The company stated that support for macOS was in development.

LiquidSky shut down their service on December 17, 2018, while they focus their efforts on building a new streaming platform.

As of 2018, LiquidSky was acquired by Walmart and now focusing on other projects.

== Features ==
Among the features stated for LiquidSky were low latency, fast intranet speeds, up-to-date hardware, and different storage plans.

The service had 6 datacenters worldwide, including:

- San Jose, California
- Dallas, Texas
- Washington, DC
- London, England
- Frankfurt, Germany
- Hong Kong

Datacenters in Madras, India; Tokyo, Japan; Seoul, South Korea; Sydney, Australia; and Mexico were available at launch, but were discontinued due to lack of user adoption compared to more developed countries. Additionally, the platform lacked local language translation, faced VAT taxes, and payment processing fees for the centers.

== Reception ==
LiquidSky has received attention from various online news outlets, including Engadget, VentureBeat, Time, IGN, PCGamer, and PCGamesN, with many claiming that the service succeeded where previous services such as OnLive failed.
