= Rogue Galaxy =

2005 video game

- European cover art
- Developer: Level-5 (Note: Additional work by Japan Studio)
- Publisher: Sony Computer Entertainment
- Directors: Akihiro Hino; Takeshi Akasaka
- Producers: Akihiro Hino; Kentaro Motomura
- Designer: Akihiro Hino
- Programmers: Usuke Kumagi; Mamoru Itagaki; Takayuki Kobayashi
- Artist: Takeshi Majima
- Writers: Akihiro Hino; Koji Hiro
- Composer: Tomohito Nishiura
- Platform: PlayStation 2
- Release: JP: December 8, 2005; Director's Cut: NA: January 30, 2007; AU: September 6, 2007; JP: March 21, 2007; EU: September 7, 2007
- Genre: Action role-playing
- Mode: Single-player

Rogue Galaxy (Note: Rogue Galaxy (Japanese: ローグギャラクシー, Hepburn: Rōgugyarakushī)) is an action role-playing video game developed by Level-5 and published by Sony Computer Entertainment for the PlayStation 2. It was originally released exclusively in Japan in December 2005; a director's cut of the game with enhancements and changes was released in 2007 for North America in January, Japan in March and PAL territories in September.

The game follows the adventures of Jaster Rogue, a young agricultural worker living on an isolated planet, who becomes involved in a galactic conflict, and learns the fate of the entire galaxy lies in his hands. At the time of its release, Rogue Galaxy was the largest game Level-5 had ever developed, both in terms of the number of staff working on it and the length of production (over three years). Both Level-5 and Sony had strong expectations for the game, hoping it would challenge the RPG market dominance of the Final Fantasy and Dragon Quest franchises.

Rogue Galaxy received generally positive reviews, with critics praising the graphics, range of side quests and scope of the game, but some were critical of the plot and character development. Although the game went on to win several gaming awards, it did not sell as well as had been hoped, failing to meet Sony's expectations of selling one million units.

== Gameplay ==
Rogue Galaxy is an action role-playing game played from a third-person perspective in which the player moves through a continuous environment, with no load time between overworld exploration and combat. Battles occur as random encounters, a la traditional role-playing video games such as Square's Final Fantasy X or Level-5's own Dragon Quest VIII: Journey of the Cursed King, but unlike such games, which feature turn-based combat, Rogue Galaxy uses a real-time hack and slash combat system in which the player fights with a party of three characters. The player has direct control over only one character, although which character this is can be changed at any time. The two NPCs fight independently of the player character, based on the strategy selected prior to the battle. Available strategies include fighting very aggressively, targeting a specific enemy, or not fighting at all. The strategy can also be changed at any time during the battle. Additionally, the player can issue specific orders to the NPCs during combat, such as having them use an item or activate one of their special abilities. NPC allies will also offer advice to the player character, such as suggesting they perform a special move or use a particular item. The player is given a choice of either ignoring the advice, or picking one of the available options. NPCs will not perform any special moves or use items unless the player tells them to, or has selected a particular strategy prior to the battle.

Battle screen from the North American version of Rogue Galaxy. The party's stats are on the bottom of the screen, showing information such as their hit points, ability points and action gauge. The status of the player character's primary and second weapon are indicated on the top left of the screen. The party's battle strategy is shown just to the right of this.

During combat, each character has an "Action Gauge", which decrease with each action taken. When it is empty, the player can no longer attack, and must wait for the gauge to automatically refill, or instantly refill by successfully blocking an enemy attack. Each character's secondary weapon has its own individual gauge, which depletes with each use, and must be automatically refilled before the weapon can be used again. This gauge is independent of the attack gauge, and during combat it can only be refilled a certain number of times before the secondary weapon is no longer available for use.

As well as fighting independently of one another, and performing their own unique abilities, players can also perform team abilities, although the correct characters must be active in the battle for a particular team ability to be available for use. The player also has a special attack, the "Burning Strike". In the original Japanese release, the Burning Strike occurred at random irrespective of the player's actions, but this was altered for the North American and European versions to allow the player to choose when to use the attack. Once enough "Burning Chips" have been collected from slain enemies, the player can activate the Burning Strike whenever they wish. The player must then follow a series of button prompts to string together combo attacks, which deal more damage the more attacks are successfully chained.

When the game begins, the storyline follows a linear path, but at a certain point, the game world opens up, and the player is free to move from planet to planet using the pirate ship, Dorgenark. In the overworld, the player can move around by walking, but can also transport from any activated save point on the map to any other activated point on that planet, although they cannot transport to a save point on another planet.

=== Revelation Flow ===
Deego's Revelation Flow chart. He has just gained the ability "Flash Bomb, Level 3" after filling in a group with the requisite items.

Character abilities and power-ups are handled via a feature called the "Revelation Flow". Similar to the "Sphere Grid" in Final Fantasy X and the "License Board" in Final Fantasy XII, the Revelation Flow is not based on a traditional experience point/leveling up system. Instead of characters gaining pre-determined statistical bonuses as they increase in level, they gain abilities and stat increases by placing items in the Revelation Flow. Once all of the prerequisite items have been placed, the particular ability/stat increase becomes available. Each character has their own unique Revelation Flow, with a different layout, different abilities and different item requirements.

=== Weapons ===
The game features a "Weapon Synthesis" system similar to Dark Cloud and Dark Chronicle, which allows the player to combine weapons. For every victory in battle, each weapon carried by active characters gains experience points. When a weapon has gained a certain amount of experience, it becomes "Maxed". After a weapon is maxed, it continues to gain additional experience in specific elemental categories - fire, ice, lightning, wind, and holy. When the experience and the elemental damage are both at maximum, a weapon is "Mastered" and cannot be improved any further. Once a weapon is maxed, it becomes available for synthesis with another maxed weapon of the same type. When two maxed weapons are synthesized, a stronger weapon is created, and must be maxed again to become available for subsequent synthesis.

Synthesis is carried out by a character within the game called "Toady", a frog who can swallow two weapons and then regurgitate a new weapon. Toady can also analyze maxed weapons and make suggestions for synthesis combinations. These suggestions are recorded in the "Frog Log". Toady will also warn the player if an attempted combination is going to result in a decrease in stats, or with a weapon for which the player's level is not yet high enough.

=== Sidequests ===
The game features numerous optional gameplay elements beyond the main storyline. For example, early in the game, the player can begin to compete in the "Insectron Tournament". Similar to Dark Chronicle's fishing mini-game, the player must capture and breed Insectrons (bugs), which can then be entered into a tournament where they fight other Insectrons, in a manner similar to a game of chess. Once an Insectron has been captured, the player can increase its stats by feeding it certain food or breeding it with another Insectron of the opposite sex. The Insectron Tournament awards prizes as the player move through the various ranks.

Another sidequest is "Factory". At a later point in the game, the player gains access to a reconfigurable factory. By talking to specific characters in the overworld, the player can acquire blueprints, which can be used to assemble specific equipment and raw materials so as to make new items, which then become available for purchase in the various shops throughout the game.

A further sidequest is "Challenge battles", which occur randomly throughout the game. In these battles, specific conditions must be met, such as finishing the battle without taking damage, finishing within a certain time limit, using only one character, or not using any items or abilities. If the player wins the battle and fulfills the condition, they receive a "Hunter Coin". These coins can be used to purchase different levels of "Hunter Licenses", which are required in some shops to purchase certain items. Additionally, the higher the player's license, the lower the prices for general items.

The game also includes a "Hunter Ranking" system whereby the player is awarded "Hunter Points" for killing a specific number of particular enemies. As the player's rank increases, prizes are awarded. Tied into the hunter system are "Quarries" - mini-bosses which award a lot of hunter points. Unlike standard monsters, quarries must be purchased before they become available. Once the player has purchased the quarry, they must locate it on the map and then use a specific item to initiate the battle.

The game also features a completion chart, which records the player's progress through various aspects of gameplay: "Hunter Ranking" (the goal is to top the league of hunters), "Rare Items" (collect all nine rare items in the game), "Quarries" (successfully defeat all available quarries), "Hunting Record" (attain maximum hunter points by killing all of the specified enemies), "Insectron" (win the highest tournament rank), "Revelation Flow" (complete every character's Revelation Flow), "Frog Log" (have Toady analyze at least one-hundred weapons and produce at least fifty), and "Factory" (produce all forty items available in the factory). When any single aspect is completed to 100%, an award is given, usually in the form of a new costume for one of the characters.

== Story ==
=== Characters ===
- Jaster Rogue

Voiced by: Hiroshi Tamaki (Japanese); Will Friedle (English)
The game's protagonist and the main playable character. Jaster is seventeen years old, and has a distinctive birthmark on his cheek. He lives on the planet of Rosa with his adoptive father, Raul (Peter Renaday), where he works in the agricultural sector. Resentful of the presence on the planet of the Longardian army, he yearns to leave and explore space. He is given just such an opportunity when he encounters the crew of the intergalactic pirate ship Dorgenark.

- Kisala

Voiced by: Aya Ueto (Japanese); Natalie Lander (English)
The adopted daughter of Dorgengoa (Fred Tatasciore), captain of the Dorgenark.

- Zegram Ghart

Voiced by: Kazuhiro Yamaji (Japanese); Steve Blum (English)
A former bounty hunter who joined the Dorgenark's crew several years prior to the beginning of the game.

- Simon Wicard

Voiced by: Masaya Onosaka (Japanese); Greg Ellis (English)
A member of the Dorgenark's crew. Cheerful and optimistic, he wears a mask and speaks in a heavy Scottish accent.

- Steve

Voiced by: Hideyuki Umezu (Japanese); Yuri Lowenthal (English)
An android created by Dr. Pocacchio (Marc Graue), he is the navigator of the Dorgenark.

- Lilika Rhyza

Voiced by: Kikuko Inoue (Japanese); Kari Wahlgren (English)
A warrior from the planet Juraika, Lilika joins the Dorgenark's crew shortly after Jaster.

- Deego Aegis

Voiced by: Unshō Ishizuka (Japanese); David Sobolov (English)
A former elite soldier for the Longardian army, he has a robotic arm, and yearns for peace in the galaxy.

- Jupis Tooki McGanel

Voiced by: Yutaka Aoyama (Japanese); Ben Diskin (English)
A lizard-like alien known as a Granshee. Regarded as the greatest hacker in the galaxy, he is a former scientist who devoted his life's work to the spaceship manufacturing megacorporation Daytron.

- Desert Claw

Voiced by: Koichi Yamadera (Japanese); Andy Chanley (English)
The galaxy's most famous bounty hunter. When the game begins, the crew of the Dorgenark are looking to hire him.

=== Plot ===
The game begins with Jaster foraging in the desert outside his home town of Salgin on the planet Rosa. Meanwhile, Simon and Steve arrive in Salgin looking for Desert Claw. As Jaster returns, he complains to his adopted father, Raul, about the presence of the Longardian Federation on the planet, who are ostensibly there to protect it from the Draxian Empire. As they talk, a beast attacks the town. Jaster rushes outside and is attacked by a group of smaller beasts. With the help of a stranger, he fights them off, and they head to face the main beast. Upon seeing Steve and Simon, the stranger leaves Jaster, giving him his sword. Steve recognizes the sword as Desert Claw's sword, "Desert Seeker - one of the Seven Sacred Galactic Swords" and concludes that Jaster is Desert Claw. As such, they join him in fighting the beast. They defeat it, and Steve tells Jaster their boss wants to hire him. When Jaster learns they are space pirates working for the legendary Dorgengoa, he decides to join, maintaining the ruse that he is Desert Claw.

On board, he meets Kisala, Zegram and the chief mate, Monsha (Quinton Flynn). While passing the Rose Nebula on their way to Zerard, the Dorgenark is attacked by beasts and crashes on the jungle planet Juraika, where they meet Lilika, a member of the local Burkaqua tribe, who joins the crew. They resume their journey to Zerard, where they renew the ship's galactic travel visa from the Galaxy Corporation, after a stint in Rosencaster Prison, and the inadvertent recruitment of Jupis to the ship's crew.

Meanwhile, Dorgengoa sees Jaster for the first time, immediately recognizing he is not Desert Claw. He orders Jaster be thrown overboard, but Kisala refuses to allow it. Dorgengoa decides to test Jaster's ability. He reveals that he is seeking the lost planet of Eden, which is said to have disappeared 10,000 years ago. The key to finding Eden is the "Great Tablets", which are also lost, and for which Dorgengoa is searching. A tablet is believed to have been recently excavated on the planet Vedan. The crew head to the Vedanian mining town of Myna. There they meet Deego and his girlfriend Angela (Heather Halley). Deego helps the group get into the mines, but not in time to save the tablet from Daytron, who take it to Rosa. Deego decides to join the crew of the Dorgenark, and Angela promises to wait for him to return.

The party arrives on Rosa and heads to the ruins in the Sylvazard Desert. The Tablet arrives and three pedestals are revealed, on which must be set three "Key Pieces". Meanwhile, Daytron president Valkog Drazer (David Lodge) and his assistant, Norma Kissleigh (Michelle Ruff), arrive with Seed (Jason Spisak), a masked servant, who engages the crew in battle. They are unable to defeat him but are rescued by Desert Claw, who promptly leaves again. On the Dorgenark, they tell Dorgengoa about the pedestals, and Deego guesses the Key Pieces are probably located within the three Ruins of the Ancient Kings.

The party manages to acquire the three Key Pieces, and Jaster places them on the pedestals, transforming the Tablet into a massive three-dimensional puzzle structure. Seed begins an incantation and sets about manipulating the structure, but he proves unable to solve the puzzle and transforms into a massive beast. He attacks the party, but Jaster unleashes a ferocious power, defeating him. Jaster then uses his power to solve the puzzle, opening the gates to a labyrinth. Deego speculates Jaster may be a descendant of the Star King, an ancient king who ruled the entire galaxy 50,000 years ago. After opening the labyrinth, a confused Jaster returns to normal, and the crew enter.

Inside, they encounter Ragnar (Chris Edgerly), a robot who explains Kisala is actually Princess Irieth of Mariglenn, the planet also known as Eden. He gives her the key to open the Gates of Eden. Meanwhile, the Daytron flagship, the Emperor, attacks Salgin. Valkog demands the key from Jaster who is about to acquiesce, when Raul fires an electromagnetic pulse at the Emperor, partially disabling it. The ship fires on Raul's church before retreating. Raul dies in Jaster's arms after giving him an artifact that points to the apparently deserted Kuje Desert. In the middle of Kuje, the party finds a village, Joannasburg. There, they meet the spirit of the long-dead Joanna (C. C. Seymour), who explains that she is a descendant of the Star King, as is her son Jaster. Desert Claw arrives, telling Jaster he is his father. He gave Jaster to Raul while he prepared for the day when Jaster would awaken the power of the Star King and open the Gates of Eden.

Jaster uses the key and a space portal appears above Rosa. After passing through, the crew Mariglenn, where they are greeted by Queen Freidias (Wendee Lee), who tells Kisala she is her mother. Freidias then tells the story of Mariglenn; tens of thousands of years ago, the planet was attacked by evil energy known as Rune, which possesses the power to turn living beings into beasts. Mother, the essence of Rune, took control of the planet, and the people realized that once Mariglenn was destroyed, Mother would move onto another planet, eventually destroying the entire galaxy. As such, Freidias sealed Mariglenn into a "space-time cleft". Only one person can defeat Mother – the Star King.

The crew travel to Ti'atha Forest where they encounter the spirit of Kisala's father, King Albioth (Fred Tatasciore). Albioth had faced Mother, but lost and had turned into a beast. He tells them the only way she can be defeated is by neutralizing the power of her Rune, using Drigellum energy, which can only be found in the hearts of good people. Each of the party's hearts generates Drigellum, which is forged into a sword. The party enter Mother's lair and fight her. Jaster again releases the power of the Star King. He reveals Mother as being a sorceress named Ilzarbella (Wendee Lee) who served the Star King until she was seduced by the power of Rune. Using the Drigellum sword, the Star King/Jaster kills her. As soon as the battle ends, the Emperor arrives with the intention of collecting the Rune energy to create beasts so as to continue the war, but Rune takes over the ship, killing Valkog and Norma, and integrating them into an organic vessel which it uses to attack Jaster and his group. The group split up, with each member attacking a separate part of the ship, eventually defeating it.

Mariglenn returns to its former self, and Kisala says goodbye to Freidias. When they return to their own galaxy, the group finds Mariglenn has reappeared. They visit and the Mariglenndians appoint Kisala as their new queen, much to the disappointment of Dorgengoa and Jaster as they are told to never see her again because they are commoners to them. As Jaster and Monsha discuss the newly established galactic peace, Kisala is inaugurated as the new queen. Meanwhile, Simon returns to his family, Lilika returns to Bukaqua, Deego reunites with Angela, Steve returns to work with Dr. Pocacchio, Jupis resumes his scientific research, and Zegram remains on the Dorgenark. Later, Dorgenoa tells Jaster they are returning to Mariglenn to get back Kisala. The game ends with a narration saying the crew made off with their "ultimate treasure" in what was their last heist, implying that they succeeded in getting Kisala, but are on the run from Mariglenn.

== Development ==
A cutscene showing Jaster speaking with Kisala. This image demonstrates the "tonal rendering" graphical style used by Level-5 in the game; cel-shaded 3D graphics for the foreground characters, set against detailed, realistic backgrounds.

Rogue Galaxy was first hinted in August 2003, when Level-5 revamped its website, and included a single image for a "New RPG". No further information was provided, although, at the time, some thought the game might be the rumored Dark Cloud 3. Nothing more was heard until February 2005, when Level-5 president Akihiro Hino revealed that "New RPG" was going to be released for the PlayStation 2, quelling rumors the game was being developed for the PlayStation Portable. The name was revealed in July, when it was also revealed that the game would feature cel-shaded graphics in the style of previous Level-5 games, such as Dark Chronicle and Dragon Quest VIII: Journey of the Cursed King. Level-5 refer to the technique as "tonal rendering" - a mixture of cel-shaded 3D graphics for the main characters, set against detailed, realistic backgrounds. Hino was director of the project. The game was officially unveiled in July at the PlayStation Meeting in Tokyo, where Hino said it had been in development for the past two and a half years, with its development time overlapping that of Dragon Quest VIII. He also revealed the game was the biggest project Level-5 had ever worked on, both in terms of production length and the number of staff working on the project.

"As a creator, I always wanted to create a title that was as big as Dragon Quest or Final Fantasy. I believe Rogue Galaxy is on the same scale. This title will be our challenge to all the RPGs in the world".

— Akihiro Hino; writer/designer/producer/director

In an August interview with Famitsu, Hino explained the gameplay involves the player travelling the galaxy and visiting various planets, each of which has its own unique visual theme. He claimed the total volume of areas to explore in the game would surpass any RPG to date. Originally, he had planned to feature a "virtually uncountable number of planets", which would be procedurally generated as the player explored them, but this concept was later modified to a smaller number of planets, each with multiple locations. He revealed a major selling point of the game to be no loading times between exploration and combat, or when moving from one location to another, something which had never before been accomplished on a disc-based RPG, and something which had been a long-time personal goal of his. He also went into detail about the backgrounds of Jaster, Kisala, Zegram and Lilika, and he explained the basic combat system (a hack and slash system using three party members, with the player able to issue commands to the two NPCs), the Revelation Flow system, and some basic information about the Factory system.

"Level-5 was created for swords and magic fantasies, but we got bored with the consistently similar worlds, so we wanted to try something new".

— Kentaro Motomura; producer

A trailer for the game was released in August, as was basic plot information, and the game's website went live that month. A playable demo of the game was made available at the Tokyo Game Show in September. IGN's Anoop Gantayat was impressed with the "seamless" gameplay, and the absence of load times, although he did note the frame rate was lower than Dragon Quest VIII. He was also impressed with the graphics: "The game doesn't hide the vastness of its world, with plenty of distant views as you explore the complicated landscapes. One may actually get the feeling of existing in the expansive world of a massively multiplayer online RPG rather than the limited world of standard RPG".

The game was released in Japan on December 8, with no date set for North American or European releases. Both IGN and GameSpot played an import copy of the game, and both were impressed. Gantayat again praised the absence of loading times, arguing "the technical feats this game pulls off with the grey and limping PS2 hardware are impressive". He praised the pre-rendered CG cutscenes, and the smooth transition from these scenes to the gameplay itself. GameSpot's Bethany Massimilla wrote that "the visual style of the game is strongly inspired by cel-shading techniques, but the characters here aren't the flat and cartoony sort that you might ordinarily associate with the cel-shaded style. They exist and move in full 3D with lots of attention to detail in their attire and their movement, and they look great".

=== Music ===
The game's music was composed, arranged, and produced by Tomohito Nishiura. The two-disc, sixty-one track Rogue Galaxy Original Soundtrack, was released in Japan on January 25, 2006 by King Records. The title's ending vocal track, "Dreaming My Way Home", is composed by Nishiura, and arranged and performed by Barbara Kessler. GameSpot wrote that "Rogue Galaxy's soundtrack is a robust and varied assortment of tunes that fit its epic scale".

On the same day, the single-disk, ten-track Rogue Galaxy Premium Arrange was published in Japan by TEAM Entertainment. Consisting of remixes of some of the tracks from the game, the album featured contributions from some of the Japanese video game industry's top composers, including Yasunori Mitsuda, Shinji Hosoe, Kenji Ito, Yoko Shimomura, Nobuyoshi Sano, Yoshitaka Hirota and Noriyuki Iwadare.

=== Localization improvements ===
In the spring of 2006, Sony Computer Entertainment and Level-5 confirmed the localised version for a North American market. Level-5 revealed that the English language version of the game is much more than a direct translation of the original Japanese version, and also includes multiple new features. Primary amongst these is a new planet with its own storyline, characters and items, as well as gameplay tweaks, such as Burning Strikes no longer happening randomly. Over one-hundred new items and weapons were also added to the game, and numerous character animations are improved. Initially for October 2006, the North American release date had been pushed back to January 2007 to facilitate further refinement.

The producer of the English localization, Nao Higo, called the new version of the game the "perfect version". He explained the team had taken on board criticisms regarding the difficulty of the original game, which was felt to be too easy in some places and too hard in others, and had created a more balanced difficulty level. He also explained the new world, the water world Alistia, is optional, but fully realized, with its own map, storylines, characters, missions and items. Improvements were also made to the graphics of the existing planets. He explained the Insectron minigame includes a multiplayer mode, whereby the player's team of insectrons would generate a code, which could be given to another player. When the second player enters the code in "Battle mode" at the Insectron tournament, they can use their team to fight the first player's team.

Other improvements include:

- The game is now housed on a double-layer 8.5GB DVD instead of the original 4.7GB DVD, which allows smoother graphics and additional data.
- Toady's weapon analysis is easier to use.
- The "Burning Strike" system has been altered. Players now collect Burning Chips during battle, which allows them to store power, and execute their Burning Strike when they wish. In the original game, the Burning Strikes happened randomly. The input section of the ability has also been changed, with full animations for each character as they perform each attack, and different animations for each character's five-hit, seven-hit, and nine-hit attacks.
- The layout and visual design of several dungeons and planets has been altered and improved, specifically Salgin, Rosencaster Prison, the Daytron factory, the Ruins on Rosa and the Gladius Towers.
- Two new species of Insectron have been added: the "Bomber Snail" and the "Spidan", each with eight types of Insectron per species.
- Each character has four additional costumes, except for Kisala and Simon, who have five each.
- Over 2000 lines of additional voiced dialogue has been added.
- Each character has three new abilities on their Revelation Flow, except for Lilika, who has four. Two new Combination abilities have also been added that team up Kisala with Lilika and Steve with Jupis.

=== PlayStation 4 re-release ===
Sony released the emulated PlayStation 4 version of the game in December 2015, featuring 1080p graphics via up-rendering, trophy support, both Remote Play and Share Play compatibility and second screen support for the PlayStation Vita and PlayStation App.

== Reception ==
Reception

Aggregate score
Aggregator	Score
Metacritic	83/100

Review scores
Publication	Score
Eurogamer	7/10
Famitsu	36/40
GameRevolution	B
GameSpot	8/10
GameSpy	4.5/5
GameTrailers	8/10
IGN	8.7/10

Awards
Publication	Award
CESA Game Awards	Future Award (2005)
Digital Contents Grandprix	Excellence in Digital Content (2006)
Famitsu	Best RPG (2006)
Famitsu	Special Rookie Award (2006)

Rogue Galaxy received "generally favorable reviews" according to the review aggregation website Metacritic.

Although Eurogamer's Simon Parkin praised the graphics and range of mini-games and side-quests, he felt the game's release after Final Fantasy XII placed an unrealizable burden of expectation upon it, saying that Rogue Galaxy did not put new conventions to the genre compared to the former.

Game Revolution's Tim Tackett was critical of the plot and characters, but praised the range of side-quests, the battle system, the graphics and the Revelation Flow, which he found superior to the License Board of Final Fantasy XII.

GameTrailers was also critical of the plot, but praised the gameplay and variety of side-quests, and said that the fans of RPG genre will find something addictive and worthwhile in Rogue Galaxy.

GameSpot's Greg Kasavin had mixed feelings about the combat system, considering to be repetitive and that the battles in the game are not varied. Although he did not consider it as a "stunning accomplishment" compared to some previous high-quality RPG games on PS2, he felt that the game does differently or better than most of its predecessors on some other aspects, such as graphics, and ultimately gave it a positive review.

IGN's Jeremy Dunham praised the graphics, the battle system, the range of side quests and mini-games, but was somewhat critical of teammate AI and story. He said that its mixture of "strong" combat mechanics, "addictive" sidequests, and "stunning" visual style will delight RPG fans.

GameSpy's Patrick Joynt's main criticism concerned the lack of character development, but he praised the range of mini-games and side-quests, graphics, combat system, and the overall size of the game.

=== Sales and awards ===
Prior to the release of the game, Sony Computer Entertainment corporate executive Masatsuka Saeki had hoped it would sell a million units. Although it was the top-selling video game in Japan during the week ending on December 11, 2005, selling 237,631 units, by the end of 2006, the game had sold only 356,192 units. In 2007, Rogue Galaxy: Director's Cut sold a further 29,457 units.

The game won a "Future Award" at the CESA Game Awards (2005) and an "Excellence in Digital Content" award at the Digital Contents Grandprix (2006). At the Famitsu Awards in 2006, it won both "Best RPG" and a "Special Rookie Award". It was named "Game of the Month" for January 2007 and given an "Editor's Choice" award by IGN, who, in 2010, placed it at #53 in their "Top 100 PlayStation 2 Games" list. It was also given an "Editor's Choice" award by GameSpy.

During the 11th Annual Interactive Achievement Awards, the Academy of Interactive Arts & Sciences named Rogue Galaxy as one of the nominees for 2007's "Role-Playing Game of the Year", but eventually lost to Mass Effect.
