= Gamevice =

Tablet and tablet peripherals manufacturer specializing in gaming products

Gamevice, Inc.
- Founders: Matthew Joynes; James Bower; Brendan Iribe
- Headquarters: Suite 200, 685 Cochran Street, Simi Valley, California, U.S.
- Website: gamevice.com

Gamevice, Inc. (formerly Wikipad, Inc.) is a Simi Valley, California-based tablet and tablet peripherals manufacturer specializing in gaming products.

The debut product was the Wikipad, a proprietary Android tablet hardware engineered for mobile gaming, which featured a detachable controller. Gamevice later came to market with a peripheral-only product, rebranded under the name, Gamevice.

The company was founded by Matthew Joynes, James Bower, and Brendan Iribe. The current CEO is Phillip Hyun.

== History ==
=== Wikipad ===
Wikipad

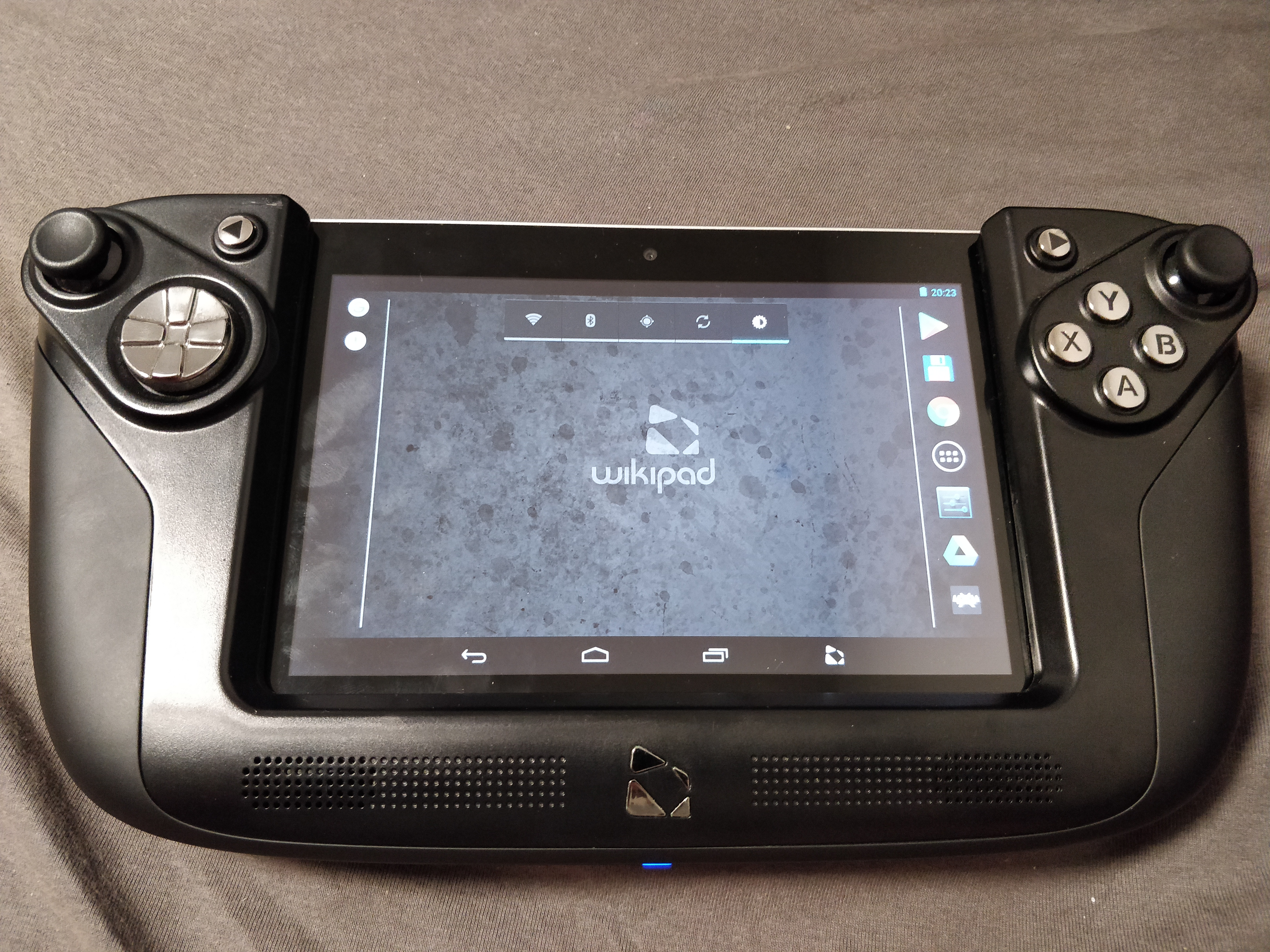
- The first model of Wikipad tablet with game controller attached
- Developer: Wikipad, Inc. (now Gamevice, Inc.)
- Type: Tablet
- Released: June 11, 2013
- Introductory price: US$249
- Controller input: Detachable
- Connectivity: Wi-Fi 802.11 a/b/g/n, HDMI output, Bluetooth 4.0
- Online services: Google Play, PlayStation Mobile, Tegra Zone
- Website: wikipad.com

At the Consumer Electronics Show (CES) in Las Vegas on January 10, 2012, the Wikipad was shown with both a 2D and a glasses-free 3D-enabled device. In May 2012, Gaikai, a cloud gaming service which Sony acquired two months later in July 2012, partnered with Wikipad, Inc. to integrate its streaming service into the tablet.

The Wikipad was originally scheduled for an October 31, 2011 release, but was delayed indefinitely on the day it was originally supposed to be released. The Wikipad was released on June 11, 2013, in the United States with a price tag of $249.

In March 2014, a game control mapping tool was announced for the Wikipad to help map touchscreen game controls to the physical Wikipad controller in an effort to improve gameplay. Also in March, the price of the Wikipad dropped to $199. In June 2014, OnLive cloud gaming support was added to the Wikipad.

==== Reception ====
Eurogamer rated the Wikipad's screen size and intentions as nice, saying it had "its heart in the right place", but decided that the lack of compelling Android games, high launch price, and outdated specs and software limited the appeal of the device.

IGN gave the Wikipad poor reviews taking into consideration the lack of games in its library, flimsy construction, and software that was considered dated, even at the time of the device's release. It concludes that "The Wikipad is a mostly failed attempt at turning an Android tablet into a gaming handheld."

=== Gamevice ===
In January 2014, Wikipad, Inc. announced a new controller called Gamevice to expand its mobile device coverage. The industrial design for the Gamevice controller was developed by RKS Design. Gamevice is a detachable controller with a classic D-pad; twin triggers; A, B, X, and Y buttons; and dual analog sticks.

On January 31, 2017, a new Gamevice controller was released for the iPhone 7. On February 15, 2018, Gamevice announced and launched a Minecraft-themed controller bundle, which includes a Gamevice controller, a carrying case for the controller and a download code for Minecraft on iOS.

== Legal issues ==
In August 2017, Gamevice filed a lawsuit against Nintendo in the United States District Court for the Central District of California, alleging that the design of the Nintendo Switch conflicts with its patent on the design for the Wikipad. The lawsuit sought damages on existing Switch sales and banning further sales of the console. The lawsuit was voluntarily dismissed by Gamevice in October 2017.

However, in March 2018, Gamevice initiated a second patent infringement lawsuit on Nintendo related to a different set of patents. Gamevice also sought action through the United States International Trade Commission related to patent infringement under Section 337 of the Tariff Act of 1930, and was seeking to block imports of the Switch into the United States.

On October 10, 2019, the lawsuit against Nintendo ended, with the U.S. International Trade Commission affirming the conclusion of the presiding administrative law judge's initial determination that no violation of Section 337 had occurred.

On March 27, 2020, Gamevice filed a new patent-infringement lawsuit at the USITC against Nintendo in addition to appealing the previous case that it lost. The lawsuit ended in favor of Nintendo.

== See also ==
- Wii U GamePad
- Archos GamePad
- JXD S7300
- Nvidia Shield
- Nintendo Switch
- Nintendo Switch 2
- PlayStation Portal
- Backbone One
- Backbone Labs
- Razer Inc.
- Nacon
- Turtle Beach Corporation
