= OnLive =

Defunct cloud gaming company

OL2, Inc.
- Logo (2009–2015)
- Type: Private
- Industry: Cloud gaming
- Founded: 2009
- Founder: Steve Perlman
- Defunct: 2012 (original, AfBC liquidation then 'phoenixed') April 2015
- Fate: Patents sold to Sony Interactive Entertainment
- Headquarters: Mountain View, California, United States
- Area served: United States; United Kingdom
- Key people: Mark Jung (Executive Chairman); Gary Lauder (Lead Investor)
- Products: OnLive MicroConsole; OnLive Wireless Controller
- Parent: Lauder Partners
- Website: www.onlive.com

OnLive was a provider of cloud virtualization technologies based in Mountain View, California. OnLive's flagship product was its cloud gaming service, which allowed subscribers to rent or demo computer games without installing them. Games were delivered as streaming video rendered by the service's servers, rather than running on the local device. This setup allowed the games to run on computers and devices that would normally be unable to run them due to insufficient hardware. OnLive also enabled other features such as the ability for players to record game-play and to spectate.

The service was available through clients for personal computers and mobile devices, as well as through smart TVs and a dedicated video game console-styled device known as the OnLive Game System. OnLive also expanded into the cloud desktop market with a sister product, OnLive Desktop—a subscription service offering a cloud-based instance of Windows Server 2008 R2 accessible via tablets.

The OnLive service received a mixed reception. Reviewers noted that the video quality and amount of input lag depended on the Internet connection and varied on a game-by-game basis. Games featuring fast movement or requiring fast reactions could be frustrating to play. On the other hand, the service received accolades for its built-in spectator mode and its ability to trial games without installing them.

Sony Computer Entertainment (now known as Sony Interactive Entertainment) acquired OnLive's patents in April 2015, and all OnLive services were discontinued that month. Sony operated PlayStation Now, a similar service built using the infrastructure of Gaikai, a former competitor to OnLive, until it was merged with PS Plus in 2022.

== Gaming platform ==
OnLive main menu

The game service was available via the OnLive Game System and a number of different device categories:

- Windows PCs: PCs running Windows XP, Windows Vista, Windows 7, or Windows 8
- Apple Macintosh: Intel-based Macs running Mac OS X 10.6 or later.
- Smartphones: Android smartphones running Android 4.0 or later.
- Tablets: Android tablets running Android 3.2 or later. The OnLive Android player app was released to the Android Market on December 7, 2011.
- Gaming-centric tablet devices: Wikipad, Nvidia Shield, Nvidia Shield Tablet.
- Android TV: OnLive announced that the OnLive Game Service will be pre-installed on Philips' new line of Android-based smart TVs. OnLive is also compatible with various Android set-top boxes for TVs (MadCatz M.O.J.O.).
- Connected TVs: OnLive announced that the OnLive Game Service will be integrated into new VIZIO VIA Plus TVs along with LG TVs and GoogleTV.
- Internet connected media players: Amazon's Fire TV and Fire TV Stick, VIZIO Co-Star, and VIZIO's line of VIA Blu-ray players.

A web browser based demo service was also available for Windows PCs and Intel-based Macs running Mac OS X 10.5.8 or later enabling trials of games to be played without the need to download the OnLive Client.

Network requirements:

- The service required a 2 Mbit/s Internet connection (5 Mbit/s or higher recommended) with low latency.
- OnLive initially required a wired connection. On September 15, 2010 beta Wi-Fi support was made available to all members.

=== OnLive Game System ===
The OnLive Game System consisted of an OnLive Wireless Controller and a console, called the "MicroConsole TV Adapter", that could be connected to a television and directly to the OnLive service, so it was possible to use the service without a computer. It came with the accessories needed to connect the equipment, and composite video users could purchase an additional optional cable. The MicroConsole supported up to four wireless controllers and multiple Bluetooth headsets. It also had two USB ports for game controllers, keyboards, mice, and USB hubs. For video and audio output it provided component, HDMI, TOSLINK ports, and an analog stereo minijack. An Ethernet port was used for network access, which was required to access the OnLive service. Pre-orders for the OnLive Game System began to be taken on November 17, 2010.

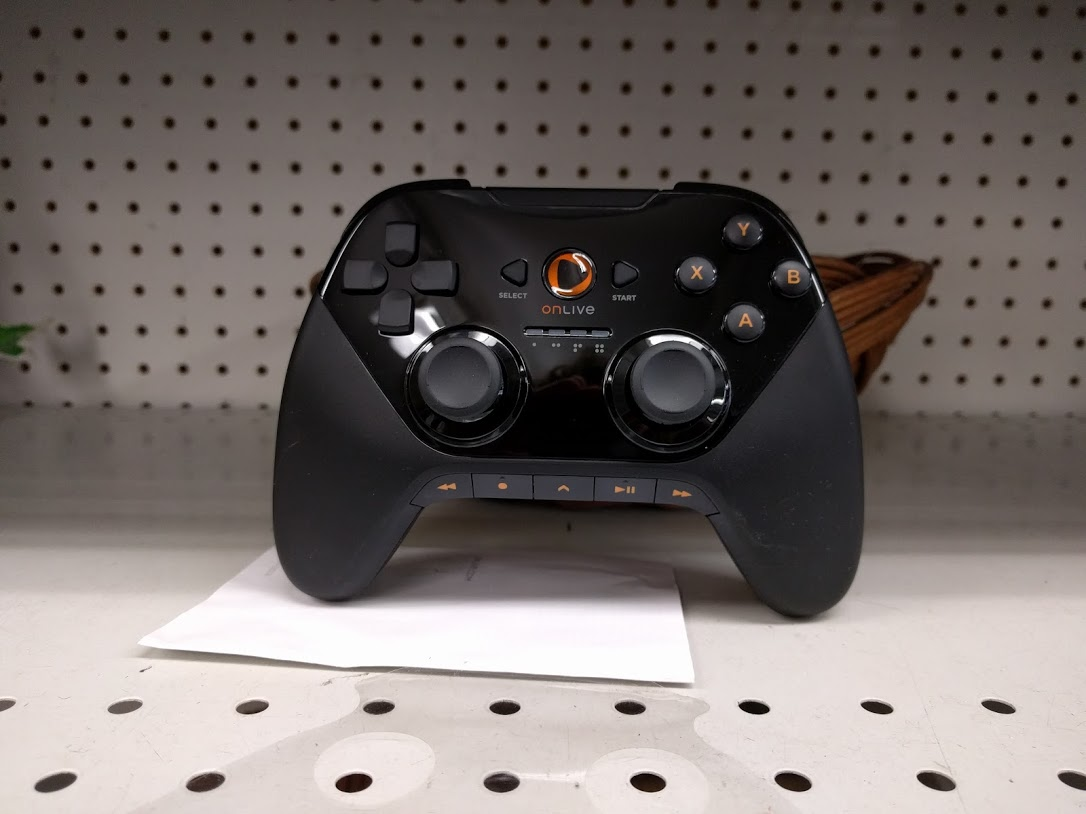

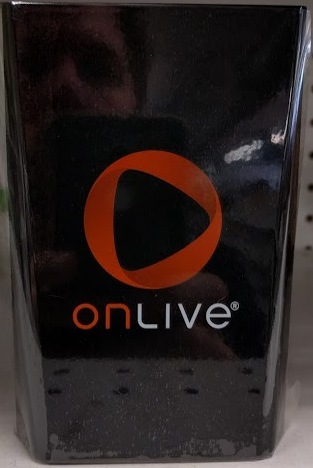

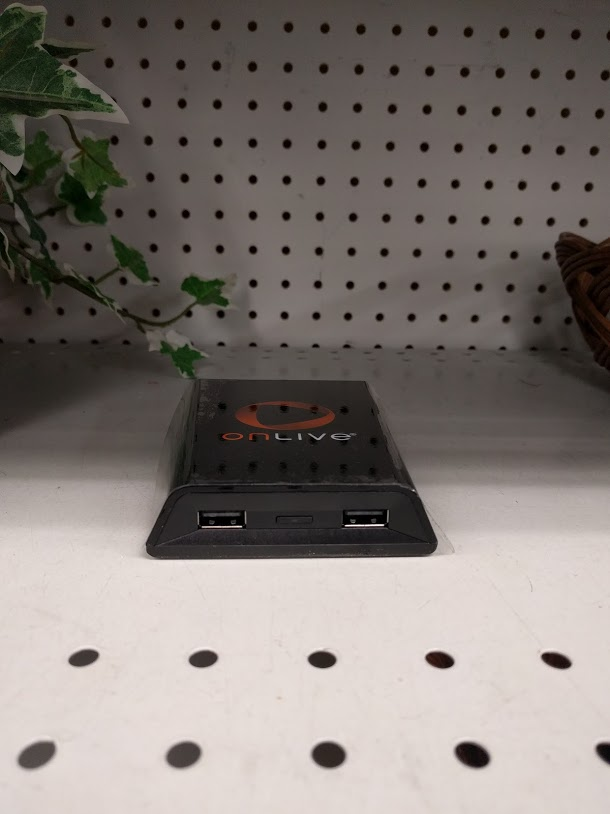

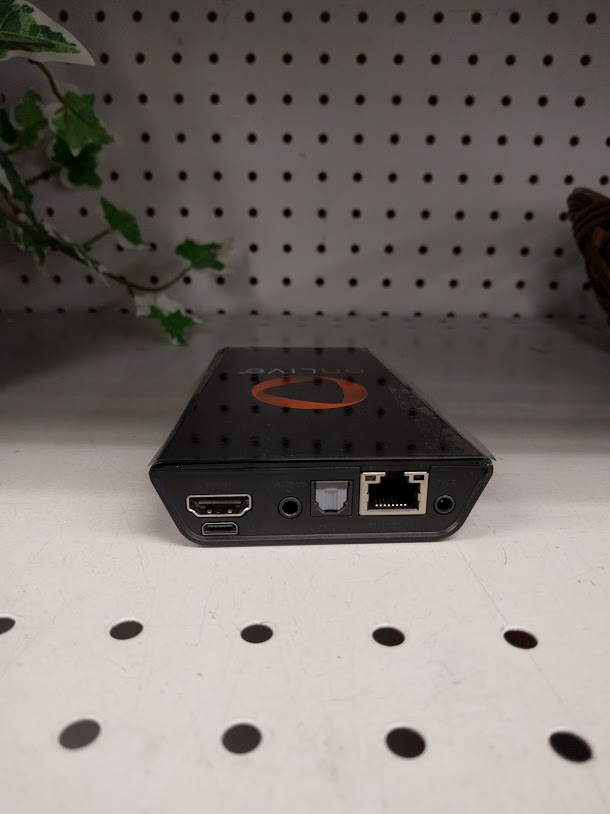

=== PlayPack flat-rate plan ===
OnLive confirmed the details of its PlayPack flat-rate payment plan on December 2, 2010. With this option players pay a monthly fee for unlimited access to "recent, classic and indie titles" in the OnLive library, which includes new releases. PlayPack subscribers also receive a 30% off discount toward purchase of OnLive merchandise excluding PlayPack membership fees. This discount can be applied to sale items, OnLive wireless controllers, and the OnLive Game System.

== Desktop service ==
On January 10, at the 2012 Consumer Electronics Show, OnLive announced "OnLive Desktop". OnLive Desktop used desktop virtualization technology to create a remotely hosted Windows Server 2008 desktop environment.

On March 12, 2012, Microsoft told OnLive that its OnLive Desktop service was a violation of the Windows 7 license agreement, and threatened legal action, contending that the license agreement did not permit the use of Windows 7 as a hosted client, nor for Office to be provided as a service on Windows 7 since this would be only allowed using Windows Server and Terminal Services. On April 7, 2012, it was discovered that the OnLive Desktop Service had changed and had begun to use Windows Server 2008, bringing it into license compliance.

== Architecture ==
In the U.S., OnLive was hosted in five co-located North American data centers. There were facilities in Santa Clara, California and Virginia, with additional facilities in Dallas, Texas, as well as Illinois, and Georgia. OnLive stated that users must be located within 1,000 miles (1,600 km) of one of these to receive high-quality service.

The hardware used was a custom setup consisting of OnLive's proprietary video compression chip as well as standard PC CPU and GPU chips. For older, or lower-performance, games such as Lego Batman, multiple instances could be played on each server using virtualization technology. High-end games such as Assassin's Creed II required one GPU per game. Two video streams are created for each game. One (the live stream) is optimized for game-play and real-world Internet conditions, while the other (the media stream) was a full HD stream that was server-side and used for spectators or for gamers to record videos of their game-play.

== International availability ==
The service was launched in the United Kingdom on September 22, 2011, in partnership with British Telecom as a bundled service with their broadband packages. The company planned to make its service available in the rest of Europe as well.

== History ==
OnLive was announced at the Game Developers Conference in 2009. The service was originally planned for release in the winter of 2009. OnLive's original investors include Warner Bros., Autodesk and Maverick Capital. A later round of financing included AT&T Media Holdings, Inc. and Lauder Partners as well as the original investors. In May 2010, it was announced that British Telecom and Belgacom invested in and partnered with OnLive.

On March 10, 2010, OnLive announced the OnLive Game Service would launch on June 17, 2010, in the US, and the monthly service fee would be US$14.95. At launch the membership option available was through AT&T's Founding Members promotion, which provides the service for free for the first year and US$4.95 per month for the optional following year. On October 4, 2010, OnLive announced that there would no longer be any subscription fees for the service. On March 11, 2010, OnLive CEO Steve Perlman announced the OnLive Game Portal, a free way to access OnLive games for rental and demos, but without the social features of the Game Service. It was stated that it would roll out later in 2010 after the OnLive Game Service launch. The OnLive Game Service was launched in the United States on June 17, 2010. Shortly afterwards, on December 10 Onlive was awarded a patent for cloud gaming The US Patent Office. The service was launched in the United Kingdom on September 22, 2011. On January 10 at the 2012 Consumer Electronics Show, OnLive announced "OnLive Desktop". OnLive Desktop used virtualization technology to create a remotely hosted Windows 7 desktop.

=== Layoffs and buyout ===
On August 17, 2012, the company laid off all of its employees. OnLive entered into a proceeding known as an "Assignment for the Benefit of Creditors", wherein OnLive shareholders lost their stakes in the company. OnLive then sold off its assets and started a new company, also called OnLive. On August 20, 2012, the company officially revealed Lauder Partners as the buyer. On August 27, 2012, founder Steve Perlman stepped down as CEO, Gary Lauder became chairman, and Charlie Jablonski, former VP of Operations, was appointed COO and acting CEO. It was revealed in October of that year that OnLive was sold for only $4.8 million. For a company that analysts once estimated was worth approximately $1.8 billion, there was some surprise at the low figure for which the company was sold. Some analysts speculated that the true value of the patents held by the company was potentially in the hundreds of millions of dollars, but that the firm's poor bargaining position led to the cheap sale.

=== Relaunch ===
In March 2014 the company hired a new CEO, Mark Jung and released a new gaming service, CloudLift. Cloudlift links to selected titles in a player's game library and allows the player resume game-play on another device.

=== Sale to Sony and Shut down ===
On April 3, 2015, OnLive announced it had sold most of its assets to Sony Computer Entertainment and would be shutting down all services on April 30, 2015.

== Reception ==
=== Pre-launch ===
Soon after the company's announcement at GDC 2009, there was skepticism expressed by game journalists. They were concerned about how the OnLive service might work and what the quality of the service might be. Both in terms of the hardware required in OnLive server centers to render and compress the video, as well as the impact of commercial Internet broadband connections on its delivery. During GDC 2009, which was held in San Francisco, the OnLive service was 50 miles (80 km) from its Santa Clara data center. The closed beta had "hundreds of users on the system". Near E3 in 2009, which is approximately 350 miles (560 km) away from their data center, OnLive demonstrated their service performed well with a consumer cable modem and Internet connection. Matt Peckham from PC World stated in his blog that it might be technically difficult to transfer the amount of data that a high definition game would require. He stated he believed OnLive customers would need a broadband line with "guaranteed, non-shared, uninterruptible speed", but "broadband isn't there yet, nor are ISPs willing to offer performance guarantees". He also mentioned his concerns that the mod community would be unable to create and offer mods since all game data will be stored on the OnLive servers, and that games played on OnLive might not be "owned" by the user, and thus if OnLive were to go under, all the user's games would be inaccessible.

Cevat Yerli, the CEO of Crytek, had researched a method for streaming games but concluded that Crytek's approach would not be viable until 2013 "at earliest". Yerli made it clear Crytek was not directly involved with the OnLive service, and Yerli had no personal experience using the service. Rather, Electronic Arts, the publisher of Crytek's Crysis Warhead, had partnered with OnLive and had tested and endorsed the OnLive technology. Yerli stated:

I want to see it myself. I don't want to say it's either 'top or flop'. I hope it works for them because it could improve gamers' lives. The technology of video-based rendering is not actually a very new concept but they do some things that others didn't do before so it will be interesting to see.

Eurogamer's Digital Foundry was amongst the most harshly skeptical in an article published upon OnLive's unveiling and public demonstration entitled, "GDC: Why OnLive Can't Possibly Work" by Digital Foundry's Richard Leadbetter. The article's analysis characterized OnLive as a faked demo that was technically impossible to accomplish over a consumer Internet connection.

=== Post-launch ===
After the launch of the service in the United States, favorable reviews by game journalists stated that the service performed well, and they looked forward to the service improving over time. Hiawatha Bray of The Boston Globe stated, "It felt exactly as if I had installed the software on my local computer." Chris Holt of Macworld, in his review of Assassin's Creed II on OnLive using his Mac, wrote that he looks forward to future higher resolution improvements that are already promised, he "never encountered any frame rate issues", and "the game is on the whole every bit as immersive, rewarding, and free as the console version". Dan Ackerman of CNET wrote that, "OnLive was an overall very impressive experience, and several minds around the CNET offices were officially blown – a difficult task among this jaded bunch."

In examining latency, Eurogamer's Digital Foundry initial test found that in some of their test scenarios, users of OnLive could expect 150ms of latency over a consumer Internet connection; however, they also noted inconsistencies, in that some games had higher latency, and that this would also depend on the quality of the customer's internet connection. Furthermore, they also noted that while acceptable, these values ran contrary to figures suggested by OnLive before release of lag "being under 80ms" and "usually... between 35-40ms". In their later full-feature article on OnLive, Digital Foundry noted that "during intense gameplay, OnLive is hovering right at the boundary of what is acceptable lag and often exceeds it, resulting in a variable, often unsatisfactory experience", but that "the latency level is probably the most pleasant surprise with this system. Let's be clear: it is most definitely not a replacement for the local experience, but if the system can be tightened up and that 150ms becomes the norm, then it's clear there is potential here for the infrastructure to find a home with certain types of game or certain types of player".

In terms of video quality, Digital Foundry noted that video compression meant image quality also varied depending on the title. Games with a lower number of frame-to-frame differences, or games where such changes were less important, such as Assassin's Creed II or Batman: Arkham Asylum fared well, with these games being "strongly suited to video compression" and "cut-scenes in particular can look very good". However, games that had a greater amount of motion or relied on fast reactions, such as Colin McRae: Dirt, Dirt 3 or Unreal Tournament 3 fared less well, with questions about the playability of the latter when video compression artifacts were taken into account. Digital Foundry felt that the quality of rendering was mostly good, with high frame rates, but with less consistency than console counterparts and with screen-tearing in some scenarios.

Gaming Examiner judged that the graphics were like "playing a PlayStation 3 on a 480p standard [definition] TV", that they thought that they experienced much lower framerates than expected, and that the controller was not working reliably.

After the launch in United Kingdom, Computer and Video Games remarked that, after one month of use, the service was "working" and was adequate for trying or renting a game, but that it was not a substitute for owning a game on another platform due to the limitations imposed by internet connections (lag, freezing and smeary visuals, as well as high data usage for those on capped connections).
