= Ravi Sawhney =

American industrial designer

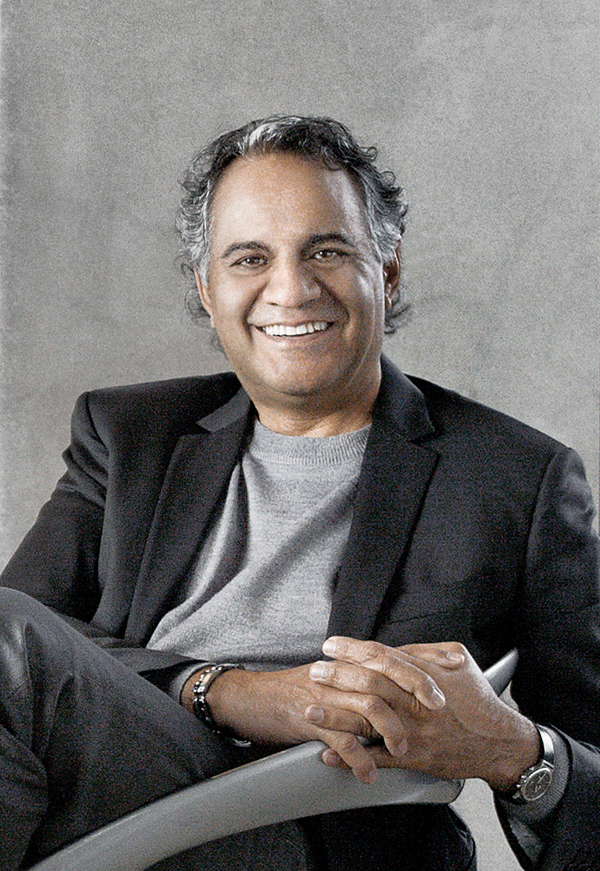
- Sawhney in 2024
- Education: California State University, Northridge (BA); Academy of Art University (PhD)
- Occupations: Designer, Businessman, Educator, Author
- Known for: Founder and CEO of RKS Design Creator of Psycho-Aesthetics Co-founder, investor, and board member/advisor in more than two dozen companies including; LoanGifting, GameVice, D&A Guitar Gear, RKS Guitars, FloWater, FreshRealm and KOR Water

Ravi Kumar Sawhney is an American industrial designer. He is the founder and CEO of RKS Design, co-founder (with Dave Mason) of RKS Guitars, and Chairperson of the IDSA/Business Week Catalyst Case Study Program.He was named a Fellow of the Industrial Designers Society of America in 2009.

== Career ==
In 1978, Sawhney graduated from California State University, Northridge with both a Bachelor of Arts in product design and a Bachelor of Arts in industrial design. He then attended the ArtCenter College of Design in Pasadena. Upon graduating, Sawhney joined Xerox's Advanced Development Group at Xerox Parc.

RKS Design Logo

In 1980, Ravi Sawhney went on to found RKS Design, a design firm and consultancy. Since the founding of RKS, Ravi Sawhney has been named on over 500 patents and has won over 200 design awards globally including numerous IDEA, Core77, NDA, Edison, and Spark awards. Sawhney has also been named as a Fellow by IDSA in 2009, and as a Distinguished Alumni by CSUN in 2013.

RKS Design developed the production design of the animated Teddy Ruxpin, one of the best-selling toys in the history of the toy industry, with sales reaching $93 million in one year. RKS also designed the MiniMed 507 insulin pump for diabetes treatment in the late 1990s. By mimicking a high-end pager, the 507 destigmatized insulin pump use and fueled widespread adoption, achieving sales of $171 million by 1998 and capturing 80% of the market by 2005. This success culminated in Medtronic's acquisition of MiniMed for over $3.6 billion.

To address the growing issue of student loan debt, Ravi Sawhney and RKS Design developed LoanGifting, a platform that reimagines traditional gift-giving by allowing friends and family to contribute directly to student loan repayment, which evolved into a B2B solution, Finnita, recognizing the potential for employers to utilize student loan repayment as a powerful recruitment and retention tool. Sawhney and RKS Design earned a Silver Edison Award for the incubation of LoanGifting in 2016. Sawhney also developed Psycho-Aesthetics, a design methodology that uses consumer psychology and mapping to examine users’ needs, aspirations, and emotional responses to products.

RKS Guitars was a musical instrument design and manufacturing company founded in the early 2000s by Ravi Sawhney, Dave Mason, and the team at RKS Design. Sawhney sought to reinvent the electric guitar at RKS Guitars. The innovative designs of RKS Guitars received two Silver Industrial Designers Society of America (IDEA) awards. RKS Guitars eventually ceased production in 2012. RKS guitars have been played by leading artists including Mick Jagger, Keith Richards, Rick Springfield, Don Felder, and Beck.
