= Remote Play =

Sony PlayStation remote control feature

- Developer: Sony Interactive Entertainment
- Release: 2006; 20 years ago
- Operating system: PSP, PS Vita, PlayStation 3, PlayStation 4, PlayStation 5, Android, Windows, macOS, iOS
- Type: Entertainment
- Licence: Freeware
- Website: Official website

Remote Play is a native functionality of video game consoles by Sony that allows the PlayStation 3, PlayStation 4 and PlayStation 5 to wirelessly transmit video and audio output to a receiving device, which would also control the console. Remote Play works either nearby, when both the console and the receiver are on the same home local area network, or remotely via the Internet through Sony's servers.

Originally built for connectivity with PlayStation Portable, support was later expanded to other Sony devices including PlayStation Vita, PlayStation TV, Xperia-branded smartphones and tablets, and PlayStation Now. In 2016, it was expanded to Microsoft Windows PCs and macOS, and in 2019 to all Android and iOS devices. Remote Play is a mandatory feature on all PS4 and PS5 games, except for games that utilize peripherals such as PlayStation Move.

== Concept ==
Sony defined Remote Play as follows:

"Remote Play allows a PSP system to connect wirelessly to a PS3 system and transfers some functionality of the PS3 to the PSP system. With remote play, a PSP system may access files that are located on the PS3, as well as, play certain software titles ..."

Sony later amended this definition to apply between the PlayStation 4 and PlayStation Vita as well. The premise of Off-TV Play on the Wii U is similar in concept, in how the video game console does all of the processing, but sends the image and sound straight to the Wii U GamePad's screen instead of a television screen. Similarly, in the case of Remote Play, the PlayStation 3 or PlayStation 4 do all of the processing, but transmit the image and sound to the PlayStation Portable or PlayStation Vita screens and speakers. While typically in reference to Sony consoles and handhelds, it has been used in different ways as well. In April 2010, a firmware update was released for the PS3 that allowed Remote Play between it and the Sony VAIO brand desktops and laptops and Sony Xperia brand smartphones and tablets as well. Remote Play is not limited to a nearby connection; it may be used "outside your home" using the Internet when both devices are paired and connected to the Internet.

== Background ==
=== PS3 to PSP ===
Interactivity between Sony's home video game consoles and handheld video game console is traced back as far as 2006, prior to the PlayStation 3's launch, when journalists noticed a PlayStation Portable icon, with the title "Remote Play", on pre-release versions of their PS3. The functionality was officially revealed just prior to the PS3's launch in October 2006, at Sony's "Gamer's Day" event, where Sony demonstrated the ability to transfer the PS3's output to a PSP instead of a television, through showing downloaded PlayStation games and movie films being transmitted to a PSP's screen and speakers. Sony announced that all original PlayStation games would support the feature, but they had to be digital, not disc-based, media from the PS3's internal harddrive. This later changed by the end of 2007, when a firmware update made it so any original PlayStation game was compatible with Remote Play, even disc-based ones.

Despite Sony's early emphasis on Remote Play and original PlayStation game support, it was used very sparingly between the PS3 and PSP, with very few PS3 titles allowing for its use. The feature was even removed from several titles before their final release, most notably Gran Turismo HD and Formula One Championship Edition. Most titles were small PlayStation Network-only titles. The 2007 PS3 title Lair was notable for being one of the few original, physical Blu-ray disc releases to work between the PS3 and PSP.

=== PS3 to PS Vita ===
In late 2011, just prior to the launch of the PlayStation Vita, video game website Eurogamer published a rumor stating that a firmware update for the PS3 would provide Remote Play compatibility for all PS3 games when using Remote Play between a PS3 and Vita. The premise seemed plausible, with websites reporting that Sony had shown working demonstrations of the concept prior to the rumor at the Tokyo Game Show, showing LittleBigPlanet 2 and Killzone 3 supporting the feature. Despite this, the rumor was declared false by Sony, who said that the feature had to be implemented on the software side by developers on an individual basis, not on a hardware level.

PS3 to Vita Remote Play went on to be rarely implemented as well. It retained any games supported by PS3 to PSP Remote Play support, including all original PlayStation games, but was again rarely used by actual PS3 games. Only a few games supported it, namely HD Remasters such as The Ico & Shadow of the Colossus Collection and the God of War Collection.

President of Sony's Worldwide Studios for Sony Interactive Entertainment Inc. Shuhei Yoshida summarized the issues with PS3 to Vita Remote Play:

"The single biggest issue, why there are not many PlayStation 3 games that support Remote Play, was that it was optional – the system didn't do much. The game has to set aside some memory or CPU to be able to do that, and usually, memory is the most precious resource that [development] teams fight amongst each other for. So when it comes down to the priorities, these are features that are very easy to drop."

Despite this, unofficial hacks to the PS3 firmware have been reported to unlock the Remote Play feature in a number of PS3 games with varying degrees of success. Games such as Battlefield 3 and BioShock Infinite have been shown to technically be feasible, though still impossible to do without unofficially hacking the PS3's firmware.

=== PS4 to PS Vita ===
In June 2013, Sony announced that all PlayStation 4 games would be compatible with Remote Play with the PS Vita, with the exception of games which conceptually would not work, such as ones that heavily revolve around PlayStation Camera use. Otherwise, contrary to PS3 to PS Vita Remote Play, PS4 to PS Vita Remote Play is designed on a hardware level, meaning that all games are automatically compatible, and it is only up to developers to make sure the controls adapt well to being played on a Vita instead of a DualShock 4. This iteration of Remote Play was developed by Gaikai, who also developed PlayStation Now. Remote Play on the updated PlayStation Vita 2000 was shown at Tokyo Game Show in 2013.

=== PlayStation Portal ===
In November 2023, Sony released the PlayStation Portal, a handheld gaming accessory for the PlayStation 5. The PlayStation Portal includes an 8-inch LCD HD screen and "all of the buttons and features of a DualSense controller".

=== Other uses ===
PS4 firmware update 1.70 introduced full remote play functionality for the PlayStation TV, allowing users to play PS4 games in a separate room or house, on a television set with a PS TV device remotely connected to the PS4.

Remote Play with the PS4 is available for Android smartphones and tablet computers running Android 5.0 Lollipop or later, and requires a DualShock 4 in order to play games. The service was made available on 28 October 2014, exclusively on Sony's Xperia Z3 series phones, and was expanded to Sony's older Z2 series a month later. In October 2019, support was expanded to all Android smartphones with the release of PS4 system software 7.00.

With the release of PS4 system software 3.50 on 6 April 2016, Remote Play was made available on Windows PCs and macOS. A DualShock 4 controller is required to use it, and must be connected through a USB cable or wirelessly via a separate accessory. 1080p streaming is available when using a PS4 Pro model.

Cloud gaming and Remote Play are some of several Gaikai-powered streaming services announced for the PlayStation 4 through its PlayStation Now service. Cloud gaming differs from Remote Play in that Remote Play allows games on home devices to operate remotely over a wireless network, while cloud gaming refers to a game that resides on a distant server rather than on a user's device.

Support for PlayStation 5 games was added to the app in early November 2020, just before the console's launch on November 12, 2020.

== Software compatibility ==
In 2007, Sony made all original PlayStation games, when played on a PlayStation 3, compatible with Remote Play on the PSP. Additionally, Sony announced that all PlayStation 4 games will be playable on the PlayStation Vita. Beyond these two scenarios, Remote Play was a feature that was sparingly implemented in games. The chart below indicates instances when Remote Play on PS3 is an available feature.

| Game | PSP compatible | PS Vita compatible |
|---|---|---|
| Aqua Vita/Aquatopia | Yes | Yes |
| Anarchy: Rush Hour | Yes | Yes |
| Bejeweled 2 | Yes | Yes |
| Bionic Commando Rearmed | Yes | Yes |
| BlazBlue: Calamity Trigger | Yes | Yes |
| Chaos;Child | No | Yes |
| Chariot | No | Yes |
| FirstPlay | Yes | Yes |
| God of War Collection | No | Yes |
| Gundemonium Recollection | Yes | Yes |
| High Stakes on the Vegas Strip: Poker Edition | Yes | Yes |
| Ico & Shadow of the Colossus Collection | No | Yes |
| The Idolmaster: Gravure For You! Vol. 9 | Yes | Yes |
| Imabikisō | Yes | Yes |
| Lair | Yes | Yes |
| LEGO Batman | Yes | Yes |
| Life with PlayStation | Yes | Yes |
| Mainichi Issho | Yes | Yes |
| Misato Katsuragi's Reporting Plan | Yes | Yes |
| Peggle | Yes | Yes |
| Peggle Nights | Yes | Yes |
| PixelJunk Eden | Yes | Yes |
| PixelJunk Monsters | Yes | Yes |
| PixelJunk Shooter | Yes | Yes |
| PlayTV | Yes | Yes |
| Robotics;Notes | No | Yes |
| Retro/Grade | Yes | Yes |
| SingStar | Yes | Yes |
| SingStar Vol. 2 | Yes | Yes |
| SingStar ABBA | Yes | Yes |
| SingStar Viewer | Yes | Yes |
| Tokyo Jungle | No | Yes |
| VidZone | Yes | Yes |
| Weekly Toro Station | Yes | Yes |
| Zuma | Yes | Yes |

== See also ==
- PlayStation Now
- Off-TV Play
- Xbox SmartGlass
- Steam Link
