= Dark Chronicle =

2002 video game

- European cover art featuring the two main characters, Monica and Max
- Developer: Level-5
- Publisher: Sony Computer Entertainment
- Director: Akihiro Hino
- Producers: Akihiro Hino; Kabayashi Yasuhide
- Designers: Akihiro Hino; Yasuhiro Akasaka; Yoshiaki Kusuda
- Programmer: Kenji Matsusue
- Artists: Takeshi Majima; Jun Sonobe
- Writer: Akihiro Hino
- Composer: Tomohito Nishiura
- Platform: PlayStation 2
- Release: JP: November 28, 2002; NA: February 17, 2003; EU: September 12, 2003
- Genre: Action role-playing
- Mode: Single-player

Dark Chronicle, released as Dark Cloud 2 in North America, is a 2002 action role-playing game developed by Level-5 and published by Sony Computer Entertainment for the PlayStation 2 (PS2). It was released in Japan before releasing in English in 2003. An emulated version of the game was released for the PlayStation 4 through the PlayStation Network in 2016.

The game is a successor to 2000's Dark Cloud, with which it shares the same basic game mechanics but features new characters and plot. Players control two main protagonists, Max and Monica, who must work together to stop the game's main antagonist, Emperor Griffon, from destroying the world. The game features themes of time traveling, with Max and Monica trying to prevent Griffon's destruction by altering the past to change the future.

The game was met with positive reviews from critics, who praised the improvements over Dark Cloud, in particular the graphics and variety of gameplay styles. Dark Chronicle won several awards, and sold roughly 250,000 copies in Japan within a month.

== Gameplay ==
Combat in Dark Chronicle. Monica lifts up a rock to throw at an approaching enemy.

Dark Chronicle is an action role-playing game played from a third-person perspective. The player moves through procedurally-generated dungeons, battles monsters and collects items. Throughout most of the game, players control characters Max and Monica. Max fights with a wrench as his melee weapon and a gun as his ranged weapon. Monica uses a sword and a magical bracelet. Combat in the game uses real time hack and slash techniques. Each character also has a unique combat ability: Max can pilot a customizable, mech-like vehicle called the Ridepod, and Monica can shapeshift into monsters.

Unlike most action role-playing games in which the characters level-up, weapons in Dark Chronicle instead do the leveling. Once a certain number of experience points (called "absorption points") have been gained, the weapon is automatically leveled up. As weapons level up, their number of "Synthesis Points" increases, determining how many "spectrumized" items can be attached to it. Most items in this game can be broken down, or "spectrumized", which turns the item into a "SynthSphere" that can be attached to a weapon to raise specific stats, depending on its properties. Attachments cost synthesis points; when the weapon's points are depleted, no more attachments can be made until the weapon is leveled up and more synthesis points are attained. Weapons can also be spectrumized but the resulting SynthSphere will be unstable unless the weapon is level five or higher.

Weapons can be evolved into a more powerful form if certain requirements are met; some also require the player to have defeated particular types of enemies.

As in Dark Cloud, weapons wear out over time and must be repaired to avoid breakage. In contrast with Dark Cloud, broken weapons do not disappear from the players' inventories but become unusable until repaired and lose some of the experience they have accrued. As in the previous game, characters can only grow stronger by consuming particular items that permanently increase their health points and defense.

Georama mode in Dark Chronicle. Here, the player places a house on a previously placed hill in Sindain to affect events in the game's future world.

A major component of Dark Chronicle's gameplay involves special items called "Geostones" which are used to rebuild the world outside the dungeons. When removed from the dungeon, Geostones can be placed into the database of a machine called the "Carpenterion", which turns them into plans for building objects, including houses, trees, lights and rivers, which the player may build once the plans are available and the player has the necessary materials. At this point, the player can enter "Georama mode"—a gameplay mode similar to city-building games—and arrange the pieces on the landscape. Buildings can then be populated with villagers recruited from other levels throughout the game. Certain conditions must be met for each village; when each condition is completed, something significant in the future changes. Each Georama map must complete as many of the conditions for that map as possible; it is not necessary to achieve 100% to advance the plot in any map, but doing so earns the player bonus items.

The player can recruit non-player characters (NPCs) onto their teams at various points in the game by performing specific tasks. These characters are never controllable and do not appear in battle, but players can access a party member's special ability through the "Characters" portion of the menu. Each character has a different ability and only one can be active at a time. Some characters can influence a battle, such as increasing item drops and adjusting enemy behavior; others can produce certain items inside or outside dungeons.

Fishing is another feature of the game; players can catch fish to breed and train in their fish tanks. Later in the game, players' fish can be entered into weigh-in competitions and races. The game also has an invention system with which players take photographs of various items and combine them to generate ideas for inventions, which can be created if players have the required materials. A golf minigame called "spheda" is playable on every completed floor.

== Plot ==
A princess runs to her father's room in a castle in a panic. She arrives to find a man standing over her dead father's body. The man disappears in a ball of light.

Elsewhere, a boy named Max from the town of Palm Brinks attends a circus. By coincidence, he overhears a conversation where ringmaster Flotsam pressures the town mayor Need to find a special stone located in the town. Max makes a loud noise and unintentionally gets Flotsam's attention - who notices Max is wearing the special stone as a pendant. Max escapes, and embarks on an adventure by leaving the town via the sewers.

After leaving the town, Max is told that 15 years ago Emperor Griffon destroyed the world but spared Palm Brinks because he wanted a special stone - Max's pendant - and that Flotsam is one of Griffon's henchman. Flotsam again finds Max but is interrupted and defeated by the princess, who we learn is called Monica. Monica lives in the time 100 years after Max's present. Like Max, she has a special stone. Their two stones - called atlamillia - allow them to travel between Max's time and Monica's time.

Max and Monica use their new ability to time travel, as well as the reopening of the railroad by Mayor Need to go on a mission rebuilding areas of the world that Griffon destroyed. In doing so, they fix the future - Monica's time - allowing them to get the help from the future they need to beat Griffon.

During these adventures, they learn that Emperor Griffon possesses a gold atlamillia - the most powerful of the three - but desires the other two to make him all powerful. Upon the completion of Paznos, a flying fortress capable of transforming into a mech, Max and Monica use it to help defeat Griffon's army in Monica's time. During the battle, Max and Monica receive word that Ixion, a time-traveling train, has also been completed at Luna Lab.

Max and Monica use Ixion to head 10,000 years into the past to face Emperor Griffon, a young moon-person who lives in Moon Flower Palace. He tricks them into thinking they had defeated him, stealing their atlamillia and revealing his real form. Griffon plans to summon the Star of Oblivion, which will destroy all life on Earth and allow a new, better world to grow in its place. He starts by moving his palace into the sky of Max's time to destroy the world.

Max and Monica return to Max's time with Ixion, and travel to Kazarov Stonehenge - a place that can act as a time portal - allowing them to bring Paznos to Max's time. They activate it, and Paznos arrives in Max's time and sends the Moon Flower Palace crashing to the ground.

Once again, Max and Monica face Griffon at the Palace. They instead meet a woman named Alexandra, who tells them she owns the Palace and that Griffon was once an orphan child called Sirus, whom Alexandra adopted. Sirus has forgotten his childhood because of the evil inside him. Alexandra asks them to restore the palace's garden to remind Sirus of his old life.

They do so and confront Griffon. These old memories weaken Griffon and Max and Monica manage to defeat him - turning him back into Sirus, who is mortally wounded. A Dark Element rises from Sirus' body and calls the Star of Oblivion. The Element reveals it was born from Sirus' hatred of humans and plans to rule over the destroyed Earth. Max, Monica and Sirus defeat the Element. Sirus stops the Star of Oblivion, dying in the process.

== Development ==
Cutscene showcasing the cel shading on Max along with Level-5's "tonal rendering", which applies smooth shaded foreground characters on detailed backgrounds.

Rumors about Dark Chronicle first appeared in April 2002, when Level-5 Inc. updated its website with an image of a silhouette from its newest game, although no other details were made available at the time. The game was officially announced on May 16, when Level-5 launched a full website that revealed the new game would include Dark Cloud's Georama mode and had more features than its predecessor. The site also demonstrated the cel-shaded graphics and featured pictures of the two protagonists.

You can fill your world with anything you want to invent. But there are things that we can not create - the unquestionable truths of today, and of course our own memories and even history itself.

— promotional blurb for Dark Chronicle

More information was revealed at E3 later in May, when Sony Computer Entertainment announced the game would be released in Japan and Europe as Dark Chronicle and in North America as Dark Cloud 2, with a release date of late 2002 to early 2003. The invention system, which according to Sony would feature over 100 hours of gameplay, was also demonstrated for the first time. IGN and GameSpot both featured previews of the game based on the E3 demo; IGN focused on the improved Georama system and praised the cel-shaded graphics, and GameSpot looked at the dungeons, finding the combat improved from the first game.

The visual style of Dark Chronicle departs from that of Dark Cloud by using cel shading. Level-5 referred to the graphic style as "tonal rendering"; the main characters have a smooth, shaded look and the backgrounds have detailed textures and lighting. The main characters have a higher polygon count than the supporting characters and are composed of 2,500 to 3,000 polygons. Supporting characters are composed of 1,500 to 2,000 polygons. The game's graphics were created with Softimage 3D. Cutscenes use the models that are used in normal gameplay, both of which are generated in real-time, thus costume changes are carried over from gameplay to cutscenes. Akihiro Hino, the game's writer, director, designer and producer, said that "smooth transitions between gameplay and event scenes help increase the empathy for the game". Soft textures were used to create a uniform feel for the visuals and to minimize the computer-generated appearance of the cel shading. Texture mapping was used occasionally to emulate lighting. The game's production took almost two years; the CG production and game development occurred simultaneously.

An emulated version of the game for the PlayStation 4 through the PlayStation Network was released in January 2016. It features 1080p resolution, trophy support, Remote Play, and Share Play compatibility.

=== Music ===
The game's music was composed and produced by Tomohito Nishiura. A two-disc album, Dark Chronicle Original Sound Tracks, was released in Japan by Scitron on February 19, 2003. GameSpot's Brad Shoemaker wrote that "Dark Cloud 2's music ranges from good to excellent", and said that "generally there are enough tunes that you won't get too bored of hearing any particular one". IGN's Kaiser Hwang wrote that "the music in Dark Cloud 2 ranges from really good, to really really good, to exceptionally good". A remix album, Dark Chronicle Premium Arrange, was published in Japan by Team Entertainment on April 21, 2004. It consists of 12 arranged tracks from the game by Yasunori Mitsuda, Shinji Hosoe, Motoi Sakuraba, Yoko Shimomura, Noriyuki Iwadare, Kenji Ito and The Black Mages.

=== Sequel ===
A sequel, potentially titled Dark Cloud 3, was first rumored to be in development for PlayStation 3 in an alleged leak published in 2006 by PSMania, which said Level-5 was aiming for a March 2009 release. In 2009, Level-5 manager Yoshiaki Kusuda said that although the company did not have a "specific plan for a sequel", it would "seriously consider making it" if fans asked for it often enough, leading Kotaku writer Stephen Totilo to encourage readers to request the game. Totilo reported in 2010 and again in 2012 that several people had misread the original 2009 interview, were emailing him and asking him to make it. Reporting on a 2017 interview that Hino gave to Nikkei Business Publications, Rolling Stone lamented that a Dark Cloud 3 was not among Level-5's plans for the Nintendo Switch. Hino told Polygon that Level-5 could not produce a new Dark Cloud game on its own because the license was co-owned by Sony.

== Reception ==
Reception

Aggregate score
Aggregator	Score
Metacritic	87/100

Review scores
Publication	Score
Eurogamer	9/10
Famitsu	35/40
GameRevolution	B
GameSpot	9/10
GameSpy	4/5
GameZone	8.4/10
IGN	9/10
Official U.S. PlayStation Magazine	5/5

Award
Publication	Award
GameSpot	Best PlayStation 2 Game (2003)

Dark Chronicle received generally favorable reviews, with an aggregate score of 87 out of 100 on Metacritic, based on forty-one reviews. GameSpot's Brad Shoemaker scored the game 9 out of 10, calling it "one of the finest games released for the PlayStation 2 so far" and "an aesthetic masterpiece". He praised the variety of the gameplay, writing that "there's so much to do that it's almost overwhelming" and concluded that "Dark Cloud 2 is simply a class act all the way. Every element of the game, from the georama system to the weapon upgrading to the interaction with a large cast of characters, displays a polish and attention to quality that you find only in real classics". The publication named Dark Chronicle the best PlayStation 2 game of February 2003.

IGN's Kaiser Hwang also scored the game 9 out of 10, calling it "arguably the best looking PS2 game out there". He concluded that "Dark Cloud 2 takes the standard sequel road and gives us everything that made the original Dark Cloud great, only bigger and better... The leap in quality between the two games really is amazing. From the incredible graphics, to the great sound, to the refined gameplay, Dark Cloud 2 just oozes of quality and polish". Eurogamer's Ronan Jennings also scored the game 9 out of 10, writing "it deserves credit for making us focus on actually doing things. Its qualities aren't designed to bring quick gasps from casual gamers—they are designed to keep people like you playing for hours on end. Add great graphics, decent music and quality voice acting to the mix and there's not much to say against it". GameSpy's Christian Nutt scored the game 4 out of 5, saying it fell just short of being a classic: "The biggest and most obvious problem with the game has to be its story. There was not a single, solitary moment during the game where I was even the slightest bit interested in or entertained by its copious, well-voiced, cinematic sequences. His conclusion was: There's no question in my mind that Dark Cloud 2 is one of the most solid RPG adventures for the PS2; but... it doesn't quite live up to its potential. If Level-5 had worked out all of the kinks, it'd be one of my favorite games for the PS2. Sadly, it's not. While it has my grudging respect, there are many games that I prefer, thanks to DC2's idiosyncrasies".

Game Revolution's Johnny Liu awarded the game a B, praising the graphics and variety of gameplay but said it became somewhat repetitive towards the end: "Dark Cloud 2 is very serial in nature. It's a game you can pick up and play for a few hours, stomping though a few dungeon floors, trying to solve a problem or two, but after a while it meanders towards repetition. In truth, the game is filled with innumerable challenges, likable characters and a high production value. But beneath the surface, the lightweight story and characters combined with the almost rigidly episodic game flow still hold it back".

=== Sales and awards ===
Dark Chronicle sold 235,917 copies in Japan by the end of 2002.

The game won "Best PlayStation 2 Game" (2003) from GameSpot and nominated for "Console Role-Playing Game of the Year" (2004) from the Academy of Interactive Arts & Sciences. It was also nominated for "Best Adventure Game" at the 1st British Academy Games Awards, losing to The Legend of Zelda: The Wind Waker. It received a "Silver Award" from Electronic Gaming Monthly and a "Bronze Award" from PSM. Dark Chronicle was named "Game of the Month" for February 2003 and given an "Editor's Choice" award by IGN, which in 2010 placed it at #31 in their "Top 100 PlayStation 2 Games".
