= Dark Cloud =

2000 video game

- Developer: Level-5 (Note: Additional work by Sony Computer Entertainment Japan.)
- Publisher: Sony Computer Entertainment
- Producer: Akihiro Hino
- Designer: Akihiro Hino
- Programmer: Kenji Matsusue
- Artist: Takeshi Majima
- Writer: Akihiro Hino
- Composer: Tomohito Nishiura
- Platform: PlayStation 2
- Release: JP: December 14, 2000; NA: May 29, 2001; EU: September 21, 2001
- Genre: Action role-playing
- Mode: Single-player

Dark Cloud is an 2000 action role-playing game developed by Level-5 and published by Sony Computer Entertainment for the PlayStation 2. Originally intended as a launch title for the system, the game was eventually released in Japan in December 2000, in North America in May 2001, and in Europe in September 2001. A second installment, Dark Chronicle (Dark Cloud 2 in North America), was released in Japan in 2002 and worldwide the following year.

Combining the mechanisms of action role-playing games with elements of city-building games, Dark Cloud tells the story of a group of adventurers who band together to fight against the Dark Genie, who has attacked and destroyed many villages. The main protagonist and player character is Toan, a boy who is given a magical stone called the Atlamillia by the fairy king Simba, granting him the power to rebuild the destroyed lands.

Dark Cloud was met with mainly positive reviews by critics, who praised its blend of gameplay types, although some criticized its repetitive combat. The game sold over a million copies worldwide by 2014. It was later released via emulation for the PlayStation 4 through the PlayStation Network in December 2015.

== Gameplay ==
In-game screenshot, showing Toan fighting a dragon in one of the game's dungeons

Dark Cloud is an action role-playing game played from a third-person perspective, in which the player moves through procedurally-generated dungeons, battling monsters and collecting items. On random dungeon levels, the player may have the option of entering a separate "back door" area which contains stronger monsters and rarer treasure. Although the majority of combat involves real time hack and slash, the player will occasionally "Duel" an enemy. In this type of battle, the player must correctly press a sequence of buttons, similar to a quick time event. While in dungeons, the player has both a health meter and a thirst meter. The thirst meter gradually decreases over time, and when fully depleted, it causes the health meter to begin to decrease. To prevent the thirst meter from depleting, the player must drink water or step into one of the pools found in many dungeon levels.

A major component of Dark Cloud's gameplay involves special items called "Atla" which are used to rebuild the world outside the dungeons. Atla, which are present in most dungeon levels, are large spherical objects which can be retrieved by Toan only. When Atla are removed from the dungeon, they transform into pieces of the world (trees, houses, villagers, etc.). These pieces must then be reassembled in "Georama mode"; a gameplay mode similar to city-building games, in which the player can arrange the pieces onto the landscape. After villagers have been placed, the player can speak to them to discover their wishes for rebuilding the village, regarding both what they need for their own house to be rebuilt completely, and where they wish their house to be placed. The player's progress in terms of collecting Atla, rebuilding the village and fulfilling the villagers' wishes are recorded as percentages. When all three reach 100%, the village is complete, although it is not necessary for the player to reach 100% in all three to be able to move on to the next set of dungeons and the next village; the player must only acquire 100% in collection and rebuilding to unlock the next village. Completing 100% of the villagers' wishes is not a requirement, although if the player does reach 100%, they are awarded a bonus item/ability.

Unlike most action role-playing games, instead of the characters leveling up, their weapons do. Weapons attain "absorption points" with each kill. Once a certain number of points has been reached, the weapon can be leveled up. However, weapons wear out over time, and it is necessary to repair them in order to prevent them from breaking. With the exception of each characters' starting weapon, a broken weapon is immediately removed from the player's inventory and cannot be retrieved or repaired. To upgrade a weapon, the player can attach stat-increasing items (attack power, speed, ability to kill different types of monsters, elemental attributes, etc.), but a single weapon can only carry a limited number of attachments. These attachments are absorbed into the weapon when it is leveled up, freeing up space for more attachments. When a weapon reaches level five, it can be transformed into a "SynthSphere", which carries 60% of the weapon's power and attributes. This sphere can then be attached to another weapon, and absorbed into it when it levels up, just like a regular attachment. The characters themselves can only grow stronger with the consumption of particular items, which can increase their health points, water meter and defense.

Dark Cloud features six main character: three melee fighters and three ranged fighters, each using a different weapon. Each character also has an individual ability that allow them to move through the dungeons. For example, Xiao can jump across chasms that other characters can not.

== Plot ==
A long, long time ago, when the two moons were shining, there were two continents in the world, living separately but peacefully. In the East there was an advanced civilization; the development of technology had brought prosperity and wealth there. In the West the people lived in harmony with the natural world, co-existing peacefully with the spirits and animals around them. Then came the time of darkness. A great evil was unleashed, and a Dark Cloud overshadowed the Western continent. Whole villages were destroyed. Entire families mysteriously vanished. And a strange and magical adventure began.

The game begins as Colonel Flag Gilgister of the Lagoon Empire Army of the East attempts to awaken the Dark Genie, a legendary evil creature whom Flag wishes to use to control the world. Upon summoning the Genie, Flag orders him to attack the West. Prior to the attack, Simba, the Fairy King, casts a protective spell around the land, sealing the buildings, objects and people inside magical orbs called "Atla". Due to the power of the Genie's attack, the orbs are scattered.

Meanwhile, Toan, whose home village of Norune has been destroyed, although he survived the attack unhurt, encounters the Fairy King, who gives him a magical stone called the "Atlamillia", and tasks him with finding the scattered Atla and transforming back into its original form. Toan sets about restoring Norune, and in a nearby cave meets a man named Seda, who defeats him in a duel when Toan attempts to protect a nearby cat. As a reward for his kindness, Seda gives Toan a "changing potion", which he uses to transform the cat into a "catgirl" named Xiao, who joins him on his quest. Toan and Xiao soon find Dran, guardian of Norune, who is possessed by the Genie, and who attacks them. They defeat him, releasing him from the Genie's control, and he tells them of the legend of the "Black Demon" that nearly destroyed the world, until it was defeated and imprisoned by the Moon People. He suggests they seek out the Moon People, telling them to visit a sentient tree called Treant in nearby Matataki Village.

In Matataki, Toan and Xiao are joined by a local boy named Goro, and the trio set about rebuilding the village. Treant tells them how to get to the Moon People, and they make their way to Brownboo, a village unaffected by the Genie's attack, and home of the Moon People. Toan asks them if they can seal the Genie again, but they explain they have forgotten how to use magic. The Moon People who live on the Moon can still use magic, and so they decide to head there, using the Moon Ship, which can be activated by the Moon Orb, but they discover the Orb is missing, having been accidentally traded with a batch of Moon Fruits.

The party travel to the town of Queens, which has also been attacked by the Genie. While searching a shipwreck for the Orb, Toan finds a lamp that releases a friendly genie, Ruby, who joins them. They eventually find the Moon Orb, but are unable to summon the Moon Ship. As such, they head to the Sun and Moon Temple in Muska Lacka, where the Moon Ship is located. There, they meet a sand warrior named Ungaga, who joins them and helps them activate the Moon Ship. They travel to the Moon city of Yellow Drops, and meet Osmond, a Moon Person who asks for help in collecting the scattered pieces of a giant battle robot called the Sun Giant, which the Moon People believe can destroy the Genie outright. When the Sun Giant is complete, the party and a crew of Moon People travel to Dark Heaven Castle, where the Genie now resides.

They attack and defeat the Genie, only to learn that they were actually fighting a transformed mouse that had absorbed a fraction of the real Genie's powers. The true Dark Genie has possessed Flag, and destroys the Sun Giant. The Genie's power proves too great for Flag's body, and he dies, leaving the Genie without a host. Toan and the crew are rescued by Dran, and the party pursue the Genie into the castle, where they encounter Seda, who tells them he is responsible for the existence of the Genie. He reveals he was King of the East, and was losing a war to the West. He was approached by a dark wizard, who offered him the power to win the war. After winning, the dark power remained in his body, and after a tragic loss, it was released in the form of the Genie. Seda learned the only thing strong enough to defeat the Genie was Atlamillia. No Atlamillia would exist for another 400 years, so he opened a portal to the future. He tells Toan the only way to stop the Genie is to prevent his birth in the past, and opens the Gallery of Time to allow the party to travel back to the past. As the Genie attempts to repossess Seda, Seda kills himself.

In the Gallery of Time, the party learn the tragic loss suffered by Seda was the death of Sophia, his fiancée, at the hands of an assassin seeking to kill him. The party are unable to prevent Sophia's death and the subsequent birth of the Genie, but they face the Genie's original form, and are able to defeat it. Toan then expends the Atlamilla's powers to revive Sophia, reuniting her with the Seda of the past, and preventing the birth of the Genie. Upon doing so, the party is returned to its own time, and the Fairy King informs them the Genie is gone, for now.

== Development ==
Georama mode, which allows players to rebuild towns and villages.

Dark Cloud was the first game from developer Level-5, led by president and CEO Akihiro Hino, who also wrote, produced and designed the game. Development began immediately when the company was founded in October 1998 with a projected development time of two years. When the PlayStation 2 was announced in March 1999, Sony president and CEO Ken Kutaragi used an early demo of Dark Cloud to show the capabilities of the platform. The demo showed a magic carpet flying through a valley, and some waterfall effects.

In September 1999, Sony showed an early playable version of the game at the Tokyo Game Show. This version of the game was also shown at a US demonstration at Las Vegas for COMDEX in November as well in a presentation done by Phil Harrison of Sony. This version featured a character who must return a floating piece of land back to where it originally came from, but this original location has been usurped by an evil kingdom. Georama mode was a major component of the demo, with both IGN and GameSpot comparing it to Legend of Mana's "Land Make" system. At E3 in May 2000, a 30% complete playable demo was shown. IGN's Dave Zdyrko praised the graphics, especially the water and lighting effects. The demo was mainly centered in Norune Village, and although it did feature one accessible dungeon, the camerawork for the dungeon portions of the game had yet to be finalized.

The game was announced in 2000. In December, GameSpot previewed the game, calling Toan "Link with an Ali Baba twist". They compared the combat system to The Legend of Zelda: Ocarina of Time and the duels to Shenmue, and then the graphics, water effects and transitions from day to night. IGN wrote that "without fully playing through the game, it's very hard to determine whether or not this title will prove to be revolutionary or just a gimmicky way to show off the real-time rendering powers of the new console".

The English language release of Dark Cloud in May 2001 had additional gameplay features, including new weapons and monsters, improved AI, extra duels and an extra dungeon after completing the game, the Demon Shaft; this location does not appear in the Japanese version.

=== Music ===
The game's music was composed, arranged, and produced by Tomohito Nishiura. A full forty-six track soundtrack was released by Sony Music Entertainment Visual Works in Japan on January 11, 2001.

=== Emulated re-release ===
An emulated version for the PlayStation 4, available through PlayStation Store, was released in December 2015, with features including 1080p graphical resolution, trophy support, Remote Play, Share Play compatibility and second screen support for PlayStation Vita and PlayStation App.

== Reception ==
Reception

Aggregate score
Aggregator	Score
Metacritic	80/100

Review scores
Publication	Score
Destructoid	(PS4) 8.5/10
Edge	7/10
Electronic Gaming Monthly	8.33/10 (Note: Two critics of Electronic Gaming Monthly gave the game each a score of 8/10, and the other gave it 9/10.)
EP Daily	8/10
Famitsu	28/40
Game Informer	9/10
GameRevolution	B
GameSpot	8.1/10
GameSpy	79%
IGN	8.4/10
Next Generation	2/5
Official U.S. PlayStation Magazine	4.5/5
RPGFan	(S.H.) 83% (M.B.) 70%
X-Play	3/5
The Cincinnati Enquirer	4/5

Dark Cloud received "generally favorable reviews" according to the review aggregation website Metacritic. However, Blake Fischer of NextGen said of the game in his negative review: "Not quite Zelda. Not quite ActRaiser. Not quite fun." In Japan, Famitsu gave it a score of one eight, two sevens, and one six for a total of 28 out of 40.

Gameplay was compared by several critics to The Legend of Zelda: Ocarina of Time, while the weapon system was likened to Vagrant Story. GameSpot's Shane Satterfield and IGN's Dave Zdyrko both felt the Georama mode borrowed elements from ActRaiser. GameSpot, IGN and Game Informer's Andrew Reiner all praised the game for blending different types of gameplay together successfully. Satterfield argued "no game has blended all these compelling and unrelated ideas together into one highly addictive and surprisingly cohesive experience until now". Zdyrko called the game "a highly-enjoyable and insanely addictive role-playing experience that wouldn't have been able to stand alone with just its story, just its battle system, or any single one of its gameplay elements. The game works because each element aids in the enjoyment of the other parts." Reiner wrote: "The overall design may not be the best, yet you'll be completely engrossed with Dark Cloud's play. Completists will want to obtain every item and weapon. Action fans will drool over the combat. Sim junkies will admire the town building. A rarity for RPGs, Dark Cloud truly does have a little something for everyone."

The battle system received mixed reviews. AllGame's J.C. Barnes found the game's use of elemental attacks awkward: "Rooms can have anywhere from three to five monsters at a time, each having different elemental attributes. This means that gamers will most likely have to kill a monster that's weak against a specific attribute, open the weapon menu, select another attribute for the other monster, close the menu and repeat until all the monsters are defeated." He also found the dungeon crawling aspect somewhat repetitive. Uncle Dust of GamePro called the fighting "monotonous", arguing that the game "doesn't do the basics right." (Note: GamePro gave the game 4/5 for graphics, 2.5/5 for sound, and two 3.5/5 scores for control and fun factor.)

Reviews of the plot were also mixed. Zydrko thought the story was "good enough to keep you wanting to find out more." Barnes was less impressed, writing "While there are hints of talent behind some of the story elements, there needs to be more emphasis on creative, original storytelling if Dark Cloud is going to become a franchise capable of going head to head with The Legend of Zelda." GameRevolution's Johnny Liu called the plot and characters "ho-hum".

Reviews of the graphics were also mixed. Barnes was critical, writing: "Pop in is extremely widespread in dungeons and towns. Also dungeon textures are bland and repetitive." Liu wrote: "Graphically, Dark Cloud is colorful if a bit bland. It simply looks like a first generation game." On the other hand, Reiner wrote that "all of the models, effects, and textures are sumptuous." Zydrko was more ambivalent: "Dark Cloud isn't a bad-looking game by any means. The character models actually look really good, completely with jag-free edges, lots of texture detail and really cool designs [...] What hurts Dark Cloud is its background graphics. There's a lot of flickering in the backgrounds, plus clipping problems can be found, there are some instances where you'll see seams in the textures, and the background textures are poorly designed in that they look like floor and wall tiles in the outside environments." Satterfield had similarly mixed views: "Dark Cloud's graphics can be both stunning and disappointing. All six characters look great, and it's obvious that a great deal of time was taken in crafting their personalities through animation [...] Graphical tricks like real-time shadows, depth blur, and particle effects are prevalent in most settings," but also felt: "By the third stage of each dungeon, things become undeniably monotonous due to constantly reused textures and objects. Other graphical problems include flickering textures and a camera that regularly gets stuck behind objects while your character is locked on to an enemy."

Even reviewers who were critical of certain aspects of the game tended to give positive conclusions. Barnes wrote: "Despite all of its flaws, the positives of Dark Cloud outweigh any negatives." Zydrko wrote: "The whole of the game is definitely much greater than its parts [...] Dark Cloud offers a splendid mix of several existing genres and game ideas that when merged brings forth a delightful and extremely addictive adventure role-playing game that's easily one of the best we've yet seen on PlayStation 2." Satterfield concluded that "This game will handsomely reward those who invest the time to learn the nuances of its weapons system. While it's not the Zelda for the PlayStation 2 everyone was hoping for, Dark Cloud puts its own significant stamp on the adventure-RPG genre."

During the Academy of Interactive Arts & Sciences' 5th Annual Interactive Achievement Awards, the game was nominated for the "Console Role-Playing" award, which went to Baldur's Gate: Dark Alliance. It was also nominated at The Electric Playground's 2001 Blister Awards for the "Best Console RPG" award, but lost to Final Fantasy X.

=== Sales ===
The game initially sold quite poorly, despite new marketing attempts broadly made in the relatively new online market of banner ads. During its debut week in Japan, it entered the charts at number 15, selling only 19,615 units. By the end of 2000, it had sold 35,783 units, making it to the 286th highest selling game of the year, across all systems. In 2001, it sold a further 34,688 units, for a total of 70,471 units. Nevertheless, it proved to have much stronger sales internationally, and ultimately sold over 800,000 units worldwide. By July 2006, the game had sold 670,000 units and earned $22 million in the U.S. NextGen ranked it as the 95th highest-selling game launched for the PlayStation 2, Xbox or GameCube between October 2000 and July 2006 in that country. Combined sales of the Dark Cloud series reached 1 million units in the U.S. by July 2006. The game had sold 100,000 copies in Japan and 1 million in the United States by 2014.
