= RKS Design =

American design company

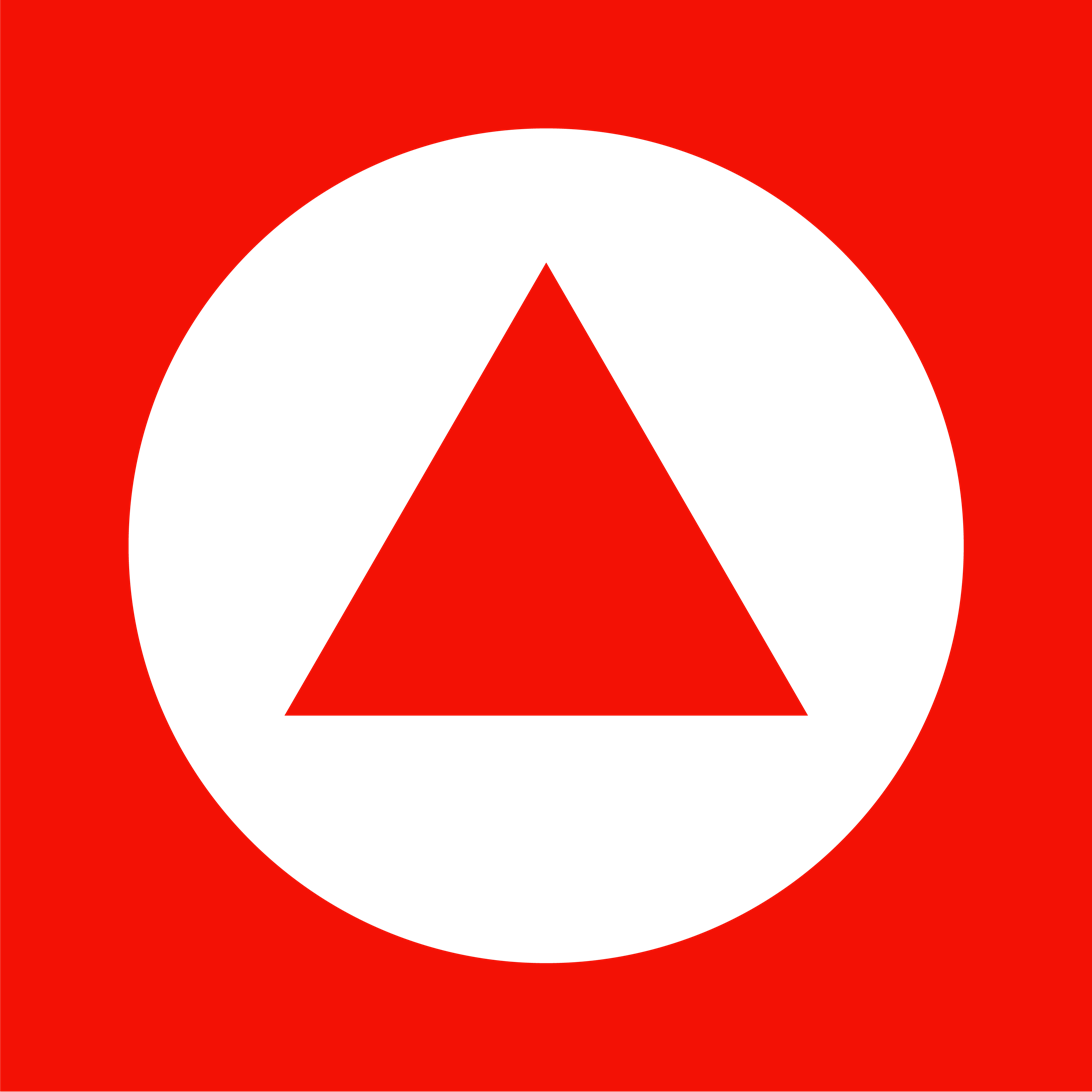
- Type: Private
- Founded: 1980; 46 years ago in Thousand Oaks, USA
- Founder: Ravi Sawhney
- Headquarters: Thousand Oaks, California
- Number of employees: 30
- Subsidiaries: RKS Guitars Loan Gifting
- Website: https://rksdesign.com/

RKS Design is a product design firm, industrial design firm, product development company, innovation consultancy, and product engineering firm, founded in 1980 by designer Ravi Sawhney. The design firm is headquartered outside of Los Angeles, California in Thousand Oaks, California. The company designs and develops consumer, medical, and industrial products, as well as user interfaces, and user experiences. As an industrial design and development firm, it is known for designing Teddy Ruxpin and RKS Guitars.

== Design projects ==
The company also designed a design-thinking methodology called Psycho-Aesthetics, a process that helps designers focus on understanding consumer need and emotion in order to create new products. Psycho-Aesthetics is taught at UCLA, USC, SCAD, and Harvard Business School.

Using the approach, the company designed Lego's sustainable packaging, Teddy Ruxpin, a popular children's toy in the 1980s and early 1990s, the RKS Guitar, a sustainable electric guitar, in collaboration with Dave Mason, Gamevice mobile controller for Wikipad, and cAIR transportation concept.

== Psycho-Aesthetics ==
RKS Founder Ravi Sawhney has published three books under the title of Psycho-Aesthetics. Psycho Aesthetics is a design-thinking methodology used to create hardware, software products.

== See also ==
- Ammunition Design
- IDEO
- Frog Design
- Product design
- Industrial design
- Mechanical engineering
