= Archos GamePad =

Video gaming tablet

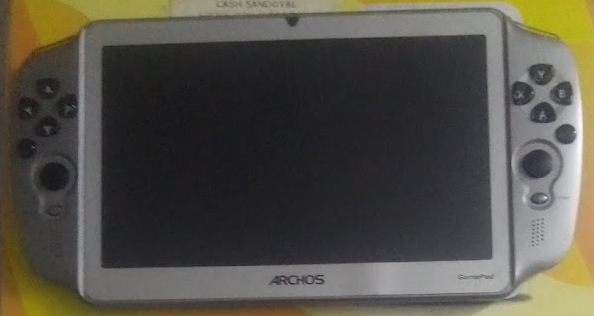
- An Archos Gamepad
- Developer: Archos
- Type: Tablet
- Released: EU: 6 December 2012; USA: February 2013
- Introductory price: €150, £130, US$170
- Operating system: Android 4.1 Jelly Bean
- CPU: Dual-core Rockchip RK3066 @ 1.6 GHz
- Memory: 1024 MB
- Storage: 8 GB internal, with expandable microSD up to 64GB
- Display: 7" capacitive touchscreen @ 1024x600 px
- Graphics: Mali-400 quad-core
- Controller input: Built-in
- Connectivity: Wi-Fi, Mini-HDMI, USB 2.0
- Online services: Google Play
- Dimensions: 229.8mm x 118.7mm x 15.4mm
- Successor: Archos GamePad 2

The Archos GamePad was a video gaming tablet developed and marketed by Archos. It ran on the Android operating system. It was announced on August 29, 2012, and was first released on 6 December 2012 in Europe, with a US release projected for February 2013. The tablet was aimed at gaming, and features dedicated dual analog sticks along with regular gaming keys and shoulder buttons - a similar design as the PlayStation Vita. Archos have designed a technology which 'converts' the touch controls (of Android games) into physical controls from the buttons. It was able to get over a thousand games from the Google Play library.

Archos GamePad features a 7-inch screen, 8GB of internal storage, 16 physical buttons, a 0.3 MP front camera, and stereo speakers. It was 10mm thick and weights 300 grams. Archos developed a special mapping software for developers to officially make their game(s) compatible with the GamePad's physical buttons.

== Release ==
Archos retailed GamePad in the UK for £130, although Archos originally had said that the tablet will sell for "under £130" The GamePad has a 7" screen.

== Reception ==
The Archos GamePad received largely negative reviews. Poor battery life, low screen quality and uncomfortable controls were among the most frequently mentioned complaints.

== Gamepad 2 ==
In August 2013, it was revealed that Archos is working on a successor, called Archos GamePad 2.

== See also ==
- Wii U GamePad
- JXD S7300
- Wikipad
