= Barbara Kessler =

American folk-rock singer-songwriter (born 1962)

Barbara Kessler (born 1962) is an American folk-rock singer-songwriter. She began her career performing in clubs on Cape Cod and driving an ice cream truck, then began performing at open mikes in Boston, and continues to be part of the Boston folk scene. Perhaps her best-known composition is "Deep Country", which first appeared on 1994's live Stranger to this Land.

She was also featured in the 2005 video game Rogue Galaxy in which she performs the theme song "Dreaming My Way Home".

== Discography ==
- Barbara Kessler Live (1992)
- Stranger to This Land (1994)
- Notion (1996)
- Barbara Kessler (2000)
- What You Keep (2012)

== Compilations ==
- Fast Folk, Boston Revisited (1992)
- Big Times in a Small Town, Rounder (1992)
- Follow That Road, Rounder (1993)
- Grooves 2, Time Life Music, Warner Special Products (1995)
- Woman's Work, Putumayo World Music (1996)
- Life, AAA (1996)
- This Is Boston, Not Austin (1997)
- Big League Babe: The Christine Lavin Tribute Album, Pt. 1 (1997)
- Women of Kerrville, Vol. 2 (1999)
- Respond (1999)
- Kerville End of the Century (2000)
- Folk For Stroke (2006)
- Paint It Black: An Alt Country Tribute To The Rolling Stones (2011)
