= List of PlayStation games =

List of PlayStation games may refer to:

- List of PlayStation (console) video games:
  - List of PlayStation (console) games (A–L)
  - List of PlayStation (console) games (M–Z)
- List of video games for other Sony PlayStation consoles:
  - List of PlayStation 2 games (A–K)
  - List of PlayStation 2 games (L–Z)
  - List of PlayStation 3 games (A–C)
  - List of PlayStation 3 games (D–I)
  - List of PlayStation 3 games (J–P)
  - List of PlayStation 3 games (Q–Z)
  - List of PlayStation 4 games (A–L)
  - List of PlayStation 4 games (M–Z)
  - List of PlayStation 5 games
- List of portable PlayStation games:
  - List of PlayStation Portable games
  - List of PlayStation Vita games (A–D)
  - List of PlayStation Vita games (E–H)
  - List of PlayStation Vita games (I–L)
  - List of PlayStation Vita games (M–O)
  - List of PlayStation Vita games (P–R)
  - List of PlayStation Vita games (S)
  - List of PlayStation Vita games (T–V)
  - List of PlayStation Vita games (W–Z)
  - List of cancelled PlayStation Vita games
