= Gaikai =

Company which provides technology for the streaming of high-end video games

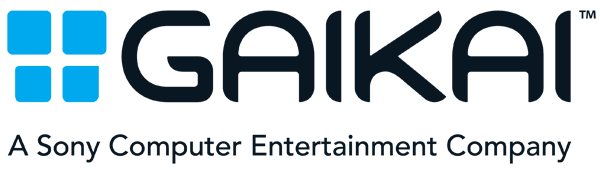
- Website type: Subsidiary
- Founded: November 2008; 18 years ago
- Dissolved: 2017 (Integrated into Sony Interactive Entertainment)
- Headquarters: Aliso Viejo, California, U.S.
- Founders: David Perry, Rui Pereira, Andrew Gault
- Key people: David Perry, Robert Stevenson, Mark Anderson, Rui Pereira, Ueli Gallizzi, Ryan Breed, Colin DuPre
- Services: Cloud gaming, game streaming technology, gaming on demand, remote play, video game and software advertising and distribution service
- Parent: Sony Interactive Entertainment (2012–2017)

Gaikai (Japanese: 外海; lit. "open sea", i.e. an expansive outdoor space) was an American company which provided technology for the streaming of high-end video games. Its technology had multiple applications, including in-home streaming over a local wired or wireless network (as in Remote Play between the PlayStation 4 and PlayStation Vita), as well as cloud-based gaming where video games are rendered on remote servers and delivered to end users via internet streaming (such as the PlayStation Now game streaming service.)

Founded and registered in Netherlands in 2008 as "Gaikai B.V.", it was acquired by Sony Interactive Entertainment in 2012. As a startup, before its acquisition by Sony, the company announced many partners using the technology from 2010 through 2012 including game publishers, web portals, retailers and consumer electronics manufacturers. On July 2, 2012, Sony announced that a formal agreement had been reached to acquire the company for US$380 million with plans of establishing their own new cloud-based gaming service, as well as integrating streaming technology built by Gaikai into PlayStation products, resulting in PlayStation Now and Remote Play.

== History ==
Gaikai was initially (pre-Sony acquisition) funded by Intel Capital, Limelight Networks, Rustic Canyon Partners, Benchmark Capital, TriplePoint Capital, NEA and Qualcomm. Its streaming service was embedded on game-related websites and microsites, social media site such as Facebook, and within specific products (such as smart mobile devices or digital TVs), as determined by the publisher. Users did not need to navigate to an online registration portal or download any software to access the games. Gaikai recommended an Internet connection of 5 Mbit/s or faster, and a 3 Mbit/s connection met the minimum system requirements. Gaikai's proprietary technology ran inside web browsers, in part, by using previously installed plug-ins such as Java or Adobe Flash, or alternately without using any plug-ins, as demonstrated at Google I/O 2012, where Gaikai showed a version of the service using the Google Native Client (NaCl). A demo video early on in the service, at GDC San Francisco 2010, showed Call of Duty 4: Modern Warfare, World of Warcraft, EVE Online, Spore, Mario Kart 64 and Adobe Photoshop all running in Adobe Flash player. In May 2010, Gaikai demonstrated World of Warcraft running on the iPad using its game streaming technology. Gaikai's technology officially came out of a public Beta test and launched internationally on February 27, 2011, with Dead Space 2, The Sims 3, Spore, and Mass Effect 2.

=== Services ===
Gaikai operated two business models for its cloud gaming services before the acquisition: Ad Network and Open Platform.

In the Ad Network model, at the end of the demo the customer was given the option to purchase the game or product from a local retailer, online store or direct-to-drive download service. The Ad Network included the Gaikai Affiliate Network which launched on June 2, 2011 reaching over 10 million monthly active users by late 2011. Websites which joined the network were able to stream high-end PC games as embedded advertising, and in exchange received a share of the marketing revenue generated from games streamed to consumers, who played the demos free of charge. Gaikai-enabled games had been integrated into YouTube, EA's Origin, and Ubisoft's UBIShop in late 2011. In April 2012, Gaikai launched its service embedded inside Facebook, allowing games to be streamed directly in the Facebook canvas.

Meanwhile, the Open Platform model allowed streaming full games to PCs, digital TVs, tablets and smart mobile devices. The first mobile partnership came in May 2012, streaming games to the Wikipad tablet. In June 2012, Samsung announced a cloud gaming service powered by Gaikai to stream AAA games to its high end LED Smart TVs.

== Acquisition by Sony Computer Entertainment ==
On July 2, 2012, shortly after rumors on the Internet started to appear, Sony Computer Entertainment announced that it had reached an agreement to acquire the cloud-based service for US$380 million. Gaikai launched their revamped website in October 2012, teasing top PlayStation branded titles including God of War, Infamous and LittleBigPlanet among other titles.

=== Products ===
==== Remote Play ====
On February 20, 2013, Gaikai was announced to be developing the next generation of Remote Play, streaming games from the PlayStation 4 to the PlayStation Vita. Remote Play between the PS Vita and PS4 launched with the PS4 in November 2013.

==== Share Play ====
In late 2014, Share Play was launched, allowing users to play with a friend as if you were in the same room. This system enables users to play as they were watching the same screen remotely, and even virtually handing the controller to their friends.

==== PlayStation Now ====
At the January 2014 Consumer Electronics Show, Sony announced the PlayStation Now (PS Now) game streaming service, powered by technology from Gaikai. The service was initially discussed in February 2013, when it was revealed that PlayStation, PlayStation 2, and PlayStation 3 titles would be made available for Sony's upcoming PlayStation 4 console via a new cloud gaming service. At E3 2013, Sony had announced that the new game streaming service would launch in 2014. At CES it was revealed that in addition to PlayStation platforms (PS4 and PS3 systems, followed by PS Vita), PlayStation Now would come to most 2014 US models of Sony's BRAVIA TV.

== Announced partnerships ==
- June 17, 2010: Electronic Arts
- July 20, 2010: Intel
- July 20, 2010: Limelight Networks
- March 8, 2011: Video Games Blogger
- April 5, 2011: Bigfoot Networks
- June 2, 2011: The Escapist
- June 8, 2011: Gamer4Eva
- June 8, 2011: Eurogamer
- June 21, 2011: Walmart
- July 5, 2011: Capcom
- August 22, 2011: CD Projekt
- October 11, 2011: Level 3 Communications
- October 20, 2011: YouTube
- January 4, 2012: Best Buy
- January 4, 2012: Ubisoft
- January 10, 2012: LG Electronics
- January 12, 2012: Green Man Gaming
- March 2, 2012: GAME
- March 8, 2012: Warner Bros.
- April 30, 2012: Gamesload
- May 2, 2012: WikiPad
- May 15, 2012: Nvidia
- May 15, 2012: Meteor Entertainment
- May 22, 2012: Autodesk
- June 4, 2012: En Masse Entertainment
- June 5, 2012: Samsung
- June 6, 2012: Machinima, Inc.
- July 2, 2012: Sony

== See also ==
- List of cloud gaming providers
