= Cloud gaming =

Streaming of video games as video to clients via cloud computing

Cloud gaming, sometimes called gaming on demand or game streaming, is a type of online gaming that runs video games on remote servers and streams the game's output (video, sound, etc.) directly to a user's device, or more colloquially, playing a game remotely from a cloud. It contrasts with traditional means of gaming, wherein a game is run locally on a user's video game console, personal computer, or mobile device.

== Background ==
Cloud gaming platforms operate in a similar manner to remote desktops and Photo on demand services; games are stored and executed remotely on a provider's dedicated hardware, and streamed as video to a player's device via client software. The client software handles the player's inputs, which are sent back to the server and executed in-game. Some cloud gaming services are based on access to a virtualized Windows environment, allowing users to download and install games and software as they normally would on a local computer.

Cloud gaming can be advantageous as it eliminates the need to purchase expensive computer hardware or install games directly onto a local game system. Cloud gaming can be made available on a wide range of computing devices, including mobile devices such as smartphones and tablets, digital media players, or proprietary thin client-like devices. Some services may offer additional features to take advantage of this model, including the ability for a viewer to join a player's session and temporarily take control of the game.

Due to their dependency on high-quality streaming video, cloud gaming services typically require reliable, high-speed internet connections with low latency. Even with high-speed connections available, traffic congestion and other issues affecting network latency can affect the performance of cloud gaming, and the ability to use a service regularly may also be limited by data caps enforced by some internet service providers.

Further, the costs of cloud gaming shift from traditional distribution through retail outlets and digital storefronts to the data servers that run the cloud gaming services. Novel cost structures are required to cover these operating costs compared to traditional distribution.

== Infrastructure considerations ==
Cloud gaming requires significant infrastructure for the services to work as intended, including data centers and server farms for running the games, and high-bandwidth internet connections with low latency for delivering the streams to users. The network infrastructure required to make cloud gaming feasible was, for many years, not available in most geographic areas, or unavailable to consumer markets.

A major factor in the quality of a cloud gaming service is latency, as the amount of delay between the user's inputs and when they take effect can affect gameplay — especially in fast-paced games dependent on precise inputs (such as first-person shooters and fighting games). Attempts to reduce latency include the use of caching as the cached data can be "stored locally ... and can be retrieved when required."

The provider's dedicated hardware can be upgraded over time in order to support higher resolutions and frame rates for rendering and streams. The Quality of Experience (QoE) that measures the user's general level of satisfaction also needs to be brought into consideration during the development phase of cloud gaming.

== History ==
=== Early attempts ===
The first demonstrated approach of cloud gaming technology was by startup G-cluster (short for Game Cluster), which introduced its product at the 2000 E3, and released around 2003. In their initial model around 2005, G-cluster provided PC games that ran on their servers, using video-on-demand service providers, set-top box manufacturers, and middleware software providers to help provide their service to network operators, and then offered the games through portals to end users. By 2010, due to changes in the market, G-cluster changed their model to work through a large server manufacturer to provide their games to the network operators and directly to users. This refocusing was necessitated by the increased available of free-to-play games available for personal computers, drawing them away from G-cluster's service, so G-cluster opted to focus on Internet Protocol television (IPTV) users instead, which had a potential target of about three million users in 2010. French telco SFR launched G-cluster gaming service in 2010 for its end users and Orange followed suit in 2012 offering the gaming service for its customers. Both services have been commercially operational ever since offering cloud gaming for their customers on TV and mobile.

In early 2003, another attempt was announced by American company Infinium Labs, which intended to revolutionize the market of home entertainment with their Phantom video game console, a device that was envisioned to be capable of providing an on-demand video game delivery service via monthly online subscription. The Phantom was designed to run PC games, thus making it compatible with hundreds of titles from the start, and was to be sold at a much lower price than high-end PC gaming rigs. A functioning prototype was first presented at the E3 2004, running Unreal Tournament 2004, and then again at QuakeCon, where it was shown to be capable of perfectly operating Quake 3 Arena on a dedicated server. After a couple of years of setbacks, the company bankrupted in 2008, with the Phantom console never officially released to the market, becoming one of the most popular vaporware of recent times.

Video game developer Crytek began the research on a cloud gaming system in 2005 for Crysis, but according to their CEO Cevat Yerli, they halted development in 2007 to wait until the infrastructure and cable Internet providers were able to complete the task and the cost of bandwidth to decline.

=== OnLive and Gaikai ===
Entrepreneur Steve Perlman revealed OnLive at the March 2009 Game Developers Conference. Perlman stated that with improvements in data and video compression as well as the capabilities of smartphones, the potential for cloud gaming was now timely. OnLive was officially launched in June 2010, alongside the sale of its OnLive microconsole. While OnLive had acquired some support from large publishers like Ubisoft, 2K Games and THQ, they found it difficult to get other publishers on board as they were wary of the subscription price model.

Simultaneous to OnLive, another startup Gaikai was announced by David Perry in 2010. Gaikai opted to approach streaming of game demos rather than full games, making the service a form of online advertising for games. Gaikai gained far more publisher support, including Electronic Arts which OnLive had been trying to bring back to their service. Gaikai was acquired by Sony Computer Entertainment in July 2012 for $340 million, and by October 2012, it was offering PlayStation games. Ultimately, the technology behind Gaikai was used as the foundation for PlayStation Now, first introduced in 2014.

OnLive was never profitable, and after a possible acquisition by HP Inc. fell through, OnLive's assets were acquired by a newly formed entity named "OL2", which was capitalized by Gary Lauder of Lauder Partners in 2012 at $4.8 million, a fraction of OnLive's valuation from 2010. A mass layoff (2/3 of staff) was conducted to reduce operating costs. Under Lauder Partners, the new OL2 attempted to pivot its business model to allow streaming of games already owned by the user, but this failed to be profitable. OnLive and OL2's intellectual property were acquired by Sony Computer Entertainment in April 2015, but it then closed them down about a month later. As stated by The Verge, the acquisition of both Gaikai and OnLive's intellectual property gave Sony access to a range of patents covering cloud gaming.

=== Later advancements and adoption by the industry ===
Nvidia first announced its cloud gaming service, Nvidia Grid (later rebranded as GeForce Now), as a combination of hardware using its graphics processing units and software in May 2012, initially intending to partner with Gaikai for games on the service. Ubitus GameCloud was also introduced alongside Nvidia's Grid. GameCloud was designed as white-label service based on Nvidia's Grid that other providers could use to offer game streaming to their customers.

Grid was formally introduced as part of its Nvidia Shield Android TV device during the 2013 International Consumer Electronics Show. Grid/GeForce Now launched with services provided by several cloud gaming partners including Agawi, Cloudunion, Cyber Cloud, G-cluster, Playcast, and Ubitus. The Grid service was first launched in North America in November 2014 where a limited number of games were made available, and then later expanded to computers in 2017, including support for importing a user's Steam and Epic Games Store library to run on the remote instance. This importing model was criticized by publishers including Activision Blizzard and Bethesda Softworks, as purchases were only intended for personal computers and not through cloud gaming. The publishers forced NVidia to pull these games from their service.

In 2014, Dragon Quest X was brought to Nintendo 3DS in Japan using Ubitus for the streaming technology.

In 2017, the French startup Blade launched a service known as Shadow, where users are able to rent a remote Windows 10 instance on a datacenter, with allocated access to an Intel Xeon processor and Nvidia Quadro graphics. The service is geographically limited based on proximity to one of its datacenters; it initially launched in France, but began expanding into the United States in 2019.

In May 2018, Electronic Arts acquired cloud gaming assets and talent from GameFly for an undisclosed amount. EA subsequently announced "Project Atlas", a project to explore the integration of artificial intelligence, machine learning, and Frostbite engine technology to create a "unified" platform to "remotely process and stream blockbuster, multiplayer HD games with the lowest possible latency, and also to unlock even more possibilities for dynamic social and cross-platform play." That month, Google and Microsoft also announced cloud gaming initiatives, with Google beginning to pilot "Project Stream" (including a closed beta featuring Assassin's Creed Odyssey running via a client in the Google Chrome web browser, and Microsoft announced the upcoming Project xCloud, leveraging Microsoft Azure technology.

At the Game Developers Conference in 2019, Google officially announced its cloud gaming service Stadia, which officially launched on November 19 of that year. In May, Sony announced a partnership with Microsoft to co-develop cloud solutions between divisions, including gaming.

Apple Inc., which makes the iOS platform for iPhones and iPads, had looked to block cloud gaming apps on its service in mid-2020. They argued that cloud gaming services allowed developers to add games onto the iOS system that bypassed the normal checks they perform on any app before it is added to the App Store, and thus violated their terms of service. However, in September 2020, Apple altered its rules that allowed cloud gaming apps to work on iOS, with restrictions that each game must be offered as an individual download on the iOS store which the user must use before playing, though catalog apps as part of the service can list and link to these games. Both GeForce Now and Stadia announced plans in November 2020 to release iOS versions of their streaming services as progressive web applications that would be run through a Chrome or Safari browser on iOS devices, as allowed for by Apple, to support cloud gaming. Microsoft has also announced plans to use a similar approach to bring the xCloud game streaming technology to iOS via the browser sometime in early 2021.

Amazon introduced its own cloud gaming service Luna in September 2020. Games on the service will be offered via a channel-style subscription service, with Amazon's own games and those from Ubisoft available at the service's launch.

Nintendo currently has games on Nintendo Switch that primarily run on cloud gaming such as Control, Hitman 3, Marvel's Guardians of the Galaxy, and the Kingdom Hearts franchise, using Ubitus.

== Future ==
=== GPU resource sharing ===
A proposed method to improve game streaming's scalability is adaptive graphics processing unit (GPU) resource scheduling. Most cloud gaming providers are using dedicated GPUs to each person playing a game. This leads to the best performance but can waste resources. With better GPU resource scheduling algorithms, if the game does not fully utilize that GPU it can be used to help run someone else's game simultaneously. In the past, “GPU virtualization was not used due to the inferior performance of the resource scheduling algorithm”. However new resource management algorithms have been developed that can allow up to 90% of the GPUs original power to be utilized even while being split among many users.

=== Predictive input ===
Algorithms could be used to help predict a player's next inputs, which could overcome the impact of latency in cloud gaming applications. Stadia's head of engineering Majd Bakar foresaw the future possibility of using such a concept to "[reduce] latency to the point where it's basically nonexistent", referring to this concept as "negative latency".

== See also ==
- 2010s in video games
- 2020s in video games
- Remote mobile virtualization for mobile gaming as a service
- Stream processing
- Real-time data
