= PlayStation Now =

Sony cloud gaming subscription service

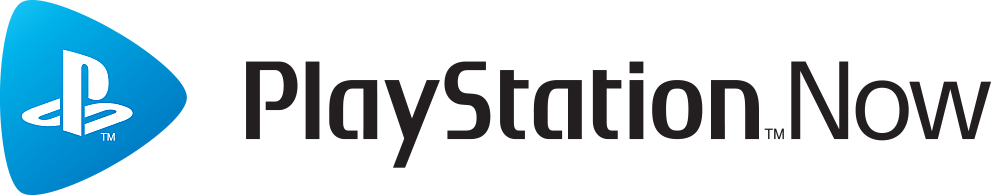
- Developer: Sony Interactive Entertainment
- Type: Video game subscription service
- Launched: NA: January 28, 2014; UK: March 7, 2015; EU: April 15, 2016; JP: September 6, 2017
- Platforms: PlayStation 4 PlayStation 5 Windows
- Status: Merged with PlayStation Plus
- Members: 3.2 million (as of March 31, 2021)
- Pricing model: US$9.99 per month US$24.99 for 3 months US$59.99 per year
- Website: playstation.com/en-us/ps-now/ at the Wayback Machine (archived 2022-03-29)

PlayStation Now (PS Now) was a standalone video game subscription service on consoles developed by Sony Interactive Entertainment. The service offered cloud gaming for PlayStation 2, PlayStation 3, and PlayStation 4 games that could be played on PlayStation 4, PlayStation 5 and Microsoft Windows computers. In addition, PlayStation 2 and PlayStation 4 games could be downloaded to play locally on PlayStation 4 and PlayStation 5. With the expansion of the PlayStation Plus service to offer additional tiers in May–June 2022, the standalone PlayStation Now subscription was shut down, but its services were incorporated into the PlayStation Plus Premium tier.

No games could be downloaded to a PC. Downloaded games could be played without an internet connection, but internet connection was required for verification every few days.

Non-PlayStation devices required a DualShock 3, 4, DualSense, or any XInput-compatible controller, such as Xbox Wireless Controller, Elite Wireless Controller or Adaptive Controller, Logitech Gamepad F310, F510 or F710, Thrustmaster GP XID Pro, SteelSeries Stratus XL or Stratus Duo and Mad Catz C.A.T. 7, to use the service. If members intended to stream their games, Sony recommended that players have a minimum of 5 Mbps internet connection to achieve good performance.

== History ==
PlayStation Now was announced on January 7, 2014, at the 2014 Consumer Electronics Show powered by technology from Gaikai. At CES, Sony presented demos of The Last of Us, God of War: Ascension, Puppeteer, and Beyond: Two Souls, playable through PS Now on Bravia TVs and PlayStation Vita. The closed beta began in the United States on January 28 with PS3, and on May 19 was extended to PS4.

To implement the service, Sony created a single motherboard equivalent to 8 PS3 console units into a server rack to allow the games to function, as opposed to software emulation, due to architectural complexity.

PlayStation Now was launched in Open Beta in the United States and Canada on PS4 on July 31, 2014, on PS3 on September 18, 2014, on PS Vita and PS TV on October 14, 2014, with support for select 2014 Bravia TVs coming later in the year. At Gamescom 2014, SCE announced that PS Now would arrive in Europe in 2015, with the United Kingdom to be the first European country to access the service. On December 24, 2014, Sony announced that PlayStation Now would expand to the other electronic brands.

On CES 2015, Sony confirmed that PlayStation Now would arrive in North America on PS4 as a full release on January 13, 2015. On March 7, 2015, it was revealed that PlayStation Now was accessible in Europe. Official beta invites for Europe started going out to PS4 owners on April 15, 2015.

On February 17, 2017, Sony announced it would discontinue PlayStation Now on PlayStation 3, PlayStation Vita, PlayStation TV, Sony Bravia televisions (modeled between 2013 and 2015), Sony Blu-ray players and all Samsung televisions by August 15, 2017.

On September 20, 2018, Sony announced that users on PlayStation 4 would be able to download PlayStation 2 and PlayStation 4 games offered via the service as Sony started to gradually roll out the new feature to subscribers.

On January 23, 2019, Sony announced that the service would be launching in Spain, Italy, Portugal, Norway, Denmark, Finland and Sweden later in the year. A beta for these countries launched in early February and the full service launched on March 12, 2019.

On April 22, 2021, Sony announced that support for 1080p streaming would start rolling out during the week.

On December 3, 2021, Bloomberg reported that Sony was working on a new subscription service codenamed "Spartacus". The service would be a merger of the company's current services, PlayStation Plus, and PlayStation Now, with the company reportedly set to keep the Plus branding. The service would include three tiers: the first would include all the benefits that PlayStation Plus would include, the second would expand upon the first by including a catalog of titles, and the third one would expand upon the first two by including game trials as well as a catalog of games from the PlayStation, PlayStation 2, PlayStation 3, and PlayStation Portable.

On March 29, 2022, Sony officially announced the merger of the two services under the Plus branding. The merger took place over May and June 2022.

== Games ==
PlayStation 2, PlayStation 3, and PlayStation 4 games on PlayStation Now could be streamed to PlayStation 4, PlayStation 5, and PC. In 2020, there were over 800 games available, with over 300 of them available for download to PlayStation 4 and PlayStation 5. New games were added every month.

After a 7-day free trial, there were three pricing options available for the subscription service.

A separate subscription fee for online multiplayer was not required for PlayStation Now games. The three pricing options gave access to both single player and online multiplayer components.

== Availability ==
PlayStation Now was available in Europe (including Austria, Belgium, Denmark, Finland, France, Germany, Ireland, Italy, Luxembourg, the Netherlands, Norway, Portugal, Spain, Sweden, Switzerland and the United Kingdom), North America (Canada and the United States), as well as Japan.
