= PlayStation Portable system software =

System software for the PlayStation Portable

- Developer: Sony Computer Entertainment
- OS family: Proprietary
- Working state: Discontinued
- Source model: Closed source
- Initial release: December 12, 2004; 21 years ago (as 1.00)
- Final release: 6.61 / January 15, 2015; 11 years ago
- Available in: Chinese (Simplified), Chinese (Traditional), Dutch, English, French, Italian, Japanese, Korean, Portuguese, German, Russian, Spanish
- Update method: Direct Download; Download via PS3; Download via PC; Universal Media Disc
- Supported platforms: PlayStation Portable
- Default user interface: XrossMediaBar
- Preceded by: PocketStation
- Succeeded by: PlayStation Vita (system software)
- Official website: USA; Japan

Support status
- Unsupported

The PlayStation Portable system software is the official firmware for the PlayStation Portable (PSP). It uses the XrossMediaBar (XMB) as its user interface, similar to the PlayStation 3 console.

== Updates ==
Updates add new functionality as well as security patches to prevent unsigned code from being executed on the system. Updates can be obtained in four ways:

- Direct download to the PSP over Wi-Fi. This can be performed by choosing [Settings], [System Update] from the XMB.
- Download to a PC, then transfer to the PSP via a USB cable or Memory Stick.
- Included on the UMD of some games. These games may not run with earlier firmware than the version on their UMD. See also List of PlayStation Portable system software compatibilities.
- Download from a PS3 to a PSP system via USB cable (Japanese and American version only)

While system software updates can be used with consoles from any region, Sony recommends only downloading system software updates released for the region corresponding to the system's place of purchase. System software updates have added various features including a web browser, Adobe Flash Player 6 support, additional codecs for images, audio, and video, PlayStation 3 connectivity, as well as patches against several security exploits, vulnerabilities, and execution of homebrew programs. The battery must be at least 50% charged or else the system will prevent the update from installing. If the power supply is lost while writing to the system software, the console will no longer be able to operate unless the system is booted in service mode or sent to Sony for repair if still under warranty.

The current version of the software, 6.61, was made available on January 15, 2015. It is a minor update released more than three years after the release of the previous version 6.60 in 2011.

== Technology ==
=== Graphical shell ===
The PlayStation Portable uses the XrossMediaBar (XMB) as its graphical user interface, which is also used in the PlayStation 3 (PS3) console, a variety of Sony BRAVIA HDTVs, Blu-ray disc players and many more Sony products. XMB displays icons horizontally across the screen that be seen as categories. Users can navigate through them using the left and right buttons of the D-pad, which move the icons forward or back across the screen, highlighting just one at a time, as opposed to using any kind of pointer to select an option. When one category is selected, there are usually more specific options then available to select that are spread vertically above and below the selected icon. Users may navigate among these options by using the up and down buttons of the D-pad.

The basic features offered by XMB implementations varies based on device and software version. On the PSP console, the XMB had top level icons for Photos, Music, Videos, Games, Networking (which allows the use of the web browser), Settings and Extras. Also, XMB offers a degree of multitasking. With the PSP, using the Home button while playing music would allow users to browse photos without stopping the music. While XMB proved to be a successful user interface for Sony products such as PSP and PS3, the next generation Sony video game consoles such as the PlayStation 4 and the PlayStation Vita no longer use this user interface. For example, the XMB is replaced by the LiveArea interface on the PS Vita.

=== Web browser ===
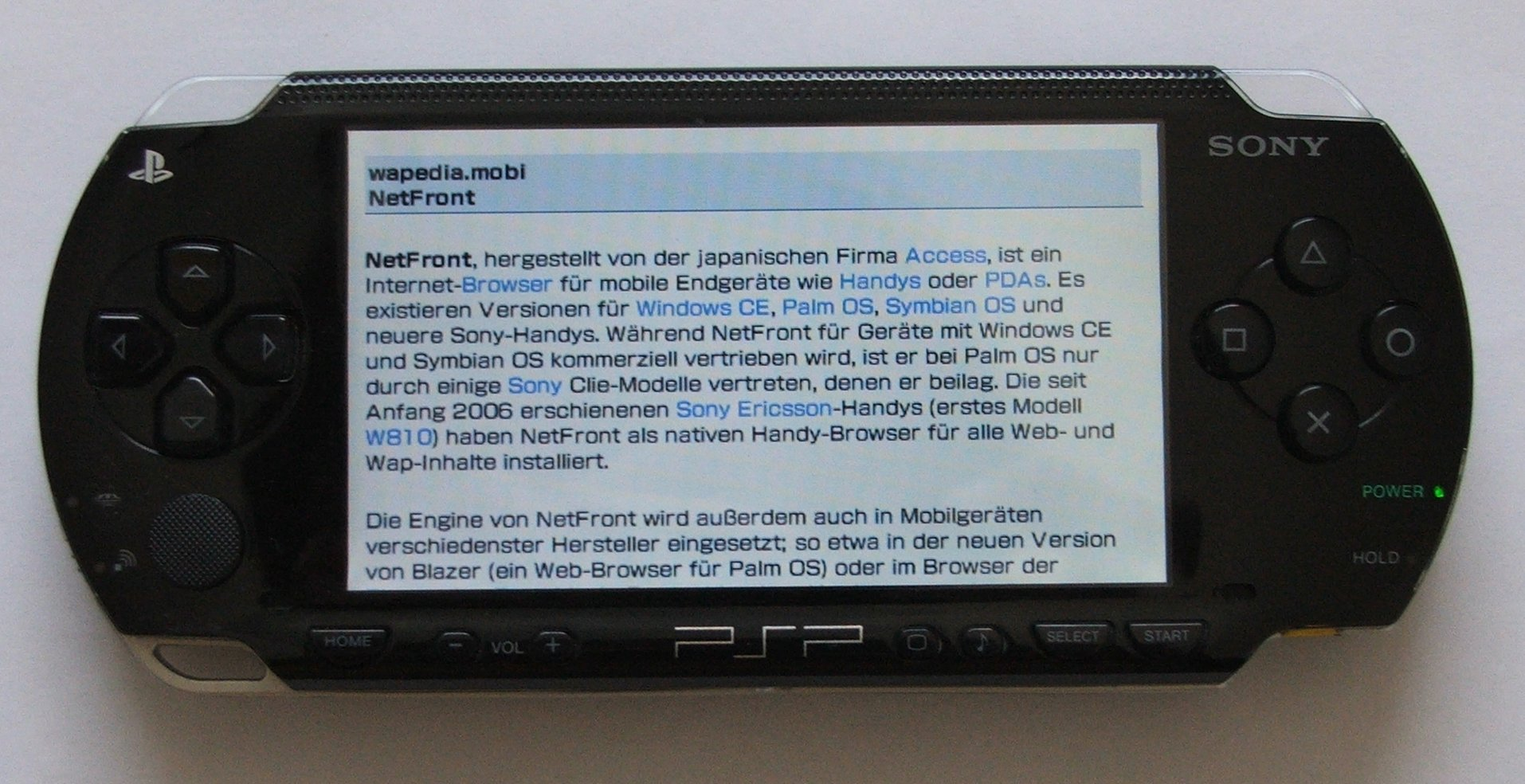
PlayStation Portable uses the NetFront Browser.

The PlayStation Portable comes with a web browser for browsing the Internet. The web browser is a version of the NetFront browser made by Access Co. Ltd. and was released for free with the 2.00 system software update. The browser supports most common web technologies, such as HTTP cookies, forms, CSS, as well as basic JavaScript capabilities.

The version 2.50 upgrade added Unicode (UTF-8) character encoding and Auto-Select as options in the browser's encoding menu, and also introduced the saving of input history for online forms.

Version 2.70 of the PSP's system software introduced basic Flash capabilities to the browser. However, the player runs Flash version 6, five iterations behind the current desktop version 11, making some websites difficult to view.

There are three different rendering modes: "Normal", "Just-Fit", and "Smart-Fit". "Normal" will display the page with no changes, "Just-Fit" will attempt to shrink some elements to make the whole page fit on the screen and preserve layout and "Smart-Fit" will display content in the order it appears in the HTML, and with no size adjustments; instead it will drop an element down below the preceding element if it starts to go off the screen.

The browser also has basic tabbed browsing capabilities, with a maximum of three tabs. When a website tries to open a link in a new window, the browser opens it in a new tab.

Parents can limit content by enabling Browser Start Up Control which blocks all access to the web browser and creating a 4-digit PIN under [Settings] in [Security]. Additionally, the browser can be configured to run under a proxy server and can be protected by the security PIN to enable the use of web filtering or monitoring software through a network. Recently, TrendMicro for PSP was added as a feature that can be enabled via a subscription to filter or monitor content on the PSP.

The PSP browser is slower compared to modern browsers and often runs out of memory due to limitations put in place by Sony. Alternatively, homebrew alternatives to the browser have been released that utilize all 32/64 MB of the PSP's RAM, which allows the browser to load pages faster and have more memory for larger pages. Opera Mini can also be used on PSP through PSPKVM, a homebrew application which is a Sun Java Virtual Machine. It was claimed to provide much faster loading times than the default browser and provides better web page compatibility.

=== Other features ===
Like many other video game consoles, the PlayStation Portable is capable of photo, audio, and video playback in a variety of formats. However, unlike Sony's home consoles such as the PlayStation 3 and the PlayStation 4, it is not possible to play Blu-ray or DVD movies on the PlayStation Portable directly since it lacks a standard Blu-ray or DVD drive. While it does have a UMD drive and there exist UMD movies, the UMD format never saw implementation on any device other than the PlayStation Portable and as a result, the market is very limited compared to those for other optical media formats. There have been no more movies released on UMD since 2011, with Harry Potter and the Deathly Hallows – Part 2 being one of the final releases on the format.

The PlayStation Portable also supports a feature known as Remote Play, which allows the PSP to access many features of a PlayStation 3 console from a remote location using the PS3's WLAN capabilities, a home network, or the Internet. However, unlike the later Remote Play feature between the PlayStation Vita and the PlayStation 4, the Remote Play capabilities between the PSP and the PS3 are much more limited. Although most of the PS3's capabilities related to its main user interface are accessible with Remote Play, playback of DVDs, Blu-ray Discs, PlayStation 2 games, most PlayStation 3 games, and copy-protected files stored on the PS3's hard drive are not supported. Actual Remote Play between the PSP and the PS3 games are only supported by a "select" very few PS3 titles.

Furthermore, PSP-2000, PSP-3000, and PSP-N1000 can use the Skype VoIP service starting with system software version 3.90. The service allows Skype calls to be made over Wi-Fi and on the PSP Go over the Bluetooth Modem feature. It is not possible to use the VoIP service on the original PSP-1000 console due to hardware limitations. There also existed other services for the PSP such as the Room for PlayStation Portable, similar to the PlayStation 3's online community-based service known as PlayStation Home.

Go!Messenger, a free instant messaging program jointly developed by Sony Computer Entertainment Europe and BT Group, was announced on August 22, 2007 at the Leipzig Games Convention, and was released on February 29, 2008, also with firmware version 3.90. It allowed the Go!Cam to be used for video conferencing and voice chat. PSP users could communicate with PC users through Go!Messenger if the PC was running BT Softphone 2. Because use of the service did not meet Sony and BT's expectations, it was discontinued on March 31, 2009. Subsequently, firmware version 5.50 removed the program's icon.

SensMe channels for music files was added to the PSP starting with firmware version 6.10. Also, SHOUTCast Radio can be listened to via an inbuilt app on most PSPs.

In Japanese market PSP systems, the application x-Radar Portable was preloaded starting with firmware version 6.35 in January 2010. A port of a map software for PCs and mobile phones developed by PetaMap, x-Radar Portable finds the location of the PSP on a map and obtains information of places near the user. It determines the location through "PlaceEngine" technology, via wireless LAN signals.

== Custom firmware ==
Homebrew development was very popular during the time of the PlayStation Portable. Besides the official firmware (OFW) made by Sony, custom firmware (also written as Custom Firmware, or simply CFW) is also commonly seen in the PlayStation Portable handheld consoles.

Custom firmware allows the running of unsigned code such as homebrew applications, UMD .ISO files, emulators for other consoles and PS1 games when the disc images are converted into an EBOOT file. This is in stark contrast to the official system software, where only code that has been signed by Sony can run.

Notable custom firmware versions include the M33 Custom Firmware by Dark_AleX as well as those made by others such as the Custom Firmware 5.50GEN series, Minimum Edition (ME/LME) CFW and the PRO CFW.

All legally and illegally obtained content can be played on custom firmware, assuming that it is at the latest version (currently 6.61). During the early days of the PSP hacking scene, it was discovered that firmware 1.00 allowed unsigned code to run. While this firmware only existed on PSP-1000 models from Japan, many users imported these models to run and develop homebrew. An exploit was later discovered in firmware 1.50 that also allowed unsigned code to run. This opened up North American PSP-1000 systems for homebrew. Firmware 1.5 acted as the standard firmware for homebrew until the creation of eLoaders (which use various exploits to launch a homebrew "menu"), savegame exploits in games such as Grand Theft Auto: Liberty City Stories and Lumines: Puzzle Fusion and eventually DarkAlex's custom firmware releases, which all allowed PSPs shipped after the 1.51 update's release to run homebrew.

Sony had put significant effort into blocking custom firmware and other third party devices/content from the PSP, but their effort was in vain. In July 2007 Dark_AleX officially stopped his work on the PSP, citing perceived problems with Sony as one of the reasons for his departure, but other custom firmware versions continue to be developed or updated. In 2015, a homebrew tool known as Infinity was developed which allows users to permanently install CFW such as LME or PRO on all PSP models. This tool requires firmware 6.60 or 6.61.

== See also ==
- Media Go
- XrossMediaBar
- LocationFree Player
- PlayStation Network

Other gaming platforms from Sony:

- PlayStation 4 system software
- PlayStation 3 system software
- PlayStation Vita system software

Other gaming platforms from the next generation:

- Nintendo 3DS system software
- Wii U system software
- Xbox One system software
- Nintendo Switch system software

Other gaming platforms from this generation:

- Nintendo DSi system software
- Wii system software
- Xbox 360 system software
