= Cosm (software) =

Family of open distributed computing software and protocols

- Original author(s): Adam Beberg
- Developer(s): Mithral Inc.
- Initial release: 1995
- Written in: C
- Operating system: Microsoft Windows, Mac OS X, Unix-like
- Available in: English
- Type: Distributed computing
- License: Apache License 2.0
- Website: www.mithral.com/cosm/

Cosm is a family of open distributed computing software and protocols developed in 1995 led by Adam L. Beberg, and later developed by Mithral Inc. Cosm is a registered trademark of Mithral Inc.

Early work on Cosm lead to Beberg co-founding distributed.net, which was used for cryptographic and mathematical challenges beginning in 1997. Beberg left the governing group of distributed.net in April 1999 to work on Cosm full-time.

The Cosm Client-Server Software Development Kit (CS-SDK) for building volunteer computing projects, along with experience in gathering volunteers gained from distributed.net, was used as the initial software framework for the Genome@home and Folding@home projects at Stanford University. The project grew to over 400,000 simultaneous machines achieving 8 PFLOPS, aiding in protein folding research. The Cosm CS-SDK was also used for the first several years of the eOn project.

Beberg worked towards a Doctorate degree at Stanford from 2004 through 2011, using Cosm for his research.

== See also ==
- List of volunteer computing projects
- distributed.net
- Genome@home
- Folding@home
- Storage@home
