= PlayStation Vita system software =

System software for the PlayStation Vita

- LiveArea, the user interface of the PlayStation Vita
- Developer: Sony Interactive Entertainment
- Written in: C, assembly language
- OS family: Proprietary OS (containing components which are based FreeBSD and NetBSD)
- Working state: Discontinued
- Source model: Closed source
- Initial release: December 17, 2011; 14 years ago (as 1.03)
- Latest release: 3.74 / May 10, 2022; 4 years ago
- Available in: Chinese (Simplified), Chinese (Traditional), Danish, Dutch, English (United Kingdom), English (United States), Finnish, French, German, Italian, Japanese, Korean, Norwegian, Polish, Portuguese (Brazil), Portuguese (Portugal), Russian, Spanish, Swedish, Turkish
- Update method: Direct Download; Download via PS3; Download via PC; Game Card; USB drive (PS TV only)
- Supported platforms: PlayStation Vita and PlayStation TV
- Kernel type: Monolithic
- Default user interface: LiveArea
- Preceded by: PlayStation Portable (system software)
- Official website: USA; EU; Japan

The PlayStation Vita system software is the official firmware and operating system for the PlayStation Vita and PlayStation TV video game consoles. It uses the LiveArea as its graphical shell. The system is built on a custom kernel with some components derived from FreeBSD and NetBSD.

== User interface ==
The LiveArea is the name of the graphical user interface of the PlayStation Vita system software developed by Sony Computer Entertainment. The interface features a new touch-based screen and acts like a hub page and allows users to switch between different parts of the game space. The eighth-generation PlayStation Vita and PlayStation TV consoles use LiveArea as the graphical shell instead of the previous XrossMediaBar (XMB) interface, which was used by Sony's seventh-generation video game consoles such as PlayStation Portable and PlayStation 3. The PlayStation 4, Sony's eighth-generation home video game console however uses neither LiveArea nor XrossMediaBar as its graphical shell, but rather utilizes a user interface called PlayStation Dynamic Menu.

The LiveArea user interface includes various social networking features via the PlayStation Network (PSN). Users can select the icon for a game or an application on the home screen to open the LiveArea screen for that game or application in PlayStation Vita or PlayStation TV. As a new feature of PlayStation Vita and PlayStation TV's LiveArea, latest game information such as downloadable contents are shown on the LiveArea screen for that game. In addition, by scrolling down the game's LiveArea, the "Activity" of other users who are playing the same game can be checked instantly.

=== Cooperation with home consoles ===
The PlayStation Vita and the PlayStation TV support a feature called Remote Play with the PlayStation 3 and the PlayStation 4. It allows the PlayStation 3 or PlayStation 4 to transmit its video and audio output to a PlayStation Vita or PlayStation TV. While Remote Play between the PlayStation Vita and the PlayStation 4 is well-integrated, Remote Play between the PlayStation Vita and the PlayStation 3 is only supported by a "select" few PS3 titles and results were often laggy. In a similar vein, the PlayStation Vita can be used as a second screen device for the PS4 (and for PS3, but only supported by very few games such as Class of Heroes 2G) for streaming content directly from the console to the PlayStation Vita.

Also, for users who own both the PlayStation Vita and the PlayStation 3, it is possible to share media files videos, music and images between them by transferring multimedia files directly from the PlayStation Vita to the PlayStation 3, or vice versa. Updates for the PlayStation Vita system software can also be downloaded to PS Vita devices via a PS3 system. Furthermore, a service called Cross-Buy can be used which allows players to buy certain games that support this feature one time, and play them in both Sony platforms. Minecraft and Terraria are examples of such games, and their saved worlds are transferable between the consoles. Minecraft is no longer cross buy as of February 25, 2016.

There is also a feature called Cross-Play (or Cross-Platform Play) covering any PlayStation Vita software title that can interact with a PlayStation 3 or a PlayStation 4 software title. Different software titles use Cross-Play in different ways. For example, Ultimate Marvel vs. Capcom 3 is a title supporting the Cross-Play feature, and the PS3 version of the game can be controlled using the PS Vita system.

== Internet features ==
With an Internet connection, the PlayStation Vita system allows users to access a variety of PSN services such as the PlayStation Store and the PlayStation Plus subscription service, and games and other content may be purchased from these services. Applications such as the Live from PlayStation app, as well as various video streaming apps, also require an Internet connection to function properly.

The "Browser" is a preinstalled app on the PlayStation Vita for browsing the World Wide Web. Although not very different from web browsing on a PlayStation Portable, the browser itself has been improved over the PSP's version, which is intended to result in a less difficult experience. The browser application does not have tabs, but users can have up to 8 separate browser windows open at once, and can also save images from websites to the PS Vita memory card by touching and holding on the image until a menu appears. However, while users can use the web browser while playing a game or watching a video, the display of some content will be limited; as a result, it is recommended to exit any open game or video before performing more intensive browsing tasks. Furthermore, while the PS Vita's web browser supports HTML5, cookies and JavaScript, it does not support Adobe Flash, unlike the PSP's web browser.

Another application preinstalled on the PlayStation Vita at launch was "Maps", which displayed online maps when an Internet connection was available. However, it was removed by Sony via a system update in 2015, along with a feature in the "near" application that shared the technology used by Maps.

== Multimedia features ==
Like many other game consoles, the PlayStation Vita is capable of photo, audio, and video playback in a variety of formats, and the built-in cameras can be used to take photos or videos. However, unlike the PlayStation 3 and the PlayStation 4, it is not possible to play Blu-ray or DVD movies on the PlayStation Vita since it lacks an optical disc drive, or a UMD drive as with the PlayStation Portable. However, users can transfer movies in a supported format from and to a PlayStation Vita system, and there are videos for download at the PlayStation Store. Also, users can transfer content that is playing or displayed on a PlayStation Vita system to a PlayStation TV system, allowing them to view the content on their televisions instead of PS Vita screens. The following multimedia formats are supported on a PS Vita or a PS TV system:

- Videos: MP4 SP, MP4 AVC / MP4 H.264 Baseline, Main, or High Profile Level 4.1
- Photos: JPEG, GIF, TIFF, BMP, PNG
- Music: MP3, MP3 Surround, WAV, WMA 9, MP4 Audio, MPEG-4 Part 3, AAC / AAC Low Complexity (unprotected)

== List of apps ==
- AR Play
  - Table Soccer
  - Cliff Diving
  - Fireworks
- Crackle
- Crunchyroll
- Colors!
- Camera
- Chat
- Group Messaging
- Hulu
- Internet Browser
- Imaginstruments
- Facebook
- Frobisher Says
- Flickr
- Foursquare
- Friends
- LiveTweet
- Music
- Maps
- Niconico
- NHL GameCentre Live
- NBA Game Time
- Netflix
- Near
- Paint Park
- Paint Park Plus
- Party
- PS Home Arcade
- PlayStation Store
- Photos & Camera
- Qello
- Remote Play
- Redbox Instant
- Skype
- Treasure Park
- Trophies
- T@g
- Twitch
- TuneIn Radio
- Videos
- Wake-Up Club
- Welcome Park
- YouTube
