= EBOOT =

EBOOT may refer to:

- PlayStation Portable homebrew
- EBOOT bootloader of Windows CE
