= Life with PlayStation =

Online multimedia application for the PlayStation 3

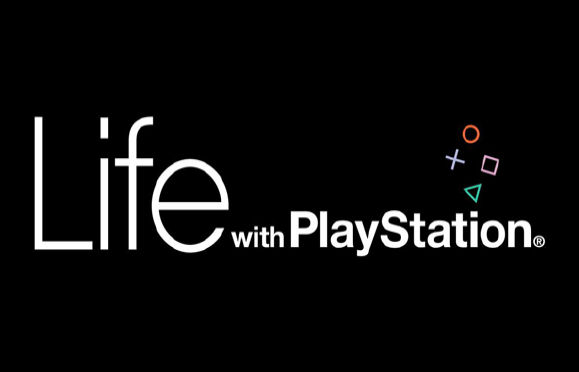
- Developer: Life with PlayStation; Sony Computer Entertainment; Folding@Home Channel; Sony Computer Entertainment of America; Stanford University / Pande Group
- Type: Virtual globe Virtual encyclopedia News client Distributed computing
- Launched: September 18, 2008
- Platform: PlayStation 3
- Status: Discontinued

Life with PlayStation was an online multimedia application for the PlayStation 3 video game console on the PlayStation Network. The application had four channels, all of which revolved around a virtual globe that displayed information according to the channel. The application also included a client for Folding@home, a distributed computing project aimed at disease research. As of November 2012 the service has been discontinued.

== History ==
In August 2006, Stanford University in Silicon Valley, announced that a protein folding client would be available to run on the PS3.

On December 19, 2007, Sony updated the Folding@home client to version 1.3. The update allowed users to run music stored on their hard drives while contributing to Folding@home and automatically shut down their console after existing simulation work was done. The software update also added the Generalized Born implicit solvent model, which broadened the PS3 client's computing capabilities.

On September 18, 2008 the PS3 version of the Folding@home client became Life With PlayStation. The application became available for the PS3 in March 2007 and became a channel on Life with PlayStation when it was released. This update also provided more advanced simulation of protein folding and a new ranking system.

Following the release of system software version 4.30, the Folding@home PS3 client and all other services under Life with PlayStation were discontinued on November 6, 2012. Life with PlayStation was then removed from the XrossMediaBar for new users.

== Channels ==
The "Live Channel" showing weather forecasts and news headlines for New York City. Screenshot taken at approximately 8pm PST.

Life with PlayStation featured five channels which were updated frequently with new information. The application provided the user with access to information "channels", the first of which was the Live Channel which offered news headlines and weather through a 3D globe. The user could rotate and zoom into any part of the world to access information provided by Google News and The Weather Channel, among other sources.

=== Live Channel ===
Live Channel was a news, time zone and weather feed, which provided users with information from Google News and The Weather Channel organized by city. The content included live camera feeds and cloud data, similar to Google Earth. Live Cameras was provided by earthTV and the Webcams.travel website. The application only supported certain cities of the world, with limited coverage, such as with the continent Africa, with only four cities covered by the Live Channel.

=== Folding@Home ===
The PlayStation 3's Life With PlayStation client displayed a 3-D animation of the protein being folded.

Life with PlayStation also hosted an application for Folding@home, a distributed computing project for disease research that simulated protein folding and other molecular dynamics. Users were able to contribute to the project by leaving their client to run Folding@home while not playing games. The application displayed a live rendering of the protein being folded and some statistical information in front of a virtual globe background.

=== PlayStation Network Game Trailers Channel ===
For users in the United States, the PSN game trailers channel allowed direct access to the streaming of the PlayStation Store's game trailers. It also allowed the ability to purchase titles from the store, without having to leave the application.

=== United Village ===
United Village, provided by its respective website, and hosted by Frontier International Inc., was a cultural documentary-like project that gathered stories, interviews and articles worldwide. It targeted rural stories from largely from developing countries with some rural parts of other countries. The contents of the channel include culture, development, education, social issues and tourism. The United Village channel was discontinued on March 30, 2011.

=== World Heritage ===
World Heritage, by α Clock, showed UNESCO-selected locations of special cultural or physical significance around the world. These World Heritage sites linked to their respective articles on Wikipedia. Each location included the introduction directly from the Wikipedia articles.

== Features ==
In addition to the channels, the PlayStation 3's also featured photo slideshow viewing, music & video playback. Also Life with PlayStation had a virtual globe that was periodically updated from servers to ensure that cloud, weather, live camera feed and news update data were all up to date. All channels except for the Live Channel included a static representation of our planet Earth, while the Live Channel itself showed day and night time effects. Additionally, the Folding@home protein folding could be disabled.
