= Adaptive sampling =

Adaptive sampling is a family of sampling strategies in which the procedure for selecting the sample may depend on values observed earlier in the process. In a conventional design, the whole sample is fixed before data collection begins. An adaptive design uses gathered information to decide where to sample next, for example around sites where a rare species has been found, or in regions where a function changes rapidly. Because each observation has a cost, whether in field time, laboratory work or computation, concentrating effort where it is most informative can give more precise estimates or more accurate models for the same budget.

Adaptive sampling is used in several fields. In survey statistics, adaptive cluster sampling is used to survey rare, clustered populations, particularly in ecology and environmental science. Other uses include the sequential design of computer experiments for surrogate models, adaptive importance sampling in Monte Carlo methods, environmental monitoring with autonomous underwater vehicles and other mobile robots, and molecular dynamics simulations of protein folding.

Let f(x) be a function that is to be sampled. For simplicity, let C(x,s) be the cost for sample x given the previous set of samples s (For simplicity, we can assume that C(x,s) is constant since sampling cost usually does not depend on the previous samples and the sampling input x to the function. In time-critical systems, where the cost for each sample is strongly related to computation time; usually there are other parameters to the function C like the current time...); and G(x, s) be the gain (anti-cost) from sampling the function at x, given the set of previous samples s. For example, it can be assumed that G(x, s)=0 if x has already been sampled. The sampling problem is then maximizing our cumulative gain minus cumulative cost. Which usually comes down to sampling the function n times until the next sample's estimated/deterministic cost C(x,s) is larger than the gain G(x,s) of that sample.

Adaptive sampling then assumes that given necessary knowledge about the problem, there is a theoretically optimal sequence s of samples that will maximize the information (gain) induced by that sample; and it is possible to estimate s using heuristics. Adaptive sampling usually focuses on estimating the next optimal sample input x, given the previous set of samples. Thus, being adaptive to the current knowledge about the function.

== Molecular dynamics ==
In molecular dynamics (MD) simulations of biomolecules, events of interest such as a protein folding or a drug binding to its target are rare. The molecule spends most of its time fluctuating around a few relatively stable shapes, known as metastable states, and switches between them only occasionally. A single simulation can therefore run for a long time without capturing the event of interest.

Adaptive sampling, sometimes called adaptive seeding in this context, replaces one long trajectory with many short simulations run in parallel, in rounds. After each round, the sampled conformations are grouped into states, and the next round is started from states chosen by a selection rule. Some rules favour the least-visited states, which pushes exploration outward. Others balance exploration against progress towards a target property, and some use machine learning to choose restart points. Because each simulation follows the system's unbiased dynamics, the data can be combined into a kinetic model, most often a Markov state model. This distinguishes adaptive sampling from methods such as metadynamics, which add a bias potential to the system's energy. The approach is used by the Folding@home distributed computing project.

Its effectiveness depends on the selection rule, and no single rule is best for every goal. A 2019 study of protein–ligand binding found that typical methods did not reach the bound pose faster than conventional long simulations, although they did locate possible binding sites more efficiently.

=== See also ===
- Folding@home
- Hidden Markov model
- Computational biology
- Molecular biology
