= Room for PlayStation Portable =

Cancelled social networking service developed for the PlayStation Portable

- Developer: Sony Computer Entertainment Japan
- Type: Online community service Virtual world
- Launched: Q4 2009 (closed beta)
- Discontinued: April 15, 2010
- Platform: PlayStation Portable
- Website: (in Japanese) (archived)

Room for PlayStation Portable (stylized as R∞M or PlayStation Room) was a community-based social networking service that halted development on April 15, 2010. It was being developed by Sony Computer Entertainment Japan and beta tested in Japan, from October 2009 to April 2010 for the PlayStation Portable on the PlayStation Network. The service was similar to the PlayStation 3's service, PlayStation Home.

Room was first announced at TGS 2009. It could be launched directly from the PlayStation Network section of the PSP's XrossMediaBar after it had been downloaded and installed onto the PSP system. Just as with Home, PSP owners would have been able to invite other PSP owners into their Simulated rooms (called "my rooms") to "enjoy real time communication." The service would have been free, with additional premium content available at launch. It was to be available for all models of the PSP; Sony announced that it would allow users to create 3-D avatars, room spaces, blogs, albums, and chat support.

A screenshot of Room.

A closed beta test was conducted from October 2009 up to April 15, 2010, with selected PSP owners receiving an invitation to participate, and further details. PSP owners in Japan were able to sign up from September 24 to October 5, 2009, on the Japanese website, requiring access to the internet from their PSP, age of 18 years or more, and a PlayStation Network master account.

Development of the service was halted on April 15, 2010, in light of the feedback from the participants, with SCE Japan thanking them for their feedback.

== See also ==
- Avatars Xbox 360 Avatars | Wii Miis
- Avatar worlds PlayStation Home | Second Life | Free Realms | IMVU | OLIVE | Active Worlds
