= XrossMediaBar =

Interface used on the PlayStation 3 and other Sony products

The PS3's XMB interface

A logo featured on devices with the XrossMediaBar

The XrossMediaBar (pronounced "cross-media bar" and officially abbreviated as XMB) is a graphical user interface developed by Sony Computer Entertainment. The interface features icons that are spread horizontally across the screen. Navigation moves the icons, instead of a cursor. These icons are used as categories to organize the options available to the user. When an icon is selected on the horizontal bar, several more appear vertically, above and below it. They, in turn, are selectable by the up and down directions on a directional pad.

Originally used on the PSX (a PlayStation 2 with an integrated digital video recorder), the XMB is used as the default interface on both the PlayStation Portable and PlayStation 3. Since 2004, it has also been used in high-end WEGA TVs, the Bravia starting with the 3000 (only in S-series and above), the Sony XEL-1 OLED TV, HDTV set-top boxes, Blu-ray players, some Sony Ericsson phones and high-end AV receivers. The Sony Ericsson K850, W595, W760, W910 and Aino feature a version of the XMB as their entertainment menu. The XMB was also the menu system in the 2007 generation of Sony's Bravia TVs. Sony also added the XMB to its Vaio laptops.

The interface won the Technology & Engineering Emmy Award for "Outstanding Innovation and Achievement in Advanced Media Technology for the Best Use of Personal Media Display and Presentation Technology" in 2006.

The XMB has been phased out starting with the PlayStation Vita, which adopted a new touch-based user interface called LiveArea. On February 20, 2013, the PlayStation 4 was announced, and a new, non-XMB, user interface was shown. Sony Bravia smart televisions continued to use it until 2014, when both an unnamed interface with Smart TV functionality and Android TV were phased in.

== Examples on Sony devices ==
=== PlayStation Portable ===
From left to right, the categories are these: Settings, Extras, Photo, Music, Video, TV (Only available in countries that use the 1seg broadcasting service), Game, Network, and PlayStation Network. Once a category is selected, its options appear below the icon, selectable by pressing the button (for European and North American version), or button (Asian versions only). Going back is possible by pressing the left directional button or the button (for European and North American version), or button (Asian versions only). Some items have an option menu that can be displayed by pressing the button. The XMB is capable of limited multitasking. This is accessed by pushing the "Home" button on the PSP-1000 and PSP-2000 and the "PS" button on the PSP-3000 and PSPgo while listening to music, looking at photos, etc. This feature can be used to watch a video, look at a photo, listen to music, and look at the current web page, all while browsing the XMB. However, what is in the background will be cancelled if any item is accessed on the XMB (except if viewing pictures while listening to music). The background color on the XMB changes color depending on the current month. On a PSP with firmware 2.00+, the background color can be changed or the background can be changed to a picture. On a PSP with firmware 3.70+, it is possible to listen to music and view photos simultaneously. On the PSP-2000, PSP-3000, and PSPgo models, there are a number of additional colors available for the XMB. On a PSP with at least system software 4.20, the background "waves" effect has changed, with two options under theme, then color. These two options are the ability to change between the new "waves" effect and the classic "wavy lines". On update 5.00, the XMB received the PlayStation Store as a new feature.

==== Themes for the PlayStation Portable ====
Users with system software version 3.70 or newer for the PlayStation Portable have the ability to download themes and apply them to their system's XrossMediaBar without using custom firmware. Subsequently, Sony released software which allows users to create their own themes for the PlayStation Portable.

=== PlayStation 3 ===
The PlayStation 3 version of the XrossMediaBar includes ten categories of options: Users, Settings, Photo, Music, Video, TV/Video Services, Game, Network, PlayStation Network, and Friends. The dynamic lines on the background are more condensed into a 'ribbon' rather than the PSP's large waves, unselected icons shrink slightly and every selectable background color has been made a shade darker. The PS3 includes the following particular abilities: to store various master and secondary user profiles; to manage and explore photos with Photo Gallery or an ordinary musical/non-musical slideshow; to rip audio CDs, rip iTunes AAC protected files, to copy tracks to an attached storage device; and to play music, movies and video files from the hard disk drive, from an optional USB mass storage or Flash card, or from an optical disc (Blu-ray Disc or DVD-Video). It also has compatibility for a USB keyboard and mouse and a full web browser supporting downloading of multiple file types. The Friends menu allows email with emoticons and attached picture features and video chat which requires an optional webcam (although the PlayStation Eye and the EyeToy are official webcams, most USB webcams will work). The PlayStation Network menu allows online shopping through the PlayStation Store.

Also, the PlayStation 3 adds the ability to multitask in ways such as listening to stored audio files while surfing the web or looking at pictures. The PlayStation 3 XMB supports a variety of file formats (see PlayStation 3 System Software). The PS3 reserves 48 MB of RAM at all times for XMB functions.

==== In-game XMB menu ====
Sony Computer Entertainment America (SCEA) and many other sources state that in-game XMB was the single most requested feature for the PS3 in 2007. In-game XMB functionality was debuted before the launch of the PS3 by SCEI but was omitted due to technical reasons from the official launch. The feature was added to the PlayStation 3 on July 2, 2008, via system update 2.40. However, roughly eleven hours after its release, download of the system update was disabled amidst isolated reports of problems reported by small groups of users since installing the update. Users who had not already downloaded the update were only able to download the previous version, 2.36. On July 8, 2008, System Software version 2.41 was released for the PlayStation 3 which restored the in-game XMB functionality of version 2.40 and addressed the problems Sony had found in 2.40. All of these issues were addressed in the 2.40 system update. Although the ability to play users' own music in-game was added with this update, the feature is dependent on game developers who must enable the feature in their games, perhaps by updating existing games.

Prior to the update, basic forms of XMB friends lists could be found in some modern (August 2007 or newer) PS3 games including; Resistance: Fall of Man (Since the 1.1 patch), Warhawk, Rock Band, Call of Duty 4: Modern Warfare, Kane & Lynch, Burnout Paradise (also includes in-game XMB headset accessory menu). In addition, custom soundtracks, taking on the user interface of the XMB has been implemented into a few games such as Mainichi Issho, Super Stardust HD, Burnout Paradise (ver 1.3), MLB 08: The Show, Wipeout HD, Ghostbusters, High Velocity Bowling, Pain, The Beatles: Rock Band, and software such as Folding@home (1.2). These partial functions of XMB (friends lists and custom soundtracks) have been reserved for the developer to implement.

On PlayStation Now, a former cloud gaming subscription service, a similar in-game XMB can be accessed, but the number of categories was decreased to three (Game, PlayStation Network and Friends) and not all of the XMB's features are present. This could only be accessed when playing a PS3 game on PS Now.

==== XMB color schemes ====
The XMB's default background color changes depending on the current month of the year, and it changes brightness depending on the time of day. Major color changes occur on the three days before the 15th and 24th of each month, while the color gradually changes between those dates.

Colors during the year (At noon, full brightness)
Date	Jan 15	Jan 24	Feb 15	Feb 24	Mar 15	Mar 24	Apr 15	Apr 24	May 15	May 24	Jun 15	Jun 24	Jul 15	Jul 24	Aug 15	Aug 24	Sep 15	Sep 24	Oct 15	Oct 24	Nov 15	Nov 24	Dec 15	Dec 24
Color																								

Brightness changes during the day (24 hour)
Time	00	01	02	03	04	05	06	07	08	09	10	11	12	13	14	15	16	17	18	19	20	21	22	23
Value																								

System software version 1.90, released July 23, 2007, allows users to change the background of the XMB to display any image saved on the console's hard disk drive. Firmware 2.00 added the ability to select the background color of the XMB (from the same choice as the PSP), and the brightness of the XMB background. The same update also added extra font choices, and the ability to use custom themes that change the icons, wallpaper, color, font, and, in some cases, the sound effects. With the release of firmware 3.00, a 'sparkle' effect has been added to the XMB background (there is a "Classic" theme that doesn't have the 'sparkle' effect), and the black theme color has been replaced with a grey theme color, among other revisions.

==== Themes ====
Themes can be created by Sony's official PlayStation 3 theme creator software or by theme compilers from third-party developers. PlayStation 3 themes are able to store images and sounds in order for users to customize their system's XMB. Themes can be shared via the internet and can be downloaded directly to the PS3 system via the PS3's web browser.

Sony Computer Entertainment also makes official themes available through the PlayStation Store, a service which is part of the PlayStation Network. A Dynamic Themes feature was added in software version 3.00 which allows the user to use animated themes. These themes may feature animated backgrounds which change throughout the day or respond to user input.

==== Developer ====
Q-Games Ltd, a small development company based in Kyoto, Japan, developed the graphics technology behind the XMB, its stylized background, and the built-in music visualizers. Sony has also collaborated with Stanford University to bring the Folding@home project to the PS3. Once downloaded, the program can be configured to run when the system is idle or executed manually from the XMB. Folding@home was later integrated into Life with PlayStation, which has been discontinued on November 6, 2012.

=== Bravia ===
On the Sony Bravia TVs that have the XMB, the XrossMediaBar includes seven categories of options. The Bravia XMB menu works similarly to the in-game XMB menu on the PS3, except with the "Home" button instead. Therefore, it lacks a background and is not Bravia's start up menu. Like the PSP and PS3, it has the ability to perform system updates and access the user's music and video on the TV. Unique to the Bravia XMB however, is the ability to view digital channel information just by scrolling through the items on the menu. Although inputs can be instantly selected through the TV, XMB also handles the devices plugged into the TV along with the TV channels. Analogue channels, unlike digital channels, do not display channel information on the XMB.

== Control ==
Generally, the XMB requires 8 different options on a controller. A 4-way directional pad (D-pad) is used to choose categories (using the left and right directions) as well as highlighting options or actions within these categories (using the up and down directions). Two additional buttons are required to select items which are highlighted, as well as to return to the previous "level" of menus (usually and) although usually pressing the left directional button will bring the XMB back to the previous menu and using the Start button will start software. Another button is required to display an option menu on a certain item (usually). Some items might not have an option menu. Additionally, is used to group files on the XMB.

The XMB can also be controlled with the BRAVIA TV remote control (on both BRAVIA TVs and PS3 Slim models) and with the PlayStation Move motion controller by waving the Move around left to right as well as up and down. The controls have been cited as being similar to the film Minority Report.

== See also ==
- Wii Menu
- Xbox 360 system software/NXE
- LiveArea
