= Genome@home =

Defunct volunteer computing project

Genome@home was a volunteer computing project run by Stefan Larson of Stanford University, and a sister project to Folding@home. Its goal was protein design and its applications, which had implications in many fields including medicine. Genome@home was run by the Pande Lab.

== Function ==
Following the Human Genome Project, scientists needed to know the biological and medical implications of the resulting wealth of genetic information. Genome@home used spare processing power on personal computers to virtually design genes that match existing proteins, although it can also design new proteins that have not been found in nature. This process is computationally demanding, so distributed computing is a viable option. Researchers can use the results from the project to gain a better understanding of the evolution of natural genomes and proteins, and their functionality. This project had applications in medical therapy, new pharmaceuticals, and assigning functions to newly sequenced genes.

Genome@home directly studied genomes and proteins by virtually designing new sequences for existing 3-D protein structures, which other scientists obtained through X-ray crystallography or NMR techniques. By understanding the relationship between the sequences and specific protein structures, the Pande lab tackled contemporary issues in structural biology, genetics, and medicine.

Specifically, the Genome@home project aided the understanding of why thousands of different amino acid sequences all form the same structures and assisted the fields of proteomics and structural genomics by predicting the functions of newly discovered genes and proteins. It also had implications in medical therapy by designing and virtually creating new versions of existing proteins. Genome@home's software was designed for uniprocessor systems. It begins with a large set of potential sequences, and repeatedly searches through and refines these sequences until a well-designed sequence is found. It then sends this sequence to the server, and repeats the process.

== Conclusion ==
For financial reasons, the project was officially concluded on March 8, 2004, although data was still collected until April 15. Following its completion, users were asked to donate to Folding@home instead.

== Results ==
It accumulated a large database of protein sequences, which will be used for important scientific purposes for years by the Pande Lab and other scientists across the world.

Four peer-reviewed scientific publications have resulted from Genome@home.

== See also ==
- List of volunteer computing projects
