= Universal Media Disc =

Optical disc medium for PlayStation Portable

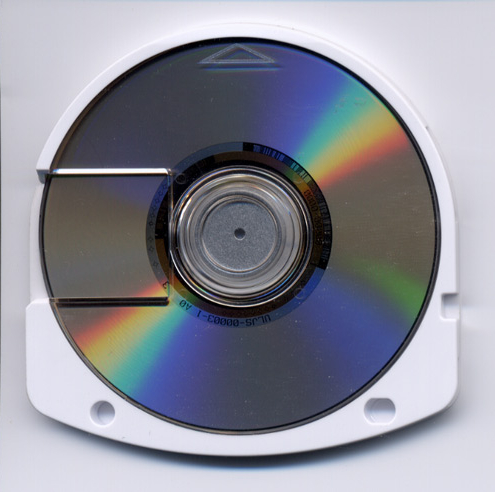
- Media type: Optical disc
- Capacity: 900 MB (single layer), 1.8 GB (dual layer)
- Read mechanism: 660 nm laser diode
- Developed by: Sony
- Usage: Games, movies, music
- Released: December 12, 2004; 21 years ago
- Discontinued: 2017

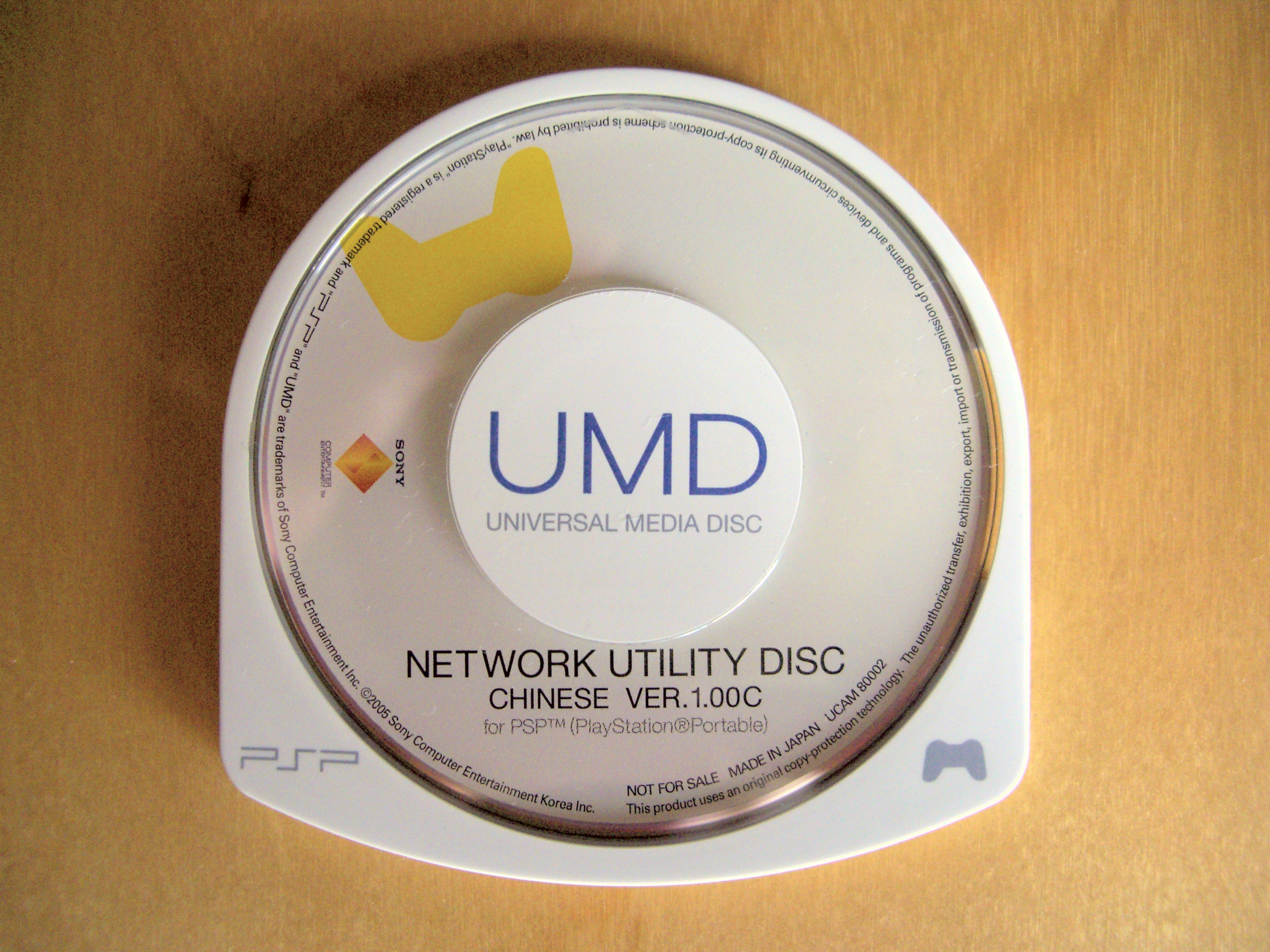
UMD disc front

The Universal Media Disc (UMD) is a discontinued optical disc medium developed by Sony for use on its PlayStation Portable handheld gaming and multimedia platform. It can hold up to 1.8 gigabytes of data and is capable of storing video games, feature-length films, and music.

== Video storage format ==
While the primary application for UMD discs is as a storage medium for PSP games, the format is also used for the storage of motion pictures and, to a lesser degree, television shows for playback on the PSP. The video is encoded in the H.264/MPEG-4 AVC format, with the audio in ATRAC3plus or PCM. Video stored on UMD is typically encoded in 720×480 resolution, but is scaled down when displayed on the PSP. There are around 1,500 films released on UMD (around 1,000 are common for all regions and around 500 are region exclusives). The American punk rock band The Offspring released their Complete Music Video Collection on the format. The BBC released a number of its programmes on UMD in the UK, including The Office, The Mighty Boosh, Doctor Who, and Little Britain. WWE also released some wrestler highlights and documentary content on UMD format, such as the Monday Night War, Jake "The Snake" Roberts: Pick Your Poison, and WWE Raw Homecoming (a special episode of WWE Raw celebrating the return to USA Network); the only WWE pay-per-view released on UMD format was WrestleMania XXIV.

Tupac's performance, Live at the House of Blues, was also released on the UMD, which also included several music videos, including Hit 'Em Up.

Some adult films have been released on UMD in Japan. Sony reportedly took offence at adult film studios publishing pornography on the medium, but claimed that they were unable to restrict films on UMD as with games and other software for the PSP.

== Specifications ==
ECMA-365: Data Interchange on 60 mm Read-Only ODC – Capacity: 1.8 GB (UMD)

- Dimensions: approx. 64 mm (diameter) × 4.2 mm (thickness)
- Maximum capacity: 1.80 GB (dual layer), 900 MB (single-layer)
- Laser wavelength: 660 nm (red laser)
- Numerical aperture: 0.64
- Track pitch: 0.70 μm
- Minimum pit length: 0.1384 μm
- Modulation: 8-to-16 RLL(2,10)
- Encryption: AES 128-bit

The case dimensions for UMD discs are 177×104×14mm.

=== Provisions ===
According to the official ECMA specification Sony designed the UMD to support two possible future enhancements and products.

1. Protective Shutter: Similar to the MiniDisc and 3 1/2-inch floppy disk, this protective shutter would shield the inner disc from accidental contact.
2. Auto-Loading: UMDs were designed for possible future slot loading devices with Auto-Loading mechanisms.

=== Region coding ===
DVD region coding has been applied to most UMD movies and music. However, all PSP games are region-free, although some require pay-to-continue.

- Region ALL: Worldwide (region-free)
- Region 1: North America, Central America, Latin America
- Region 2: Europe (without Russia or Belarus), Japan, Middle East, South Africa, Greenland
- Region 3: Southeast Asia, Taiwan, South Korea, Hong Kong
- Region 4: Oceania, South America
- Region 5: Russia, Ukraine, Belarus, India, Pakistan, Africa (without Egypt or South Africa), North Korea, Mongolia
- Region 6: China

== Availability and support ==
The UMD offered a capacity of around 900mb to 1.8gb, and the capability to store audio/standard-definition video content; however, the format's proprietary nature, and lack of both writers and accompanying blank media made adoption difficult. The UMD format never saw implementation on any device other than the PlayStation Portable (PSP), and as a result the market was very limited compared to those of other optical media formats. The lack of a target demographic for and the high price of UMD movie releases were another contributing factor. They were often more expensive than DVDs, but lacked extra content.

The first 5 months of the PSP's March 2005 launch saw strong UMD production. There were reportedly 239 total titles in or on their way to the consumer market and 2 Sony Pictures titles selling over 100,000 units within 2 months. After the Summer came a decline in sales followed by Apple announcing the Fifth Generation iPod (aka: iPod Video) -- a portable media player with video capabilities -- in October along with music videos and popular TV series (e.g.: Desperate Housewives) becoming available on the iTunes Store. Poor sales of UMD movies early in the format's life played a direct hand in major studios like Universal and Paramount rescinding their support while others like 20th Century Fox and Buena Vista cut back heavily on their release schedules. Retail support of the format experienced similar troubles. In 2006, Wal-Mart reportedly began phasing out shelf space devoted to UMD movies at a store in Santa Ana, California. A year after announcing in 2007 that it would discontinue supporting movie releases on UMD, Sony lowered their price tags to as low as $10-15.

In late 2009, Sony began pushing developers away from the UMD format and towards digital distribution on the PlayStation Network. Likely in preparation for the launch of the digital-download-only PSP Go (aka: PSPgo), which was the first (and only) PSP model to not include a UMD drive. However, the system experienced lackluster sales compared to previous models, with most consumers still choosing the UMD-compatible PSP-3000 model, which continued to be sold alongside the PSP Go. Despite the earlier push for PlayStation Network releases around the PSP Go's launch, over half of the PSP's library was only made available in UMD format including Crisis Core: Final Fantasy VII and Kingdom Hearts Birth by Sleep, as well as the US releases of Final Fantasy and Final Fantasy II. There have been a few PlayStation Network exclusive releases since the PSP Go's launch, such as LocoRoco Midnight Carnival and the international release of Final Fantasy III. Still, most new games continued to be distributed via UMD, and, aside from those published by SCE, not all have been released on PlayStation Network.

The successor of the PlayStation Portable, the PlayStation Vita, did not include UMD support, nor was it added throughout its lifespan. In a move similar to the PSP Go, Sony focused on digital downloads and opted for low-profile flash-based cartridges as the system's main media format. UMD releases of films ended in 2011. Games were published on UMD up until 2013. Production of UMDs ended when the last Japanese factory producing them closed in late 2016.

UMD can be dumped into disc image files (.iso or .cso), using a modified PSP. This file can be loaded by a modified PSP through the Memory Stick, similar to titles that were distributed through the PlayStation Network.

== See also ==
- List of optical disc manufacturers
- MiniDisc—a similar Sony format
