= PlayStation Portable homebrew =

Executing unsigned code on PlayStation Portable

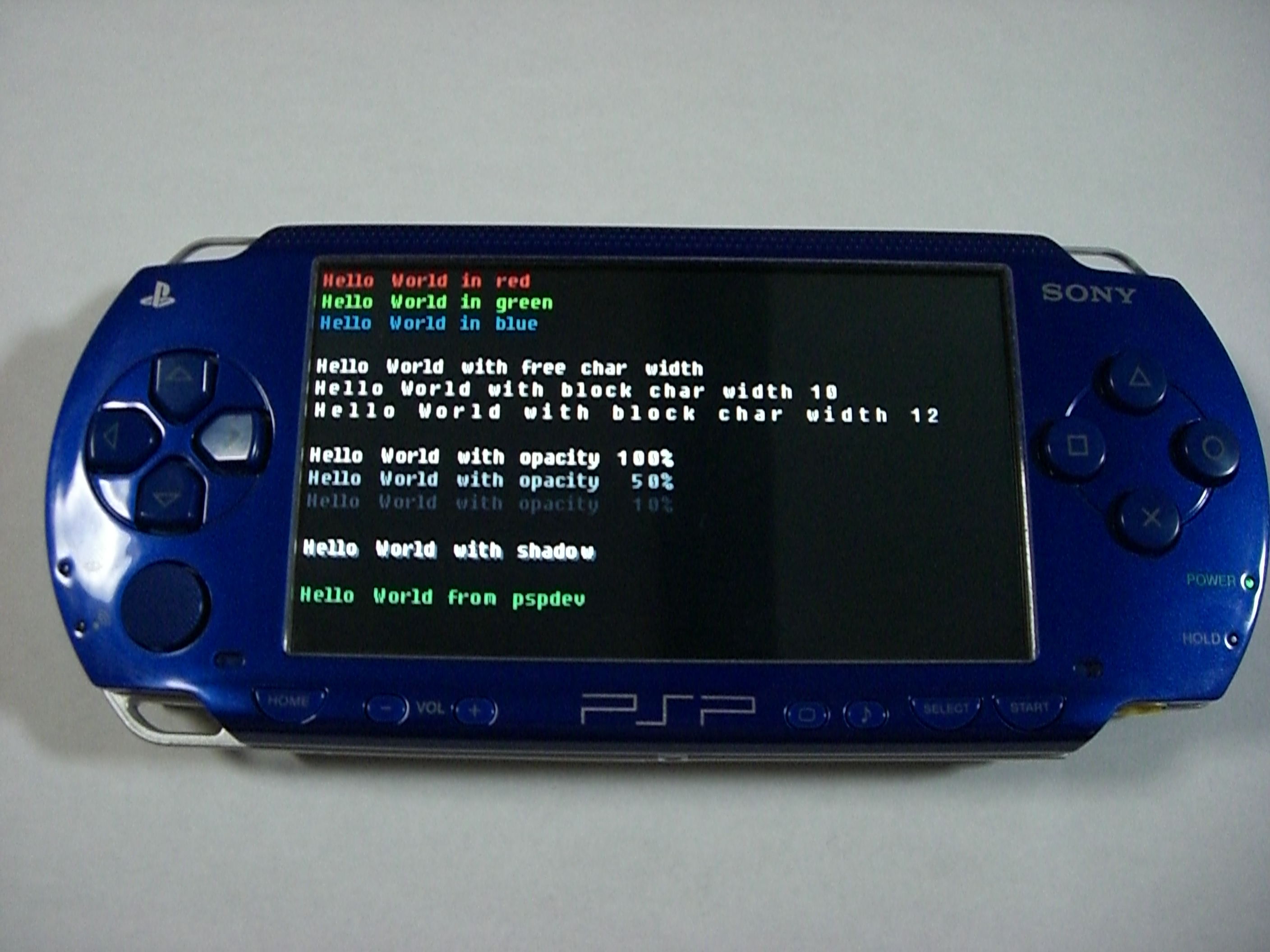
"Hello, World!" program running on a PlayStation Portable

PlayStation Portable homebrew refers to the process of using exploits and hacks to execute unsigned code on the PlayStation Portable (PSP).

== Applications ==
Additional features added including the ability to emulate and play the ROMs of other consoles, play homebrew games, share music, print photos, watch videos from streaming sites such as YouTube, and run additional video formats originally unsupported by the device.

=== Emulation ===
Homebrew emulators were created for NES, SNES, Game Boy Color, Game Boy Advance, Sega Genesis and Nintendo 64 console systems among others. Numerous different emulators were created for the most popular consoles. PlayStation 1 emulation was native, made by Sony.

=== Demoscene ===
The reverse engineering process to understand the PSP hardware started shortly after the advent of homebrew unsigned code execution. This effort led to development of Toolchain and SDK by enthusiasts and paved the way to utilise vector floating point co-processor, GPU and audio capabilities of the device without asking Sony for permission. Several demoscene non-interactive creations were released targeting PSP such as Suicide Barbie, purely to demonstrate optimisation skills of the developers and the power of the handheld.

== History ==
Soon after the PSP was released, hackers began to discover exploits in the PSP that could be used to run unsigned code on the device. Sony released version 1.51 of the PSP firmware in May 2005 to plug the holes that hackers were using to gain access to the device. On 15 June 2005 the hackers distributed the cracked code of the PSP on the internet. Hackers refused to apply updates which would render their hacks unusable so Sony attempted to convince users that there was a benefit to upgrading by including new features in the firmware updates, such as a web browser, and not just security patches to plug the vulnerabilities. BusinessWeek dubbed this the "carrot-and-stick" approach.

In August 2005 Sony released version 2.0 of the firmware which included the web browser, file compatibility updates and other features. Hackers and other homebrew enthusiasts then encountered the first trojan for the PSP. Symantec called this trojan "Trojan.PSPBrick". Users attempting to downgrade their PSP using this software instead found that it was rendered inoperable as this software deleted mandatory/important system files. Over the course of 2005 Sony released six different versions of the firmware and hackers typically responded to it by downgrading to avoid the new security updates.

In mid-2006, after several months of problems in defeating the PSP's firmware a file was posted online which allowed new PSPs running firmware version 2.6 to downgrade to 1.5 so they could then be hacked using older methods. This reportedly caused more buzz in the community than any recent official offerings for the device.

=== Dark_AleX ===
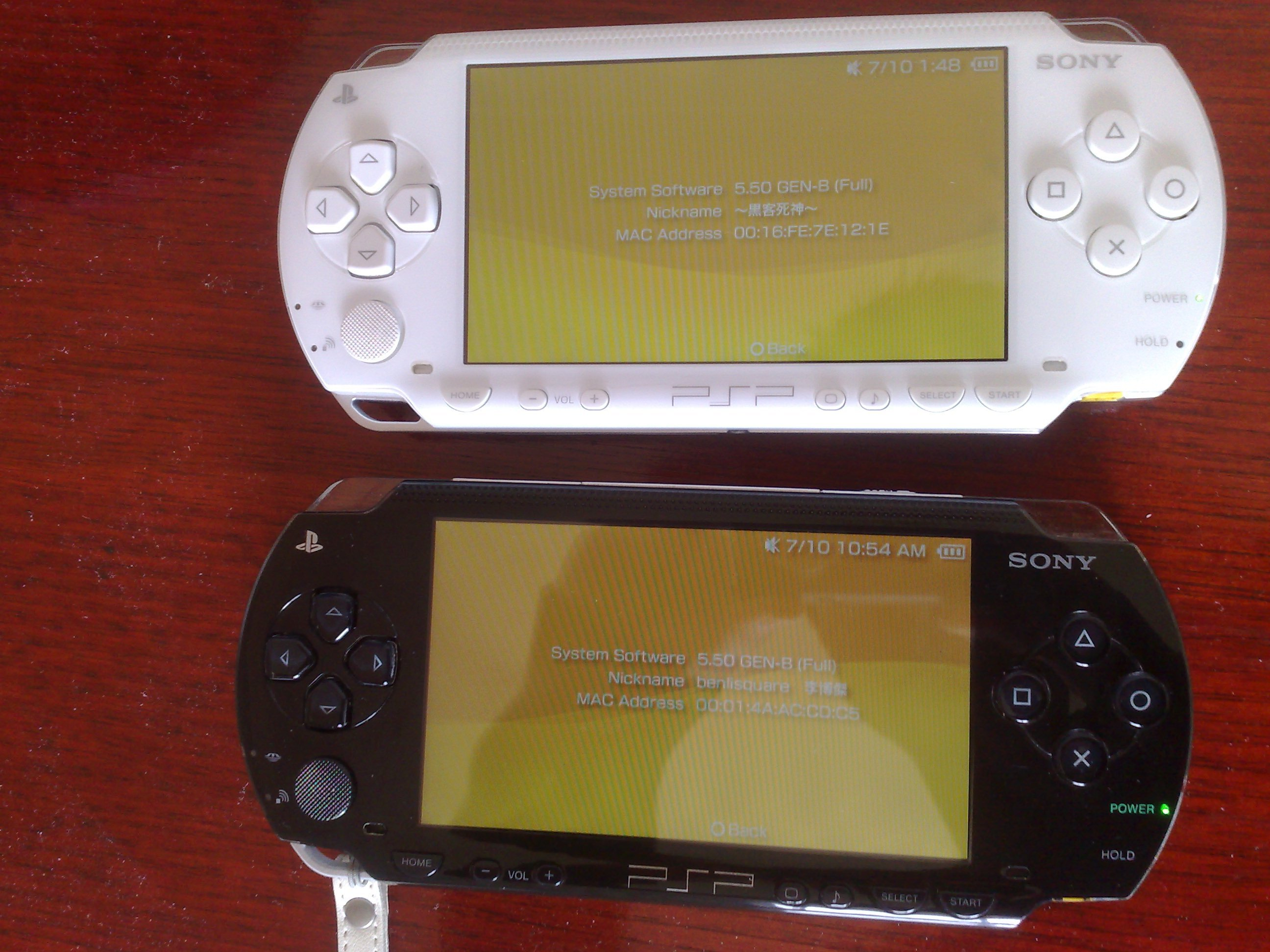
Two PSP-1002s running on 5.50 GEN-B

Dark AleX (aka Dark_AleX, Dax) was a Spanish programmer who wrote homebrew applications for the PlayStation Portable. Dark AleX, as well as other variations of the name, is a pseudonym under which he worked. One of the drawbacks of downgrading the PSP is that new official media may require the presence of a new firmware edition. Dark_Alex had released a Custom Firmware called "Dark Alex's Open Edition firmware" or "Custom Firmware (CFW)" which opens the firmware and allows users to use the existing feature set of the current edition. Sony quickly patched the firmware again, continuing the cat-and-mouse game with the hackers and users. In 2006, Sony released six updates to the system firmware and in 2007 they released another six updates. In July 2007 Dark_AleX officially stopped his work on the PSP, citing perceived problems with Sony as one of the reasons for his departure. Some people even suggested that Dark_AleX was paid by Sony not to release any more custom firmware, but Sony denied this.

Custom Firmware allows the running of unsigned code such as homebrew applications and UMD backups, emulators for other consoles, as well as PlayStation games when the disc images are converted into PSP format.

=== Half Byte Loader ===
Half Byte Loader (also known as HBL) is an open source software project that aims at loading homebrew for PlayStation Portable handheld console through user-mode exploits. It does not provide any mechanism for loading official games or ISO images. HBL was built from scratch to be easily portable to any user-mode exploit. The project was created and started by m0skit0 and ab5000. It is currently maintained by wololo.

HBL was created initially for the Medal of Honor Heroes exploit. An alpha version was released as open source by m0skit0 and ab5000 in November 2009, which ran very simple homebrews. When the Patapon 2 demo exploit was found and leaked, wololo joined the project and proposed to port HBL to this new exploit. The AdvancedPSP forums, which hosted the project, were shut down by the hosting and the project moved to wololo/talk forums. wololo also created a new public SVN repository for HBL at Google Code. Other PSP hackers such as Davee and neur0n joined in to help the development of this port. HBL for Patapon 2 passed to beta version, and can be considered the first useful HBL version, released in March 2010. HBL was subsequently ported to several other user-mode exploits, and also served as base for other projects, like the PRO CFW project.

HBL was also ported to run on Sony PlayStation Vita's PSP emulator with very little modifications. This project was named Vita HBL (VHBL) and was uploaded to HBL's public repository by wololo in March 2012.

=== Latest CFW ===
Nowadays, the most used and recent PSP CFWs are PRO, LME and ARK-4/ARK-5 (the latter two are the latest).

Exploits called cIPL and Infinity allow the user to permanently run a previously installed CFW (like PRO, LME and ARK-4/ARK-5) on a PSP, i.e., after restarting the PSP, the previously installed CFW remains activated without the user having to do any previous step. In ARK-4 and ARK-5's cases, it is also possible to install and use all of its features on the PSP's internal flash memory, allowing the user to remove the Memory Stick and a savedata folder related to the CFW itself ("ARK_01234").

== Statements ==
=== Motivation for homebrew ===
Hackers have stated that the motivation for unlocking the PSP has nothing to do with piracy, but allowing individuals full access to the products they've purchased and the freedom to do what they want with the item as well as the interest in exploring something unknown. Fanjita, a member of the hacker group "N00bz!", stated,

"Everyone has the right to do what they want with their own hardware. Piracy does upset me, and because what we are doing opens the way to piracy it's harder to justify it morally. But our stance on piracy is clear, and we hope to be role models. Sony have never been in touch with me, so I am confident that what we are doing is legal."

=== Sony's position ===
Sony has told the media that any issues resulting from running modified code on the device would void the warranty. They have also stated that the problem is not with homebrew but piracy. However their constant firmware updates have been seen as attempts to hamper homebrew development. According to Phillip Torrone from Make magazine, this hampering could be due to the attempts to curb piracy and may cause more harm than good. He thinks that "the really smart companies should release their products to the alpha geeks for six months and let the alpha geeks play around with them. It seems to me they'd save a lot of money on R&D, and they'd come out with much more solid products."

However, Sony has also said that, when questioned about homebrew game support, Jack Tretton, who was Sony Computer Entertainment America's president and CEO at the time replied with,

"I think that is something that is in the works. We certainly see some of the stuff that has been done via homebrew, and it's incredibly creative. And I think we'd like to try and tap into that a little bit more."
