= List of PlayStation applications =

This is a list of PlayStation applications currently planned or released via the PlayStation Network.

== Applications ==
=== Mobile & PC ===
Application	Requirements	Android	iOS	PC	Mac	Availability	Ref.
PlayStation App	Mobile device	Yes	Yes	No	No	All regions except Nigeria	
PlayStation Family	Mobile device	Yes	Yes	No	No	All regions	
PlayStation Plus	Windows PC	No	No	Yes	No	All regions	
PS Remote Play		Yes	Yes	Yes	Yes	All regions	
PS4 Second Screen	Mobile device	Yes	Yes	No	No	All regions	
DualSense Firmware Updater		No	No	Yes	No	All regions	
Content Manager Assistant		No	No	Yes	Yes	All regions	

=== Entertainment services ===
Application	Requirements	PS Vita	PS3	PS4	PS5	Availability	Ref.
3Player		No	Discontinued	No	Unknown	IE	
7plus		No	Discontinued	Yes	Yes	AU	
9Now		No	No	Discontinued	No	AU	
ABC iview		No	Yes	Yes	No		
AOL On		No	Yes	Yes	Unknown	All SCEA regions	
Amazon Prime Video^{[a]}		No	Yes	Yes	Yes	All regions	
Animax		Yes	Yes	Yes	Unknown	All SCEAsia regions, JP, CZ, DE, HU, RO, SK, UK	
AnimeLab		No	Discontinued	Discontinued	No	AU, NZ	
Major League Soccer/Apple TV		No	No	Yes	Yes	All regions	
AXN		No	Yes	No	Unknown	All SCEAsia & SCEA regions (except CA and US), BG, CZ, HU, IT, PL, RO, SK	
AXN Sci Fi		No	Discontinued	No	Unknown	BG, CZ, HU, IT, PL, RU, SK, UA	
BBC iPlayer		No	Discontinued	Yes	Yes	UK	
BBC News		No	No	Yes	Unknown	UK	
BBC Sport		No	Discontinued	Yes	Unknown	UK	
beIN CONNECT		No	Yes	Yes	Unknown	ES	
beIN Sports		No	Yes	Yes	Unknown	AE, BH, FR, KW, LB, OM, SA	
Blim TV		No	No	Discontinued	Unknown	MX	
Blinkbox		No	Discontinued	No	Unknown	UK	
Blockbuster^{[a]}		No	Yes	Yes	Unknown	DK, FI, NO, SE	
BT Sport		No	No	Yes	Yes	UK	
Channel 4		No	Discontinued	Yes	Yes	UK	
Clan (RTVE)		No	Yes	Yes	Unknown	ES	
Claro video		No	No	Yes	Unknown	All SCEA regions (except CA and US)	
Cinépolis Klic		No	Discontinued	Discontinued	Unknown	MX	
Crackle		Discontinued	Discontinued	Discontinued	Unknown	US	
Crunchyroll		Discontinued	Discontinued	Yes	Yes	All regions	
Dailymotion		No	No	Yes	Unknown	All regions	
Dansk Filmskat		No	Yes	Yes	No	DK	
DAZN		No	No	Yes	Yes	All regions	
Disney+		No	No	Yes	Yes	All regions	
DMM.com		Yes	No	Yes	Yes	JP	
DR TV		No	Yes	Yes	Yes	DK	
du View		Yes	Yes	Yes	Unknown	AE	
DVDPost		No	Planned	Planned	Unknown	BE	
EA Play		No	No	Yes	Yes	All regions	
ABC/ESPN		No	No	Yes	Yes	all regions	
Fan Pass^{[a]} (Sky Sport)		No	No	Yes	Unknown	NZ	
Film1		No	Yes	Yes	Unknown	NL	
FilmBox Live^{[a]}		No	Discontinued	Discontinued	Unknown	AE, BG, CZ, GR, HR, HU, IN, KW, PL, QA, RO, RU, SA, SK, SI, TR	
Filmin^{[a]}		No	Yes	Yes	Unknown	ES	
Filmo TV		No	Yes	Yes	Unknown	FR	
Foxtel Play		No	Yes	Yes	Unknown	AU	
Francetv Sport		No	Yes	Yes	Unknown	FR	
Funimation		No	Discontinued	Discontinued	Discontinued		
Gaiam TV		Yes	Yes	Planned	Unknown	All SCEA regions	
Game One		Yes	Yes	Yes	Unknown	FR	
Gamereactor		No	No	Yes	Unknown	AU, DK, DE, ES, FI, IE, IT, NZ, NO, PT, SE, UK, ZA	
GoPro Channel		No	Yes	Yes	Unknown	US	
HBO Max		No	No	Yes	Yes	All regions	
HKTV Television		Unknown	No	Yes	Unknown	HK	
Hulu		Discontinued	Discontinued	Yes	Yes	All regions	
Icflix		No	Yes	Yes	Unknown	AE, BH, IL, KW, LB, OM, SA	
IGN		No	Yes	Yes	Unknown	All regions	
iHeartRadio		No	Yes	Yes	Unknown		
Infinity		Discontinued	Discontinued	Yes	Yes	IT	
ipla		No	Discontinued	No	Unknown	PL	
ITVX		No	Discontinued	Yes	Yes	UK	
Jook Video		No	Yes	Yes	Unknown	FR	
Joysound.TV Plus		Yes	Yes	Yes	Unknown	JP	
Kayo Sports		No	No	Yes	Yes	AU	
LaSexta		Unknown	Yes	Unknown	Unknown	ES	
Lightbox		No	Discontinued	Discontinued	Unknown	NZ	
Maxdome^{[a]}		No	Yes	Yes	Unknown	AT, CH, DE	
Mediaset Infinity^{[a]}		No	Discontinued	Yes	Yes	IT	
MEO VideoClube		No	Yes	Yes	Unknown	PT	
Min Bio^{[a]}		No	Yes	Yes	No	DK, FI, NO, SE	
MLB.tv^{[a]}		Yes	No	Yes	Unknown	All SCEJ, SCEK, SCEAsia, SCEA regions.	
Movistar+		No	Yes	Yes	Unknown	ES	
MUBI^{[a]}		No	Discontinued	Yes	Unknown	All regions	
Multiplayer.it		No	Yes	Yes	Unknown	IT	
My5		No	Discontinued	Yes	Yes	UK	
myCANAL		No	No	Yes	Yes	FR	
NBA		Yes	Yes	Yes	Unknown	All SCEJ, SCEK, SCEAsia, SCEA regions	
Netflix^{[a]}		Discontinued	Discontinued	Yes	Yes	All regions	
NHK on Demand		Yes	No	No	Unknown	JP	
NHL.tv		Yes	Yes	Yes	Yes	All SCEA regions	
Niconico		Discontinued	No	Yes	Unknown	HK, JP, TW, US	
NOS Sport		No	Yes	Yes	Unknown	NL	
NOS		No	Yes	Yes	Unknown	NL	
Now TV		No	Discontinued	Yes	Yes	UK	
NRK Super		No	Yes	Yes	Unknown	NO	
NRK TV		No	Yes	Yes	Unknown	NO	
OCS 100% cinéma séries^{[a]}		No	Yes	Yes	Unknown	FR	
Okko Movies HD		No	Yes	Yes	Unknown	RU	
Paramount+		No	No	Yes	Yes	All regions	
Pathé Thuis^{[a]}		No	Yes	Yes	Unknown	NL	
Player (TVN)		No	Discontinued	Yes	Unknown	PL	
PlayStation Access		No	No	Yes	Unknown		
PlayStation Music		Discontinued	Discontinued^{[b]}	Discontinued^{[b]}	Unknown		
PlayStation Plus^{[a]}		Discontinued	Discontinued	Yes	Yes	all regions	
Plex		No	Yes	Yes	Yes	All SCEA and SCEE regions	
Plush		No	Yes	Yes	Unknown	BE, LU	
Pluto TV		No	Discontinued	Yes	Yes	All SCEA regions, UK, FR, ES, DE, IT, CH, AT, DA, NO, SK	
Pop		No	No	Discontinued	Unknown	UK	
Popcornflix		No	Discontinued	Discontinued	Unknown	US	
Qello Concerts		Yes	Yes	Yes	Unknown	All SCEA regions and AE, AU, BE, BG, CY, CZ, DK, ES, FI, GR, HR, HU, IS, IN, IE, KW, LB, LU, MT, NL, NZ, NO, OM, PL, PT, QA, RO, RU, SA, SE, SK, SI, UA, UK, ZA	
radiko.jp		Yes	No	No	Unknown	JP	
Red Bull TV		No	Discontinued	Yes	Unknown	All regions	
Redbox Instant		Discontinued	Discontinued	Discontinued	Unknown	US	
RTBF		No	Yes	Yes	Unknown	BE	
RTÉ Player		No	Yes	Planned	Unknown	IE	
RTVE +tdp		No	No	Yes	Unknown	ES	
SBS on Demand		No	Discontinued	Discontinued	Unknown	AU	
Screambox		No	Yes	Yes	Unknown	US	
Shomi		No	No	Discontinued	Unknown	CA	
Showmax		No	No	Yes	Unknown	ZA	
SiriusXM		No	No	Yes	Unknown	US	
SKAI		Unknown	Yes	Yes	Unknown	GR	
Sky Online		Unknown	Yes	Yes	Unknown	AT, DE, IT	
SKY PerfecTV! On demand		Yes	No	No	Unknown	JP	
SnagFilms		Discontinued	Discontinued	Discontinued	Unknown	US	
Sony Entertainment Television		Unknown	Yes	Yes	Unknown	IN, RU, UA	
Sportsnet Now		No	No	Yes	Unknown	CA	
Spotify		No	Yes	Yes	Yes		
Stan		No	Yes	Yes	Yes	AU	
StarzPlay		No	No	Yes	Unknown	AE, BH, KW, LB, OM, QA, SA	
TBS Seikaiisan Selection		Yes	No	No	Unknown	JP	
Total Channel		No	Yes	Yes	Unknown	ES	
Tsutaya TV		Yes	No	No	Unknown	JP	
TuneIn		Yes	Yes	Yes	Yes	All regions except JP and FI	
TV3 (3alacarta)		No	Yes	Yes	Unknown	ES	
TV Dogatch		Discontinued	No	No	Unknown	JP	
TV from Sky^{[a]} (Sky Go)		No	Discontinued	Yes	Yes	IE, UK	
Tubi TV		No	Discontinued	Yes	Yes	All SCEA regions	
TV2 Sumo		No	Yes	Yes	Unknown	NO	
Tvigle			Yes	Yes	Unknown	RU	
TVNZ+		No	Discontinued	Yes	Yes	NZ	
Twitch		Discontinued	Discontinued	Yes	Yes	All regions	
U-Next		Discontinued	No	Yes	Yes	JP	
UFC Fight Pass		No	No	Plannedstyle="background:#bfd; color:black; vertical-align:middle; text-align:center; " class="table-yes2 skin-invert" |	style="background: var(--background-color-interactive, #EEE); color: var(--color-base, black); vertical-align: middle; text-align: center; " class="table-Unknown" | Unknown		
Vevo		No	Discontinued	Yes and YouTube	YouTube	AU, BR, CA, DE, ES, FR, IE, IT, MX, NL, NZ, PL, UK, US	
Viaplay		No	Discontinued	Yes	Yes	DK, FI, NO, SE	
Videoland		No	Discontinued	Yes	Unknown	NL	
VidZone		No	Discontinued	Discontinued	Unknown	AU, AT, BE, CH, DE, DK, ES, FI, FR, IE, IT, LU, NL, NO, NZ, PT, SE, UK, US	
VRV		No	No	Discontinued	Unknown	US	
Vudu		No	Yes	Yes	Unknown	US	
WatchESPN		No	No	Discontinued	Unknown	US	
Watchever^{[a]}		No	Discontinued	Discontinued	Unknown	DE	
WeatherNation		No	No	Yes	Unknown	US	
Wuaki.tv		No	Yes	Yes	Unknown	ES	
Peacock/WWE		No	Discontinued	Yes	Yes	All regions	
YLE Areena		No	Discontinued	Yes	Yes	FI	
Yomvi (Canal+)		No	Discontinued	Discontinued	Unknown	ES	
YouTube/YouTube TV		Discontinued	Discontinued	Yes	Yes	All regions	
YuppTV		No	Yes	Yes	Unknown	All regions	
a Various rental/subscription fees may apply b Replaced with Spotify

=== Assorted ===
Application	Requirements	PS Vita	PS3	PS4	PS5	Availability	Ref.
adhocParty	PlayStation Portable	No	Yes	No		All SCEJ, SCEK, SCEAsia, SCEE regions and CA, US	
Amnesia World AR		Yes	No	No		JP	
Call of Duty Elite Console App		No	Yes	No		All regions	
Colors!		Yes	No	No		CA, US	
DailyBurn		No	Yes	No		US	
E-book Reader		Yes	No	No		JP	
edyViewer		No	Yes	No		JP	
EyeCreate		No	Yes	No		All SCEE regions and CA, HK, KR, SG, TW, US	
Flickr		Yes	No	No		All SCEJ, SCEK, SCEAsia, SCEE regions and BR, CA, MX, US	
Headset Companion App		No	Yes	Yes		AE, AU, BH, BE, BG, CA, CY, CZ, DK, FI, GR, HR, HU, IS, KW, LB, MT, NL, NZ, NO, OM, PL, QA, RO, SA, SK, SI, SE, TR, UK, US, ZA	
Grand Theft Auto: iFruit		Discontinued	No	No		All SCEK, SCEAsia, SCEA and SCEE regions	
Imaginstruments		Yes	No	No		All SCEE, SCEA regions except CO, PE	
iKnow!		Yes	No	No		JP	
Invizimals: Hidden Challenges		Yes	No	No		CL, BH, CY, DK, FI, IS, IL, LB, MT, NO, OM, PL, RO, SE, UK, ZA	
J-Stars VictoryVS AR trial		Yes	No	No		JP	
Live from PlayStation		Yes	No	Yes		All regions	
LiveTweet		Discontinued	No	No		All SCEJ, SCEK, SCEAsia, SCEE regions and BR, CA, MX, US	
Media Player		Unknown	Yes	Yes			
Mobile Suit Gundam Battle Operation Support App		Yes	No	No		JP	
Move.me (Server)		No	Yes	No		CA, US	
naspocket (Network Media Player)		Yes	No	No		All SCEJ, SCEK, SCEAsia, SCEE regions	
MyNBA2K15		Discontinued	No	No		All SCEA regions	
Paint Park Plus		Yes	No	No		All regions except CO and PE	
Photo Kano Kiss AR		Yes	No	No		JP	
PixelJunk 4am Live Viewer		No	Yes	No		All regions	
PlayMemories Online		No	Yes	Yes		All SCEA region and AT, AU, BE, CH, DK, DE, ES, FI, FR, HK, IN, IE, IT, JP, KR, NL, NZ, NO, PL, RU, SE, SG, TW, UK	
The Playroom	PlayStation Camera	No	No	Yes			
PlayTV	PlayTV tuner	No	Yes	No		AU, BH, CY, CZ, DE, ES, FR, IS, IE, IT, LB, MT, NZ, AT, OM, PT, RO, SK, UK	
PocketStation		Yes	No	No		JP	
PS2 System Data	BC PS3 model	No	Yes	No		JP, CA, US	
Resistance: Burning Skies AR Monument Viewer		Yes	No	No		CA, MX, US	
Robotics;Notes Elite AR		Yes	No	No		JP	
SHAREfactory		No	No	Yes		All regions	
Torne		Yes	Yes	Yes		JP	
Treasure Park		Yes	No	No		All SCEE regions and CA, HK, IN, JP, MX, MY, SG, TW, TH, US	
uke-torne		Yes	No	No		JP	
PlayStation FC UEFA Champions League		No	No	Yes		All SCEE regions	
Visualizer		No	Yes	No		All regions except CO, PE	
Wake-up Club		Yes	No	No		All regions except AR, CL, CO, PE	

=== Virtual Reality ===
Application	Requirements	Availability	Ref.
360Channel VR	PSVR		
anywhereVR	PSVR		
Jaunt VR	PSVR		
Littlstar VR Cinema	PSVR		
360Channel VR	PSVR		
NewsVR	PSVR		
SculptrVR	PSVR		
Within	PSVR		

=== Archaic ===
Application	Requirements	PlayStation Portable	Availability	Ref.
Invizimals: Hidden Challenges		Yes	CL, BH, CY, DK, FI, IS, IL, LB, MT, NO, OM, PL, RO, SE, UK, ZA	
UMD registration application		Yes	JP	

== License regions ==
License	Store	(Alpha-2/Alpha-3) Country
SCEJ	PN.CH.MIXED.JP	(JP/JPN) Japan
SCEK	MSF86012	(KR/KOR) South Korea
SCEAsia	MSF86012	(HK/HKG) Hong Kong, (ID/IDN) Indonesia, (MY/MYS) Malaysia, (SG/SGP) Singapore, (TW/TWN) Taiwan, (TH/THA) Thailand,
SCEA	MSF77008	(AR/ARG) Argentina, (BR/BRA) Brazil, (CA/CAN) Canada, (CL/CHL) Chile, (CO/COL) Colombia, (MX/MEX) Mexico, (PE/PER) Peru, (US/USA) United States
SCEE	MSF75508	(AU/AUS) Australia, (AT/AUT) Austria, (BH/BHR) Bahrain, (BE/BEL) Belgium, (BG/BGR) Bulgaria, (HR/HRV) Croatia, (CY/CYP) Cyprus, (CZ/CZE) Czech Republic, (DK/DNK) Denmark, (FI/FIN) Finland, (FR/FRA) France, (DE/DEU) Germany, (GR/GRC) Greece, (HU/HUN) Hungary, (IS/ISL) Iceland, (IN/IND) India, (IE/IRL) Ireland, (IL/ISR) Israel, (IT/ITA) Italy, (KW/KWT) Kuwait, (LB/LBN) Lebanon, (LU/LUX) Luxembourg, (MT/MLT) Malta, (NL/NLD) Netherlands, (NZ/NZL) New Zealand, (NO/NOR) Norway, (OM/OMN) Oman, (PL/POL) Poland, (PT/PRT) Portugal, (QA/QAT) Qatar, (RO/ROU) Romania, (RU/RUS) Russia, (SA/SAU) Saudi Arabia, (SK/SVK) Slovakia, (SI/SVN) Slovenia, (ZA/ZAF) South Africa, (ES/ESP) Spain, (SE/SWE) Sweden, (CH/CHE) Switzerland, (TR/TUR) Turkey, (UA/UKR) Ukraine, (AE/ARE) United Arab Emirates, (GB/GBR) United Kingdom
