= Wii U GamePad =

Primary game controller for the Wii U

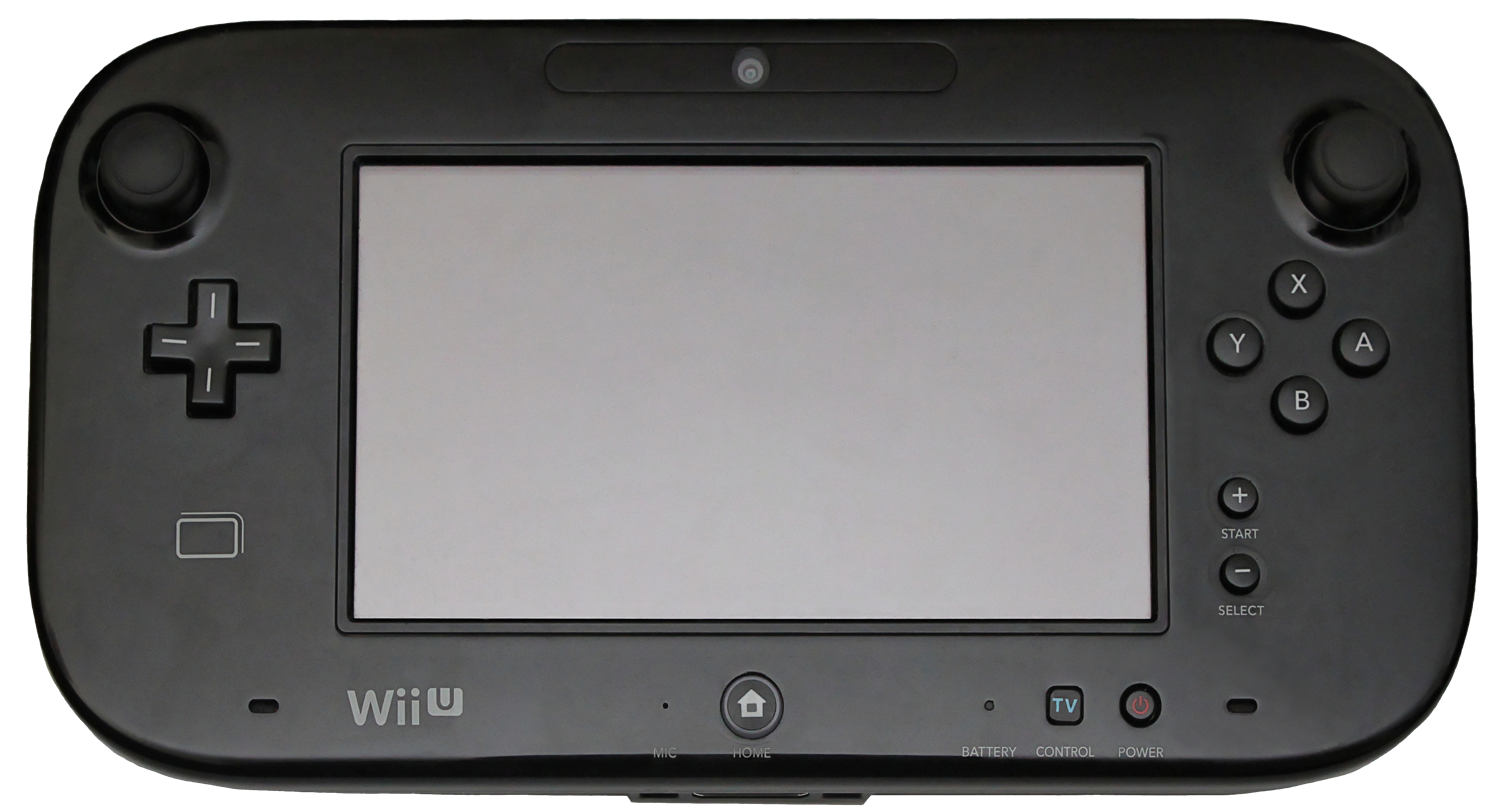
- A black-colored Wii U GamePad
- Developer: Nintendo IRD
- Manufacturer: Nintendo
- Type: Gamepad
- Generation: Eighth
- Released: NA: November 18, 2012; PAL: November 30, 2012; JP: December 8, 2012
- Lifespan: 2012–2017
- Discontinued: WW: January 31, 2017
- Display: 6.2 inch (15.7 cm) 854 × 480 (FWVGA) 16:9 @ 158 ppi
- Sound: Stereo speakers, headphones
- Input: Motion sensing; Touchscreen; 2 analog sticks; D-pad; Digital buttons; Microphone; Gyroscope; Accelerometer; Magnetometer; Extension connector
- Camera: 1.3 MP front-facing camera
- Touchpad: Single-touch LCD
- Connectivity: Proprietary wireless based on IEEE 802.11n, NFC, FeliCa, infrared
- Power: LiPo 3.7 V DC 1500 mAh (WUP-012; 3–5 hours use); LiPo 3.6 V DC 2550 mAh (upgrade WUP-013; 8 hours use)
- Dimensions: 5.3 in × 0.9 in × 10.2 in (13.5 cm × 2.3 cm × 25.9 cm)
- Weight: 491 g
- Predecessor: Wii Remote
- Successor: Joy-Con and Nintendo Switch Pro Controller
- Related: Wii U Pro Controller

The Wii U GamePad is the standard game controller for Nintendo's Wii U home video game console. Incorporating features from tablet computers, the GamePad has traditional input methods (such as buttons, dual pressable analog sticks, and a D-pad), touchscreen controls, and motion controls. The touchscreen can be used to supplement a game by providing alternate, second screen functionality, or an asymmetric view of a scenario in a game. The screen can also be used to play a game strictly on the GamePad screen without the use of a television display. Conversely, non-gaming functions can be assigned to it as well, such as using it as a television remote.

In 2009, the development of the Wii U GamePad began alongside development of the main Wii U console. The Wii U GamePad can be used in conjunction with other controllers compatible with the console, such as the Wii Remote Plus, Nunchuk, Wii Balance Board, and the more conventional Wii U Pro Controller.

Response to the Wii U GamePad was mixed. Critics praised the comfortable feel of the GamePad, but criticized the battery life, and misuse of the Wii U GamePad's potential in games and software.

== History ==
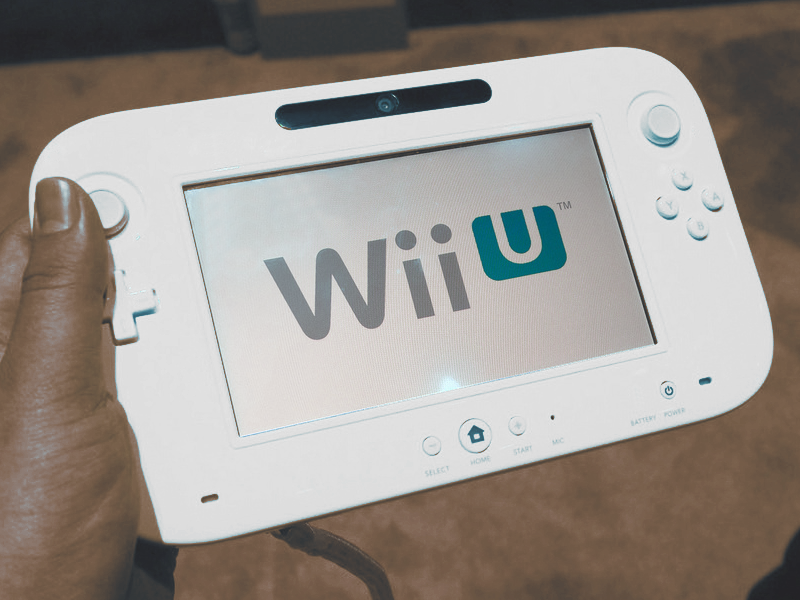
The originally-unveiled Wii U GamePad prototype, featuring circle pads instead of analog sticks

Over one decade prior to the release of the Wii U, Nintendo released the GameCube to Game Boy Advance link cable, which allowed players to connect Game Boy Advance consoles to the GameCube's controller ports, allowing access to game-specific features such as alternative control styles and exclusive games and menus. One notable use of this cable was in The Legend of Zelda: Four Swords Adventures (2004); the game's multiplayer mode, which required each player to use a Game Boy Advance, allowed for the main action to be displayed on the TV and the individual players to go off screen, with their own Game Boy Advance's screen following their actions.

During development of the Wii console, video game designer Shigeru Miyamoto incorporated the functionality of mobile phones, controllers, and automotive navigation systems while designing the Wii Remote, eventually producing a prototype that resembled a cell phone. Another design featured both an analog stick and a touchscreen, but Nintendo rejected the idea of a touchscreen on the controller, "since the portable console and living-room console would have been exactly the same".

Nintendo's development team had determined that the Wii's notification light did not provide enough information to be useful beyond whether it had received content or not. With the complexity of modern televisions, Miyamoto believed that a monitor separate from the console would provide an easier way to check on the console's status without needing to use the television. Its operation as a supplemental display was also inspired by similar displays found at karaoke establishments in Japan, which show song information and allows its users to select their next song.

Satoru Iwata explained that the controller's design is intended to allow players to "see games in a different way," a concept referred to as "asymmetric gaming" during Nintendo's E3 2012 press conference. With the Wii U's Miiverse social networking functionality, Iwata also likened the controller's screen to a "social window", which can allow users to remain connected even if they are not playing. Gyroscopic capabilities were added by the team specifically to aid in aiming for first and third person shooter games.

The Nintendo EAD development team created two controller prototypes: a monitor with two Wii Remotes glued to the sides, and a display attached to a Wii Zapper. In a prototype shown at E3, the controller had featured circle pads similar to those of the Nintendo 3DS. On May 19, 2012, a photograph of a near-final version of the controller was leaked on Twitter by an employee of TT Games, revealing a wider build with ergonomic grips, a redesigned button layout, and analog sticks instead of circle pads. On June 3, 2012, Nintendo officially unveiled the final version of the controller, named the "Wii U GamePad", in a video presentation preceding E3 2012. The presentation confirmed the leaked changes, and unveiled other features making use of the screen.

The Wii U GamePad was only sold separately in Japan, costing ¥13,284 (equivalent to ¥14,740 in 2024). It released online on November 24, 2015. In 2013, hackers reverse engineered the Wii U GamePad, connecting it to a computer playing an emulated version of The Legend Of Zelda: The Wind Waker.

== Features ==
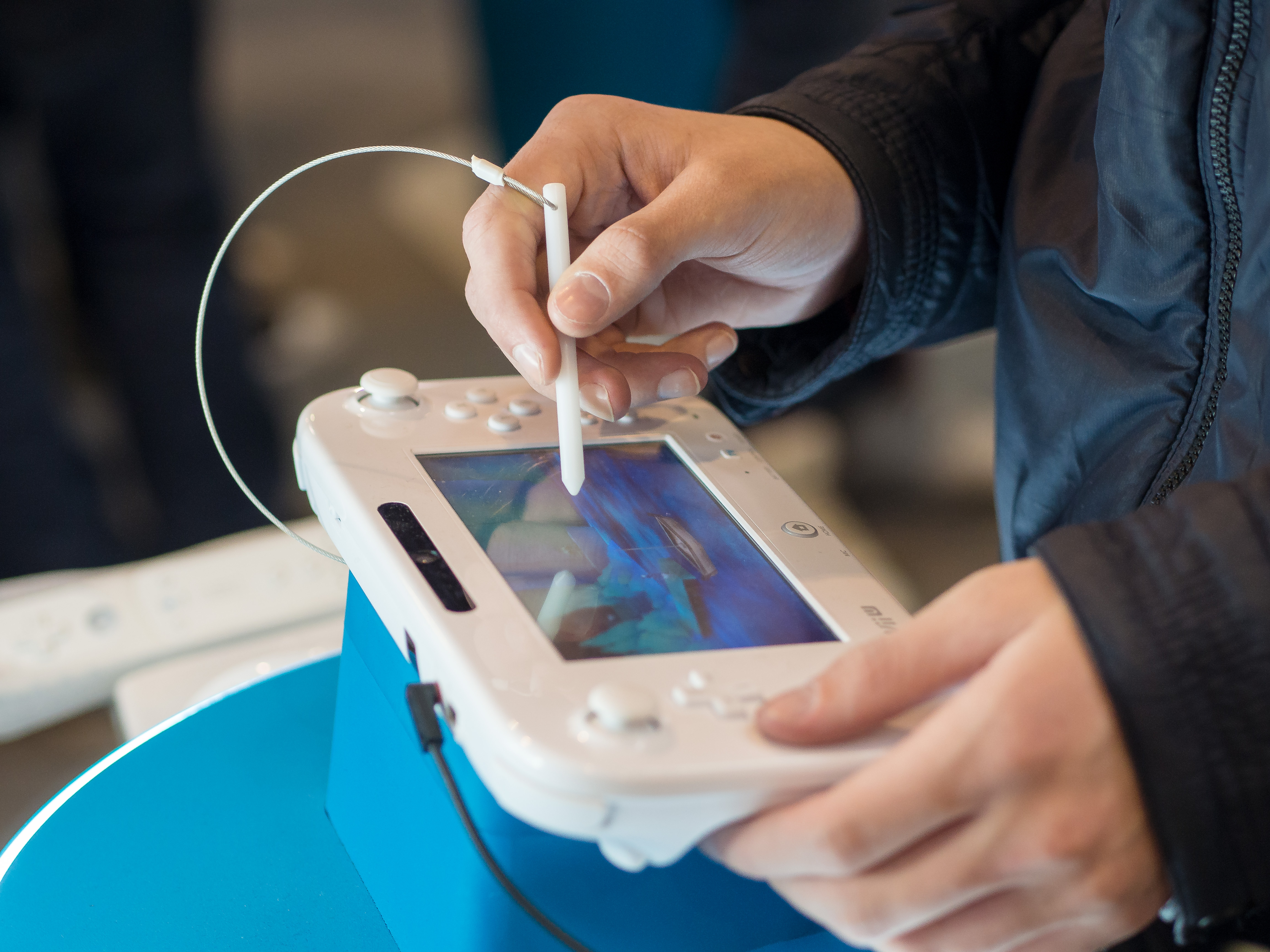
The Wii U GamePad features a 6.2 in resistive touchscreen.

The GamePad's primary feature is its 6.2 in (16 cm), FWVGA (854x480), resistive touchscreen display, which can be controlled with either fingers or an included stylus. The screen can be used as a supplement to gameplay to provide additional functionality that can be controlled using the screen, or to stream gameplay from the console in lieu of a television display (Off-TV Play) depending on each game.

The controller also features a front-facing camera (usable for video chat), and dual analog sticks, nine-axis motion detection via a three-axis accelerometer, three-axis gyroscope and a three-axis magnetometer, rumble support, and an infrared array that can emulate the Wii Sensor Bar. The GamePad also supports NFC, which allows developers to create figurines (such as Nintendo's Amiibo figures) or cards that can wirelessly interact with the controller, and allowed Japanese users to pay for software on the Nintendo eShop using prepaid FeliCa-based transit cards such as Suica. In a special presentation preceding E3 2012, Nintendo unveiled more details about the GamePad, including its ability to be used as a remote control for a television with the Nintendo TVii app and the ability to send handwritten messages and other content.

The GamePad communicates with a Wii U console over a modified Wi-Fi protocol designed for low-latency transmission, establishing its connection with the console by using a variant of the WPS process, with proprietary transfer protocol and software co-developed with Broadcom. The GamePad's display contents are streamed as video from the console using a custom protocol and the H.264 video codec, for which the GamePad contains a hardware decoder.

Nintendo's first presentation of the controller in 2011 led to confusion upon whether the Wii U would support the use of multiple GamePads. A Nintendo spokesperson stated that the GamePad would not be sold individually from a Wii U console, and Shigeru Miyamoto had not ruled out the possibility of using multiple GamePads with a single console. However, Miyamoto also felt that it might be more convenient to use the Nintendo 3DS as a controller in this scenario as well, implying potential compatibility. During Nintendo's E3 2012 presentation, it was confirmed that Wii U games could theoretically support up to two GamePads simultaneously. However, this feature was ultimately never supported by any official software, alongside an unused accessory port at the bottom of the unit. According to former Nintendo of America president Reggie Fils-Aimé, this was due to the console's install base "never getting large enough that that type of implementation made sense" and because Nintendo never created a game where two GamePads were needed, adding "there needs to be a game that drives that implementation".

== Reception ==
The Wii U GamePad received mixed reviews from critics. Stephen Totilo, from Kotaku, praised the GamePad, stating he did not find the controller "too heavy" due to the inbuilt screen. Totilo also praised the "superb connection" between the GamePad and the console, believing "The GamePad screen's ability to stay in constant sync with the TV screen is as welcome as it was necessary for the Wii U version of multi-screen gaming to work."

The battery life of the GamePad was criticized for being too short. Andrew Hayward of TechRadar stated in his review "with the [GamePad's] brightness on max which we found essential for getting the best-quality play experience, we struggled to push past that three-hour mark." Hayward also criticized the range of the GamePad, which reportedly works up to 25 feet away from the console. In response to the criticism, Nintendo would issue a 2550mAh battery in Japan with over 8 hours of battery life, versus the original 3-5 hour battery life on the original 1500mAh battery.

Another criticism of the Wii U GamePad was the misuse of the Wii U GamePad's potential in games and software. One of the games criticized was Minecraft: Wii U Edition, which did not have any Wii U GamePad features, leaving fans disappointed. Many critics felt Nintendo was not using the Wii U GamePad properly in games. Nintendo of America's Executive VP of Sales Scott Moffitt admitted this, stating "[w]ith games like Star Fox and Mario Maker, we are continuing to show the promise of the Gamepad and, candidly, early on we probably didn't showcase the promise of the Gamepad as well as we could have."

Rob Crossley from GameSpot heavily criticized the controller, comparing it to the Virtual Boy controller, and stating games such as Super Mario 3D World, Super Smash Bros for Wii U, and Mario Kart 8 do not employ the GamePad in a meaningful way. Crossley also called the GamePad a "chubby and clumsy touch-screen controller". He also criticized the Off-TV Play feature for being "not a system seller" stating that "most people will not use it with any regularity, and only a few will swear by it."

How the GamePad's audio was handled in conjunction to the TV's audio also received criticism. Destructoid remarked that when games were started normally with the TV and GamePad on, many games by default just duplicated the same audio stream to both the TV and GamePad (for Off-TV Play), which caused the audio to sound "echo-y and weird as well as crunchy and not very loud" and the lack of an option to control the audio output forced users to manually mute the TV or GamePad speakers to avoid the issue. Nintendo Life noted that when they played a game which outputted different audio for the TV and GamePad, the character dialogue which came from the GamePad was poorly balanced against the TV sound, and criticized the lack of an option to output all audio from either the TV or the GamePad's speakers or audio jack.

== See also ==
- List of Nintendo controllers
- Xbox SmartGlass
- Nintendo Switch
- Nintendo Switch 2
- PlayStation Portal
