= Mongrels (TV series) =

British television series

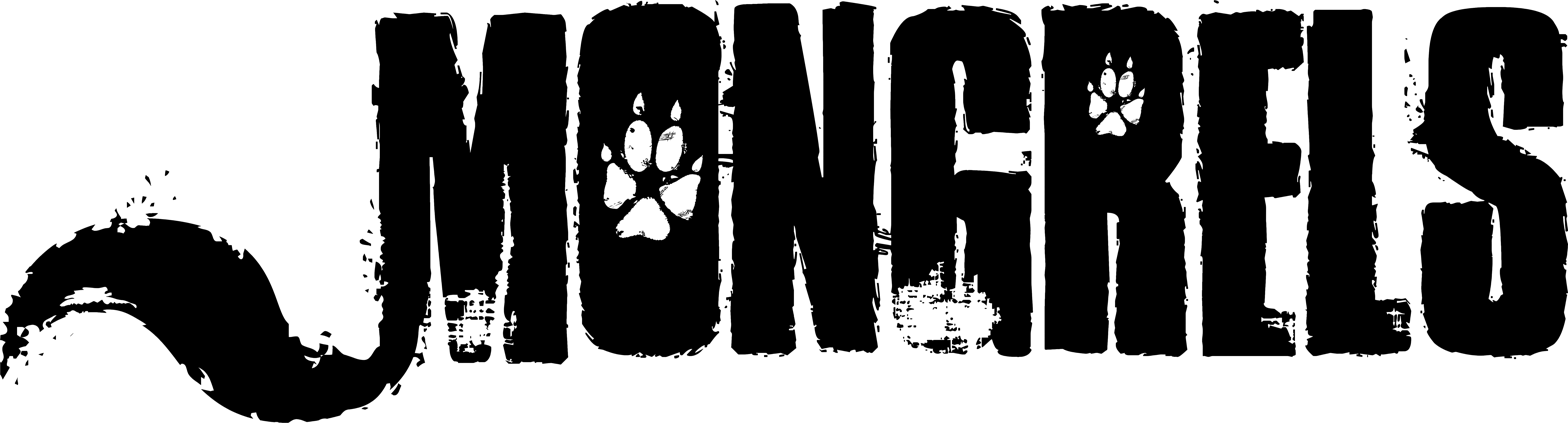
- The logo for Mongrels
- Genre: Sitcom; Black comedy
- Created by: Adam Miller
- Written by: Jon Brown; Daniel Peak
- Directed by: Adam Miller
- Starring: Andy Heath; Iestyn Evans; Richard Coombs; Warrick Brownlow-Pike
- Voices of: Rufus Jones; Lucy Montgomery; Katy Brand; Dan Tetsell; Paul Kaye; Phil Cornwell
- Theme music composer: Joe Henson; Richie Webb
- Country of origin: United Kingdom
- No. of series: 2
- No. of episodes: 17 (list of episodes)

Production
- Producer: Stephen McCrum
- Editor: Nigel Williams
- Running time: 28 minutes
- Production company: BBC Productions

Original release
- Network: BBC Three
- Release: 22 June 2010 – 19 December 2011

Mongrels is a British puppet-based musical sitcom first broadcast on BBC Three between 22 June and 10 August 2010, with a making-of documentary entitled "Mongrels Uncovered" broadcast on 11 August 2010. A second and final series of Mongrels began airing on 7 November 2011.

The series revolves around five anthropomorphic animals who live around the back of a pub in Millwall, the Isle of Dogs, London. The main characters are Nelson, a metrosexual fox (voiced by Rufus Jones and performed by Andy Heath); Destiny, an Afghan Hound (voiced by Lucy Montgomery and performed by Richard Coombs and Sue Beattie); Marion, a "borderline-retarded" cat (voiced by Dan Tetsell and performed by Warrick Brownlow-Pike); Kali, a grudge-bearing pigeon (voiced by Katy Brand and performed by Iestyn Evans); and Vince, a sociopathic foul-mouthed fox (voiced by Paul Kaye and performed by various puppeteers).

The show is aimed at an adult audience, and features "neutering, incontinence, cannibalism and catnip overdoses" and uses several humour styles such as slapstick and farce. For example, the first episode begins with Marion, who is portrayed as desperately trying to revive his deceased owner, learns she has actually been dead for four months, whereupon he casually gives his cat friends permission to eat her. Mongrels has attracted accusations of plagiarism, with claims that Mongrels stole ideas from a similar Channel 4 show called Pets.

On 18 January 2012, it was announced via Twitter that Mongrels had not been renewed for a third series by the BBC. Despite this, the characters have continued to make public appearances since, including at furry conventions, as well as making cameos in other TV programmes.

== Plot ==
The main characters in Mongrels (left to right): Destiny, Nelson, Kali (top), Marion (bottom) and Vince.

Mongrels follows five animals that live around the back of a pub called The Lord Nelson in Millwall, on the Isle of Dogs in the East End of London.

- Nelson (Vulpus metrosexualus) – a fox and the protagonist of the series who lives a metrosexual lifestyle and is described as: "The only wild fox in East London with subscriptions to all the major broadsheets (excluding The Sunday Times), Nelson is, as he never tires of introducing himself at dinner parties... 'An urbane fox!'"
- Destiny (Canis self-absorbedb*tchicus) – an Afghan Hound who is Nelson's love interest and best friend, though she has no interest in him. Destiny is also the pet of Gary (Tony Way), the landlord of The Lord Nelson who, like the other human characters in the series, is unable to understand what Destiny and the other animals say.
- Marion (Felis ret**dicus) – an unintelligent cat towards whom Nelson acts as a father figure. He has been abandoned by several owners and is easily corruptible.
- Kali (Aves aggravaticus) – a sadistic pigeon who revels in the misfortune of others, and speaks with a Black English accent. She has several grudges, including a hatred for humans and foxes for the way they treat birds. Her name is a pun on the word callipygian.
- Vince (Vulpus c**ticus) – a violent, foul-mouthed fox who considers himself a proper animal. Almost all his lines contain at least one swear word that is constantly censored.

There is no overriding story arc between episodes, though each episode does contain recurring elements. During each episode, there are cutaways from the main plot to create extra gags. Most episodes also feature at least one celebrity appearance and every episode features a comic song. Episodes also sometimes contain references to events in previous episodes.

== Cast and characters ==
- Rufus Jones as the voice of Nelson, an urban fox who has embraced a middle-class, metrosexual lifestyle. Operated by Andy Heath
- Dan Tetsell as the voice of Marion, a homeless Persian cat. Operated by Warrick Brownlow-Pike
- Lucy Montgomery as the voice of Destiny, a beautiful Afghan Hound. Operated by Richard Coombs and Sue Beattie
- Katy Brand as the voice of Kali, a cynical, vindictive and street smart pigeon. Operated by Iestyn Evans
- Paul Kaye as the voice of Vince, a violent, foul-mouthed and sociopathic fox. Operated by various puppeteers
- Tony Way as Gary, Destiny's owner.
- Ruth Bratt as various incidental characters.

== Creation ==
The show took five years to develop. The idea was first suggested between the creator and director of Mongrels, Adam Miller, and the show's head puppeteer, Andy Heath, when they worked on the CITV show Ripley and Scuff.

Miller described Mongrels as: "an adult sitcom, trying to do for puppetry what American shows like The Simpsons have done for animation. Obviously that's aiming very high. Think [stage musical] Avenue Q meets Family Guy but with puppet animals." He also said that: "We wanted to make something that had the pace of an American animation but with British sensibilities, that was adult, but not crude, that was based in the realities of the animal world, and that didn't rely on the puppets to do the comedy."

The original idea, known as The Un-Natural World was of an urban fox living in Brixton called Nelson, who was so used to living in the city that he had lost any sense of being an animal. It also featured a cat, Marion, who was trying to encourage Nelson to be more animal-like.

While Miller was working on a BBC Three sitcom he pitched the idea to producer Stephen McCrum. McCrum criticised the way Miller ended the first script, which ended with Nelson and Marion leaving where they live. McCrum told him it was best to set the series in a single place rather than have the characters move from one place to another. McCrum then suggested taking Nelson and Marion, and writing a script about them. Later, another writer, Jon Brown came in to write and at this time rules were set out with regards to writing the show, such as the animals could not be dressed in clothes unless it was in a flashback sequence or during a song.

The new script was then pitched to the BBC. A pitch pilot, inspired by the one created for The Muppet Show, was made. Miller argued that when The Muppet Show did it, "it just must have just knocked the socks off the people who saw it, because it's like nothing you've ever seen before, and we thought: 'Why fix what ain't broke, so we did our own very British version of that." The producers liked it but did not fully understand what the show was about. Miller, Brown and a third writer, Daniel Peak began to write scripts over a period of four years. A pilot was eventually filmed and the BBC commissioned a full series, targeted at adults. Despite the adult nature, Miller did not want to make the show too crude. Eight episodes were filmed in the first series so as to spread the cost of making the series over each episode.

=== Character development ===
When writing for the commissioned series began, the character of Nelson was originally depicted as being brash and obnoxious. This was later changed to make him more metrosexual, middle class and likeable. Developing the character of Destiny, Nelson's love interest, was a challenge to the programme makers. Kali was created to be a villain, with Miller describing her as a "Hitler-figure". Vince was partly based on the brash version of Nelson.

In the pilot episode, titled We Are Mongrels, a sixth main character was included who was named Debbie. Debbie was a suicidal chicken who never left her coop. However, it was decided that the writers could not sustain the character for a full series, and as such the character was axed. Another chicken character called Wendy appeared in the first broadcast episode as a reference to Debbie. Both characters had the same voice actress, Ruth Bratt, who performed Wendy's voice in exactly the same manner as that of Debbie.

=== Casting ===
Rufus Jones was among the first people auditioned for the role of Nelson. After several other auditions with other actors, Jones was called upon to play the part. Paul Kaye at one time provided the voice for Nelson before taking the role of Vince.

It was then decided by the creators to make Marion a foreign character and to find an accent that reflected this. There was discussion about Iranian-British comic Omid Djalili playing the role. In the end, Tetsell was cast after auditioning with a poor version of Djalili's Iranian accent. Tetsell describes the voice as a mixture of, "every accent on the planet", but with the joke that Marion was meant to be a Persian cat. Tetsell also explained how it was easy to drop into a Russian accent while doing the voice of Marion.

=== Puppets ===
When the puppet for Marion was first created, he was depicted as having stripy fur, but looked more like a mouse in the eyes of the crew, so his puppet was changed. Marion's body shape and image was based on topless photos of the comic actor James Corden.

The show's puppeteers claim there are different problems working with different characters. For example, Destiny is the largest puppet and so moving her is more difficult. As Marion spends much of his time in a rubbish bin, his puppeteer, Warrick Brownlow-Pike, has to stand inside a bottomless bin for long periods of time. Kali is said to be the most difficult puppet to work with, because as she has no hands she is limited to what she can hold.

=== Recording ===
The show was originally entitled We Are Mongrels, but the title had to be changed for two reasons: one was that the title was too similar to another BBC Three comedy show, We Are Klang. The other is that none of the characters were mongrels. Therefore, new suggestions were called for. Rejected titles included I, Nelson; Humans! Everywhere!; Undergrowth and Never Been Stroked. The last of these titles was rejected after one of the show's additional writers, Danielle Ward; "said it sounded like 'a makeover show for virgins'." During this time the crew referred to the show as Mongrels and it eventually became the show's title.

When writing for Vince, the writers blanked out all of the characters swearing like it is done on the show, but when the voice lines for the episodes were recorded, the swear words had to be put in for Kaye to read them. During read-throughs of the scripts, a toy horn was honked whenever Kaye swore to give an idea of what it would sound like during the programme.

The show also aimed to be environmentally friendly in its production. A report from the BBC's in-house publication Ariel: "From reusable water bottles filled from tanks of tap water to double-sided scripts, Mongrels is aiming to be the most sustainable production at the BBC." The production team also use reusable or compostable cutlery in their canteen, reducing any future merchandise packaging to just a barcode, and replacing conventional lighting with fluorescent tube lights. This last move reduced the electricity bill for the second series by a third, saving £500 a week.

== Broadcast ==
The show premiered on BBC Three on 22 June 2010 at 22:00, and in high-definition on the BBC HD channel on 24 June at 23:50. The third episode of Series 1, "Marion the Young Lover", was viewed by 417,000 viewers during its premiere airing on BBC Three. The first episode of Series 1 had been requested 211,000 times on BBC iPlayer in June 2010. Mongrels was one of the most-requested series on BBC iPlayer during that month. Series 1 averaged 410,000 viewers overall on BBC Three. Series 1 did not make it into the BARB top 10 programmes on BBC Three any week during the time it was premiering.

The second series premiered with a double-bill of the first two episodes on 7 November 2011 at 22:30. An average of 350,000 viewers watched both episodes on BBC Three that night, less than the average of the first series.

Welsh football manager Gary Speed had died on 27 November 2011. His death was initially reported as suicide by hanging, although later investigations and inquiries found insufficient evidence to determine whether his death was intentional or accidental. Apart from the output of BBC News and BBC Sport, which began covering the aforementioned event extensively, the only other programme on the BBC channels to experience disruption was Mongrels. The episode originally scheduled to air on 28 November 2011, "Marion and the Myocardial Infarction", contained a brief scene in which Robert, a chimpanzee character and Bubbles impersonator, states that "The King of Pop died, and of course all of the Michael Jackson impersonators had no choice but to commit suicide." followed by an image implying that one of those impersonators had hanged themselves. The episode due to air the following week, "Kali and the Psychological Warfare", was even more explicit in its suicide references, depicting the human character Neil (played by Billy Seymour) attempting to hang himself, as well as Nelson contemplating suicide later in the episode, with him stating "I am a suidical person" at one point. In place of the scheduled episodes, the seventh episode of the series, "Nelson and the AMAZING Nuts", was moved up to 28 November 2011, with both "Marion and the Myocardial Infarction" and "Kali and the Psychological Warfare" being shifted back to 5 December 2011 and 12 December 2011 respectively. The change was performed about two hours prior to the episode's transmission and had come after Marion had appeared as a guest star on the Scott Mills radio show on BBC Radio 1, which had aired at 16:00 and was repeated at 18:00. An exchange during the programme continued to reference the originally-scheduled episode, including Marion quipping "There's a monkey in it" and "[Scott Mills is] in it" and Mills asking "Is that end scene staying in?" (referring to a scene during the end credits where Mills whips Robert in the Radio 1 studio). All repeats of the aforementioned episodes had also been changed to reflect the new transmission order, except for the repeat run that began prior to the premieres of the final two episodes on 19 December 2011, as well as the signed run throughout December 2011 and January 2012. Mongrels would not air as billed from 28 November up until the final two episodes premiered on 19 December. The Wales and West regions experienced further disruptions on Freeview, as the last five minutes of the replacement episode were lost due to transmission issues with the Wenvoe transmitting station. BBC iPlayer also experienced disruptions, with the previously scheduled episode ("Marion and the Myocardial Infarction") accidentally being published onto iPlayer after the transmission of "Nelson and the AMAZING Nuts". The following day, the episode was removed, and in its place the episode "Kali and the Psychological Warfare" was accidentally published and incorrectly labeled as "Episode 5" on iPlayer. This would eventually be corrected with "Nelson and the AMAZING Nuts" being published as intended. The originally billed order remains the official episode order, and is seen on both the BBC website and the Series 2 DVD release.

Subtitles and audio description were available on all episodes of Series 1, and seven episodes of Series 2 (episodes 1-4, 6, 8 and 9). The seventh episode of Series 2 had no audio description and used live subtitling on premiere. Both were rectified for future repeats. The fifth episode of Series 2 used block-based subtitles on premiere and had audio description restored. As with the seventh episode, the subtitles were rectified for future repeats.

A British Sign Language version of Series 2 premiered on 9 December 2011. All episodes aired in order during the signed run up to 23 January 2012, when the final episode, "Miquita and the Obligatory Clips Show", aired.

The final two episodes of Series 2 premiered on 19 December 2011 in a double-bill. The programme did not enter the top 10 programmes on BBC Three for the week, as with the rest of the series. The programme did, however, enter the top 10 programmes for the BBC HD channel, at number 8, with 95,000 viewers total for the double-bill. The series has yet to be repeated normally in full on UK television, as the final episode, "Miquita and the Obligatory Clips Show", was never repeated past its original transmission, with the exception of the aforementioned signed airing in January 2012.

After the signed run finished on 23 January 2012, BBC Three would not air the show again until 21 January 2016. The third episode of Series 1, "Marion the Young Lover", aired twice, once on 21 January at 22:35 and again on 22 January at 01:30. The episode "Nelson the Online Predator" was originally scheduled to air on 22 January at 02:00, but would end up not airing at that time. BBC Three closed on 16 February 2016, but continued to air programmes during the overnight hours up until the end of March. Series 1 of Mongrels, except for the episode "Destiny the Reluctant Sniffer Dog", would repeat on 5 March and 6 March 2016.

== Reception ==
The reception of Mongrels was positive, albeit with some criticism, with some considering its quality to be inconsistent, with a reviewer for tvBite.com saying that the show was "a bit hit and miss" but also that, "even the laugh-free moments have a well-written sheen." and that the work put into the jokes show. Jane Simon of the Daily Mirror wrote: "While most of it is very funny, some of the gags about Harold Shipman completely misjudge the tone. Maybe the age group BBC3 is aimed at reckon anything is fair game for comedy." The Independent's Tom Sutcliffe said that: "It does have its laughs, though, because the script isn't entirely about crass shock value", but that the sitcom, while aimed at adults, is "not really for grown-ups." Sam Wollaston of The Guardian was mainly positive about Mongrels, but said that the main reason he thought it was funny was because it depicted "cuddly children's toys [...] saying things you wouldn't normally expect cuddly children's toys to say. Like 'You are such a cock-end'", and that, "the novelty will wear off at some point not too far away".

On 18 January 2012, Dan Tetsell revealed on Twitter that Mongrels had been cancelled, saying: "we've all been sacked now". Miller posted another, longer message online saying:

Mongrels friends, it is my unbearably sad duty to announce that we will not be returning for a third series on BBC Three, a decision that has been made based on the fact that apparently you need more than two people watching a programme to make it successful. Crazy talk. I'd like to take this opportunity to thank everyone at BBC Comedy, BBC Three and BBC Worldwide who have supported us so strongly over the years, and helped us put our silly puppet show on the digital screens of the nation. I'd also like to thank, from the bottom of my heart, all the writers, cast, crew and support team who have made a horribly challenging show such an utter joy to make. This news could not be less of a reflection on your brilliant work. Most of all I'd like to thank those of you that loved watching Mongrels as much as we loved making it. It's wonderfully reassuring to think that we weren't mad after all, and that what we find funny, other people do too. I'd like to believe that there's room on television for a little show like ours; one that's not just another sitcom, one that tries to do things a bit differently and that tries to push a few boundaries here and there. Who knows, maybe we'll find a that room in the future. I hope it has a minibar. Thank you for watching. Both of you.

No official public announcement had been published by the BBC itself regarding the cancellation of the show. However, in an e-mail response to a fan complaint regarding the cancellation, the BBC had stated:

‘Mongrels’ was a funny and innovative comedy that we were proud to have on the channel but after two series we felt it was time to try something new. We regularly have to make difficult decisions about how we spend our budget and occasionally these decisions will prove unpopular with some members of the audience. There is, however, plenty of new comedy coming soon to the channel for viewers to enjoy.

== Release ==
The first series of Mongrels was released on DVD (region 2 and 4) and Blu-ray (region free) on 16 August 2010. The DVD and Blu-rays featured the unbroadcast pilot amongst their extras. A planned DVD release of the second series was cancelled. The DVD release of Series 2 was later rescheduled for October 2012, albeit with no Blu-ray counterpart and region-locked to DVD regions 2 and 4. The series was also released via iTunes shortly after airing on television. The first season was also available for purchase in SD on LoveFilm (later Amazon Instant Video, currently Amazon Prime Video) in the UK, with the second season later being made available in HD on Amazon Instant Video. Both seasons were available in HD on BBC Store from 2015 until its closure in 2017.

In the United States, the show was released on Hulu on 28 November 2011. All episodes were available to stream on Hulu until 2015. Both series, excluding the episode "Miquita and the Obligatory Clips Show", were released on Amazon Instant Video, Vudu and iTunes in the United States in 2012, and on YouTube Movies & TV in July 2013. Series 1 is still being sold as of 2026.

In Turkey, the show aired on the TV channel e2 from 12 October to 7 December 2011, with the second season airing from 6 March to 24 April 2014. This was the first airing of the show outside of the English-speaking world. The show aired with Turkish subtitles, as with most of the content on the channel. The second episode of the second series did not air on e2 for unspecified reasons.

In Canada, the first season aired on Bold from 4 August to 22 September 2011. The second season would not air. The first season is available for purchase on iTunes in Canada, with the second season, excluding the episode "Miquita and the Obligatory Clips Show", also being available until April 2026.

In New Zealand, the show aired on Choice TV in 2011.

In Australia, the show was first released on the international version of BBC iPlayer in 2011, followed by a DVD release of Series 1 in January 2013. Series 1 was also released on iTunes in Australia. Both series later aired on The Comedy Channel, with episodes airing on a weekly basis from 5 July to 25 October 2014.

In Russia, the show first released on the streaming service Tvigle as part of a licensing deal between Tvigle and BBC Worldwide. The show premiered there on 11 April 2012. The show was translated into Russian using a voice-over translation done by the voice-over studio Kubik v Kube. Episodes from the first series were released daily from 11 to 18 April 2012. The second season followed shortly after, releasing from 16 to 24 May. That same year, the TV channel 2x2 would start airing the show with a separate voice-over translation produced by the dubbing and voice-over studio Kravec-Records. 2x2 premiered the show on 16 July 2012, with all episodes premiering every weekday until 7 August 2012.

The show has never officially released in Ukraine. However, in February 2026, a Ukrainian voice-over translation of the show was released by the amateur dubbing and voice-over group SkomUA. This translation is based on the Amazon Prime Video US release, and as such, the final episode ("Miquita and the Obligatory Clips Show") has not been translated into Ukrainian. In the Ukrainian version, the setting is changed from Millwall in London to Vyhurivshchyna-Troieshchyna in Kyiv, and the time period is changed from the early-2010s to the 2020s. British pop culture references are also rewritten to refer to Ukrainian pop culture instead.

All episodes were added to Hoopla in the United States, Canada, Australia, and New Zealand in 2021. The second series was removed in 2024, and the first series was removed in 2025.

== Appearances in other programmes ==
On 13 August 2011, the cast of Mongrels took part in the BBC's Comedy Prom, in which they performed the song "Middleclass is Magical" from the seventh episode of the first series, "Marion The Superfluous Feed Character". The performance was broadcast live on BBC Radio 3, and later broadcast on television on BBC Two on 27 August 2011.

Mongrels characters Nelson and Marion appeared in the Children in Need skit Puppet Aid, which aired on BBC One on 19 November 2021. Filming took place on 7 November, exactly ten years after the second series of Mongrels first premiered. Barring repeats, this was the first time the characters had appeared on TV in nearly a decade. Rufus Jones and Dan Tetsell did not reprise their voice roles as Nelson and Marion. Instead, Nelson's performer Andy Heath and Marion's performer Warrick Brownlow-Pike provided their voices, with Brownlow-Pike stating that "We became good mimics whilst making the series." Brownlow-Pike had pitched the skit to the BBC and planned the inclusion of the characters.

=== Awards and nominations ===
Mongrels won the Royal Television Society Craft and Design Award 2009–2010 for "Production Design – Entertainment and Non-Drama" led by production designer Simon Rogers. It was also nominated for the award for "Tape and Film Editing – Entertainment and Situation Comedy" led by film editor Nigel Williams, but lost to Pete versus Life.

In 2011, Brown won the BAFTA Craft Award for "Break-through Talent". The series was nominated for the Ursa Major Award for "Best Anthropomorphic Dramatic Short Work or Series" in 2010 (series 1) and 2011 (series 2).

In 2012, Andy Heath and Iestyn Evans won the Royal Television Society Craft & Design Award for special effects in Mongrels Series 2.

== Plagiarism accusations ==
Mongrels has attracted anger from production company Fit2Fill which claimed the BBC "ripped off" their 2001 Channel 4 sitcom Pets, claiming to have received 30 emails from viewers that the two shows were similar. The producer of Pets, Andrew Barclay said: "We checked the BBC's Mongrels website this morning and the Beeb do appear to have hired the same puppet builders and puppeteers as Pets. We also notice that Mongrels' executive producer is Mark Freeland, to whom we did once pitch a Pets follow-up show."

The co-creator and co-producer of Pets, Brian West, wrote that Mongrels producer McCrum told him that Pets was not discussed during the production of Mongrels. Afterwards, Andy Heath, a puppet builder who worked for both shows, said:

Pets was Pets. Mongrels is Mongrels. If, as a viewer, you can sit down and say they are the same, then there is little point of making any new shows, if the slightest similarity (puppets and animals) can be suggested as idea stealing. I am surprised Basil Brush hasn't been on the blower, as he is a fox, and that must be a copy! Right? I worked on both, and know for a fact where they both come from. Two very different ideas.

== See also ==
- Meet the Feebles
