= PlayStation Store =

Digital media store for various consoles of the PlayStation family

- Developer: Sony Interactive Entertainment
- Type: Digital game market Online market
- Launched: November 11, 2006; 19 years ago
- Platforms: PlayStation 3 (2006–2027) (Note: First shutdown in Mexico, Honduras, and Nicaragua in August 2026 and in Saudi Arabia and the United Arab Emirates on October 5, 2026; Expected to shutdown in the rest of Latin America and Middle East in late 2026 and across all regions in July 2027); PlayStation Portable (2008–2021); PlayStation Vita/PlayStation TV (2011–2027); Web browser (2013–present); PlayStation 4 (2013–present); PlayStation App (2013–present); PlayStation 5 (2020–present)
- Website: store.playstation.com

PlayStation Store (also referred to as the PS Store) is a digital distribution service for users of Sony's PlayStation 3, PlayStation Vita/PlayStation TV, PlayStation 4 and PlayStation 5 game consoles via PlayStation Network. The PlayStation Store was previously made available on PlayStation Portable. It will shutdown for PlayStation 3 and Vita in July 2027.

The store offers a range of content both for purchase and accessible free of charge. Available content on the platform includes full games, add-on content, playable demos, themes and game/movie trailers.

== History ==
Following feedback from many PlayStation Network users, a redesigned version of PlayStation Store was launched on April 15, 2008, via a firmware update. The new design was OS based rather than the previous Store's web-based design enabling the Store to process information more quickly.

A minor update to the store was released during Sony's E3 2009 press conference. This update makes the top page rotate pictures (including their links) regularly, and changes the navigation sounds.

In September 2009, Sony made major games available to purchase on the store. These titles were later dubbed "PSN Day 1 Digital".

A major redesign of PlayStation Store was announced in September 2012, bringing a revised navigation structure and a new search system. The new store has been developed to bring game and video content together and make it easier for users to find what they are looking for. Content will be integrated into each game's listing, rather than separate categories for items like add-ons, themes, and other downloadable content. The latest design is much less text-focused and incorporates high-resolution artwork and smooth animations for featured content. The new redesign launched in Europe on October 22, 2012. Shortly after it was launched in the United Kingdom, the Store interface was reverted to the old design due to issues such as long load times and slow navigation, while other countries in Europe retained the new interface despite these issues. The redesign was released in North America on November 2, 2012. Another store redesign went live alongside the PlayStation 4's launch.

In May 2020, PlayStation Store was indefinitely suspended in China for security reasons. On March 2, 2021, Sony announced that it would discontinue offering movie and TV show purchases and rentals through PlayStation Store on August 31, 2021.

Later that month, Sony also announced that it would be closing down the storefronts for PlayStation 3, PlayStation Portable, and PlayStation Vita games in July and August 2021. Sony's decision to make many of its older games inaccessible for purchase drew criticism from many, with concerns highlighting the publisher's approach towards game preservation, as well as the limitations of digital-only media, and its potential anti-consumer implications. Several small developers who had been producing titles for the PS Vita were not forewarned by Sony of PlayStation Store's closure, requiring some to crunch to meet the deadline, while others whose games would not be ready made the decision to cancel them. As a result of the negative feedback, Sony announced on April 19, 2021, that they had reversed their decision to close the PS3 and Vita stores, leaving these available for the foreseeable future, though the PSP store still closed as originally planned on July 2, 2021. The day prior to the planned closure of the PSP store, Sony altered their plans again, and instead chose to simply disable the PlayStation Store app on the system, allowing PSP digital games to remain available for purchase on other systems.

On March 9, 2022, PlayStation announced that it suspended operations of PlayStation Store in Russia in response to the 2022 Russian invasion of Ukraine.

Players and outlets noticed that starting in March 2026, a 30-day timer appear for digitally purchased PS4 and PlayStation 5 games from the store that implied the user's system must connect to the PlayStation Network every 30 days to remain playable. Sony clarified that this is only a one-time check to validate the software, and no check is needed once validated.

On July 1, 2026, PlayStation announced that it will gradually close down the PlayStation Store on PlayStation 3 and PlayStation Vita. The process began for the PlayStation 3 store in August 2026 in Mexico, Honduras, and Nicaragua, and is set later that year in Latin American and Middle Eastern countries, with a full closure including the PlayStation Vita across all regions occurring in July 2027. In September 2026, a notice was sent out to users of Saudi Arabia and United Arab Emirates accounts, informing them that the PlayStation Store will convert the currency from USD to the local SAR and AED currencies respectively, following a maintenance period between October 5 and 8. The notice also reminded users that PlayStation Store for PS3 and PS Vita will close in the region on October 5, 2026.

== Availability ==
PlayStation Store is available in the following 69 countries and territories:

9 countries in East and Southeast Asia:

- China
- Hong Kong
- Indonesia
- Japan
- Malaysia
- Singapore
- South Korea
- Taiwan
- Thailand

18 countries in the Americas:

- Argentina*
- Bolivia*
- Brazil
- Canada
- Chile*
- Colombia*
- Costa Rica*
- Ecuador*
- El Salvador*
- Guatemala*
- Honduras*
- Mexico*
- Nicaragua*
- Panama*
- Paraguay*
- Peru*
- United States
- Uruguay*

2 countries in Oceania:

- Australia
- New Zealand

1 country in Africa:

- South Africa

10 countries in West and South Asia:

- Bahrain*
- India
- Israel
- Kuwait*
- Lebanon*
- Oman*
- Qatar*
- Saudi Arabia*
- Turkey
- United Arab Emirates*

29 countries in Europe:

- Austria
- Belgium
- Bulgaria
- Croatia
- Cyprus
- Czech Republic
- Denmark
- Finland
- France
- Germany
- Greece
- Hungary
- Iceland*
- Ireland
- Italy
- Luxembourg
- Malta
- Netherlands
- Norway
- Poland
- Portugal
- Romania
- Slovakia
- Slovenia
- Spain
- Sweden
- Switzerland
- Ukraine
- United Kingdom

'*' = Country where PlayStation Network and Store are officially available, but the Store is in Global currency (USD/EUR), not in local currency.

== Access and versions ==
The store is accessible through an icon on the XrossMediaBar on the PlayStation 3 and PlayStation Portable, via the Dynamic Menu on the PlayStation 4 and PlayStation 5, and an icon on the LiveArea on the PlayStation Vita. The service is also available online through the Sony Entertainment Network website and the PlayStation App for iOS and Android.

A master account is required to access the PlayStation Store. A log of all previously purchased items, known as "Download List", records each PlayStation Store account's complete download activity. A guest user can use their master account's Download List to download free content or to purchase content on another console; however, a single account can only be used on up to two consoles. This was previously five, but as of November 2011, Sony reduced this to two. The most recent firmware must be installed on the console to access the PlayStation Store. Each master account is associated with an online virtual "wallet" to which funds can be added. This wallet is then debited when a purchase is made from the store. Money can be added to the wallet through different systems of payment, although some of these are not available in all countries.

All purchases on the PlayStation Store are made in the user's local currency using a 'wallet' system whereby funds are added to the wallet—either in set denominations or an amount dictated by the price of the current transaction—then debited from the account's wallet when the user makes a purchase. Funds added to the PS Store are non-refundable.

The user can add funds to their wallet in a number of ways, the most common of which is by credit or debit card. Users in many regions can also purchase PlayStation Network Cards or Tickets in set denominations from retailers including supermarkets or video game stores. These funds are redeemed on the PlayStation Store when the user enters the unique 12-digit code found on the card into the PlayStation Store. Nintendo themselves later adopted this currency system for their succeeding eShop. The Store's account, however, is region-locked and generally only accepts credit card that is billed in and PlayStation Network Cards purchased from the same country selected during the registration process, which cannot be changed afterwards.

=== PlayStation 3 ===
PlayStation Store was launched on the PlayStation 3 on November 11, 2006. There are four different versions of the store on the platform: Asia, Europe (including Oceania and the Middle East), Japan and North America (including South America).

=== PlayStation Portable ===
PlayStation Store was supported on PlayStation Portable starting in October 2008 with 5.00 firmware update. The native PlayStation Store front on PSP was closed on March 31, 2016, while in-app purchases remained available after the store closed. PS Store functionality on PSP was fully closed on July 2, 2021, except for the purchased items list which still allows one to download previously purchased content or PSP content purchased from the PS3.

=== PlayStation Vita ===
PlayStation Store was launched on the PlayStation Vita on December 17, 2011, and is accessible via an icon on the LiveArea. As of December 2016, all Vita games were also made available to be downloaded digitally on the PlayStation Network via the storefront, although not all games are released physically. There are four different versions of the PlayStation Store: Asia, Europe (including Oceania and the Middle East), Japan and North America. There is no PlayStation Store localization in China and South America for the Vita.

=== PlayStation 4 ===
PlayStation 4's PlayStation Store was released on November 15, 2013, along with the console in North America, and on November 29 in most of Europe with the console two weeks following the North American launch. The PS4 version of the PS Store uses the same overall design and interface to its predecessor, the PlayStation 3's storefront; however, the color scheme has been altered to match that of the console's theme, changing from black to blue.

=== Web browser ===
In January 2013, the PlayStation Store was made available via web browsers. Users can purchase content for the PlayStation 3, PlayStation 4, PlayStation Vita, and PlayStation Portable via the online store, then download it (or put it in a download queue) via their respective devices. In October 2015, a "Wishlist" option was added. On October 15, 2020, in anticipation of the launch of the PlayStation 5, Sony announced that users would no longer be able to browse, purchase and download PS3, PSP and PS Vita content, and PS4 avatars, themes and applications via the desktop and mobile versions of PlayStation Store.

=== PlayStation 5 ===
PlayStation 5's PlayStation Store was released on November 12, 2020, along with the console in North America, Australia, New Zealand, Japan and South Korea, and on November 19, 2020, in the rest of the world (excluding China) with the console seven days following the North American and Japan launch.

== Legal issues ==
Before 2019, Sony had allowed third-party vendors, such as Amazon and Walmart, to sell video game redemption codes for PlayStation Store. Sony removed this feature in April 2019, so third-party vendors can only sell virtual currency for PlayStation Store. In May 2021, a class-action lawsuit was filed in the United States District Court for the Northern District of California alleging that because Sony maintains a monopoly on PlayStation Store, the removal of third-party sales violated antitrust laws. A second class-action lawsuit was filed the same month alleging that Sony's decision to eliminate third-party sales has led to overcharging consumers by billions of dollars.

In April 2026, it was reported that Sony had implemented dynamic pricing in the PlayStation Store, resulting in different prices for identical content based on a user's account and login status. PlayStation Support officially confirmed this practice, stating that prices are adjusted server-side during the login process.

== See also ==
- Microsoft Store
- Ubisoft+
- Nintendo eShop
- Metreon, where a physical PlayStation store was once operated
- Lists of PlayStation Store games
