= Second screen =

Use of an additional screen device

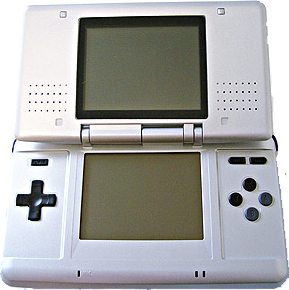
The Nintendo DS is the most famous device to use a second screen.

A second screen is a computing device used with two screens to provide complementary or interactive content. The term most commonly refers to using a smartphone or tablet computer while watching television, where the second screen displays related content such as social media discussions, polls, additional information, or interactive features synchronized with the broadcast.

Second screen technology is designed to increase audience engagement and has been found to support social television by generating online conversations around specific content. The term can also refer to multiple monitors connected to a single computer for productivity purposes.

== Analysis ==
Some studies show viewer tendencies of using another device while watching television, such as a tablet or smartphone. Other studies distinguish a higher percentage of comments or posts on social networks about the content that is being watched. Proclaimed benefits from these studies include keeping the audience engaged (via polling, chatting, providing additional information about content, and participants, etc.) and generating revenue via advertising. Second screens can be used as a metering solution to get information about the audience.

Second screen solutions can be both far-reaching and inexpensive, which has led some to think a second screen may replace people meters in the future. One factor hampering the growth of second screens is that many shows are creating their applications for them. It is considered impractical to expect users to download multiple applications and switch between them for each channel or show.

Conference and business meeting organizers may also incorporate second screens. The second screen phenomenon was described as a significant and growing trend by the "2014 Trend Tracker". "Attendees are so glued to their devices, even while watching a live presentation (or at home, on television) that marketers are supplying them with a simultaneous engagement tool they can access on that device," says Robin Stanley, VP-design and creative at GES. "Software tools allow conference session presenters to share slides and presentations in real-time, so attendees can follow on with their device in hand." Second screen technology at conferences allows conference attendees to engage with the speaker and other participants.

== Applications ==
Many applications designed for the second screen give another form of interactivity to the user and another way to sell advertising content. Second screening may also involve applications not formally connected to the primary entertainment. Some examples include:

- TV programs broadcasting live tweets and comments.
- Synchronization of audio-visual content via web advertising.
- Applications that extend the content information, whether news, weather, or chat, to another screen.
- Remote workers, as business travelers, can set up their working space anywhere to attend meetings and manage projects.
- Shows that add content exclusively for the second screen to their websites.
- Applications that synchronize the content being viewed to the mobile device.
- Video game consoles playing with extra data, such as map or strategy data, that synchronize with the content being viewed on the portable device, such as the Wii U. PlayStation also has a game accessibility feature called "Chat Transcription", which allows a user to read what others say and send text to speech messages through the PlayStation 4's Google Play App named "PlayStation Second Screen".
- TV discovery application with recommendations, electronic programming guides (live content), and personalization.
- Applications that display polling results and audience-triggered animated emoticons (along with the sender's name and location) in real-time on the broadcast instead of the user's second screen.
- Voting functionality for audiences at home via the broadcaster app.
- Video games that use mobile phones for interaction – examples include Kahoot!, The Jackbox Party Pack series of games, and Everybody 1-2-Switch!. The Nintendo switch online app also allows users to utilise their phone as a second screen for a variety of different games, including the use of "Zelda Notes" in The Legend of Zelda: Tears of the Kingdom and the Switch 2 edition of Breath of the Wild.
- For the Nintendo DS and Nintendo 3DS, Big Brain Academy uses the second screen format for answering questions given by Dr. Ryuta Kawashima.

== Sports broadcasting ==
Sports broadcasters, to stem the flight of the audience away from watching the main screen (the television) to the second screen, are offering alternative content to the main program, such as unseen moments, alternative information, soundtracks, and characters. Proposed new technologies allow the viewer to see different camera angles while watching the game.

TV2 (Denmark), Denmark's largest commercial TV channel, synchronized its Second Screen service with the live broadcast of the Giro d'Italia cycling race from May 5 to May 27, 2012. Viewers on all internet devices could get rider stats, biographies, news, stage reviews, city information, weather updates, and more. Viewers scanned a QR code on the TV broadcast to get connected to the service or typed in a short URL.

In the US, HDNet Fights utilizes a service that synchronizes with live MMA broadcasts. Viewers on smartphones and tablets can get stats, vote on fights and rounds, chat, win prizes, and see how fellow second-screen users voted on fight outcomes.

== Other television ==
Slate described popular procedural dramas like Suits as examples of "second-screen content—shows that don't require viewers to hit rewind if they idly drift off while scrolling their phones". The Hollywood Reporter described the Jennifer Lopez film Atlas as "another Netflix movie to half-watch while doing laundry". John Landgraf of FX Networks bragged that, by contrast, Shogun was "not a two-screen show". Justine Bateman said to The Hollywood Reporter in 2023, that "the viewer's primary screen is their phone and the laptop and they don't want anything on your show to distract them from their primary screen because if they get distracted, they might look up, be confused, and go turn it off. I heard somebody use this term before: they want a 'visual muzak.'" In 2025, Netflix reportedly told screenwriters to have characters announce actions, so those watching the streaming service in the background while doing something else know what is happening.

== Examples ==
Primary screen	Second screen
Ares Interactive Media	iOS, Android, Windows, Mac, Linux
Dreamcast	VMU
Select Dish Network Receivers	iOS and Android devices using Dish Anywhere Mobile App
Select Disney Blu-ray discs and DVDs	iPad and devices running Adobe Flash using Disney Second Screen
GameCube	Game Boy Advance using Nintendo GameCube – Game Boy Advance link cable
Nintendo Switch 2	GameShare
PlayStation 3	PlayStation Portable and PlayStation Vita using Remote Play
PlayStation 4	PlayStation Vita using Remote Play; iOS and Android devices using the PlayStation App
PlayStation 5	PlayStation Portal
Wii	Nintendo DS
Wii U	Wii U GamePad and Nintendo 3DS
Xbox 360	Windows 8, Windows Phone, iOS, and Android devices using Xbox SmartGlass
Xbox One	Windows 8, Windows Phone, iOS, and Android devices using Xbox SmartGlass Windows 10 PCs using an Xbox App

== See also ==
- Enhanced TV
- Smart TV
- Automatic content recognition
- Real-time communication
