= List of Mongrels episodes =

Mongrels, formerly known under the working titles of We Are Mongrels and The Un-Natural World, is a British puppet-based situation comedy series first broadcast on BBC Three between 22 June and 10 August 2010, with a making-of documentary entitled "Mongrels Uncovered" broadcast on 11 August 2010. The series revolves around the lives of five anthropomorphic animals who hang around the back of a pub in the Isle of Dogs, London. The characters are Nelson, a metrosexual fox (voiced by Rufus Jones, performed by Andy Heath); Destiny, an Afghan Hound (voiced by Lucy Montgomery, performed by Richard Coombs); Marion, a "borderline-retarded" cat (voiced by Dan Tetsell, performed by Warrick Brownlow-Pike); Kali, a grudge-bearing pigeon (voiced by Katy Brand, performed by Iestyn Evans); and Vince, a sociopathic foul-mouthed fox (voiced by Paul Kaye, performed by various puppeteers).

Mongrels originally began as an unbroadcast pilot when it was known as We Are Mongrels. Differences between the pilot and the series included a different voice actor and puppet to portray Marion (Ray Panthaki), Destiny and Kali are also portrayed by different puppets, Vince doesn't swear constantly and the appearance of a sixth character, Debbie the suicidal chicken, who was eventually dropped from the show. Following from this pilot a full series was commissioned.

The first series consisted of eight episodes and the making-of special. A second series was also commissioned. On 18 January 2012 it was announced via Twitter that Mongrels had not been renewed for a third series by the BBC. The series was created and directed by Adam Miller. The producer for the series is Stephen McCrum.

== Series overview ==
Season	Episodes	Originally released		DVD release	Blu-ray release
Season	Episodes	First released	Last released	DVD release	Blu-ray release
1	8	June 22, 2010	August 10, 2010	16 August 2010	16 August 2010
2	9	7 November 2011	19 December 2011	10 October 2012	N/A

== Episode list ==
=== Series 1 (2010) ===
No. overall	No. in series	Title	Directed by	Written by	Original release date	UK viewers (millions)
1	1	"Nelson the Online Predator"	Adam Miller	Daniel Peak, Jon Brown	22 June 2010	N/A
Nelson discovers the harsh reality of interspecies dating, Marion gets himself adopted after his previous owner dies, Destiny bites her owner so she can attend dog obedience classes and Kali implicates DJ Toby Anstis in one of her evil schemes. Guest star: Toby Anstis Song: F*** Chickens
2	2	"Destiny the Reluctant Sniffer Dog"	Adam Miller	Jon Brown	29 June 2010	N/A
Destiny learns of the power of bottom-sniffing, Kali is reunited with an old partner in crime, Nelson adopts one of Vince's cubs and Marion overdoses on catnip. Guest star: Christopher Biggins, Gemma Bissix, Stuart Manning, Paul Ross Song: What Kind Of God?
3	3	"Marion the Young Lover"	Adam Miller	Jon Brown	6 July 2010	0.41 (BBC Three)
Springwatch comes to film on the Isle of Dogs and Nelson is horrified to discover all the animals are, in fact, actors. Destiny becomes a guide dog, Marion attempts to win love by staying alive for one more day, and Kali reveals she used to nest in Amy Winehouse's hair. Guest star: Terry Nutkins, Chris Packham Song: What A Difference A Day Makes
4	4	"Nelson the Stroke Virgin"	Adam Miller	Jon Brown	13 July 2010	N/A
Destiny enjoys a taste of life in the limelight after being awarded Animal of Courage 2010, but it is Marion who is the real hero. Nelson tries to be stroked by a human and Kali develops a crush on a crow that turns out to be female. Guest star: Clive Anderson, Jeff Brazier Song: Everybody Loves A Lesbian
5	5	"Kali the Genetic Engineer"	Adam Miller	Jon Brown	20 July 2010	N/A
Nelson's French penfriend Christian arrives for a visit, but brings rabies with him. Destiny discovers that her new boyfriend is a pimp organised by her owner Gary to get her to produce pups. When Kali is caught up in a pigeon cull, she resolves to take revenge on humankind. Guest star: Scott Mills Song: My Destiny
6	6	"Destiny the Infection Risk"	Adam Miller	Jon Brown	27 July 2010	N/A
Nelson falls in love with Sandra, a mangy, flea-ridden fox whom he meets at the rubbish tip while rescuing Marion. Gary angers Kali after he erects anti-pigeon spikes on the pub walls, but Destiny is overjoyed when he enters her into a competition. Guest star: Christopher Hughes Song: Breaking Up Is Such A Faff
7	7	"Marion the Superfluous Feed Character"	Adam Miller	Jon Brown	3 August 2010	N/A
Nelson organises a rooftop picnic to celebrate Vince's birthday, but things go badly wrong when an accident with a party popper puts Vince in a coma. Meanwhile, Destiny tries dating a bossy sheepdog and Kali plots her revenge on Harry Hill after seeing her mum getting electrocuted on You've Been Framed. Guest star: Vicki Butler-Henderson Song: Middleclass is Magical
8	8	"Nelson the Naughty Arsonist"	Adam Miller	Jon Brown	10 August 2010	N/A
It's the worst time of the year for the animals - Bonfire Night (aka 5/11). After failing in his job last year as a fire warden, Nelson faces an angry mob led by Marion demanding an end to the event for good. Kali has her wings clipped and discovers she is suddenly an easy meal for Vince. Destiny decides to pursue a modelling career. Guest star: Eamonn Holmes Song: Beautiful

=== Series 2 (2011) ===
No. overall	No. in series	Title	Directed by	Written by	Original release date	UK viewers (millions)
9	1	"Marion and the Force-Field"	Adam Miller	Jon Brown	7 November 2011	0.34 (BBC Three); 0.17 (BBC HD)
Celebrity guests: N/A Song: Just A Little Tap On The Nose
10	2	"Kali and the Rickshaw Inferno"	Adam Miller	Jon Brown	7 November 2011	0.32 (BBC Three); 0.17 (BBC HD)
Celebrity guests: Ainsley Harriott, Richard O'Brien, Russell Tovey Song: Die Evil Zombies
11	3	"Destiny and the V.E.T.S"	Adam Miller	Jon Brown	14 November 2011	0.37 (BBC Three)
Celebrity guests: Zoë Ball (as Zoe Ball), Danny Dyer Song: Immigration Rag
12	4	"Nelson and the C***'s Speech"	Adam Miller	Jon Brown, Dan Tetsell	21 November 2011	0.33 (BBC Three)
Nelson's thrilled to be best man. All he has to do is say one nice thing about Vince. Celebrity guests: N/A Song: Vince Is A Massive C***
13	5	"Marion and the Myocardial Infarction"	Adam Miller	Daniel Peak	5 December 2011	0.42 (BBC Three); 0.16 (BBC HD)
Kali seeks revenge when her put-downs are outclassed by Destiny's bitchy new friend. Celebrity guests: Scott Mills, Natasha Hamilton Song: I'm Gonna Murder Justin Bieber
14	6	"Kali and the Psychological Warfare"	Adam Miller	Daniel Peak	12 December 2011	0.37 (BBC Three)
Kali embarks on a campaign of psychological warfare against Vanessa Feltz. Celebrity guests: Anthea Turner, Vanessa Feltz Song: Smoking Makes You Look Cool
15	7	"Nelson and the AMAZING Nuts"	Adam Miller	Jon Brown	28 November 2011 (Note: Following the death of Gary Speed the previous day, episode 7 was hastily broadcast in place of episode 5 as it contained a reference to suicide by hanging, as did episode 6. BBC iPlayer and Sky onscreen information retained the correct and intended episode order.)	0.39 (BBC Three); 0.14 (BBC HD)
Marion becomes a YouTube sensation after getting his head stuck in a car tyre. Celebrity guest: Christian Jessen Song: No-one's Been Stabbed Here Since Friday
16	8	"Vince and the Helpful Horse"	Adam Miller	Jon Brown, Daniel Peak	19 December 2011	0.37 (BBC Three); 0.09 (BBC HD)
Nelson and the gang must solve the mystery of what-the-hell happened on New Year's Eve. Celebrity guest: Lembit Öpik Song: Shit House Party
17	9	"Miquita and the Obligatory Clips Show"	Adam Miller	Jon Brown	19 December 2011	0.32 (BBC Three); 0.09 (BBC HD)
Miquita Oliver presents this clip show in this hilarious celebration of Mongrels. Celebrity guests: Miquita Oliver, Will Mellor Song: Montage of previous songs, F*** Chickens (signed version)
