= PlayStation Network =

Online multiplayer gaming and digital media delivery service

- Developer: Sony Interactive Entertainment
- Type: Online service
- Launched: November 11, 2006; 20 years ago
- Platforms: PlayStation 3 (2006–present); PlayStation Portable (2008–present); PlayStation Vita/PlayStation TV (2011–present); Web browser (2013–present); PlayStation 4 (2013–present); PlayStation App (2013–present); PlayStation 5 (2020–present); PlayStation Portal (2025–present)
- Status: Active
- Members: 127 million active monthly (As of September 30, 2026)
- Pricing model: Free for PlayStation Network; Monthly subscription for PlayStation Plus
- Website: Official website

The PlayStation Network (PSN) is a digital media entertainment service provided by Sony Interactive Entertainment. Launched in November 2006, PSN was originally conceived for the PlayStation video game consoles, but extended to encompass smartphones, tablets, Blu-ray players and high-definition televisions. It succeeded Sony Entertainment Network in 2015 and this service is the account for PlayStation consoles, which accounts can store games and other content.

PlayStation Network's services are dedicated to an online marketplace (PlayStation Store), a premium subscription service for enhanced gaming and social features (PlayStation Plus), music streaming (PlayStation Music, based on Spotify), and formerly, a cloud gaming service (PlayStation Now; folded into PlayStation Plus Premium in June 2022). The service is available in 73 countries and territories.

== History ==
Launched in the year 2000, Sony's second home console, the PlayStation 2, had rudimentary online features in select games via its online networks. It required a network adaptor, which was available as an add-on for original models and integrated into the hardware on slimline models. However, Sony provided no unified service for the system, so support for network features was specific to each game and third-party server, and there was no interoperability of cross-game presence. Five years later during the development stage for its third home console, the PlayStation 3, Sony expressed their intent to build upon the functionality of its predecessor by creating a new interconnected service that keeps users constantly in touch with a "PlayStation World" network. In March 2006, Sony officially introduced its unified online service, tentatively named "PlayStation Network Platform". A list of supporting features was announced at the Tokyo Game Show later the same year.

Sony launched an optional premium subscription service on top of the free PSN service in June 2010. Known as PlayStation Plus, the system provides access to exclusive content, complementary games, regular store discounts, and early access to forthcoming games.

Following a security intrusion, the PlayStation Network had a temporary suspension of operation which began on April 20, 2011, and affected 77 million registered accounts. Lasting 23 days, this outage was the longest amount of time the PSN had been offline since its inception in 2006. Sony reported that user data had been obtained during the intrusion. In June 2011, Sony launched a "Welcome Back" program following the outage, allowing all PSN subscribers who joined before April 20 to download two free PlayStation 3 titles and two free PlayStation Portable games. Users also received 30 free days of PlayStation Plus, while users who were already subscribed before the outage got 60 free days. After the disruption, Sony changed the PlayStation Network's license agreement to legally bar users from filing lawsuits and joining class action lawsuits without first trying to resolve issues with an arbitrator.

The PlayStation Network was now run by both Sony Computer Entertainment and Sony Network Entertainment International. From February 8, 2012, PSN accounts were converted into Sony Entertainment Network accounts, which had been newly launched, to be used with all other online media services offered by the Sony Entertainment Network.

In July 2012, Sony Computer Entertainment announced that it had acquired video game streaming service Gaikai for $380 million. The acquisition was later strengthened when Sony acquired the assets of Gaikai's market rival OnLive. At the Consumer Electronics Show in January 2014, Sony announced that Gaikai's technology would be used to power PlayStation Now, a new cloud-based gaming service that allows people to play PlayStation games on a variety of devices. During 2014, Sony rolled out the service in North America on PlayStation 3 and PlayStation 4 in beta form as a means for users to test performance and pricing structures.

On December 25, 2014, PlayStation Network and Xbox Live suffered a network disruption after a denial-of-service attack. Both services were flooded with millions of inauthentic connection requests, making it hard for genuine users to establish a connection. Functionality was restored on December 26, with some users experiencing difficulties in the days that followed. On January 1, 2015, Sony announced that users would be compensated for the downtime with a five-day extension to PlayStation Plus memberships.

Formerly the gaming provision of the much broader Sony Entertainment Network, the PlayStation Network became Sony's premier entertainment service in 2015, unifying games, music, television and video. While synonymous with gaming, Sony said the PlayStation Network had evolved to become a "comprehensive digital entertainment brand".

In April 2024, Sony announced that it would begin to offer PSN features on PlayStation Studios-published games for Microsoft Windows (the Xbox Studios-published games), beginning with Ghost of Tsushima Director's Cut; the game will offer optional PSN integration, including an overlay with access to social features and Trophies.

On October 1, 2024, the PlayStation Network had a global outage that suspended all of its services for all users for seven hours. Sony Interactive Entertainment never disclosed the reason for the outage. Another global outage occurred on February 8, 2025, that suspended all of its services for almost twenty-four hours, making it the second such incident to occur within six months. Sony offered an apology and compensation for affected gamers, but this offer was criticised.

In March 2026, it was reported that Sony would be phasing out "PlayStation Network" and "PSN" from its branding by September 2026. According to Insider Gaming, an email sent to developers said the change would be "purely visual" and that the intention is to "properly capture the breadth of our evolving digital services."

== Availability ==
Countries supported by PlayStation Network (as of March 2025): Available Available region on the PlayStation website, but not a supported region in PlayStation Network (the Philippines and Vietnam) Suspended by Sony (Russia) Unavailable

PlayStation Network is available in every country and territory except in North Korea, Philippines, Russia and Vietnam.

On March 9, 2022, PlayStation announced that it suspended operations of PlayStation Network and PlayStation Store in Russia in response to the 2022 Russian invasion of Ukraine.

== Features ==
Signing up for the PlayStation Network is free of monetary cost. Two types of accounts can be created: Master accounts and Sub accounts. A master account allows full access to all settings, including parental controls. Sub accounts can subsequently be created (e.g. for children) with desired restrictions set by the master account holder. A sub-account holder has the option to upgrade their account once they reach 18 years of age. Sony encourages registrants to use a unique email and a strong password not associated with other online services.

=== Online ID ===
An Online ID is one's username on the PlayStation Network, which is displayed when playing online games and using other network features. It can range from 3 to 16 characters in length and consist of letters, numbers, hyphens and underscores. Beginning in 2019, users may change their PlayStation Network ID for a fee.

Users have the option to disclose their real name aside from their Online ID, add a personal description, exhibit a profile picture or avatar, and list all spoken languages. Profiles also include a summary of a player's Trophy level and recent activity. Profiles can be viewed via the user interface or online through the PlayStation website.

A Portable ID is a small infographic intended for use as a forum signature. The graphic showcases a user's trophy level and number of trophies awarded. Each user can log into their PSN account using a web browser to access and customize their Portable ID, and is then given a unique URL which they can cut & paste to display their ID elsewhere on the internet.

=== Trophies ===
Trophies are in-game awards presented to gamers for hitting specific targets or reaching certain milestones, such as completing a difficult level or defeating a certain number of enemies. There are four different types of trophies awarded: a bronze, silver, or gold trophy is contingent upon the difficulty of the accomplishment, with each reward contributing to a level system attached to a player's profile. A platinum trophy is awarded to the player once they unlock all other trophies in the base game; smaller-sized games, however, generally do not offer a platinum trophy. In addition, each trophy is graded by rarity—common, rare, very rare, and ultra rare—based on the percentage of people who have unlocked it. Developers can choose to make various trophies hidden so that their value and description are not revealed until after the user has obtained them.

In an effort to discourage cheating in terms of how soon Trophies are awarded, the PlayStation Network requires consoles to maintain an accurate time and date setting before a digitally downloaded game can be started, which also extends to virtually all physically released software for the PS4 and certain physical games for the PS5. Without a connection to PlayStation Network, consoles would rely on a CMOS battery to maintain the date and time. If a console is unable to obtain an accurate date and time from PlayStation Network due to loss of connectivity and CMOS battery charge combined, games can be rendered unplayable on it, leading critics to decry this anti-cheat system as a form of always-on DRM and a threat to video game preservation. Upon discovery of this issue, known as the C-bomb, several months after the PlayStation 5's launch, as Sony was contemplating an equally controversial decision to shut down the PlayStation Store for previously discontinued systems that used it. In late September 2021, Sony resolved the C-bomb issue for the PS4 with firmware update 9.0.0, so that an inability to obtain an accurate date and time from PSN would only disable time-stamping of Trophies instead of blocking startup of games. Sony later resolved the same issue for the PlayStation 5 in November, allowing all physical and digital PS4 and PS5 games to run without any need for an accurate date and time reading from PSN, except for PlayStation Plus games, which require online verification to access them.

=== Usage in Microsoft Windows games ===
Starting around 2020, Sony began releasing ports of its first-party games for Microsoft Windows computers. After the release of Helldivers 2 in 2024, Sony added a requirement that users must use a free PlayStation Network account to play the game, which was met with criticism online as PSN availability was limited to a select number of regions, rendering the game unplayable for many. While Sony reversed this decision later, several of the Windows ports that followed included the PSN requirement, including for single-player games such as God of War Ragnarök and Horizon Zero Dawn Remastered. Sony changed this practice in January 2025, committing to releasing the PSN requirement as only optional and will work to remove the requirement from previously released games, whilst offering an incentive to players using a PSN account to register within the game, tracking trophies and friends, and to receive in-game rewards.

== PlayStation Plus ==
PlayStation Plus
- Developer: Sony Interactive Entertainment
- Type: Premium online service
- Launched: June 29, 2010
- Last updated: June 13, 2022 (North America)
- Platforms: PlayStation 4 PlayStation 5 PlayStation Portal
- Members: 47.4 million (as of March 31, 2023)
- Website: Official website

PlayStation Plus (PS Plus) is a paid tiered subscription service that provides users with access to premium features. These features include access to online multiplayer, exclusive discounts on the PlayStation Store, the ability to upload up to 100 GB of saved game files to PlayStation servers, and three games available to download each month. These features are available to all subscribers. The "Extra" tier provides access to a wide catalogue of 400+ PlayStation 4 and PlayStation 5 games. Moreover, the "Extra" tier also unlocks a catalogue of Ubisoft+ classics. The "Premium" (also known as "Deluxe") tier adds access to downloadable PlayStation, PlayStation 2, and PlayStation Portable games, access to limited trials of select games, and (in some regions) the ability to cloud stream certain PlayStation, PS2, PS3, PS4, PS5 and PSP games. For all tiers of subscription, users can choose between monthly, quarterly, or annual payments.

Furthermore, all PS Plus tiers have the Game Help feature, a PlayStation 5 exclusive that provides spoiler-free hints and tips while playing supported games. Game Help can range from a nudge in the right direction to a full video walkthrough which can be pinned to the side of the screen to refer to while playing.

=== Monthly games ===
Membership includes access to a rotating selection of games, with the selection varying based on PlayStation Store region. New titles are announced every month, to be downloaded immediately or added to a library for later access, before being replaced by a new selection of games. Members can keep all games in their library as long as they remain a member of PlayStation Plus. If their membership lapses, these games will become inaccessible. Once membership is renewed, the games will become unlocked again. In late June 2020, it was announced that PS Plus would expand its capacity of accessible games from two to three for its 10th anniversary.

=== PlayStation Plus Collection ===
In September 2020, Sony announced during its next-generation showcase that PlayStation Plus members who purchase a PlayStation 5 would also get access to a collection of "games that defined the generation" games from the PlayStation 4. In May 2023, the collection was removed. The PlayStation Plus collection included:

- Batman: Arkham Knight
- Battlefield 1
- Bloodborne
- Call of Duty: Black Ops III – Zombies Chronicles Edition
- Crash Bandicoot N. Sane Trilogy
- Detroit: Become Human
- Days Gone
- Fallout 4
- Final Fantasy XV Royal Edition
- God of War
- Infamous Second Son
- The Last Guardian
- The Last of Us Remastered
- Monster Hunter: World
- Mortal Kombat X
- Persona 5 (Removed May 2022)
- Ratchet & Clank
- Resident Evil 7: Biohazard
- Uncharted 4: A Thief's End
- Until Dawn

=== 2022 update ===
On December 3, 2021, Bloomberg reported that Sony was working on a new subscription service codenamed "Spartacus" that would be a merger of the company's current services, PlayStation Plus and PlayStation Now, with the company reportedly set to keep the Plus branding. The service was reported as including three tiers, the first including all the benefits of PlayStation Plus, the second expanding upon the first by including a catalog of PlayStation 4 and PlayStation 5 titles, and the third expanding upon the first two by including demos as well as a catalog of games from the PlayStation, PlayStation 2, PlayStation 3, and PlayStation Portable. Bloomberg claimed the service would launch in early 2022 and compete with Microsoft's Xbox Game Pass service.

The updated PlayStation Plus service with a three-tier subscription model was officially confirmed by Sony in March 2022 as launching in June 2022; the new service launched first in Asian territories excluding Japan on May 23, 2022, in Japan on June 1, 2022, in North America on June 13, 2022, and in Europe on June 22, 2022.

The existing service became PlayStation Plus Essential. PlayStation Plus Extra additionally gives the user access to up to 400 PS4 and PS5 games as downloadable titles, and PlayStation Plus Premium further adds access to up to 340 games from the PlayStation, PS2, PS3, and PSP, streaming of all games mentioned above, and download of all but the PS3 games. For markets without cloud streaming, Sony offers an alternate version of Premium called PlayStation Plus Deluxe that includes the benefits of Premium at a discounted rate without cloud streaming or PS3 games.

== PlayStation Store ==
The PlayStation Store is a digital media shop that offers a range of downloadable content both for purchase and available free of charge. This includes full games, free-to-play games, add-ons, demos, music, movies and background themes. The store accepts physical currency, PayPal transfers and prepaid network cards.

PlayStation Network Cards are a form of electronic money that can be used with the PlayStation Store. Each card contains an alphanumeric code which can be entered on the PlayStation Network to deposit credit in a virtual wallet. Sony devised the payment method for people without access to a credit card and PlayStation owners who would like to send or receive such cards as gifts.

In 2012 Sony introduced a cross-buy initiative whereby a game available for multiple PlayStation devices needed only to be purchased once. Players who download the PlayStation 3 version of a game can transfer to the PlayStation Vita or PlayStation 4 version at no extra cost, and vice versa. Users have immediate access to supported titles in their digital game library, even when they upgrade to the newest system. The initiative was later extended to include PlayStation 5.

== PlayStation Blog ==
The PlayStation Blog is an online PlayStation-focused gaming blog which is part of the PlayStation Network. Launched in June 2007, regular content includes game announcements, developer interviews and store updates. A sub-site of the blog called PlayStation. Blog Share was launched in March 2010 and allows PSN users to submit ideas to the PlayStation team about anything PlayStation-related as well as vote on the ideas of other submissions.

== Original programming ==
Beginning in the spring of 2015, PlayStation Network began to produce and distribute its own original content. The first original scripted program, Powers, premiered on March 10, 2015, and ran for two full seasons. The series was cancelled on August 3, 2016.

In June 2017, it was announced that Sony was launching the Emerging Filmmakers Program where members of the public can submit pitches for potential television series to be aired on PlayStation Network. Submissions were due on August 1, 2017, and five of the ideas would be turned into pilot episodes that will be voted on by the PlayStation community.

== Change to terms and conditions ==
A change to the PSN terms and conditions announced on September 15, 2011, required users to agree to give up their right (to join as a group in a class action) to sue Sony over any future security breach, without first trying to resolve legal issues with an arbitrator. This included any ongoing class action suits initiated before August 20, 2011.

Another clause, which removed a user's right to trial by jury should the user opt out of the clause (by sending a letter to Sony), says:

If the Class Action Waiver clause is found to be illegal or unenforceable, this entire Section 15 will be unenforceable, and the dispute will be decided by a court and you and the Sony Entity you have a dispute with each agree to waive in that instance, to the fullest extent allowed by law, any trial by jury.

Sony guaranteed that a court of law in the respective country, in this case the US, would hold jurisdiction regarding any rules or changes in the Sony PSN ToS:

These Terms of Service and all questions relating to the performance, interpretation, breach or enforcement of these Terms of Service, or the rights, obligations and liabilities of you and us under them are governed by the laws of the State of California. You agree that all disputes, claims or litigation arising from or related in any way to these Terms of Service and our relationship with you will be litigated only in a court of competent jurisdiction located in San Mateo County, State of California. You agree to be subject to personal jurisdiction and venue in that location.

== See also ==
- List of PlayStation applications
- Nintendo Switch Online
- Xbox network
