= PlayStation App =

Mobile companion app for PlayStation consoles

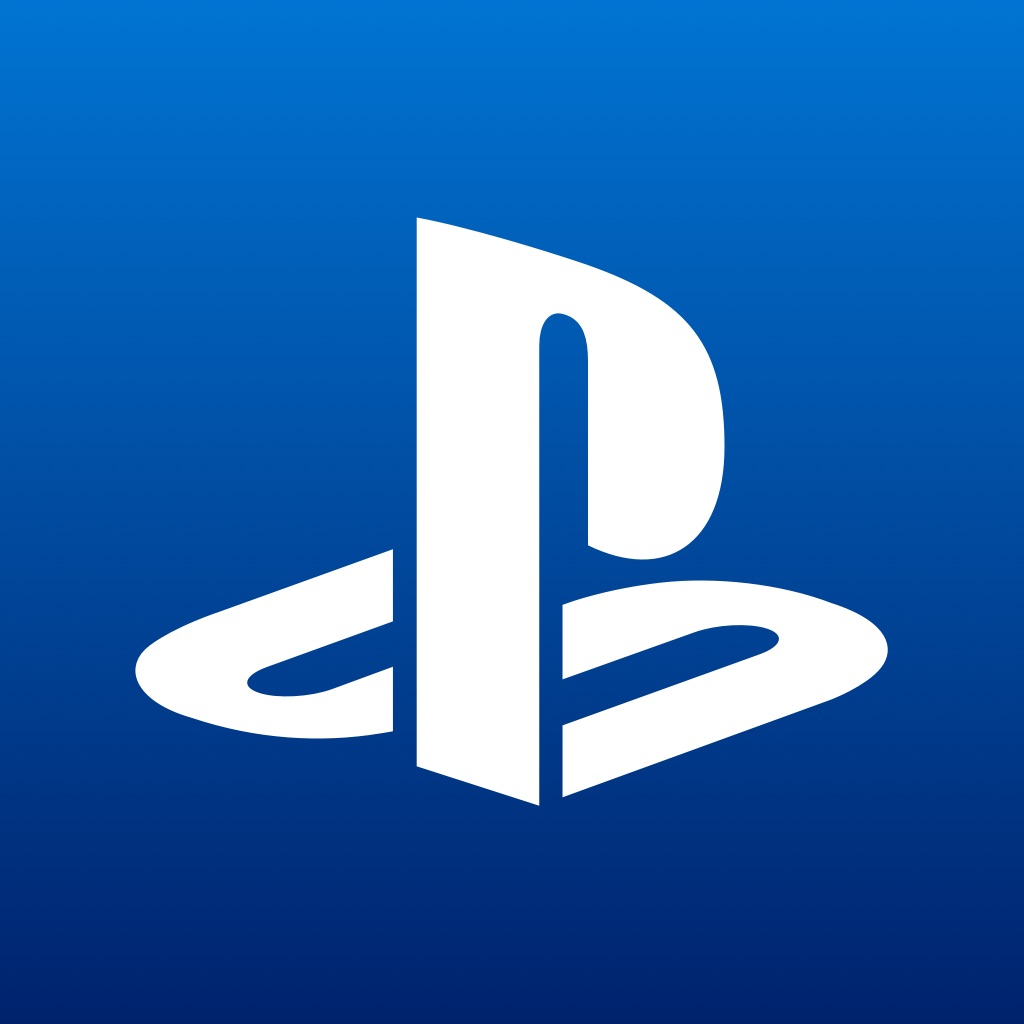
- Developer: PlayStation Mobile Inc.
- Release: January 11, 2011 (EU only); November 15, 2013 (Worldwide)
Stable release
- iOS: 23.11.0 / November 16, 2023; 2 years ago
- Android: 23.11.3 / January 10, 2024; 2 years ago
- Operating system: iOS, Android
- Available in: English, Czech, Danish, Dutch, Finnish, French, German, Greek, Italian, Norwegian, Polish, Portuguese, Russian, Spanish, Swedish, Turkish, Romanian
- Type: Entertainment
- Website: www.playstation.com/playstation-app/

The PlayStation App is a software application for iOS and Android devices developed by PlayStation Mobile Inc. It serves as a companion app for PlayStation video game consoles, granting access to PlayStation Network community features and remote control.

== Features ==
The application allows users to:

- View which friends are online and what they are playing.
- Receive notifications, game alerts, and invitations.
- Customize PSN profile.
- View progress and compare trophies.
- Keep up with the latest activities from friends and following players.
- Get games and add-ons at PlayStation Store, and send remote requests to PS4 to download in background.
- Send messages to other PlayStation Network members and participate in PlayStation parties.

Sony has additionally developed other applications to complement the primary app, such as PlayStation Messages for exchanging messages with PSN users, PlayStation Communities to view PS4 communities and PS4 Second Screen, to use the device as a second screen companion on select PS4 games as well as an on-screen keyboard for quick and easy typing.

== Update history ==
The app was first launched exclusively in European markets on January 11, 2011, and included access to PSN trophies and friends, as well as the PS Blog and information about upcoming games.

With the launch of the PS4 in North America on November 15, 2013, the app got a revamp and became available worldwide. Version 1.70 was released on April 30, 2014, adding notifications, friend request links and custom profile pictures. Version 2.00 was released on October 27, 2014, adding tablet support. Version 2.50 released on March 26, 2015, added accessibility options. Version 3.00 released on September 30, 2015, added events and guest log in. Version 3.10 added the ability to follow verified players and the messaging portion was spun off into its own app. Version 3.50 added the ability to create events. 4.00 allowed users to change their PSN avatar right from the app. A new app, PlayStation Communities was released on November 29, 2016.

The PlayStation App was completely redesigned on November 7, 2017, with improved load times. The second screen functionality was spun off into its own app and the ability to view live broadcasts and remove trophy lists with a completion rate of 0% were removed.

The PlayStation App was completely redesigned again on October 28, 2020, with options for launching games remotely, managing storage, and signing into a console. Users could purchase and download games straight to their PlayStation 4 or PlayStation 5.

== See also ==
- Xbox (app)
- List of PlayStation applications
