= Smart.fm =

- Website type: Social Learning, Language Learning, General Learning
- Available in: Includes Japanese, Korean, English
- Creators: Cerego Japan, Inc.
- Key people: Paul Greenberg, CEO; Andrew Smith Lewis, Chairman
- Website: http://www.smart.fm/
- Commercial: Yes
- Registration: Free
- Current status: Closed

Smart.fm (formerly iKnow!) was a social learning- and community website created by Cerego Japan, Inc. The website used spaced repetition algorithms (SRS) to assist users in committing facts to long term memory and increasing learning speed. Users could create, manage and share lists of facts to memorize; as well as learn a number of languages. The data was used to automatically plan a curriculum and learning strategy for the users. In addition to the website base, Smart.fm also had a Facebook application.

== History ==
Smart.fm was created by Japan-based company Cerego Japan, Inc., initially featuring language-learning and branded under the name iKnow! (iKnow.co.jp). The original platform focused on English learners in Japan. On November 24, 2008 the platform turned to world-wide audience when it added another 188 languages. The upgrade also included tools for users to create learning content; sample sentences and timed tests. Cerego had raised US$20 million in funding at the time and was staffed by 22 employees.

The site's name was changed to Smart.fm on March 5, 2009 when the platform introduced an upgrade which enabled users to add learning content of any kind. The re-branding was sudden, and users complained about the new interface and new name. About the new name, Cerego's Russell Moench explained in an official announcement: "we see ourselves more like your personal learning station than an online classroom or teacher or textbook."

== Technology ==
Cerego's Smart.fm used spaced repetition techniques to assist users in organizing learning content, increase learning speed and improve recollection. The system was based on established methods of learning derived from cognitive- and neuroscience research; continuously analyzing performance, on a long- and short-term basis, making dynamic adjustments to learning exercises. The data was used to automatically plan a curriculum and learning strategy for the users.

== Closure ==
On January 27, 2011, Cerego Japan, Inc. announced the planned closure of the Smart.fm free service for March 31, 2011. The Smart.fm service has since been replaced with Cerego's paid subscription-based language learning site, iKnow!
