= Xbox (app) =

Software

- Screenshot of the Xbox app on Windows 11
- Developer: Xbox (Microsoft)

Stable release(s) [±]
- Windows: July 2026 Update (2607.1001.20) / July 14, 2026; 9 days ago
- Android: 2512.1.5 / December 8, 2025; 7 months ago
- iOS (Note: Including iPadOS and visionOS): 2607.1.1 / July 13, 2026; 10 days ago
- Operating system: Windows 10, 11; Android; iOS 15+ (Note: Including iPadOS); visionOS 1+; Tizen
- Predecessor: Games for Windows – Live; Xbox Games
- Website: www.xbox.com/en-US/xbox-on-pc (PC); www.xbox.com/en-US/apps/xbox-app-on-mobile (Mobile)

The Xbox app (stylized as XBOX) is an application developed by Microsoft's Xbox division. It serves as a front-end for the Xbox ecosystem and the Xbox network, including access to Xbox social and community features, Microsoft Store, integration with Xbox One, Series X, and Series S consoles (including remote control and streaming games to the device over a local network), and access to Xbox Cloud Gaming. Versions of the app are available for Windows 11 and Windows 10, Android, iOS, and selected smart TV and digital media player platforms.

The Xbox mobile app was originally released in 2012 as Xbox 360 SmartGlass, and an Xbox One version was released alongside the console's launch in 2013; both apps focused primarily on serving as a companion to Xbox consoles, including the ability to access console features, remote control functionality, and second screen features in supported apps and games.

A Windows 10 version of Xbox One SmartGlass branded as simply "Xbox" was released in 2015, which integrated additional social features, Remote Play, and a library view for PC games. In 2016, the Xbox One SmartGlass app received an update based on the Windows 10 app, and was also rebranded as "Xbox". In 2019, Microsoft released a redesigned Xbox app for Windows 10; this iteration of the app is intended as a general hub for gaming on Windows devices, providing access to Microsoft Store and PC Game Pass, an aggregated library of installed games from third-party stores and launchers such as Battle.net, Steam, Epic Games Store and GOG, and integration with other gaming-oriented features in the OS. The legacy Xbox app on Windows 10 was subsequently renamed "Xbox Console Companion".

== Features ==
The Xbox apps serve primarily as an interface for the Xbox network, including the ability to access the user's activity feed, achievements, and social features such as Xbox friends, messages, and parties, browse Microsoft Store, and view and share recorded gameplay clips. The app can also be used as a remote control for an Xbox One or newer, and games can be streamed from an Xbox console on the same network (Remote Play). The app can be used to access Xbox Cloud Gaming with an eligible Game Pass subscription. Due to platform rules enforced by Apple, Cloud Gaming is not available on iOS.

=== Xbox app on Windows ===
The Xbox app for Windows 10 and 11 contains additional features oriented towards PC gaming, including the ability to purchase, download, and manage games from Microsoft Store and PC Game Pass, and integration with other Xbox-related features in Windows 10 such as the Game Bar (a widget-based overlay for functionality such as managing audio inputs, viewing the Xbox friends list, and system monitoring) and Game DVR. The app can detect other game stores and launchers installed on the device (such as Battle.net, Steam, Epic Games Store, GOG, Ubisoft Connect, and the EA App), and aggregate their libraries on "My Games" and "My Apps" displays. Users can also add custom shortcuts to the "My Apps" and "My Games" views.

In September 2025, alongside the ROG Xbox Ally, Microsoft released "Xbox mode", also known as the Full screen experience, as a timed exclusive to the device; it is a full screen mode with a console-styled interface designed for navigation with gamepad controls. The device can be configured to boot directly into Xbox mode without launching the full Windows shell to conserve system resources. Xbox mode became available as a beta for other Windows 11 devices via Xbox Insider in November 2025, and began to be made generally available in April 2026 in selected territories. In July 2026, Microsoft officially added the ability to play backwards-compatible games from the original Xbox library on Windows, building on the feature previously added to Xbox One and Xbox Series X/S consoles, starting with four titles.

== History ==
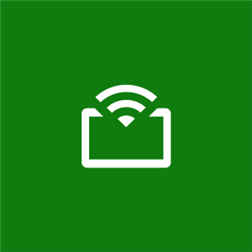
The original logo of the Xbox One SmartGlass app

Xbox 360 SmartGlass was originally announced at E3 2012, for Windows 8, Windows Phone 8, Android and iOS; it was originally designed as a second screen companion, allowing users to navigate the console and access supplemental features and content. During the E3 presentation, Microsoft demonstrated applications such as a minimap for Ascend: Hand of Kul, and supplemental content for School of Rock and Game of Thrones. At launch, SmartGlass integrated with apps and games such as Dance Central 3, the ESPN app, Forza Horizon, Halo Waypoint, HBO Go, Xbox Music (such as controlling playlists while in-game), and Xbox Video. With the release of Xbox One in November 2013, Microsoft released an accompanying Xbox One SmartGlass app for Android, iOS, Windows 8.1, and Windows Phone; this version was navigated using a version of the Xbox One dashboard, with users able to also manage pinned tiles from the app.

In 2015, Windows 10 released with an updated version of the Xbox One SmartGlass app with a new interface, referred to as simply "Xbox"; it included a larger focus on social features including an activity feed, game hubs, Game DVR and OneGuide integration, a library display for PC games from Microsoft Store, and the ability to stream games from an Xbox One console on a local network.

On June 12, 2016, prior to Microsoft's E3 2016 presentation, the Xbox One SmartGlass app on mobile platforms were also rebranded as "Xbox", and received an update with a redesigned interface and social functionality similar to the Windows 10 version. The Xbox mobile apps were updated alongside Xbox One's May 2019 software update, with functionality improvements for messaging, and cross-platform status indicators for the friends list.

On June 9, 2019, coinciding with Microsoft's E3 2019 press conference, Microsoft released a redesigned Xbox app for Windows 10 in beta; it contained a larger focus on PC gaming via Microsoft Store and the recently-announced Xbox Game Pass for PC. The new app requires the Windows 10 May 2019 update (1903) or newer, and is included by default with Windows 11. In advance of the conference, Microsoft rebranded the existing Xbox app on Windows 10 as "Xbox Console Companion".

In 2022, Microsoft began to release a version of the Xbox app for smart TVs, beginning with Samsung Tizen-based models from model year 2022; the Xbox TV app is designed primarily as a client for Xbox Cloud Gaming, and supports controllers paired with the TV over Bluetooth. A similar Xbox Cloud Gaming app was released for Meta Quest virtual reality headsets in December 2023, and an Amazon Fire TV version of the Xbox TV app was released in July 2024.

In October 2024, Microsoft announced that the Xbox app on Android would be updated to allow U.S. users to purchase Xbox games directly from the app. This came following the issuance of a court injunction in Epic Games v. Google, which required that Google allow third-party application stores on Play Store, and prohibiting the company from mandating that apps distributed on Play Store use Google's Play Billing system.

In April 2025, Microsoft began to beta test "Gaming Copilot" (initially "Copilot for Gaming") in the Xbox Insider program, which is a tailored version of the Microsoft Copilot AI chatbot designed to provide tips and assistance in games, as well as surface recommendations on the Xbox platform. "Gaming Copilot" was given a wider release in the PC and mobile in September 2025.

In September 2025, the Xbox Windows app received the ability to detect and aggregate other game stores and launchers installed on the device and present them in a unified library. In January 2026, the Xbox app for Windows 11 received a native version for ARM-based devices. In May 2026, new Xbox division head Asha Sharma stated that Microsoft would wind down Gaming Copilot alongside a restructuring of the division, as she felt it was inconsistent with her priorities for Xbox to "move faster, deepen our connection with the community, and address friction for both players and developers". In July 2026, Xbox introduced their backwards-compatibility program natively on Windows starting with the original Xbox titles Fuzion Frenzy (2001), Blinx: The Time Sweeper (2002), Crimson Skies: High Road to Revenge (2003), and Conker: Live & Reloaded (2005), which run on PC through a similar emulation layer as on Xbox One and Xbox Series X/S. Xbox's vice president of 'Next Generation' Jason Ronald also confirmed that in addition to more titles from Xbox's back-catalog being made available on Windows throughout the year, they planned to add full Achievements support for select original Xbox games on both PC and consoles, including updating the four titles released at that moment.

== See also ==
- PlayStation App – Mobile companion app for PlayStation consoles
- Game Center – Apple online multiplayer social gaming network
- Google Play Games – Online gaming service
- Nintendo Switch Online – Suite of online services for the Nintendo Switch & Nintendo Switch 2
- Comparison of screencasting software
