= PlayStation Portal =

2023 handheld gaming accessory from Sony

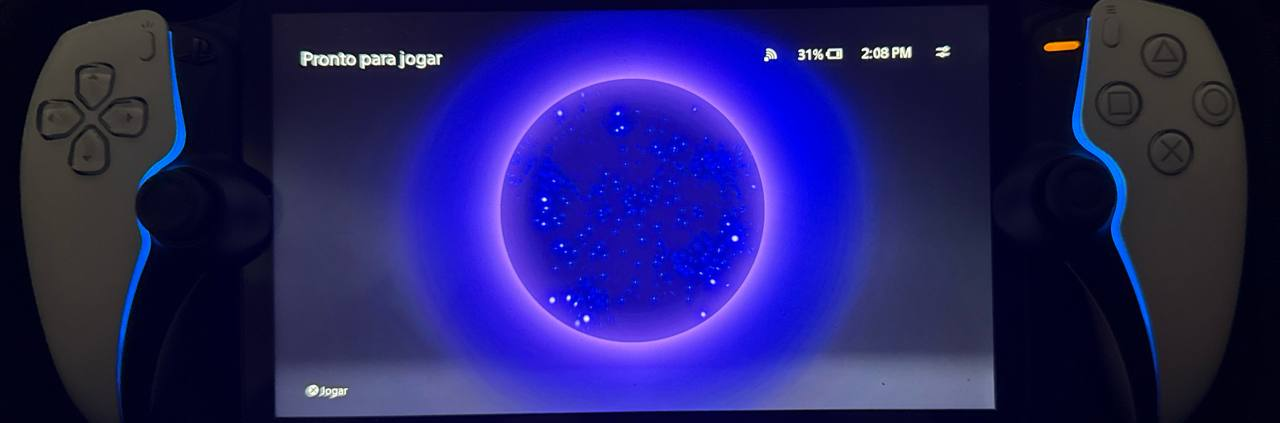
- Codename: Project Q
- Developer: Sony Interactive Entertainment
- Manufacturer: Sony
- Product family: PlayStation
- Type: Handheld gaming device
- Released: JP/NA/EU/AU: November 15, 2023; AE/SA/ZA: February 21, 2024; BR/MX: June 28, 2024; IN: August 3, 2024; SG/HK/TW: September 4, 2024; MY/ID/TH: October 9, 2024
- Introductory price: $199.99
- Operating system: Android
- Display: 1920 × 1080, touch-enabled, 8 inches, 60Hz LCD
- Controller input: DualSense
- Connectivity: Wi-Fi
- Online services: PlayStation Network; PlayStation Plus
- Dimensions: 14.0 × 3.88 × 6.0 inches (356 × 99 × 152 mm)
- Weight: 1.15 pounds (522 grams)
- Related: PlayStation 5
- Website: www.playstation.com/en-us/accessories/playstation-portal-remote-player/

The PlayStation Portal is a handheld gaming accessory for the PlayStation 5, developed by Sony Interactive Entertainment, first released on November 15, 2023. It is used to stream video games from a PlayStation 5 via the Portal's Wi-Fi connection using Remote Play technology. The Portal is able to control the console using its own built-in capacitive touch screen and DualSense-like controller styled like a handheld game console, although it does not run any games or media natively on its own.

== Hardware and technicals ==
The PlayStation Portal's main hardware features include an 8-inch LCD HD screen and "all of the buttons and features of a DualSense controller". It runs a heavily modified version of Android 13 on a Snapdragon 662 system-on-chip. Unlike the Nintendo Switch or Sony's own previous PlayStation Vita and PlayStation Portable, the PlayStation Portal is not a standalone game console and only functions as a streaming receiver for PlayStation 5. In November 2024, Sony rolled out test versions of the device's software to give cloud gaming access to players with PlayStation Plus Premium, which exited beta and became officially available in November 2025.

== Connectivity ==
The PlayStation Portal connects to a paired PlayStation 5 through a local area network instead of directly, using the Portal's Wi-Fi connection. The controller commands and video stream are transmitted over the local network, which means that a broadband Internet connection is not required at home other than for authentication purposes or to play online multiplayer games. When outdoors or remote, an Internet connection is required; the Portal itself does not feature 4G/5G cellular connectivity, instead connecting to a Wi-Fi access point elsewhere, which may also include tethering to an existing cell phone's connection.

Due to the lack of a web browser, the PlayStation Portal was initially unable to connect to most public Wi-Fi hotspots which require access to a captive portal for authentication. A system software update rolled out on June 19, 2024, allowing users to connect to these public networks. This was initially limited to the 2.4 GHz radio band, but another firmware update released in July added support for 5 GHz public Wi-Fi networks.

Publications have noted that the quality of the stream, both locally and remote, is highly dependent on the home router, and generally recommend the PlayStation 5 to be hardwired to the router using Ethernet instead of wirelessly.

== Development ==
The PlayStation Portal was developed under the codename Project Q. Rumors of the device began circulating in early 2023, with reports describing a handheld device focused solely on Remote Play, codenamed "Q Lite". The device was officially announced during the PlayStation Showcase on May 23, 2023, where it was presented as a dedicated accessory for the PlayStation 5 rather than a standalone console successor to the PlayStation Vita.

On August 23, 2023, Sony officially revealed the final name as the PlayStation Portal, along with its pricing and release window.

== Reception ==
The PlayStation Portal received mixed to positive reviews from critics. Reviewers generally praised the device's build quality, screen, and ergonomic integration of the DualSense controller features, but criticized its reliance on network stability and lack of Bluetooth support.

Seth G. Macy of IGN awarded the device an 8/10, calling it "the best PlayStation 5 Remote Play solution available." He highlighted the 8-inch LCD screen as "bright and vibrant" and praised the retention of the DualSense's haptic feedback and adaptive triggers, noting that the experience felt significantly more authentic than using a smartphone with a clamp controller. Screen Rant similarly praised the hardware, describing it as "an incredible piece of hardware that slots perfectly into something I didn’t know I wanted."

However, the device's strict requirement for a strong Wi-Fi connection was a frequent point of contention. The Verge noted that the user experience "lives and dies by your Wi-Fi," with performance suffering noticeably on unstable networks. Michael Higham of GameSpot was more critical, stating the device "just isn't good enough" due to inconsistent connection quality and image compression, even on decent home networks.

Engadget described the Portal as "baffling" and questioned the $199 price point for a device that cannot play games locally. The review also criticized the omission of Bluetooth support, which forces users to use wired headphones or purchase proprietary PlayStation Link audio accessories. The device was frequently referred to in the media as the "Dad station," a nickname reflecting its niche but effective appeal to parents and users in shared living spaces who cannot always commandeer the main television.

Following its announcement, there was a degree of doubt about the potential of the device. However, the PlayStation Portal has reportedly been a sales success, becoming the best-selling PS5 accessory in the United States in 2024. Eleven months on from its U.S. launch, an estimated minimum of 420,000 units had been sold in the country.

In 2024, data from Circana indicated that the PlayStation Portal was the best-selling accessory in dollar sales for the year in the US market. By late 2024, industry analysts estimated that roughly 3% of PlayStation 5 owners had purchased the device.

== Hacking ==
In 2024, security researcher Andy "theflow0" Nguyen announced he was able to hack the PlayStation Portal and run PlayStation Portable games on it through the PPSSPP emulator, posting a picture of the Portal running the PSP release of Grand Theft Auto: Liberty City Stories.
