= Tvigle =

Streaming service

tvigle.ru
- Website type: Video on demand
- Available in: Russian
- Owner: Egor Yakovlev Evgenia Petrova
- Website: tvigle.ru
- Commercial: Yes
- Registration: Not required
- Launched: 2007
- Current status: Active

Tvigle is a website, video syndication network and over-the-top (OTT) delivery service offering ad-supported on-demand streaming of TV shows, webisodes and other videos from BBC Worldwide, Fox, ABC, Nickelodeon, Channel One and other smaller networks. Tvigle videos are offered only to users in Russia and Ukraine, in Flash Video and HTML5 format, as well as 288p, 360p, 480p, and 720p HD. Via proprietary SaaS service VideoPublisher Tvigle also provides services for clients, among which are popular Russian media television channels, such as Forbes, Dailymotion, MTV Russia and Muz-TV.

Tvigle is a privately owned company, started by Egor Yakovlev in 2007 but is 25% owned by Allianz ROSNO since 2009, later followed by investment from Media3 in 2011.

== History ==
Tvigle Media LLc was established in 2007 as an internet video platform, offering content to a Russian audience.

The Tvigle Video Publisher was established in 2008, offering web syndication and SaaS services for other websites and media clients. Video Publisher customers can access Tvigle licensed content, and have the ability to upload and use their own video content.

In 2009, in addition to BBC Worldwide, ABC and Fox programs and movies, Tvigle began producing short videos. One of their more popular titles was Versus, an animated series by Red Medusa Productions, that was initially created to advertise the XPYC Team brand of flour-based chips. In September 2012, Tvigle launched a new season of the cartoon that was separate from the commercials, with 20 new episodes.

== Features ==
Tvigle is accessible on a range of platforms, which include:

- Smart televisions
- Dune, BBK, set-top boxes and games consoles
- Smartphones and tablets

In 2009, a subscription-free version of the service was launched in the iTunes App Store, for devices running iOS version 4 or higher.

== Programming ==
Tvigle includes programming from multiple networks, including:

=== Networks and channels ===
- Fox
- The Walt Disney Company: ABC, ABC Family
- Nickelodeon
- Channel One
- CTC Media
- MTV Russia

=== Tvigle Exclusive (catch-up broadcasting) ===
In 2011, Tvigle Media signed deals with BBC Worldwide and Fox International to offer catch-up broadcasting of the new seasons of popular shows, dubbed in Russian, after the premiere of each episode in the United States and United Kingdom. It was previously unprecedented for the Russian VOD market, that a foreign TV programme would appear on a web-source before a TV presentation.

Some Tvigle shows include:

- Misfits (BBC)
- The Walking Dead (FOX)
- Luther (BBC)
- Short course of happy life (Channel One)
