= Xbox Cloud Gaming =

Microsoft cloud gaming service

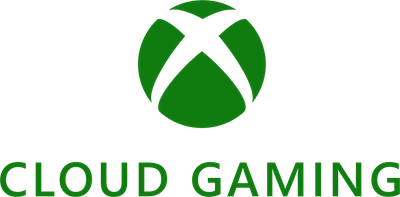
- Logo used in 2019
- Developer: Xbox (Microsoft)
- Type: Cloud gaming service
- Launched: September 15, 2020; 6 years ago
- Preview version: 1.0 / November 14, 2019; 6 years ago
- Platform: Cross-platform
- Operating systems: Android, Windows, iOS, iPadOS, macOS, Xbox One, Xbox Series X/S, ChromeOS, Meta Horizon OS, select Fire TV devices, and select Samsung and LG smart TVs and smart monitors
- Status: Active
- Pricing model: Xbox Game Pass
- Availability: Available in 29 countries.
- Website: Official website

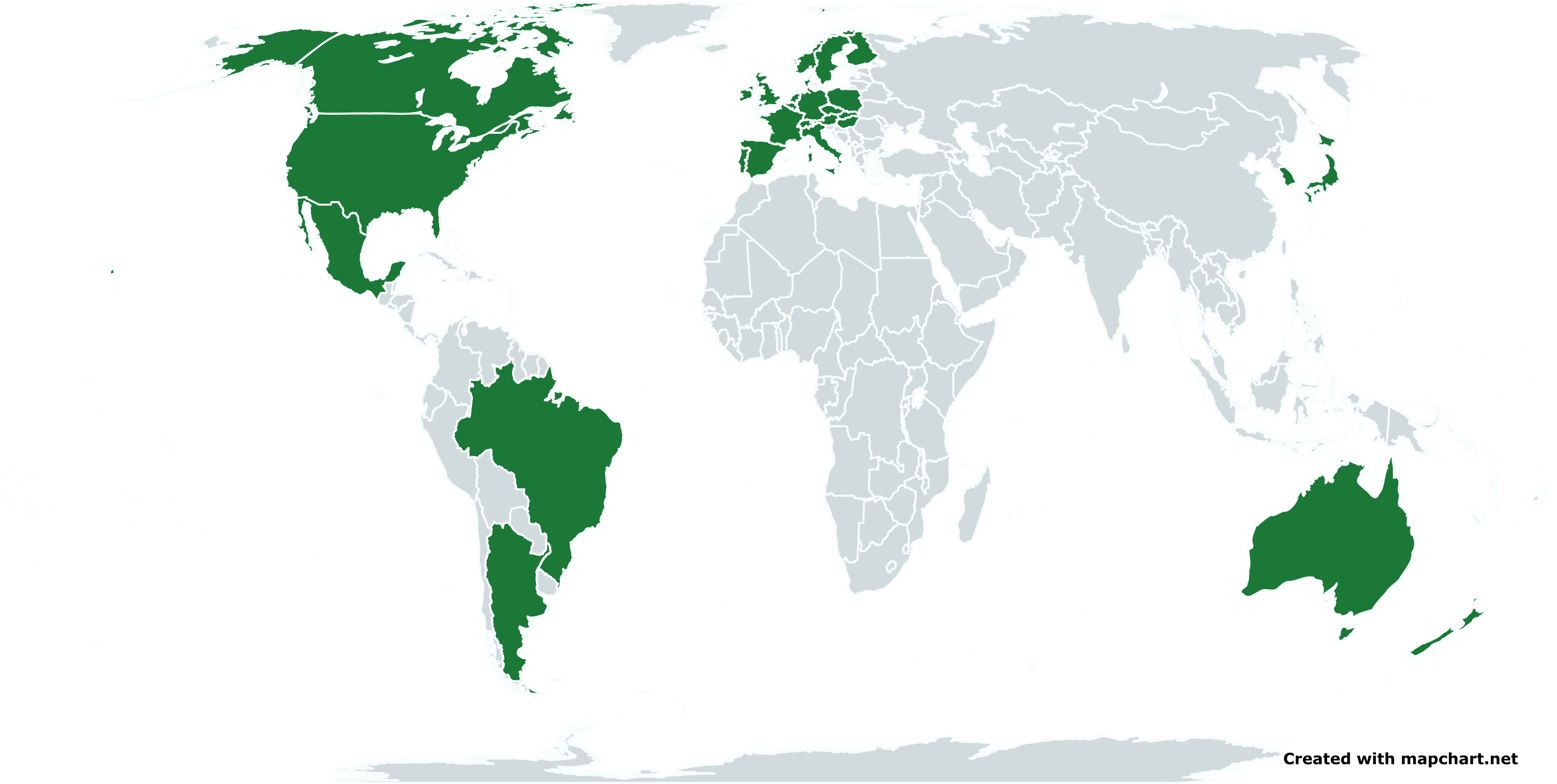
Xbox Cloud Gaming available countries as of September 11, 2026

Xbox Cloud Gaming, stylized as XBOX Cloud Gaming, is a cloud gaming service as part of Xbox offered by the latter's division of Microsoft. Initially released in beta testing in November 2019, the service later launched for subscribers of Xbox Game Pass Ultimate on September 15, 2020. Xbox Game Pass cloud gaming is provided to subscribers at no additional cost. Xbox Cloud Gaming operates by linking the device to a remote server in the cloud.

== Development ==
The ideas for the cloud service came within Microsoft around 2016, around the same time that Kareem Choudhry developed the Xbox 360 backwards compatibility for the Xbox One. As his team developed this solution, Choudhry also had the idea if they could provide these games without having need of a console, and got Spencer's go-ahead to start a small team to determine the feasibility of cloud gaming. The technology was deemed successful enough at around the time of Xbox Game Pass's introduction that Microsoft assembled a larger team to build up the cloud gaming platform.

Microsoft teased the service at E3 2018 and formally announced Project xCloud several months later, in October 2018. They demonstrated the service in March 2019 with the racing game Forza Horizon 4 playing on an Android smartphone with an Xbox One controller. Xbox head Phil Spencer used a private server during this time to test games on a remote connection. The service entered its home testing phase in May 2019, when it could be used outside the lab environment. It entered public testing later in the year and was unveiled at E3 2019.

Microsoft said that its Xbox content library will make its service more appealing than competitors such as Stadia. The hardware at launch used Xbox One S-based blade servers, but began to transition to Xbox Series X-based servers in June 2021. Each server initially had four customized Xbox One S-based units for the 2018 teaser, but this was doubled to eight per server in a 2U enclosure for the service's launch in 2019. Compared to the standard Xbox One S, power consumption has been reduced by 30% through processor-specific power tuning. Video output is set for 120 Hz to reduce latency.

Trials of the service began in October 2019, and as of November 2019, the service hosts 50 games, with support in testing for Apple Inc.'s iOS mobile devices, and for Sony Interactive Entertainment's DualShock controllers.

On February 12, 2020, Project xCloud launched in preview for iOS through a limited beta on TestFlight, with limited participation and support only for Halo: The Master Chief Collection.

Microsoft released Xbox Cloud Gaming across 21 countries in North America and Europe, as well as in South Korea, on September 15, 2020, for select Android devices, with support for more than 150 games at launch.

Xbox Cloud Gaming was released in its beta form for Windows users on August 9, 2021, as a perk of the Xbox Game Pass Ultimate subscription, though also required users to be registered in the Xbox Insider program. It was officially released as part of the Xbox app for Windows on September 14, 2021, along with Remote Play support from Xbox consoles to a Windows computer. Microsoft introduced a Clarity Boost feature for Windows users through the Edge browser that provides client-side visual improvements to the streamed content.

In October 2021, an Xbox Cloud Gaming client was released in beta for Xbox One via Xbox Insider. In November 2023, Meta Platforms announced that Xbox Cloud Gaming would be released as an app for Meta Quest VR headsets in December 2023. In June 2024, Microsoft announced that Xbox Cloud Gaming would become available on Amazon Fire TV Stick in July 2024.

Xbox Cloud Gaming officially exited beta on October 1, 2025 alongside a revamp of the Xbox Game Pass plan structure. On October 3, 2025, it was reported that Microsoft was also testing a free advertising-supported version of Cloud Gaming, limited to "some" of the games the user owns and a small rotating selection of free titles.

In September 2026, Microsoft announced usage limits for Xbox Cloud Gaming, with Game Pass Essential, Premium, and Ultimate limited to 5, 10, and 15 hours of play per-month; additional time must be purchased from Microsoft Store. Microsoft stated that the changes were required in order to cover the increasing costs of operating the Xbox Cloud Gaming service. It was also announced that users would also be able to "stream eligible games they own on supported devices" without a Game Pass subscription in the future. The next month, Microsoft started to roll out a la carte pricing for cloud gaming of games that they already own, allowing users to buy hours of cloud gaming at rates from $0.24 to $0.40 per hour, with discounts for larger purchases. Once purchased, these hours remain credited to the user until they are used.

== Availability ==
Xbox Cloud Gaming is available in 29 countries, including Argentina, Australia, Austria, Belgium, Brazil, Canada, the Czech Republic, Denmark, Finland, France, Germany, Hungary, India, Ireland, Italy, Japan, Mexico, the Netherlands, New Zealand, Norway, Poland, Portugal, Slovakia, South Korea, Spain, Sweden, Switzerland, the United Kingdom, and the United States.

In September 2021, Microsoft expanded the service to Australia, Brazil, Japan, and Mexico.In June 2022, the service was expanded further to include Argentina and New Zealand. In November 2025, the service was expanded further to include India.

== Games ==
The Xbox Series X/S's backward compatibility allows xCloud to retain the existing library of Xbox games while adding new games from the Xbox Series X/S. The Xbox Game Pass Library currently lists 382 cloud-enabled games. The list includes Halo: The Master Chief Collection, Forza Horizon 5, The Outer Worlds, Yakuza Kiwami 2, and Microsoft Flight Simulator.

Hellblade: Senua's Sacrifice was the first game to support full touch controls. Touch controls have since been added to another 186 games.

Microsoft introduced cloud play support for selected original Xbox and Xbox 360 titles using its backward compatibility program starting in March 2021 with 16 titles available. Players are able to use cloud-based saved games from the original release of these titles if they have used that service as part of Xbox Live Gold. Some of the games also support official touch controls when played on mobile devices.

In November 2024, Microsoft announced the ability to stream eligible games that Xbox Game Pass Ultimate users have purchased from the Microsoft Store which were not already in the Xbox Game Pass library. The list of eligible games is regularly updated alongside the monthly Xbox Game Pass additions.

== Reception ==
The service received generally positive initial impressions from reviewers. Playing over a T-Mobile LTE connection with just 25 Mbit/s download speed caused no effect on image quality. Even while playing on a moving bus and train, there was no noticeable loss of image quality.

Reviewers also reported that starting up games on the phone feels faster because the games are running on more powerful remote servers rather than a hard drive on a console. Load times are also minimized and closer to a PC gaming experience.

== Hardware ==
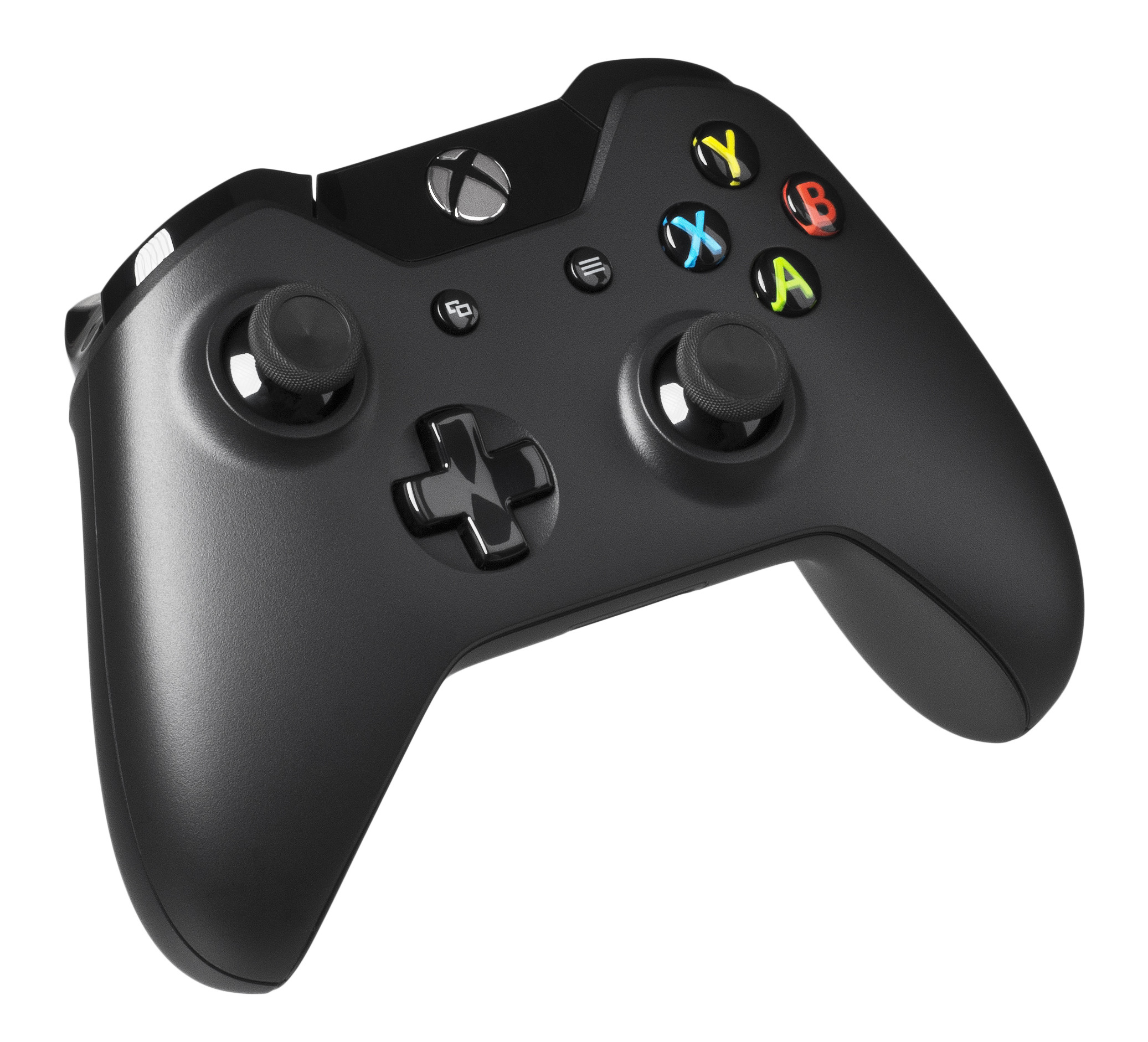
Xbox Cloud Gaming works using an Xbox Wireless Controller.

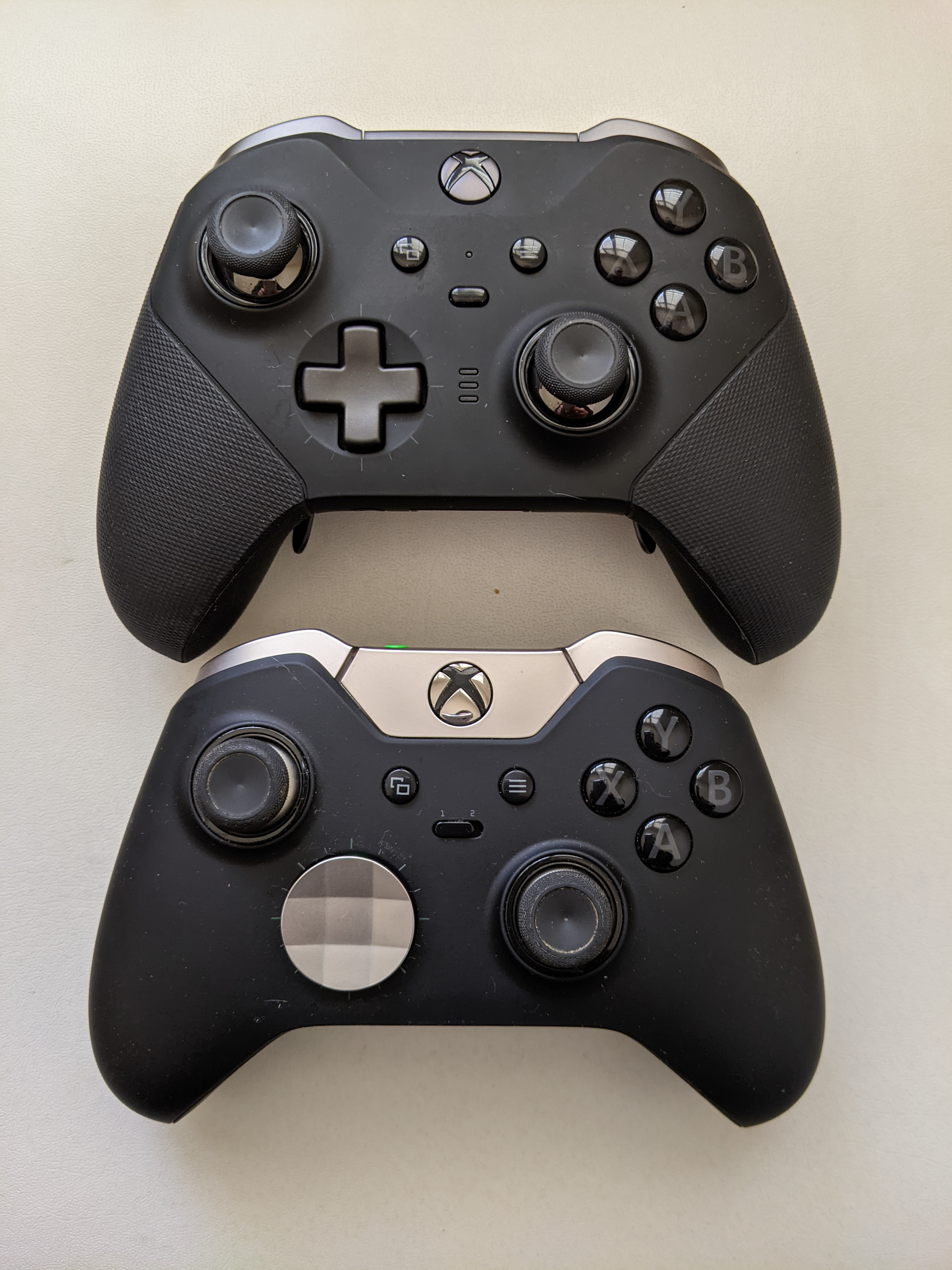
Series 2 (top) and original Elite (bottom) controllers

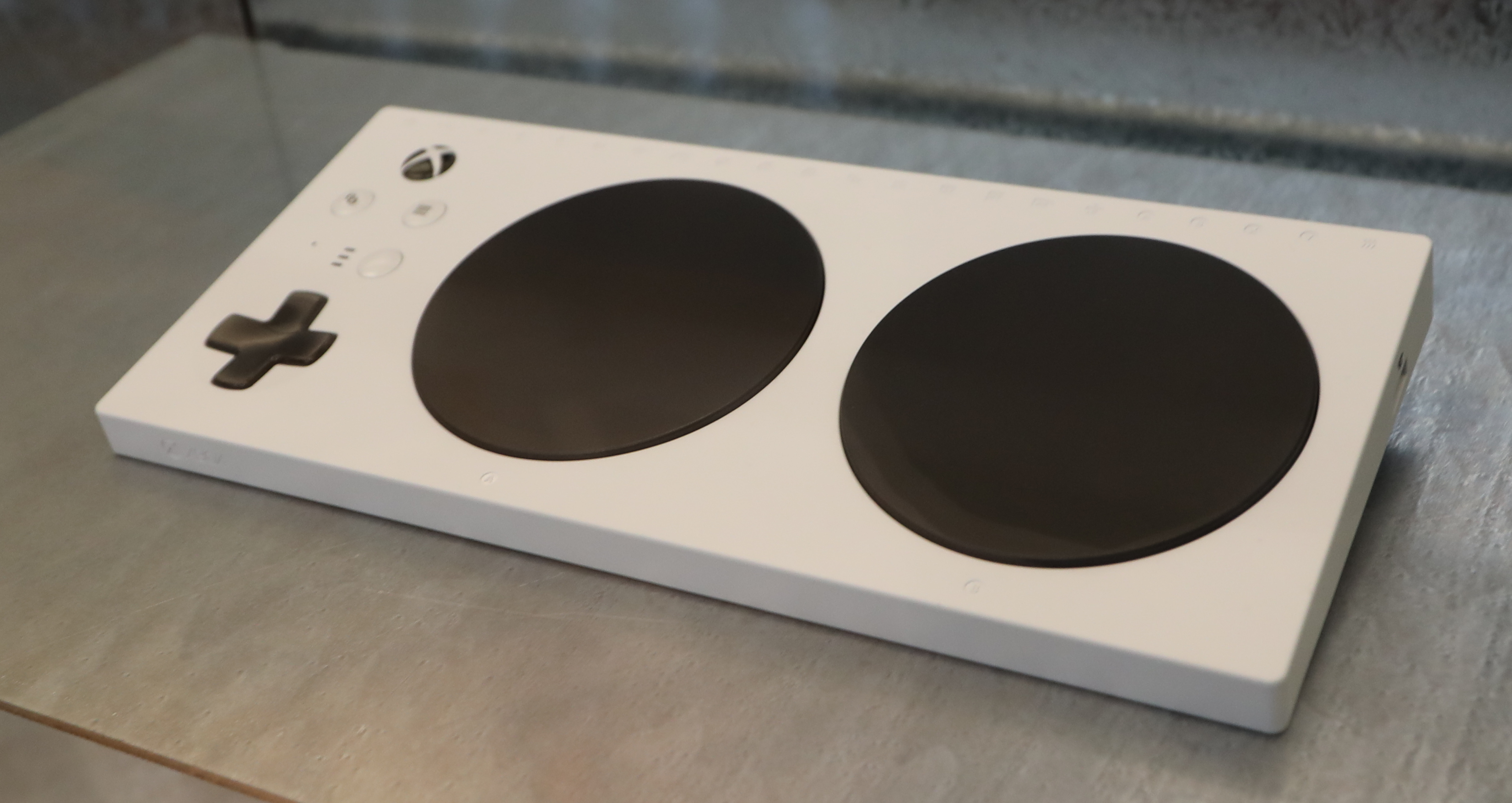
Xbox Adaptive Controller

Xbox Cloud Gaming runs via Microsoft's 54 Azure cloud computing centers, hosted in 140 countries. Microsoft upgraded its server blades to the more capable Xbox Series X hardware in 2021.

The service is designed to work with phones, either with touchscreen controls or a game controller over Bluetooth. Notable supported controller models include:

- Official Xbox controllers
  - Xbox Wireless Controller
  - Xbox Elite Wireless Controller Series 1 and Series 2
  - Xbox Adaptive Controller
- Logitech
  - Gamepad F310
  - Wireless Gamepad F710
  - G920
  - G923 (Xbox edition)
  - G PRO Racing Wheel (Xbox edition)
  - RS50 (Xbox edition)
- Razer Inc.
  - Kishi (Xbox edition)
  - Kishi v2 for iPhone (Xbox edition)
  - Kishi v2 Pro (Xbox edition)
  - Kishi v3
  - Kishi v3 Pro
  - Kishi v3 Pro XL
  - Kishi Ultra
  - Prio
  - Wolverine Ultimate
  - Wolverine Tournament Edition
  - Wolverine v2
  - Wolverine v2 Chroma
  - Wolverine v3 Pro
  - Wolverine v3 Tournament Edition
  - Wolverine v3 Bluetooth
  - Wolverine v4 Pro
  - Wolverine v4 Tournament Edition
  - Atrox Arcade Stick
  - Raiju Mobile Gaming Controller for Android
  - Junglecat
  - Razer Wireless Controller
- Sony
  - DualShock 4 Wireless Controller
  - DualSense Wireless Controller
- SteelSeries
  - Stratus XL for Windows, Android, and VR
  - Stratus Duo for Windows, Chromebook, Android, and VR
  - Stratus+ for Windows, Chromebook, and Android
  - Nimbus+ for iPhone, iPad, iPod Touch, and Apple TV
  - Nimbus Cloud
  - Aeon Pro
- Backbone Labs
  - Backbone One (Xbox edition)
  - Backbone Pro (Xbox edition)
- Google
  - Stadia Controller
- Amazon
  - Luna Controller
- Nintendo
  - Joy-Con
  - Joy-Con 2
  - Nintendo Switch Pro Controller
  - Nintendo Switch 2 Pro Controller
- Gamevice
  - Gamevice for Android
  - Gamevice for iPhone
  - Gamevice for iPad
  - Flex for Android
  - Flex for iPhone
- Nacon
  - MG-X (Xbox edition)
  - MG-X Pro (Xbox edition)
  - Revolution X Pro Controller
  - Revolution X Unlimited Controller
  - Pro Compact Controller
  - Xbox Revo Controller
  - Xbox Revo X Pro Controller
  - Xbox Revo X Max Controller
  - Manette EVOL-X
  - Manette EVOL-X Pro
  - Daija Arcade Stick (Xbox edition)
- GameSir
  - X2 Pro Mobile Game Controller
  - X4 Aileron Xbox Mobile Gaming Controller
  - X5 Lite for Xbox
  - X5s Wireless Mobile Game Controller
  - Kaleid Xbox Wired Controller
  - Kaleid Flux Xbox Wired Controller
  - T7 Wired Controller for Xbox
  - T7 Pro Floral Wired Controller for Xbox
  - T7 Pro Sugar Whirl Wireless Controller for Xbox
  - T7 Pro Retro Green Game Controller
  - Tarantula Pro Wired eSports Controller for Xbox & PC
  - G7 SE Xbox Wired Controller
  - G7 HE Xbox Wired Controller
  - G7 Pro Tri-Mode Xbox Wired, PC & Mobile Wireless Controller
  - G8 Plus MFi Type-C Mobile Controller (Apple Certified)
- ContrlPWR
  - Cloud Gaming Controller for iOS (Xbox edition)
- Amkette
  - EvoFox Deck Smartphone Gamepad
  - EvoFox Deck 2 Smartphone Gamepad
  - EvoFox Go Smartphone Bluetooth Gamepad
  - Evo Gamepad Pro 4 for Android Smartphones
- Hori
  - HORIPAD Pro
  - HORIPAD Turbo SL
  - Fighting Stick α (Alpha)
  - Fighting Commander OCTA
- PowerA
  - MOGA XP5-A Plus
  - MOGA XP5-i Plus
  - MOGA XP5-X Plus
  - MOGA XP7-X Plus
  - MOGA XP-ULTRA Multi-Platform Wireless Controller for Mobile, PC and Xbox Series X|S
  - Wired Controller for Xbox Series X|S
  - Enhanced Wired Controller for Xbox Series X|S
  - Nano Enhanced Wired Controller for Xbox Series X|S
  - Spectra Infinity Enhanced Wired Controller for Xbox Series X|S
  - Symmetric Wired Controller for Xbox Series X|S
  - Advantage Wired Controller for Xbox Series X|S
  - Advantage Plus Wired Controller for Xbox Series X|S
  - Wireless Controller for Xbox Series X|S
  - FUSION Pro 2 Wired Controller for Xbox Series X|S
  - FUSION Pro 3 Wired Controller for Xbox Series X|S
  - FUSION Pro 4 Wired Controller for Xbox Series X|S
  - FUSION Pro Wireless Controller for Xbox Series X|S
- Turtle Beach Corporation
  - Recon Controller
  - Recon Cloud Hybrid Game Controller
  - Atom Controller
  - REACT-R Controller
  - Stealth Ultra Wireless Controller with Rapid Charge Dock
  - Stealth Ultra II Wireless Controller with Rapid Charge Dock
  - Stealth Pivot Wireless Smart Controller
  - Pacific Skyline Wireless Controller
  - Racer Wireless Racing Wheel
  - PDP Wired Controller
  - PDP Afterglow Wired RGB Gaming Controller
  - PDP Rematch Core Wired Controller
  - PDP Afterglow Ignite Wired Controller
  - PDP Rematch Advanced Wired Controller
  - PDP Rematch Wireless RGB Gaming Controller
  - PDP Rematch Glow Advanced Wired Controller
  - PDP Afterglow Wired Controller (Xbox edition)
  - PDP Afterglow Wave Wired Controller (Xbox edition)
  - PDP Neon Wired Controller
  - PDP REALMz Wired Controller (Xbox edition)
  - PDP REALMz Wireless Controller (Xbox edition)
  - PDP Riffmaster Wireless Guitar Controller (Xbox edition)
  - PDP REPLAY Wireless Controller
  - Victrix Pro KO Leverless Fight Stick (Xbox edition)
  - Victrix Pro BFG Wireless Controller (Xbox edition)
  - Victrix Pro BFG Reloaded Wireless Modular Controller (Xbox edition)
  - Victrix Gambit Dual Core Tournament Controller
  - Victrix Gambit Prime Tournament Controller

=== Mobile devices ===
==== Android ====
Xbox Cloud Gaming works with any Android phone or tablet that has at least Android 12.0 and Bluetooth 4.0. Examples of supported devices include the Logitech G Cloud, the Razer Edge, the Samsung Galaxy Tab S5e, the Galaxy Tab S9 Ultra, the Galaxy S20 Ultra, the Galaxy Z Fold 5, the Galaxy Z Flip 5, the OnePlus 8 and the OnePlus 11.

In March 2021, Microsoft released an update to the Android Xbox Cloud Gaming client that allows dual-screened devices like the Surface Duo to use the second screen to host the touch controls. Several notable games such as Minecraft Dungeons and New Super Lucky's Tale support the dedicated gamepad on the second screen.

Some games such as Gears 5 support motion controls using the device's built in gyro and provide a dedicated control scheme when using the gamepad mode.

In October 2023, Meta Platforms announced an Xbox Cloud Gaming app for Meta Quest 3 and newer (based on Android source code) virtual reality headsets.

==== iOS ====
While Microsoft had planned to release xCloud for iOS devices, the company halted iOS testing in August 2020, asserting that policies on the Apple App Store limited what functionality they could provide for the service. Apple clarified that cloud streaming services like xCloud allow Microsoft to release games onto the iOS platform that bypass the normal checks that Apple performs for other apps, and thus refused to allow the app on the platform.

However, in September 2020, Apple altered its rules that allowed xCloud and other cloud gaming apps to work on iOS, with restrictions that each game must be offered as an individual download on the iOS store which the user must use before playing, though catalog apps as part of the service can list and link to these games. Microsoft responded negatively to this change, stating that

"This remains a bad experience for customers. Gamers want to jump directly into a game from their curated catalog within one app just like they do with movies or songs, and not be forced to download over 100 apps to play individual games from the cloud. We’re committed to putting gamers at the center of everything we do, and providing a great experience is core to that mission."

— Microsoft

Microsoft had considered the possibility of making each game its own application as to satisfy Apple's requirements, according to The Verge based on emails uncovered during the Epic Games v. Apple trial. Microsoft suggested in October 2020 that to work around Apple's restriction, it may bring xCloud to iOS as a browser-based web application, which would not have its content restricted by the App Store limitations. The company later announced that it will use this approach to bring a browser-based version of the cloud gaming service to both personal computers and to iOS devices to be released sometime by the second quarter of 2021. An invite-only beta test of the browser version started on April 20, 2021. The full version for all Xbox Game Pass subscribers was released on June 28, 2021.

=== Xbox consoles ===
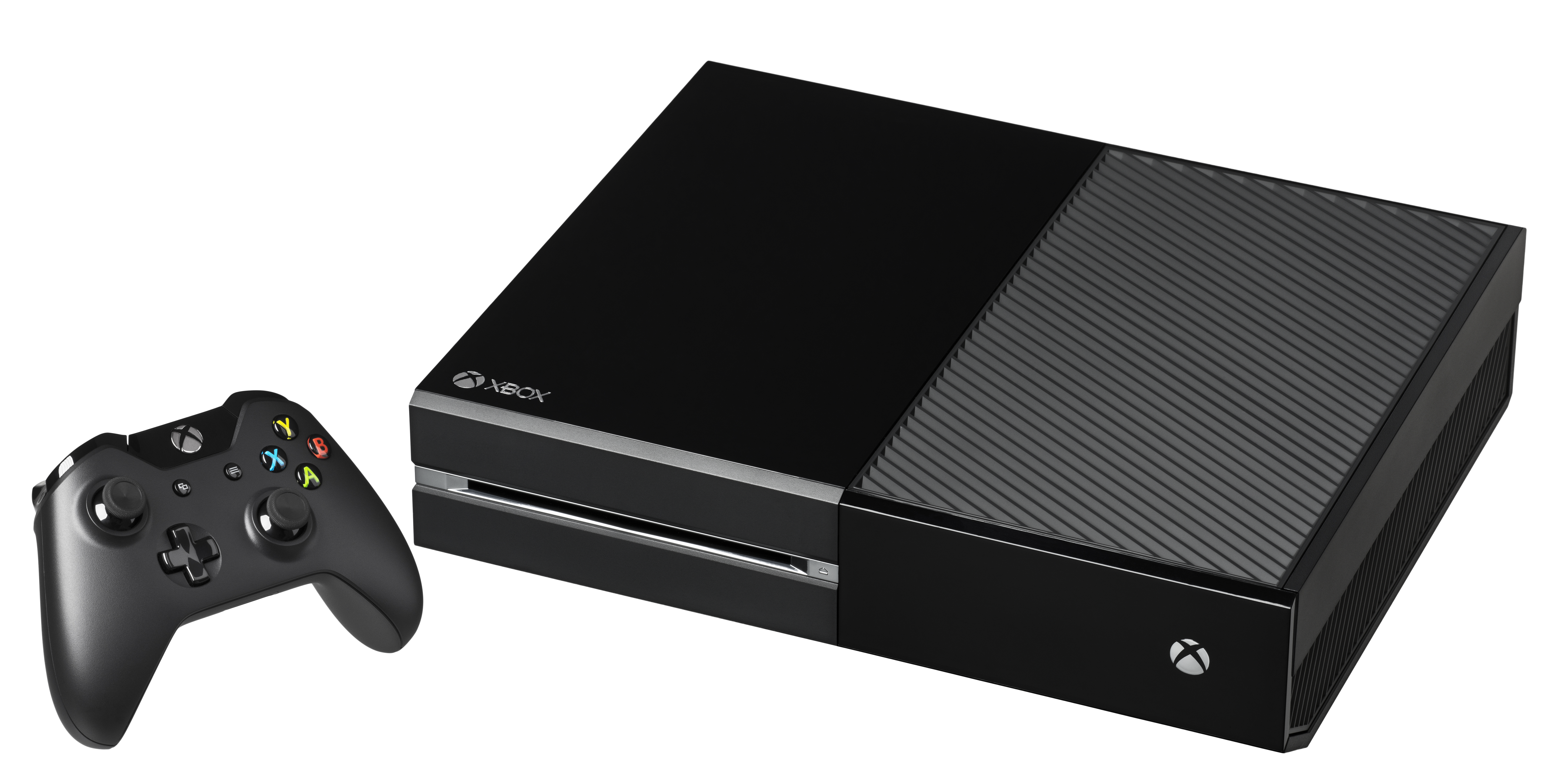
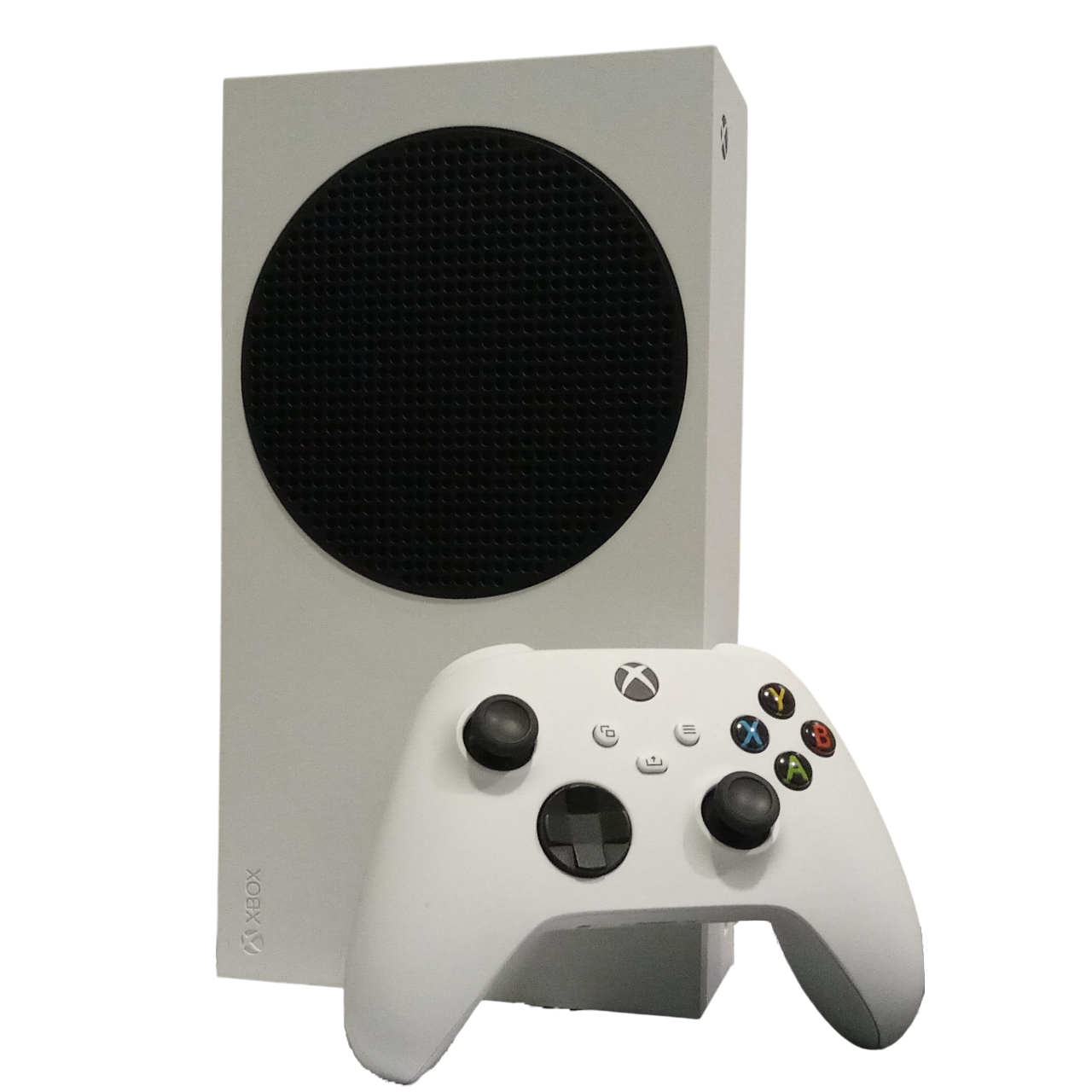
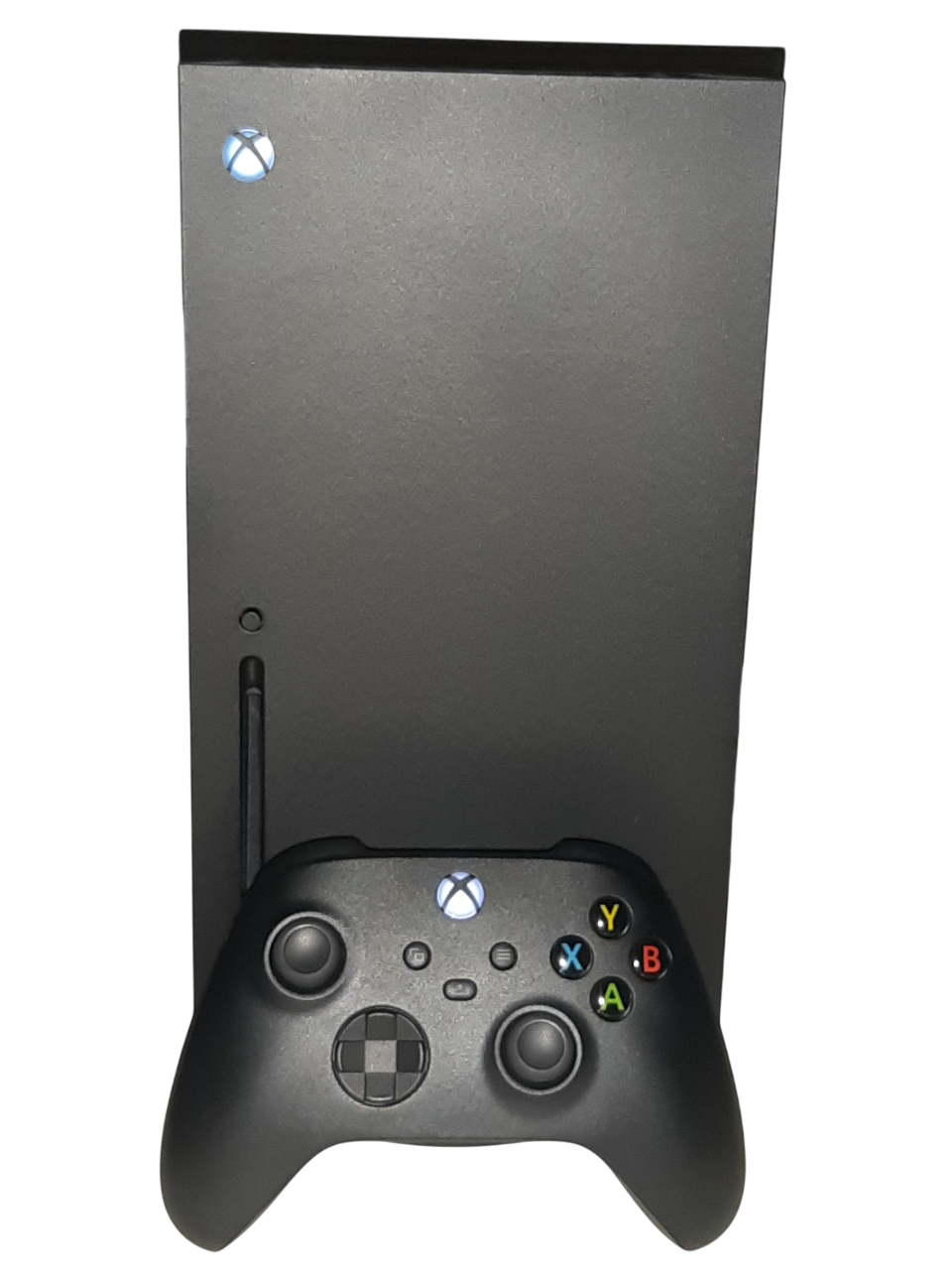
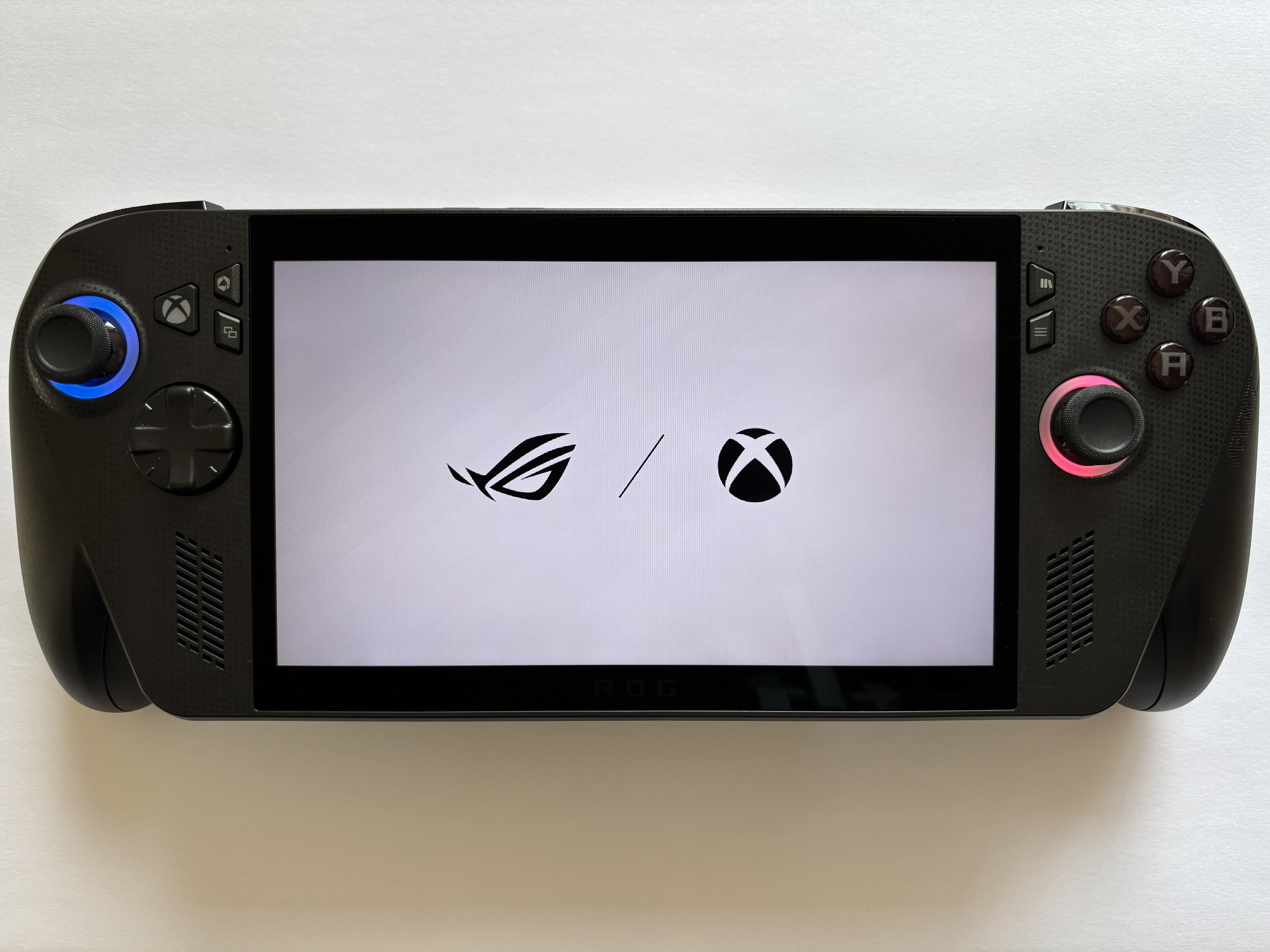

Microsoft also announced plans to bring cloud gaming to the Xbox One and Xbox Series X/S consoles later in 2021, which would also allow Xbox One users to play games that are only able to run on the Series X/S consoles. The feature was made available on November 17, 2021.

=== Other devices ===
Alongside the iOS browser-based version, browser-based Xbox Cloud Gaming through supported browsers in Windows 10 computers was added for Xbox Game Pass subscribers on June 28, 2021. Invite-only beta testing launched alongside the iOS beta test on April 20, 2021. Spencer has also stated that Microsoft is working to bring the service to smart TVs and streaming sticks, though a challenge here is assuring minimal latency between the television and the controller. Microsoft confirmed in May 2022 that a streaming device was in development under the codename Keystone. However, by November 2022, Spencer stated that they had ceased development of this device, as it was too costly compared to the Xbox Series S, and surpassed the $99-$129 price range they had envisioned.

In July 2022, Xbox Cloud Gaming was launched on select Samsung Smart TVs and Smart Monitors via the Xbox app, with support for Bluetooth controllers. Microsoft said that other smart TV brands were being evaluated for the Xbox app for smart TVs. The service was also added to Meta Quest VR headsets in December 2023 via a beta version of the Xbox Cloud Gaming app. In June 2024, it was announced that Microsoft had partnered with Amazon to bring Xbox Cloud Gaming to Fire TV devices through the Xbox TV app.

== See also ==
- Azure Virtual Desktop
- EA Play
- Ubisoft+
- Windows 365
- Xbox SmartGlass
- Off-TV Play
- Remote Play
- GeForce Now
- PlayStation Now
- Amazon Luna
- Steam Link
- Boosteroid
- Shadow (service)
- AirConsole
