= GeForce Now =

Cloud gaming service

- Developer: Nvidia
- Type: Cloud gaming service
- Launched: October 1, 2015 (beta); February 4, 2020 (public)
- Current version: Full Release
- Platforms: Nvidia Shield, Microsoft Windows, macOS, Linux (beta), Android, iOS, ChromeOS, Tizen, WebOS, Steam Deck, Steam Machine, Apple Vision Pro, Meta Horizon OS, Steam Frame, Valve Index, Amazon Fire TV (2026)
- Members: ▲25 million (as of February 2023)
- Pricing model: Freemium; Day pass options; Monthly and annual membership subscriptions (capped at 100 hours a month with paid extensions available)
- Website: www.nvidia.com/geforce-now/

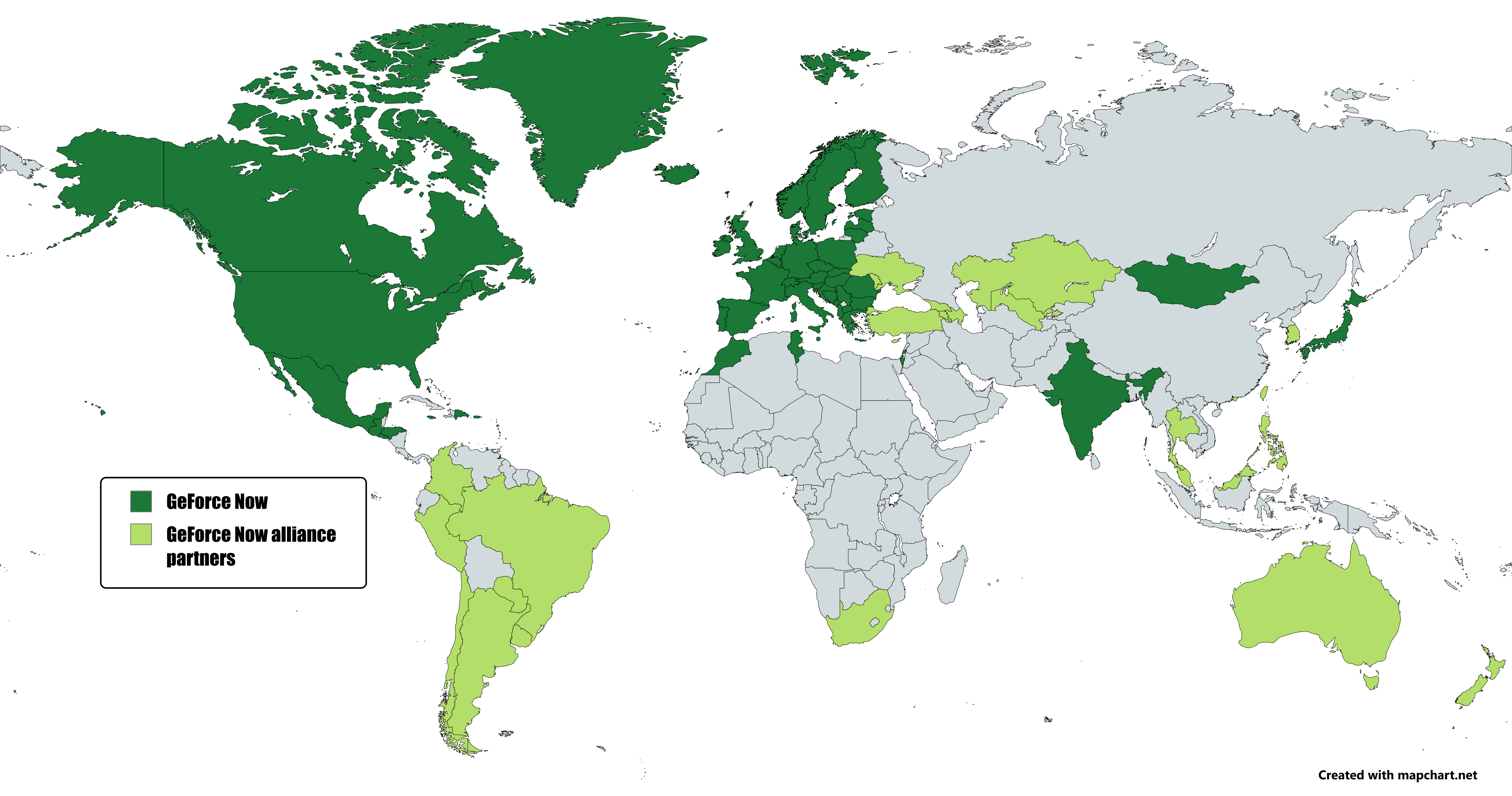
GeForce Now available countries

GeForce Now (stylized as GeForce NOW) is a cloud gaming service operated by Nvidia. It was originally titled Nvidia Grid, a cloud gaming service for Nvidia Shield devices, launched in 2013. On September 30, 2015, Nvidia rebranded the service as GeForce Now and introduced a $7.99/month subscription model. The subscription service provided users with unlimited access to a library of games hosted on Nvidia servers for the life of the subscription, being delivered to subscribers through streaming video. Certain titles were also available via a "Buy & Play" model. This version was discontinued in 2019, and transitioned to a new version of the service that enabled Shield users to play their own games.

In January 2017, Nvidia unveiled GeForce Now clients for Windows and Mac computers, available in North America and Europe as a free beta. GeForce NOW lets users access a virtual computer, where they can install their existing games from existing digital distribution platforms, and play them remotely. As with the original Shield version, the virtual desktop is also streamed from Nvidia servers.

The service exited Beta and launched to the general public on February 4, 2020. It is available on Windows, macOS, Linux (beta), Android, iOS/iPadOS, ChromeOS, Shield TV, Tizen, WebOS, the Steam Deck, the Steam Machine, and VR/MR headsets including Apple Vision Pro, Meta Quest which running Meta Horizon OS, Steam Frame, and Valve Index. The technology that powers GeForce NOW was invented by Franck Diard and Xun Wang. The patent is owned by Nvidia.

== Features ==
GeForce Now consists of a network of servers based in data centers across North America, Europe, Asia, Australia, South America, the Middle East, and Africa, that host and serve the GeForce Now game library to members in over 100 countries.

=== Streaming technology ===
The service uses AV1 encoding on newer server generations, providing approximately 40% bitrate savings compared to H.264 at similar quality levels. HEVC and H.264 remain available for devices without AV1 decoding hardware, with adaptive bitrate streaming scaling quality based on available bandwidth. Cinematic Quality Streaming (CQS) features YUV 4:4:4 chroma sampling, 10-bit HDR support, AI-powered HUD sharpness filters, and maximum bitrates up to 100 Mbit/s. DLSS 4 Multi-Frame Generation support can generate up to three additional frames per rendered frame in supported titles.

== Subscription tiers ==
GeForce Now offers three primary subscription tiers plus legacy plans.

=== Free tier ===
The Free tier provides 1-hour gaming sessions with ad-supported waiting periods and the longest queue times. Streaming is limited to 1080p/60fps on servers with 4 vCPU cores, 14GB RAM, and GeForce RTX 3050-class hardware (6GB VRAM). Only Ready-to-Play games (over 2,000 titles) are accessible; Install-to-Play is not available.

=== Performance tier ===
The Performance tier (renamed from "Priority" in November 2024) costs $9.99/month or $99.99/year, offering 6-hour gaming sessions with no ads and priority queue access. Streaming supports up to 1440p/60fps on servers with 8 vCPU cores, 28GB RAM, and GeForce RTX 3060-class hardware (12GB VRAM). Features include ray tracing, HDR, and 5.1 surround audio. Both Ready-to-Play and Install-to-Play games are accessible (over 4,000 titles).

=== Ultimate tier ===
The Ultimate tier costs $19.99/month or $199.99/year and provides 8-hour gaming sessions with no ads and priority queue access. Members have access to RTX 4080-class servers (16 vCPU cores, 56GB RAM, 24GB VRAM) by default, with RTX 5080-class servers (56GB RAM, 48GB VRAM) automatically assigned for select optimized games. RTX 4080 servers support up to 4K resolution or up to 240fps, while RTX 5080 servers support up to 5K resolution at 120fps, or up to 360fps at 1080p with sub-30 millisecond click-to-pixel latency. Features include ray tracing, HDR, 7.1 surround audio, DLSS 3 Frame Generation, NVIDIA Reflex, and Cloud G-Sync. Both Ready-to-Play and Install-to-Play games are accessible (over 4,000 titles).

=== Day passes ===
Day passes offer 24-hour access to upgraded tiers at $3.99 (Performance) and $7.99 (Ultimate).

=== Playtime caps ===
As of January 1, 2026, all non-Founders paid subscribers face a 100-hour monthly playtime cap, which Nvidia stated affects approximately 6% of users. Additional 15-hour blocks can be purchased at $2.99 (Performance) or $5.99 (Ultimate), with up to 15 unused hours rolling over monthly. Legacy Founders members who subscribed on or before March 17, 2021, retain their introductory $4.99/month rate and are exempt from monthly playtime caps.

== Library ==
As of late 2025, GeForce NOW supports over 4,500 games through two access methods. "Ready-to-Play" games are titles that NVIDIA has pre-tested and optimized for streaming, available to all tiers including Free members. "Install-to-Play" games are additional Steam titles that users can install on-demand from their own libraries, available only to Performance and Ultimate subscribers.

=== Bring your own games model ===
GeForce Now operates on a "bring your own games" model, where users sign into their existing digital distribution accounts (Steam, Epic Games Store, Ubisoft Connect, EA App, GOG.com, Battle.net, Xbox PC Game Pass) to play games they already own. For example, if a user wants to play Fortnite on a device, it would be free as the game itself is free to play, but to play Cyberpunk 2077, the user would need to sign into a Steam or Epic Games Store account that owns that game.

=== Install-to-Play ===
Announced at Gamescom 2025, the Install-to-Play feature provides Ultimate and Performance members with 100GB of cache storage to install Steam games whose publishers have opted into Steam Cloud Play. This cache is cleared at the end of each session, requiring games to be reinstalled when starting a new session (though installation is typically fast due to the high-speed server infrastructure). This effectively doubled the accessible library from approximately 2,300 pre-tested titles to over 4,500 games. Persistent storage that survives between sessions is available via subscription add-ons (200GB/$2.99, 500GB/$4.99, 1TB/$7.99 monthly).

=== Publisher partnerships ===
Nvidia has been involved in a number of licensing rights disputes related to games on the service, especially in February and March 2020, when the service transitioned from its beta stage to its general release. Activision Blizzard pulled all their games from the service in February 2020, citing a "misunderstanding" on the terms. Bethesda pulled the majority of its games shortly afterward. The developers of The Long Dark said that their game was improperly placed on the service without any sort of licensing agreement; Nvidia agreed to remove that game as well. In the beginning of March 2020, 2K Games also pulled their products from the service.

Nvidia announced in May 2020 that they would change their approach to have developers and publishers require their games to be opted into use for the library on the GeForce Now service, starting in June 2020, though this will be a free service offered to these companies. Shortly afterwards, Valve announced that it was launching a beta of its Steam Cloud Play services for its storefront that would integrate with other cloud gaming services, including GeForce Now.

On September 30, 2021, GeForce Now announced that Electronic Arts games, including Battlefield, Mirror's Edge Catalyst, Unravel, and Dragon Age franchises, are available to play in the cloud.

In February 2023, Microsoft (which operated Xbox Cloud Gaming) announced a 10-year agreement to bring its Xbox PC games to Nvidia's GeForce Now cloud streaming service. Following the acquisition of Activision Blizzard by Microsoft, Activision Blizzard's games were added to Nvidia's service, including titles such as Call of Duty, Crash Bandicoot, Spyro, Warcraft, Diablo, and Overwatch.

Ubisoft remains a major partner, with full Ubisoft+ Premium integration. Rockstar Games removed its titles from the service in early 2020 and has not opted back in.

== Reception ==
GeForce Now has received generally positive reviews, particularly following upgrades to its server infrastructure. At launch in February 2020, reviewers favorably compared the service to rival Google Stadia, with Ars Technica calling it "a stunner" and asking "RIP Stadia?"

Following the September 2025 introduction of Blackwell RTX 5080 servers, PC Gamer noted that games felt indistinguishable from local play under optimal conditions, though 4K streaming with frame generation enabled exhibited some lag.

=== Criticism ===
The service has faced criticism on several fronts. The announcement of 100-hour monthly playtime caps for non-Founders members, effective January 2026, drew negative reactions from subscribers, particularly those who play MMORPGs or other time-intensive games. Some reviewers have noted that the Free tier is "nearly unusable" due to long queue times and advertisements.

The game library remains incomplete due to the opt-in publisher model, with notable absences including Rockstar Games titles such as Grand Theft Auto V and Red Dead Redemption 2, as well as Elden Ring from FromSoftware. First-person shooters and other latency-sensitive games can still feel sluggish compared to local play for users without optimal network conditions.

== Supported platforms ==
=== Desktop ===
GeForce Now supports Windows 10 and later (64-bit), macOS 10.15 and later, SteamOS on Steam Machine, and ChromeOS. A native Linux client for Ubuntu 24.04 and later entered beta in January 2026. Browser-based streaming via Chrome, Edge, Safari, and Opera GX supports up to 1440p/120fps through play.geforcenow.com.

=== Mobile ===
The native Android app supports up to 1600p/120fps streaming on Ultimate tier, but does not support HDR. iOS and iPadOS have no official native app due to Apple App Store restrictions on cloud gaming services; instead, access is available via Safari PWA, limited to 1080p/60fps with gamepad-only input. Third-party web browsers such as CloudGear are available on iOS that overcome Safari's limitations, enabling features such as 5K resolution, 120fps, HDR, mouse pointer lock, and controller rumble — bringing the iOS experience closer to parity with desktop clients.

=== Smart TVs and streaming devices ===
The service is available on Samsung TVs (2020–2025 models via Samsung Gaming Hub), LG TVs (2020–2025 webOS models, with 4K/120fps on 2022+ OLED models), Android TV/Sony TVs, and Nvidia Shield TV. Amazon Fire TV support (Fire TV Stick 4K Plus/Max 2nd Gen) was announced at CES 2026 for release in early 2026.

=== Gaming handhelds ===
Steam Deck gained a native app in 2025 supporting up to 90fps in handheld mode, or up to 4K/60fps when connected to an external display. Other supported handhelds include Asus ROG Ally, Lenovo Legion Go, MSI Claw, Razer Edge, and Logitech G Cloud.

=== VR and MR headsets ===
VR/MR headset support launched at CES 2025, enabling 2D cinema-mode streaming at 4K/60fps on Apple Vision Pro, Meta Quest 2/Pro/3/3S, PICO 4/4 Ultra, Steam Frame, and Valve Index via browser.

=== Controllers ===
Racing wheel support (such as Logitech G29/G920/G923/G PRO Racing Wheel/Driving Force GT/G27) is available on Windows and macOS. HOTAS flight controls (Thrustmaster/Turtle Beach/Hori/Logitech) were announced at CES 2026. Other supported controllers include Google's Stadia Controller after converted into and enabling Bluetooth mode, as well as Backbone One/Pro, Valve's first and second generations of Steam Controller, Amazon's Luna Controller, Thrustmaster's GP XID Pro, Sony's Sixaxis/DualShock 3/DualShock 4/DualSense, Hori's HORIPAD Turbo SL/Fighting Stick α (Alpha)/Fighting Stick Mini/Wireless HORIPAD/Fighting Commander OCTA, Microsoft's Xbox 360 controller, Turtle Beach's Recon Cloud Controller/Atom Controller/PDP REPLAY Wireless Controller/Victrix Pro BFG Reloaded Wireless Modular Controller/Rematch Wireless RGB Gaming Controller for PC/Stealth Flip Wireless Controller, Samsung Android GamePad, Amkette's EvoFox Deck Smartphone Gamepad/EvoFox Deck 2 Smartphone Gamepad/EvoFox Go Smartphone Bluetooth Gamepad/EvoFox Elite X Wired Gamepad for PC/EvoFox Elite X Wireless Gamepad for PC/EvoFox Elite Play Wireless Controller/EvoFox Elite Ops Wired Gamepad/EvoFox Elite Ops Wireless Gamepad/EvoFox Elite X2 Dual-Mode PC Gamepad/EvoFox Elite X2 Pro Tri Mode Wireless Gamepad/EvoFox One S 3 Mode Wireless Gamepad/EvoFox One X Tri-Mode Wireless Gamepad/EvoFox One Universal Bluetooth Gamepad/Evo Gamepad Pro 4 for Android Smartphones, SteelSeries' Stratus/Stratus XL/Nimbus/Stratus Duo/Stratus+/Nimbus+/Nimbus Cloud/Aeon Pro, Razer's Serval/Wildcat/Sabertooth/Onza/Panthera Arcade Stick/Panthera Evo Arcade Stick/Atrox Arcade Stick/Kitsune Optical Arcade Controller/Kishi Ultra/Kishi v2/Kishi v2 Pro/Prio/Wolverine v3 Pro 8K PC/Wolverine v3 Tournament Edition 8K PC/Wolverine v3 Bluetooth, GameSir's Cyclone 2 Multiplatform Controller/Tarantula Pro Multiplatform Controller/Tarantula 8K PC Wired eSports Controller for PC/Tegenaria Lite Wired Symmetric Game Controller/Super Nova Multiplatform Game Controller/Nova 2 Lite Multiplatform Wireless Game Controller/Nova Lite Multiplatform Controller/Nova HD Rumble NS Controller/G8 Plus MFi Type-C Mobile Controller/G8 Plus Bluetooth Stretchable Mobile Gamepad/G8 Galileo Stretchable Mobile Gamepad/G7 Pro 8K PC eSports Controller/G6/G5/G4s/G4 Pro/G4/G3/G2/G1/X5s Wireless Mobile Game Controller/X5 Lite Type-C Mobile Gaming Controller/X3 Pro Stretchable Mobile Gamepad With Integrated Cooler/X2s Mobile Gaming Controller/X1/T4 Pro/T4 Kaleid/T3s/T2s/T2a/T1s/M2, PowerA's OPS v1 Wireless Controller for PC and Cloud Gaming/OPS v3 Pro Wireless Controller for PC and Cloud Gaming with Lumectra, Nacon's GC-100XF/GC-200WL/GC-400ES/Revo PC/Revo PC Max, Mad Catz's C.A.T. 7/C.A.T. 9/C.A.T. 17, Nintendo's Wii Remote/Wii U Pro Controller/Switch Pro Controller/Switch 2 Pro Controller and Logitech's Wired Gamepad F310/Rumble Gamepad F510/Wireless Gamepad F710/Dual Action Gamepad/Rumblepad 2/Cordless Rumblepad 2.

== Global distribution and alliance partners ==
Nvidia's GeForce Now game streaming service leverages a network of alliance partners to expand its reach and make cloud gaming accessible to users around the globe. These partners operate the service in their respective regions, tailoring offerings based on local market dynamics. The service is available in over 100 countries through direct operations and alliance partnerships.

=== Nvidia-operated regions ===
Nvidia directly operates datacenters serving North America (United States, Canada, Mexico), South America (Brazil, Argentina, Uruguay, Bolívia, etc.) Western and Northern Europe (United Kingdom, Ireland, France, Germany, Switzerland, Austria, Liechtenstein, Spain, Portugal, Netherlands, Monaco, Italy, Andorra, Belgium, Nordic countries), Central and Eastern Europe (Poland, Czech Republic, Slovakia, Hungary, Romania, Balkans, Baltics), Morocco, Tunisia, Israel, Japan, Mongolia and India.

=== Alliance partners ===
As of January 2026, the following Alliance partners operate GeForce NOW in their respective regions. Alliance partners set their own pricing and subscription tiers, which often differ from those offered by NVIDIA's first-party service.

==== Asia-Pacific ====
- GFN.CO.KR: South Korea
- Taiwan Mobile: Taiwan, Hong Kong, Macau, Philippines
- StarHub (formerly): Singapore, Indonesia, Philippines, Vietnam, Malaysia, Thailand
- Yes: Malaysia
- Brothers Pictures: Thailand
- Cloud.GG: Australia, New Zealand

==== Europe and Central Asia ====
- GFN.AM: Armenia, Azerbaijan, Georgia, Kazakhstan, Moldova, Ukraine, Uzbekistan
- GAME+: Turkey, Cyprus

==== Middle East and Africa ====
- Rain: South Africa

==== Latin America ====
- ABYA: Argentina, Brazil, Chile, Paraguay, Uruguay
- Digevo: Chile, Colombia, Peru

== See also ==
- Cloud gaming
- Xbox Cloud Gaming
- Amazon Luna
- PlayStation Now
- Steam Link
- Boosteroid
- Shadow (service)
- AirConsole
- OnLive
- Gaikai
