= Amazon Fire TV =

Line of digital media players and microconsoles by Amazon

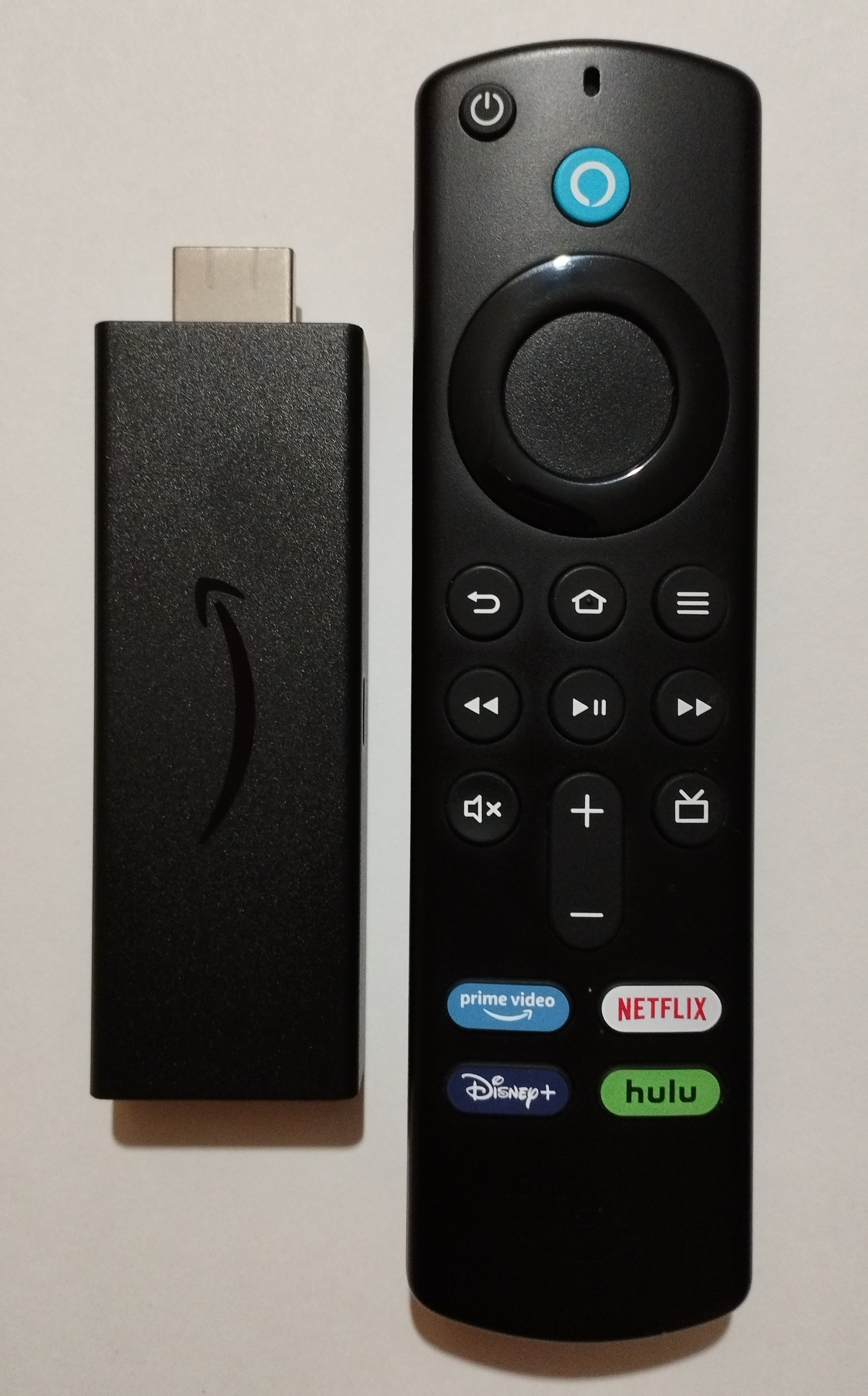
- Third generation Fire TV Stick with the newer Alexa Voice Remote
- Also known as: Fire TV with 4K Ultra HD and Alexa
- Developer: Amazon
- Manufacturer: Foxconn
- Type: Digital media player, microconsole
- Generation: 3rd
- Released: USA: April 12, 2014; DEU: September 25, 2014; UK: October 23, 2014; JPN: October 28, 2014; IND: April 19, 2017; CAN: October 31, 2018; FRA: September 5, 2019; ESP: September 5, 2019; ITA: September 5, 2019; MEX: September 23, 2020; BRA: September 23, 2020; AU: September 23, 2020; POL: November 17, 2021
- Introductory price: US$99
- Operating system: Original: Fire OS 5 "Bellini"; Current: Fire OS 8 or Vega OS
- System on a chip: Qualcomm Snapdragon 600 APQ8064T; MediaTek MT8173C (2nd Gen)
- CPU: Qualcomm Krait 300, quad-core up to 1.7 GHz (1st generation) dual-core ARM Cortex-A72 up to 2 GHz and dual-core ARM Cortex-A53 up to 1.573 GHz (2nd generation)
- Memory: 2 GB LPDDR2 RAM
- Storage: 8 GB internal
- Display: 1080p and 4K
- Graphics: Qualcomm Adreno 320 (1st Gen), 51.2 GFLOPS; PowerVR GX6250 (2nd Gen), 57.6 GFLOPS
- Sound: Dolby Digital Plus 7.1 surround sound
- Connectivity: HDMI, Bluetooth 4.0, Bluetooth 4.1, USB 2.0, Wi-Fi (802.11a/b/g/n/ac), 10/100 Ethernet, Fire game controller
- Power: 5.5 mm (0.22 in) DC (6.25 V 2.5 A power adapter)
- Current firmware: 6.2.1.2
- Dimensions: 115 × 115 × 17.5 mm (4.53 × 4.53 × 0.69 in)
- Weight: 281 g (9.9 oz)
- Related: Amazon Fire, Amazon Luna
- Website: amazon.com

The former logo of Fire TV

Amazon Fire TV (formerly stylized as amazon fireTV) is a line of digital media players and microconsoles developed by Amazon since April 12, 2014. The devices are small network appliances that deliver digital audio and video content streamed via the Internet to a connected high-definition television. They also allow users to access local content and to play video games with the included remote control or another game controller, or by using a mobile app remote control on another device.

The device is available in several forms, one being a set-top box, of which the current model is the Fire TV Cube with embedded Amazon Echo smart speaker (which effectively replaced the original Fire TV box model). Recently, Amazon released a soundbar with Fire TV directly integrated in it. Another product is a HDMI plug-in stick with, in general, lesser specifications than the contemporaneous boxes; these are offered in the entry-level Fire TV Stick HD, the Fire TV Stick Lite, the standard Fire TV Stick, and the high-end Fire TV Stick 4K and Fire TV Stick 4K Max (the third of which effectively replaced the third-generation "pendant" Fire TV). Additionally, Amazon licenses the Fire OS and Fire TV interface to be embedded and built into certain television sets from third parties sold to the public, labeled as Fire TV Edition.

== Fire TV hardware ==
=== Original model ===
==== First generation ====
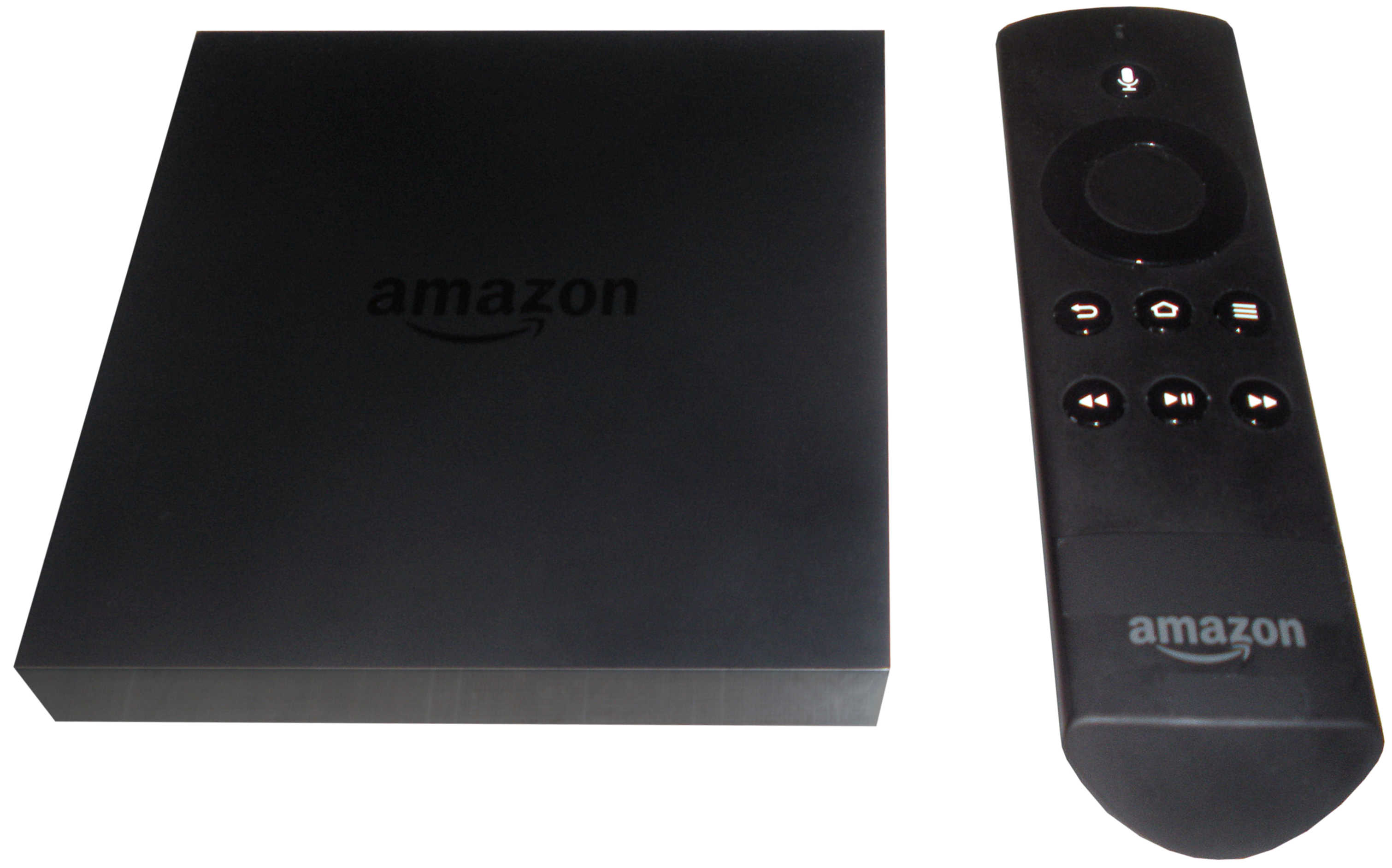
Amazon Fire TV with remote (first generation)

The first Fire TV was made available for purchase in the United States on the same day of the April 12, 2014 announcement for US$99 and was launched with a video game called Sev Zero. Codenamed "Bueller", after the eponymous character from Ferris Bueller's Day Off, it offered HDMI audio, with support for Dolby Digital Plus 7.1 surround sound pass-through, if the user's Internet bandwidth was sufficient. According to Amazon, the Fire TV was designed to outpace competitors like the Apple TV and Roku in performance: the 0.72-inch-thick box featured a 1.7 GHz quad-core CPU (Qualcomm Snapdragon 8064), 2 GB of RAM and 8 GB of internal storage, along with a MIMO dual-band radio for 1080p streaming over 802.11a/b/g/n Wi-Fi and a 10/100 Ethernet connection and USB 2.0 port. Included with the box is a Bluetooth remote control with a microphone for voice search.

The company said that it did not intend the Fire TV to compete with gaming consoles; instead, its gaming capabilities were geared toward people who did not already own a console but may play games on a smartphone or tablet. It has a dedicated controller accessory.

==== Second generation ====
Amazon released a second-generation Fire TV, codenamed "Sloane", after the film love interest of Ferris Bueller, in late 2015. This version had 4K resolution support, improved processor performance, and a MediaTek 8173C chipset to support H.265 (HEVC), VP8, and VP9 codecs. Wireless hardware upgrades included 4K capable, a dual-band 802.11a/b/g/n/ac Wi-Fi with 2 × 2 MIMO and Bluetooth 4.1. It was effectively replaced with the Fire TV Cube.

==== Third generation ====
The third-generation Fire TV, also known as the Fire TV with 4K Ultra HD and Alexa Voice Remote, was released on October 25, 2017. It eschewed the previous set-top box design for a small, diamond-shaped "pendant" reminiscent of the Fire TV Stick, which plugs directly into a television set's HDMI port and can be hung from a short HDMI extender cable. It contained a slower processor but more RAM than the second-generation Fire TV, and also had support for 4K resolution streaming, Dolby Atmos, and HDR10, but dropped support for Miracast. Production was discontinued in 2018 in favor of the Fire TV Stick 4K.

=== Fire TV Cube ===
The Fire TV Cube was released on June 7, 2018. It is similar in function to the third-generation Fire TV but also includes embedded Alexa functionality similar to the Amazon Echo smart speaker line and can use HDMI-CEC and an IR blaster to control other devices with voice commands. As its voice functionality is integrated into the device, the Fire TV Cube's included remote does not include voice capability. The device uses a 1.5 GHz quad-core ARM 4xCA53 processor, 2 GB RAM, and 16 GB storage.

==== Second generation ====
A second-generation model was unveiled on September 4, 2019, featuring a hexa-core processor, "Local Voice Control" (which allows client-side recognition of common voice commands to improve response time), and support for Dolby Vision and HDR10+. It supports 4K output.

==== Third generation ====
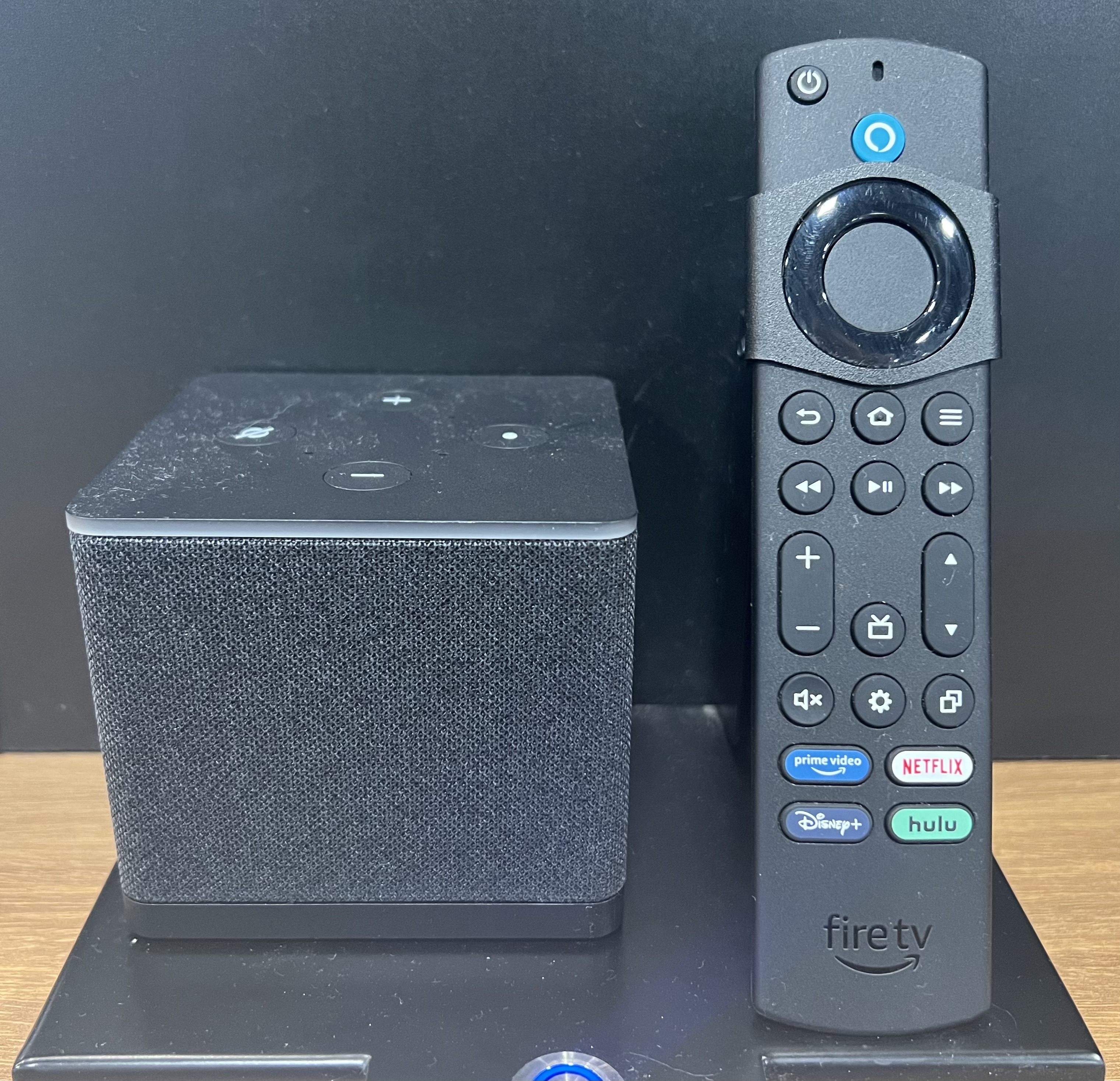
Amazon Fire TV Cube 3rd generation

A third-generation model of the Fire TV Cube was announced on September 28, 2022, for release on October 25, 2022. Notable upgrades to the 3rd-generation model include an octa-core processor (4 × 2.2 GHz 4 × 2.0 GHz), support for Wi-Fi 6E (IEEE 802.11ax) networking, and Bluetooth 5.0+LE.

=== Fire TV Stick ===
On November 19, 2014, Amazon released its Fire TV Stick, a smaller dongle version of the Fire TV that plugs into an HDMI port. Codenamed "Montoya", it retains much of the functionality of the larger Fire TV. It has 1 GB of RAM, 8 GB of internal storage, weighs 0.9 oz (26 g), and it uses a Broadcom BCM28155 1.0 GHz Cortex-A9 processor and a Broadcom VideoCore IV GPU. Wireless hardware includes a dual-band 802.11 a/b/g/n Wi-Fi with 2 × 2 MIMO and Bluetooth 3.0. The Fire TV Stick is bundled with a remote control, in either of two variants: one with Alexa voice search and one without Alexa.

==== Second generation ====
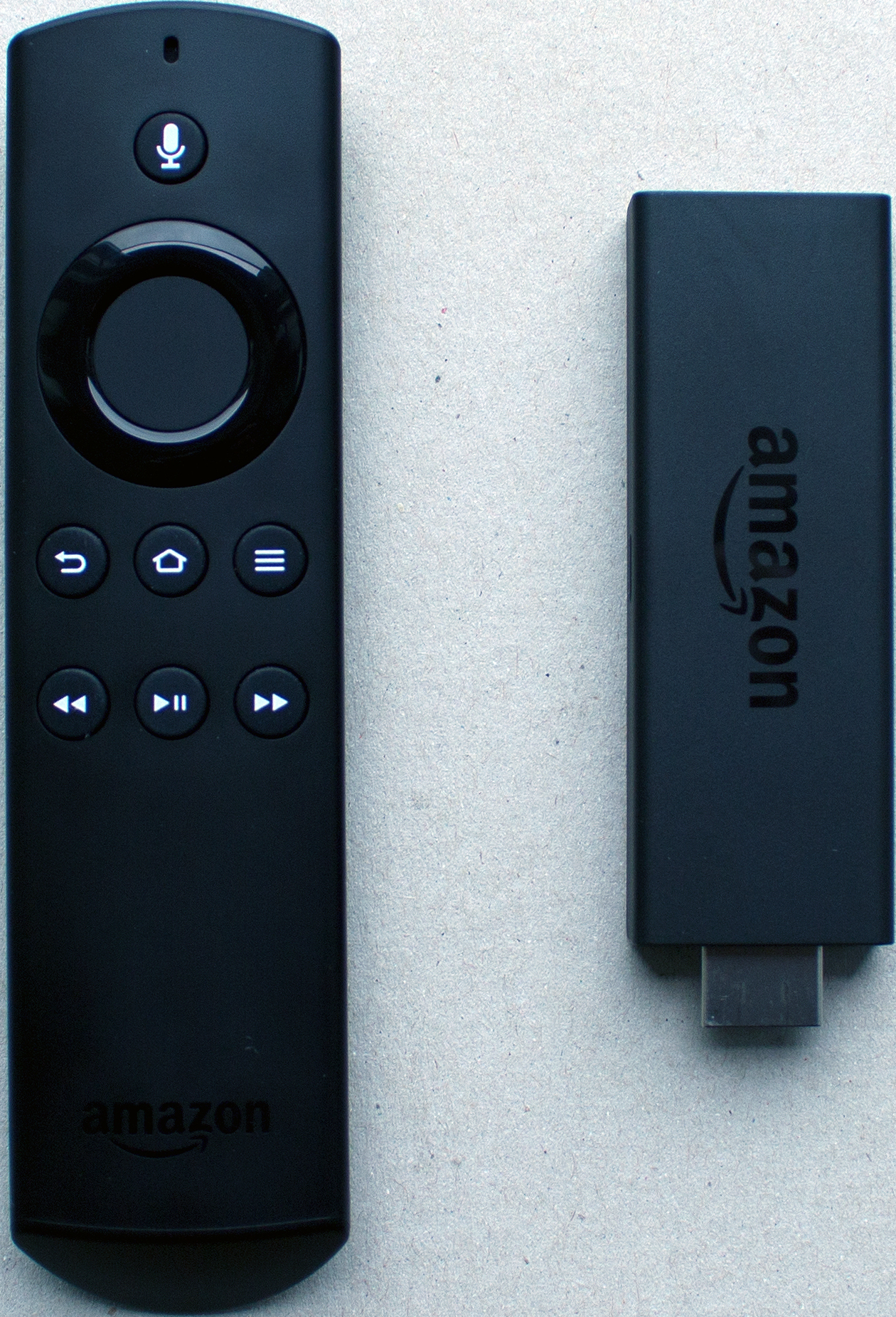
Second generation Fire TV Stick with Alexa remote (with voice search)

On October 20, 2016, Amazon released the Fire TV Stick with Alexa Voice Remote, codenamed "Tank". Other than the new remote, the updates include MediaTek MT8127D Quad-core ARM 1.3 GHz processor with a Mali-450 MP4 GPU, and support for the H.265 (HEVC) codec. Wireless hardware upgrades includes a dual-band 802.11a/b/g/n/ac Wi-Fi with 2 × 2 MIMO and Bluetooth 4.1. It retains the 1GB of RAM and 8GB of storage and weighs slightly more at 1.1 oz (31 g).

On January 15, 2019, the second-generation Fire TV Stick was re-issued with the updated remote from the 4K model.

==== Third generation ====
On October 15, 2020, a third generation Fire TV Stick models were released. The Fire TV Stick model includes a remote with TV control buttons where the Fire TV Stick Lite model's remote does not include TV controls. Both models include similar internal hardware as the Fire TV Stick 4K, except for a maximum output resolution of 1080p and only 1 GB of RAM. In 2021, the third-generation Fire TV Stick was re-issued with an updated remote "3rd Gen Alexa Voice Remote".

=== Fire TV Stick HD ===
On October 17, 2024, Amazon released the Fire TV Stick HD; replacing the previous models.

==== Second generation ====
On April 29th, 2026, Amazon released the 2nd generation Fire TV Stick HD; replacing the 1st generation with Vega OS.

=== Fire TV Stick 4K ===
On October 31, 2018, Amazon unveiled the Fire TV Stick 4K, codenamed "Mantis," which "effectively replaces Amazon’s Fire TV pendant." It is upgraded to a 1.7 GHz quad-core processor, 1.5 GB RAM, and supports 4K output, HDR10+ and Dolby Vision, Dolby Atmos, hardware-accelerated MPEG-2 decoding, and Miracast through a later update. It also includes an updated voice remote that contains an infrared emitter and buttons for controlling TV power and volume (which can also be controlled with voice commands). The remote is backward compatible with previous Fire TV models, and also sold separately as an upgrade.

==== Second generation ====
On October 18, 2023, Amazon released their second generation Fire TV Stick 4K. Notable changes include increase to 2 GB of RAM, an updated MediaTek CPU, and hardware AV1 video decoding support. It was later renamed on October 16, 2025, to the Fire TV Stick 4K Plus.

==== Third generation ====
On September 30, 2026, Amazon released their third generation Fire TV Stick 4K with Vega OS.

=== Fire TV Stick 4K Max ===
On October 7, 2021, Amazon released the Fire TV Stick 4K Max. It includes the updated 3rd gen Alexa Voice Remote, and has Wi-Fi 6 support. It has a 1.8 GHz Quad-core processor, a 750 MHz GPU, and came with 8GB flash storage. It also has Dolby Vision / Dolby Atmos support. The 4K Max is the first in the line with hardware accelerated AV1 video streaming support.

==== Second generation ====
On October 18, 2023, Amazon released their second generation Fire TV Stick 4K Max. Notable improvements include a slightly improved MediaTek 2.0 GHz CPU, an increase to 16 GB of flash storage and Wi-Fi 6E support.

=== Fire TV Stick 4K Select ===
On September 30, 2025, Amazon announced the Fire TV Stick 4K Select. Unlike previous generations which ran the Android-based Fire OS, the Fire TV Stick 4K Select runs Vega OS, a proprietary, web-centric operating system based on Linux. It uses a MediaTek 1.7 GHz Quad-core CPU and has 1 GB of RAM.

== Fire TV Edition ==
Fire TV Edition is the product name applied to smart television sets produced by major television manufacturers that include Amazon Fire OS and the Fire TV interface, licensed from Amazon. They offer basic live television program information and minimal recording capabilities. Fire TV Edition television models are available from Best Buy's house brand Insignia and Toshiba (in U.S. and Canadian markets), along with Xiaomi, JVC and Grundig (in European markets), as well as Panasonic, TCL and Hisense.

== Fire TV Recast ==
The Fire TV Recast is a digital video recorder that works with an over-the-air antenna to record shows for later viewing on a Fire TV or an Amazon Echo Show device. It was announced in September 2018 and began shipping in the United States on November 14, 2018.

On August 15, 2022, Amazon confirmed the discontinuation of the Fire TV Recast. Among the downsides: Content stored on a Recast cannot be viewed using other major streaming devices, such as Roku, Apple TV, or Chromecast, limiting its appeal; it also never gained the ability to skip commercials during playback.

== Software ==
Screenshot of Fire TV OS 7.6, after setting it up for the first time

The Fire TV series runs Fire OS, which is derived from Android Open Source Project source code. It supports voice commands via either a remote control with an embedded microphone, or integrated microphones inside the device (as is the case of the Fire TV Cube), and can also be controlled with Alexa via Amazon Echo smart speakers. The devices support various Amazon-owned services, including Amazon Prime Video, Twitch, Amazon Freevee, MX Player, Amazon Music and Amazon Luna, as well as other major third-party services, including Netflix, YouTube, YouTube Kids, YouTube TV, The Roku Channel, Fox One, Howdy, Curiosity Stream, Mubi, Dekkoo, Ameba TV, YuppTV, Chorki, Eros Now, the Apple TV app, Hallmark+, ZEE5, SonyLIV, Crunchyroll, DAZN, Dailymotion, Peacock, Hulu, Hotstar, Disney+, Tubi, Vimeo, HBO Max, Discovery+, Joyn, Philo, Paramount+, Pluto TV, FuboTV, iWant, Sun NXT, WOW Presents Plus, Spotify, TuneIn, iHeartRadio, Tidal, Audacy, BBC Sounds, Qello, Plex, Emby, Jellyfin, Xbox Cloud Gaming, GeForce Now, Steam Link, Boosteroid, AirConsole and others via Amazon Appstore.

The "X-Ray" feature allows users to view contextual information related to Prime Video content (such as biographies of actors and other trivia), using face recognition, music recognition, and IMDb data.

Most Fire TV devices allow screen mirroring and casting from Miracast or (only on Fire TV Edition sets) AirPlay devices. Third-party applications such as AirScreen can allow AirPlay and Google Cast to be used. Amazon are currently also adding support for a new protocol named Matter Casting.

In November 2023, a report surfaced of Amazon's plans to migrate away from Android to a custom Linux-based operating system known as Vega OS.

== Models ==
Previous generation	Current generation

Model		Fire TV (box)	Fire TV Stick	Fire TV (box)	Fire TV Stick	Fire TV (pendant)	Fire TV Cube	Fire TV Stick 4K	Fire TV Cube	Fire TV Stick	Fire TV Stick 4K Max	Fire TV Cube	Fire TV Stick 4K	Fire TV Stick 4K Max	Fire TV Stick HD	Fire TV Stick 4K Select	Fire TV Stick 4K Plus
Model generation		1st	1st	2nd	2nd	3rd	1st	1st	2nd	3rd	1st	3rd	2nd	2nd	1st	1st	1st
Code name		Bueller	Montoya	Sloane	Tank	Needle	Stark	Mantis	Raven	Sheldon	Kara	Gazelle		Karat			
Model name		AFTB	AFTM	AFTS	AFTT	AFTN	AFTA	AFTMM	AFTR	AFTSSS/AFTSS	AFTKA	AFTGAZL	AFTKM	AFTKRT	B0CQN8PP9G	AFTCA002	AFTMA08C15
Model No.		CL1130	W87CUN	DV83YW	LY73PR	LDC9WZ	EX69VW	E9L29Y	A78V3N	S3L46N	K2R2TE	GA5Z9L	M3N6RA	K3R6AT	S3L46N	AFTKM	AFTMA08C15
Release date		April 12, 2014	November 19, 2014	September 29, 2015	October 20, 2016	October 25, 2017	June 21, 2018	October 31, 2018	October 10, 2019	September 30, 2020	October 7, 2021	October 25, 2022	September 27, 2023		October 17, 2024	October 15, 2025	October 16, 2025
MPN		B00CX5P8FC	B00KAKPZYG	B00U3FPN4U	B01ETRGSPA	B01N32NCPM	B01NBTFNVA	B079QHMFWC	B07KGVB6D6	B07ZZVX1F2 B08C1W5N87 (Lite)	B08MQZXN1X	B09BZZ3MM7	B0BP9MDCQZ	B0BP9SNVH9	B0CQN8PP9G	B0CN41YQKQ	B0F7Z4QZTT
OS		Fire OS 5				Fire OS 6			Fire OS 7				Fire OS 8		Fire OS 7	Vega OS	Fire OS 8
Android Version		5.1				7.1			9				11		9	—N/a	11
System Version		5.2.7.4	5.2.9.3	5.2.9.5		6.7.1.0	6.7.1.0	6.7.1.1	7.7.1.4	7.7.1.5	7.7.1.4	7.7.1.5	8.1.8.0		7.7.1.5	1.1	8.1.8.0
CPU	Maker	Qualcomm	Broadcom	MediaTek		Amlogic		MediaTek	Amlogic	MediaTek		Amlogic	MediaTek				
CPU	Family	Snapdragon 600	?	Quad-core ARM big.LITTLE	?	ARM Cortex-A53		ARM Cortex-A53	ARM Cortex-A73	ARM Cortex-A53	ARM Cortex-A55	ARM Cortex-A73	ARM Cortex-A55		ARM Cortex-A53	ARM Cortex-A55	ARM Cortex-A55
CPU	Model	APQ8064T	BCM28155	MT8173C	MT8127D	S905Z		MT8695	S922X	MT8695D	MT8696	POP1-G	MT8696D	MT8696T	MT8695D	MT8698	MT8696D
CPU	Cores	4x Krait 300 @ 1.7 GHz	2x ARM Cortex-A9 @ 1.0 GHz	2x ARM Cortex-A72 @ 2 GHz and 2x ARM Cortex-A53 @1.573 GHz	4x ARM Cortex-A7 @ 1.3 GHz	4x ARM Cortex-A53 @ 1.5 GHz		4x ARM Cortex-A53 @1.7GHz	4x ARM Cortex-A73 @ 2.2 GHz and 2x ARM Cortex-A53 @1.9 GHz	4x ARM Cortex-A53 @1.7GHz	4x ARM Cortex-A55 @1.8GHz	4x ARM Cortex-A73 @ 2.2 GHz and 4x ARM Cortex-A53 @2.0 GHz	4x ARM Cortex-A55 @1.7GHz	4x ARM Cortex-A55 @2.0GHz	4x ARM Cortex-A53	4x ARM Cortex-A55	4x ARM Cortex-A55 @1.7GHz
CPU	Width	32-bit		64-bit	32-bit	64-bit											
Application Binary Interface (ABI)		32-bit															
GPU	Designer	Qualcomm	Broadcom	Imagination Technologies	ARM			Imagination Technologies	ARM	Imagination Technologies		ARM	Imagination Technologies			ARM	Imagination Technologies
GPU	Family	Adreno	VideoCore IV	PowerVR	Mali			PowerVR	Mali	PowerVR		Mali	PowerVR			Mali	PowerVR
GPU	Model	320	Capri VC4	GX6250	450 MP4	450 MP3		IMG GE8300	G52 MP2 (3EE) @ 800 MHz	IMG GE8300	IMG GE9215 @ 750 MHz	G52 MP8 @ 800 MHz	IMG GE9215 @ 650 MHz	IMG GE9215 @ 850 MHz	IMG GE8300	G310v2 @ 500 MHz	GE9215 @ 650 MHz
GPU	OpenGL ES	3.0	2.0	3.1	2.0			3.2								3.1	3.2
GPU	Vulkan	—N/a	—N/a	1.0	—N/a	?		1.1	1.0	1.1	1.3	1.0	?	?	1.2	?	?
GPU	OpenCL	1.1 embedded profile	—N/a	1.2	—N/a	?		1.2	2.0	1.2	2.0				1.2	?	?
Hardware Decode Support		MPEG-4, H.263, H.264		MPEG-4, H.263, H.264, H.265, VP8, VP9	MPEG-4, H.263, H.264, H.265	MPEG-4, H.264, H.265, VP9		MPEG-4, MPEG-2, H.263, H.264, H.265, VP8, VP9			MPEG-4, MPEG-2, H.263, H.264, H.265, VP8, VP9, AV1	MPEG-4, MPEG-2, H.264, H.265, VP9, AV1	MPEG-4, MPEG-2, H.263, H.264, H.265, VP8, VP9, AV1		MPEG-4, MPEG-2, H.263, H.264, H.265, VP8, VP9	MPEG-4, MPEG-2, H.264. H.265, VP8, VP9, AV1	MPEG-4, MPEG-2, H.263, H.264, H.265, VP8, VP9, AV1
RAM		2 GB LPDDR2	1 GB LPDDR2 (512 MB system, 512 MB video)	2 GB LPDDR3	1 GB LPDDR3	2 GB		1.5 GB DDR4	2 GB DDR4	1 GB DDR4	2 GB DDR4	2 GB LPDDR4X	2 GB LPDDR4		1 GB DDR4	1 GB LPDDR4	2 GB LPDDR4
Storage	Internal	8 GB NAND Flash					16 GB	8 GB	16 GB	8 GB		16 GB	8 GB	16 GB	8 GB		
Storage	External	USB up to 128 GB	No	Up to 128 GB microSDXC	Micro USB	No	Micro USB					USB-A	Micro USB			?	?
Microphone		Mic button on remote	No	Mic button on remote													
Networking	Ethernet	RJ45, 10/100 Mbit/s	USB-to-RJ45 adapter (separate)	RJ45, 10/100 Mbit/s	USB-to-RJ45 adapter (separate)		USB-to-RJ45 adapter (included)	USB-to-RJ45 adapter (separate)	USB-to-RJ45 adapter (included)	USB-to-RJ45 adapter (separate)		RJ45, 10/100 Mbit/s	USB-to-RJ45 adapter (separate)				
Networking	Bluetooth	Bluetooth 4.0; HID, SPP Profiles	Bluetooth 3.0; HID, SPP Profiles	Bluetooth 4.1; HID, HFP, SPP profiles	Bluetooth 4.1; A2DP, AVRCP, GAVDP, HID, IOPT profiles	Bluetooth 4.2 + LE; A2DP 1.2-SRC, AVRCP 1.0-TG, HID 1.0-Host, HOGP 1.0-Host	Bluetooth 4.2	Bluetooth 5.0 + LE					Bluetooth 5.2 + BLE		Bluetooth 5.0 + LE	Bluetooth 5.0 + BLE	Bluetooth 5.2 + BLE
Networking	Wi-Fi	Dual-band 802.11 a/b/g/n 2x2 MIMO		Dual-band 802.11 a/b/g/n/ac 2x2 MIMO dual-antenna							Dual-band 802.11 a/b/g/n/ac/ax 2x2 MIMO dual-antenna	Tri-band 802.11 a/b/g/n/ac/ax 2x2 MIMO dual-antenna	Dual-band 802.11 a/b/g/n/ac/ax 2x2 MIMO dual-antenna	Tri-band 802.11 a/b/g/n/ac/ax 2x2 MIMO dual-antenna	Dual-band 802.11 a/b/g/n/ac 2x2 MIMO dual-antenna		Dual-band 802.11 a/b/g/n/ac/ax 2x2 MIMO dual-antenna
Dimensions		115 mm x 115 mm x 17.5 mm	84.9 mm x 25.0 mm x 11.5 mm	115 mm x 115 mm x 17.8 mm 4.5" x 4.5" x 0.7"	85.9 mm x 30.0 mm x 12.6 mm 3.4" x 1.2" x 0.5"	65.0 mm x 65.0 mm x 15.0 mm 2.6” x 2.6” x 0.6”	86.1 mm x 86.1 mm x 76.9 mm 3.4” x 3.4” x 3.0”	108 mm x 30 mm x 14 mm	86.1 mm x 86.1 mm x 76.9 mm 3.4” x 3.4” x 3.0”	108 mm x 30 mm x 14 mm		86 mm x 86 mm x 77 mm	108 mm x 30 mm x 14 mm		108 mm x 30 mm x 14 mm	?	?
Power Supply		6.25 V, 2.5 A, 16 W, DC	5 V, 1 A, 5 W, DC	15 V, 1.4 A, 21 W, DC	5 V, 1 A, 5 W, DC	5.2 V, 1.8 A, 9 W, DC		5.25 V, 1 A, 5 W, DC	12 V, 1.25 A, 15 W, DC	5.25 V, 1 A, 5 W, DC		12 V, 1.25 A, 15 W, DC	5.25 V, 1 A, 5 W, DC			?	?
Power Plug		5.5 mm (outer) x 2.5 mm (inner) (Coaxial power connector)	USB micro-B Cable and USB A-Type Power source	3 mm (outer) x 1 mm (inner)	USB micro-B Cable and USB A-Type Power source			USB micro-B Cable and USB A-Type Power source	4 mm (outer) x 1.7 mm (inner)	USB micro-B Cable and USB A-Type Power source		4 mm (outer) x 1.7 mm (inner)	USB micro-B Cable and USB A-Type Power source			?	?

== Reception ==
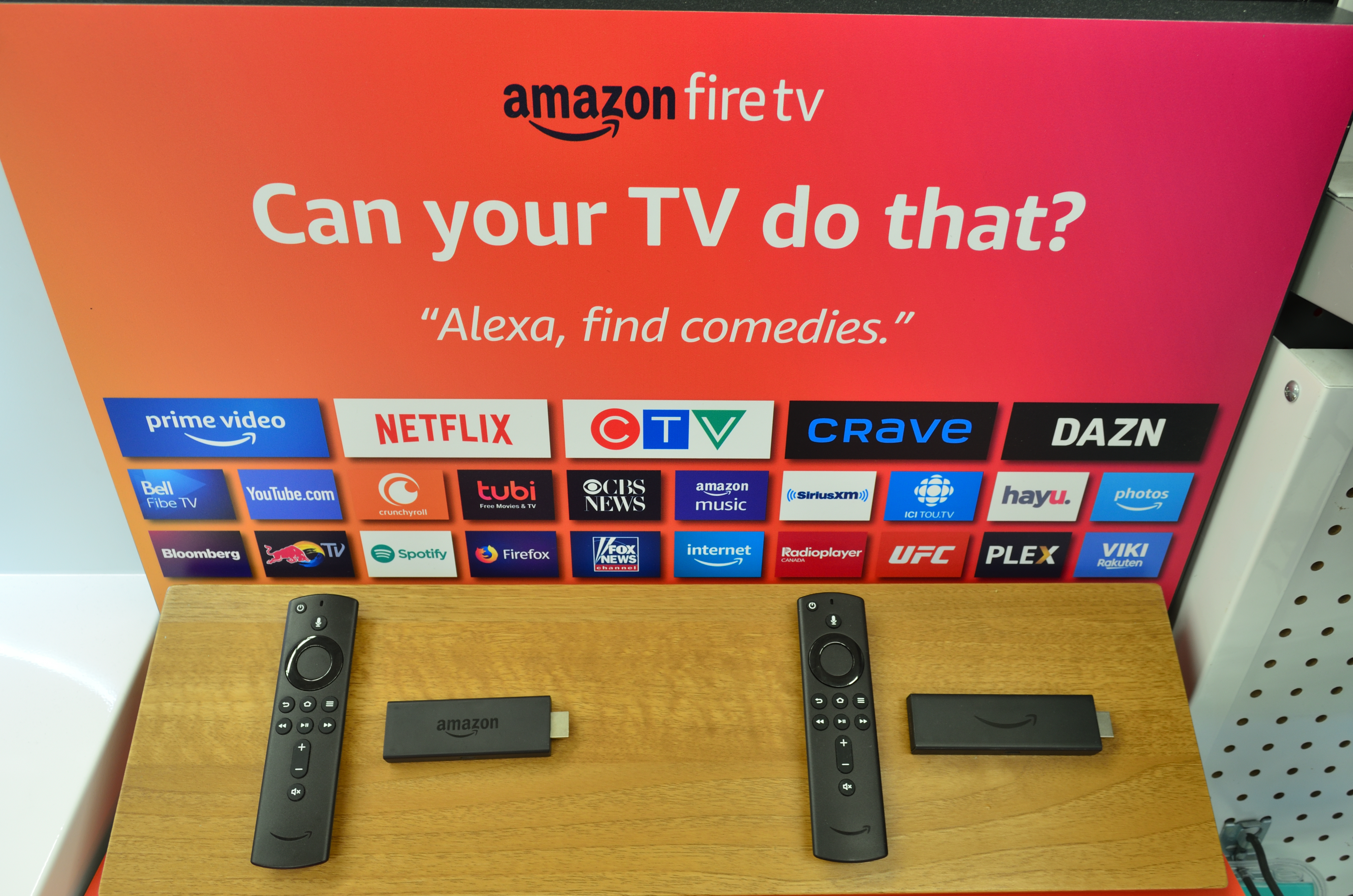
Amazon Fire TV at a retail store in Canada

Dan Seifert from The Verge reviewed Fire TV on April 4, 2014, giving it an 8.8/10 rating and largely praising its functionality and future potential. Dave Smith from ReadWrite wrote, "Fire TV aims to be the cure for what ails TV set-top boxes." GeekWire editor Andy Liu's review is headlined "Amazon's Fire TV sets a new bar for streaming boxes."

Ars Technica praised the device for specifications that surpassed competitors, good build quality, and a microphone that works very well if you use Amazon content. The reviewer disliked the fact that its media browser puts Amazon content in the front, which makes other applications less convenient to use, limited game selection with many games not optimized, and only 5.16 GB of free space, which limits the number of games that can be installed.

== Controversies ==
=== Use for illegal streaming ===
Fire TV Sticks customized with software for online piracy, colloquially called dodgy sticks, have been available for sale on online marketplaces and social media services during the 2020s, This has led to arrests of individuals selling them, including an England-wide series of arrests in late 2025. Nick Herm, the chief operating officer of Sky UK estimated in 2025 that such devices were responsible for half of such copyright infringement in the United Kingdom. Some devices modified for this purpose have also reportedly included malware used for activities including identity theft of the buyers.

== See also ==
- Android TV – Android operating system version for television sets and digital media players
- Chromecast – Line of digital media players developed by Google
- Roku – Brand of streaming media players
- Stick PC – Computer plugged into an HDMI video port
- Comparison of digital media players
- Smart TV
