= Amazon Luna =

Cloud gaming and streaming service

- Developer: Amazon
- Type: Cloud gaming service
- Launched: United States: March 1, 2022; Canada & EU: March 22, 2023
- Operating systems: Fire TV, Fire tablets, Samsung smart TVs and smart monitors, LG smart TVs and smart monitors, Windows, macOS, ChromeOS, iOS, iPadOS, Android (as a web app)
- Status: Active
- Pricing model: Monthly subscription
- Website: amazon.com/luna

Amazon Luna is a cloud gaming platform developed and operated by Amazon. The platform has integration with Twitch and is available on Windows, macOS, ChromeOS, Amazon Fire TV, iOS and iPadOS (as a progressive web app) as well as Android. Games and channels from brands such as Ubisoft+ and Jackbox Games are accessed via the Luna+ paid subscription.

Luna uses the Windows Server operating system and Nvidia Tesla T4 graphics cards from Amazon Web Services for streaming games, and is available in the United States, Austria, Canada, France, Germany, Italy, the Netherlands, Poland, Spain, United Kingdom, Sweden, Portugal, Belgium, and Luxembourg. Luna's competitors include other cloud gaming platforms like Boosteroid, Xbox Cloud Gaming, PlayStation Plus cloud streaming, and GeForce Now.

== History ==
Luna had a soft launch with early access to invited subscribers only on October 20, 2020. In its early access state, Amazon Luna featured about 100 different games combined with an introductory price of $5.99 a month. Luna subscribers have access to Ubisoft and Epic Games titles the same day they release through their respective channels. The Ubisoft+ channel costs an additional $14.99 per month. The Epic Games titles, such as Fortnite are free, but require purchasing a copy of a game.

On October 1, 2025, Amazon rebranded its Prime Gaming (formerly Twitch Prime) services under the Amazon Luna label.

In April 2026, Amazon announced significant changes to the platform, including the removal of previously purchased games and third-party subscriptions, giving users until 10 June 2026 to access titles bought before 10 April, after which they would be removed from libraries without refunds.

in July 2026, Amazon integrated Luna into Prime Video app of Fire TV devices in the United States and United Kingdom, allowing Prime members to stream games from a Games tab at no extra cost.

== Features ==
=== System requirements ===
The Amazon Luna web app supports Windows, macOS, ChromeOS, Android, iOS, Fire TV Devices (FireOS 5, Vega OS 1.1 or newer), Fire Tablets (2018 or newer), Samsung smart TVs (2020 or newer), LG smart TVs (2021 or newer), and Comcast Devices. A minimum internet speed of 10 Mbps, and 5 GHz wireless connection or wired Ethernet connection is recommended.

The officially supported web browsers are Google Chrome, Microsoft Edge, and Apple Safari. Other web browsers (such as Firefox, Opera) may display an unsupported error message, but this can be bypassed with user agent spoofing by making a web browser identify itself as Chrome.

=== Games ===
Luna has a library of over 100 games that can be accessed with the purchase of a subscription.

=== Controllers ===
Luna Controller
- Manufacturer: Amazon
- Type: Video game controller
- Released: March 1, 2022
- Input: 2 analog sticks; 2 analog triggers (LT, RT); 2 shoulder buttons (LB, RB); 8 digital buttons (A, B, X, Y, Action, Menu, Microphone, Home); D-Pad

Luna supports control through keyboard and mouse, the Xbox Wireless Controller, Xbox Elite Wireless Controller, Xbox Adaptive Controller and the DualShock 4 and DualSense controllers.

The Luna Controller is an optional accessory at the additional cost of $59.99. The controller has dual analog sticks, a D-pad, two sets of shoulder buttons, four main A/B/X/Y face buttons, three other face buttons (Action, Menu, Microphone), and the home button (represented by the Luna symbol). The color of the controller is black. A microphone is built in, which supports Amazon Alexa. The controller can connect through Wi-Fi, Bluetooth, or a USB-C cable.

USB connections can be used on Windows, Mac, Android, iOS, and Chromebook. Earlier iOS devices that have a Lightning port instead of a USB-C port require the Apple Lightning to USB 3 Camera Adapter to handle USB OTG connections.

Supported controllers	Connection method	Controller input API	Notes
Mouse and keyboard	USB, Bluetooth	—N/a	In Luna Couch sessions, guests have to ask the host to manually enable keyboard support for local co-op games.
Third-party controllers (e.g Logitech F310, F710, G923, G PRO Racing Wheel, RS50, Gamevice, Razer Kishi v3, Kishi v3 Pro, Kishi v3 Pro XL, Kishi v2, Kishi v2 Pro, Kishi Ultra, Prio, Wolverine v3 Pro 8K PC, Wolverine v3 Tournament Edition 8K PC, Wolverine v3 Bluetooth, GameSir Cyclone 2 Multiplatform Controller, Tarantula Pro Multiplatform Controller, Tarantula 8K PC Wired eSports Controller for PC, Tegenaria Lite Wired Symmetric Game Controller, Super Nova Multiplatform Game Controller, Nova 2 Lite Multiplatform Wireless Game Controller, Nova Lite Multiplatform Controller, Nova HD Rumble NS Controller, G8 Plus MFi Type-C Mobile Controller, G8 Plus Bluetooth Stretchable Mobile Gamepad, G7 Pro 8K PC eSports Controller, X2s Mobile Gaming Controller, T4 Pro, T4 Kaleid, Mad Catz C.A.T. 9, C.A.T. 17, Hori Fighting Commander OCTA, HORIPAD Turbo SL, Wireless HORIPAD, Backbone One/Pro, Thrustmaster GP XID Pro, Nacon Revo PC, Revo PC Max, Turtle Beach Recon Cloud Controller, Atom Controller, Racer Wireless Racing Wheel, PDP REPLAY Wireless Controller, Victrix Pro BFG Wireless Controller, Victrix Pro BFG Reloaded Wireless Modular Controller, Rematch Wireless RGB Gaming Controller for PC, Stealth Flip Wireless Controller, Amkette EvoFox Elite X2 Pro Tri Mode Wireless Gamepad, EvoFox One S 3 Mode Wireless Gamepad, EvoFox One X Tri-Mode Wireless Gamepad, EvoFox Deck Smartphone Gamepad, EvoFox Deck 2 Smartphone Gamepad, EvoFox Go Smartphone Bluetooth Gamepad, EvoFox One Universal Bluetooth Gamepad, PowerA OPS v1 Wireless Controller for PC and Cloud Gaming, OPS v3 Pro Wireless Controller for PC and Cloud Gaming with Lumectra or SteelSeries Stratus+, Stratus Duo, Nimbus+, Nimbus Cloud, Aeon Pro)	USB, Bluetooth	DirectInput; XInput	Both DirectInput and XInput controller APIs are supported. Controllers in XInput mode are treated as Xbox controllers.; Possible issues might occur, such as a controller not responding to inputs. This usually can be resolved by: toggling the switch on the controller to DirectInput & re-plugging the USB cable to refresh the connection, or quitting/re-joining a game session.; USB connections can also be used on Android devices and/or more recent iPhone/iPad models by plugging in a USB OTG (Micro-USB/Lightning/USB-C to USB-A/USB-C) adapter on an Android phone/tablet and/or an iPhone/iPad.; Third-party controllers are supported on Windows, Mac, Chromebook, iOS, Android, but unsupported on Fire TV/Fire Tablet.
Xbox Wireless Controller (for Xbox One and Xbox Series X/S)	USB, Bluetooth	XInput	USB connections can also be used on Android devices and/or more recent iPhone/iPad models by plugging in a USB OTG (Micro-USB/Lightning/USB-C to USB-A/USB-C) adapter on an Android phone/tablet and/or an iPhone/iPad.; When using a PlayStation controller, Xbox-style controls might appear on screen in a game (i.e A button corresponds to Cross button, B button corresponds to Circle button etc.), as Windows Server is used for Amazon Luna's backend server infrastructure.
PlayStation 4 controller (DualShock 4) PlayStation 5 controller (DualSense)	USB, Bluetooth	DirectInput	USB connections can also be used on Android devices and/or more recent iPhone/iPad models by plugging in a USB OTG (Micro-USB/Lightning/USB-C to USB-A/USB-C) adapter on an Android phone/tablet and/or an iPhone/iPad.; When using a PlayStation controller, Xbox-style controls might appear on screen in a game (i.e A button corresponds to Cross button, B button corresponds to Circle button etc.), as Windows Server is used for Amazon Luna's backend server infrastructure.
Nintendo Switch Pro Controller Nintendo Switch 2 Pro Controller	USB, Bluetooth	DirectInput	USB connections can also be used on Android devices and/or more recent iPhone/iPad models by plugging in a USB OTG (Micro-USB/Lightning/USB-C to USB-A/USB-C) adapter on an Android phone/tablet and/or an iPhone/iPad.; When using a PlayStation controller, Xbox-style controls might appear on screen in a game (i.e A button corresponds to Cross button, B button corresponds to Circle button etc.), as Windows Server is used for Amazon Luna's backend server infrastructure.
Google Stadia Controller	USB, Bluetooth	DirectInput	USB connections can also be used on Android devices and/or more recent iPhone/iPad models by plugging in a USB OTG (Micro-USB/Lightning/USB-C to USB-A/USB-C) adapter on an Android phone/tablet and/or an iPhone/iPad.; When using a PlayStation controller, Xbox-style controls might appear on screen in a game (i.e A button corresponds to Cross button, B button corresponds to Circle button etc.), as Windows Server is used for Amazon Luna's backend server infrastructure.
Luna Controller	USB, Bluetooth, Wi-Fi (Cloud Direct)	DirectInput (default); XInput (with optional driver installation)	The Cloud Direct option connects a Luna Controller directly to Amazon's custom game servers, reducing latency.; The Luna controller operates in DirectInput mode by default. XInput mode can be activated by installing the hardware drivers.; Using Bluetooth with a Luna controller on Windows requires installation of hardware drivers.; USB connections can also be used on Android devices and/or more recent iPhone/iPad models with a USB-C to USB-C cable.
Phone touchscreen as virtual controller	Wi-Fi (Cloud Direct)	—N/a	The Luna Controller mobile app allows a phone's touchscreen to be used as a virtual controller for operating Luna on another computer or smart TV.

== Reception ==
In a review of Amazon Luna in March 2021, a CNN article praised the service for its lower price compared to Stadia and Xbox Game Pass Ultimate and praised its user interface, while criticizing occasional lag issues and its initial game lineup. A review from Screen Rant criticized the channel setup, arguing that those who want the full experience will end up paying more than for similar services. The review remarked that the service feels misguided, with an unclear target audience, and considered it too impractical to recommend to consumers. However, it also stated that it may be a good replacement to a console for people who prefer using subscription services.

== Availability ==
Availability of Amazon Luna as of September 11, 2026: With cloud Without cloud

As of September 2026, Luna is available to subscribers in twenty-four countries worldwide, which are listed in the table below. Countries are categorized by their access level: full access (Cloud games, Game Night, and claimable games) or partial access (claimable games only). Guests who do not have a subscription are able to join Luna Couch sessions hosted by subscribers to play local co-op games.

Country	Launch date	Access level
United States	March 1, 2022	With cloud
Canada	March 22, 2023	With cloud
Germany	March 22, 2023	With cloud
United Kingdom	March 22, 2023	With cloud
France	November 15, 2023	With cloud
Italy	November 15, 2023	With cloud
Spain	November 15, 2023	With cloud
Austria	June 20, 2024	With cloud
Netherlands	June 20, 2024	With cloud
Poland	June 20, 2024	With cloud
Belgium	March 27, 2025	With cloud
Luxembourg	March 27, 2025	With cloud
Portugal	March 27, 2025	With cloud
Sweden	March 27, 2025	With cloud
Australia	October 1, 2025	Without cloud
Brazil	October 1, 2025	Without cloud
Egypt	October 1, 2025	Without cloud
India	October 1, 2025	Without cloud
Japan	October 1, 2025	Without cloud
Mexico	October 1, 2025	Without cloud
Saudi Arabia	October 1, 2025	Without cloud
Singapore	October 1, 2025	Without cloud
Turkey	October 1, 2025	Without cloud
United Arab Emirates	October 1, 2025	Without cloud
