= Backbone Labs =

American technology company

Backbone Labs, Inc.
- Type: Private
- Industry: Consumer electronics; Software services; Online services
- Founded: 2018
- Founders: Maneet Khaira
- Headquarters: Atherton, California
- Area served: Worldwide
- Products: Backbone One; Backbone Pro
- Website: backbone.com

Backbone Labs, Inc. is an American technology company with offices in Atherton, California and Seattle, Washington. The company is known for consumer electronics and computer software products for gaming on Apple's iOS and Google's Android devices. Backbone operates the Backbone app, a social and content creation hub for mobile devices.

Backbone's software consolidates multiple gaming technologies—cloud gaming, remote play, and native mobile games—into a "single accessible portal" that works across publishers and platforms. Traditionally, the video game industry has limited access to specific games through platform exclusivity, tying them to console hardware, a strategy responsible for the console wars. Backbone leveraged advancements in cloud-based game streaming, smartphone computational power, and cross-platform play to consolidate platforms and allow users to play console-quality games without owning traditional game console hardware. Users can search a library of every available game and launch them directly through the Backbone app. The app offers access to platforms such as Xbox Cloud Gaming, PlayStation Remote Play, Steam Link, Nvidia GeForce Now, Amazon Luna, Boosteroid, Shadow.tech, Apple Arcade, App Store (Apple), and Google Play.

== History ==
Backbone began as a startup by founder and CEO Maneet Khaira in 2018 while working at Google. Khaira wanted to develop a more cohesive way to play games on mobile platforms. The company financed the production of its first product, Backbone One, with investments from MrBeast, PrestonPlayz, Kwebbelkop, Typical Gamer, Night Media, Nadeshot, and Ludlow Ventures, as well as Ashton Kutcher and Guy Oseary’s Sound Ventures. Backbone launched the Backbone One controller on October 27, 2020, and made it immediately available for purchase via limited drops.

In September 2021, Apple announced the iPhone 13 Pro and Pro Max models featuring larger camera units. While the Backbone One was still compatible with the new models, some users voiced a desire for a more comfortable fitment. Backbone introduced an optional adapter for their device and released a free open-source 3D printable file for users to print at home within days of the iPhone release.

In November 2021, Backbone launched the Backbone+ service. The service gives users access to premium software features of the Backbone app, including the ability to stream to Twitch, enhanced recording options, and Xbox app integrations. The service offers users in-app perks such as free trials to Xbox Game Pass Ultimate and Google Stadia.

On February 23, 2022, Backbone announced it had raised $40 million in its Series A funding round led by Index Ventures. Other notable investors in the round included Jason Citron (Discord), Nick Fajt (Rec Room), Patrick Spence (Sonos), The Weeknd, Kevin Hart, Amy Schumer, Sound Ventures, and Nico Wittenborn's Adjacent.

In July 2022, Backbone collaborated with Sony's design team to develop a PlayStation-branded Backbone One controller. The device resembled the DualSense controller in appearance. The Backbone One—PlayStation Edition is compatible with PS Remote Play on iOS and Android devices. The Sony partnership means Backbone has active partnerships with two major companies in the gaming console space, including Microsoft, which began in 2021.

In 2023, the Backbone One 2nd Generation introduced refinements to the original design. This iteration features a refined directional pad, improved phone stability, and magnetic adapters, enabling greater compatibility with most phone cases and larger phones. The device debuted with support for both iOS and Android devices with USB-C connectors. Backbone's retail expansion efforts made the product available from Backbone, Best Buy, Amazon, Target, GameStop, and Verizon.

In September 2024, Backbone announced that its Backbone One 2nd Generation controller is compatible with the iPhone 16. Apple featured the controller alongside the iPhone 16 in its annual keynote showcase.

In May 2025, Backbone launched the Backbone Pro controller. The Pro controller was designed for better ergonomics than the previous Backbone One controllers. It also introduced new features such as wireless connectivity, back buttons, and improved input mechanisms.

== Partnerships ==
In March 2021, Backbone partnered with Nvidia to integrate their cloud gaming service GeForce Now with the Backbone platform and listed Backbone One as a recommended device for the service.

In June 2021, the company partnered with Microsoft to bring Xbox Cloud Gaming to iOS devices. The Backbone One controller was added to the designed for Xbox partner hardware program and is available for purchase from the Microsoft Store. The packaging for the Backbone One was redesigned with Xbox branding.

In October 2021, Backbone partnered with Iconfactory to bring exclusive Backbone-themed in-game cosmetics to the Apple Arcade exclusive second installment of the Frenzic series, Frenzic: Overtime. Players who connect a Backbone One controller to play the game will receive an alternate version of DoBot featuring Backbone branding.

In November 2021, Backbone and Twitch announced a partnership to integrate Twitch features within the Backbone+ service. IGDB, Twitch's game database, is used with the Backbone platform to display richer content within the app. The announcement also revealed that players would have immediate access to Twitch streaming and viewing directly from the Backbone app.

In January 2024, Backbone partnered with Kojima Productions to launch a limited edition Backbone One Death Stranding Edition. The device was themed after the studio's premiere video game series, Death Stranding with translucent yellow plastic. The limited edition controller was bundled with a free iOS copy of Death Stranding: Director's Cut.

In June 2024, Backbone and Post Malone released a limited-edition Backbone One mobile gaming controller. The device was said to be inspired by Malone's style and gaming passion, the controller has a translucent green design with glow-in-the-dark elements. Limited to 500 units and priced at $199.99, it featured enhancements like an aluminum D-pad and laser-etched buttons.
