= Shadow (service) =

Cloud computing service

Shadow S.A.S.
- Logo used since 2022
- Industry: Cloud computing; Cloud gaming
- Founded: 2015
- Founders: Emmanuel Freund; Stéphane Héliot; Asher Kagan-Criou
- Website: shadow.tech

Shadow.tech is a cloud computing service developed by the French company Blade that was acquired by OVHcloud founder Octave Klaba in 2021. Its technology is based on Windows 10 servers executing video games or other Windows software applications remotely. Unlike many other cloud services such as Boosteroid, Nvidia GeForce Now, Amazon Luna, or the now defunct Google Stadia, Shadow is not limited to running video games, as Shadow.tech provides remote access to a complete PC infrastructure.

== History ==
In 2015, Emmanuel Freund, Stéphane Héliot and Asher Kagan-Criou created a start-up called Blade to propose a cloud-gaming service called Shadow.

At the start of 2016, they raised 3 million euros of capital, then 10 million, followed in 2017 by 51 million, with several investors.

In 2019, Blade further raised 30 million euros, following the arrival of Google in the Cloud gaming sector with Stadia.

In October 2019, Shadow had more than 70000 users. In November 2020, They announced having more than 100000 active users.

In September 2020, Blade CEO and CTO change for Mike Fischer and Jean-Baptiste Kempf (one of the major contributors of the VLC media player project).

In March 2021, it was announced that Blade had filed for Chapter 11 Protection in the United States, as well as filing for bankruptcy in Europe.

In May 2021, it was announced that Blade had been bought after its insolvency by Octave Klaba, CEO of OVHcloud. Before he bought the service however, Octave Klaba announced that he was not interested in Cloud Gaming but intended to develop a European alternative to Office 365.

On May 24, 2021, Shadow's new management announced major restructuring to the previous pricing structure, removing the Ultra and Infinite tier plans, and leaving the $30 USD Boost plan as the company's sole offering (until the upcoming hardware upgrades and new plans announced in May 2022 are rolled out.)

In March 2021, the Shadow team announced a Dual Screen feature. In August 2021, Octave Klaba, OVHcloud CEO, informed that service subscription approval was renewed after a pause which lasted starting from the bankruptcy announcements. In October of that year, Shadow also announced a new logo and brand that would begin usage in 2022.

In May 2022, upgrades and expansions to Shadow's services were announced by the company. Software updates such as upgraded graphic cards were introduced to appeal to more experienced gamers using the service. A new subscription tier was also introduced which offered increased storage capacity and higher performance levels.

== Incidents ==
On the 11th of October, 2023, Shadow notified all of its customers via email about a social engineering attack to which the company had fallen victim. The company claimed that the attack was highly sophisticated and that the attacker was able to extract private information about its customers. However, the company also made it clear that no passwords or banking details were compromised. The attackers were able to access customers' first name, last name, date of birth, address, and credit card expiry date. The company has not yet issued a formal statement regarding the matter.
