= Ameba TV =

Subscription based streaming video

Ameba, Inc.
- Company type: Private
- Website type: Streaming video service
- Available in: English
- Headquarters: Winnipeg, {{{location_country}}}
- Area served: Canada & USA
- Website: www.amebatv.com

Ameba is a Canadian subscription streaming video service founded in 2007 and headquartered in Winnipeg, Manitoba, Canada. The service features children's cartoons & television series, movies, and music videos.

On March 21, 2019, Ameba became the first CAVCO-accredited (Canadian Audio-Visual Certification Office), independent, children's streaming service allowing content producers to meet the "Shown in Canada" requirement for the Canadian Film or Video Production Tax Credit (CPTC) program.

== Programming ==
Ameba content comprises over 14,000 episodes and 2,800 hours of children's programming from small independent providers, YouTube creators, and international producers. The service's programming spans educational content, preschool-targeted shows, classic shows from the 1980s-2000s, movies, animations, and music.

== Availability ==
Ameba is currently available in Canada and the United States. Users without an account can only "watch one free, ad-supported video per show", while registered users can watch up to five. Accounts with a premium subscription can view the service's full catalogue, including feature-length movies, and without advertisements.

Ameba TV is available across multiple digital viewing platforms, including:

- Amazon Prime Video Channels
- Amazon Fire TV
- TiVo (standalone and Cable boxes)
- Xbox 360,
- Roku media streamer,
- The Roku Channel,
- Google TV,
- LGE Smart TV, LGE 3D Blu-ray players, and LGE Smart TV Upgraders.
- iOS devices, including iPad, iPod touch, and iPhone.
- Android Tablets and Phones.
- Chromecast
- Cinemood
- Xumo
