= Backbone One =

Mobile gaming controller

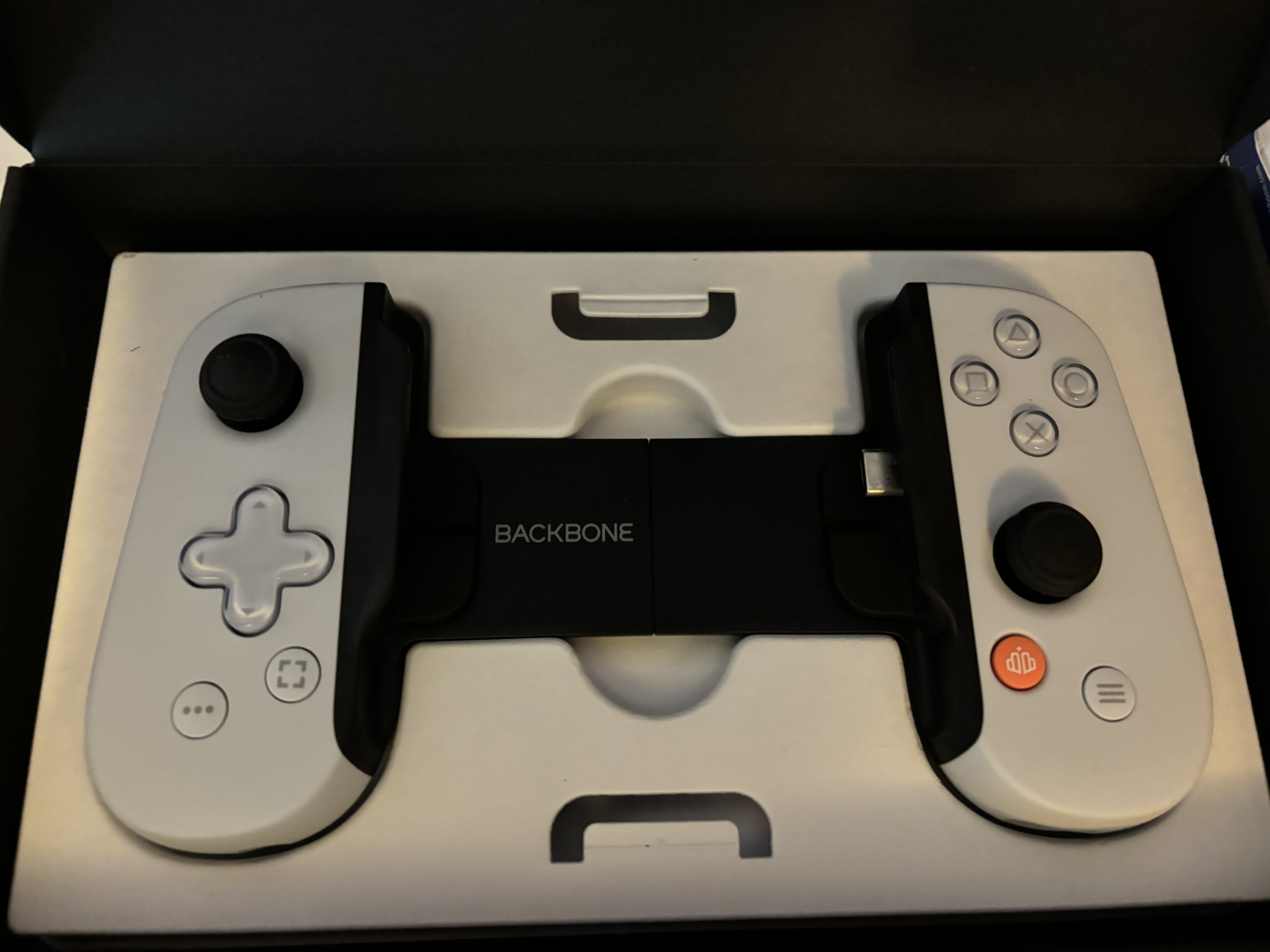
Backbone One (2nd Generation). Shown here is the PlayStation version, which is recommended for playing Sony's PlayStation Plus cloud gaming.

The Backbone One is an attachable game controller for iOS and Android devices produced by Backbone Labs. The iOS version was released on October 27, 2020. The Android version was released on November 16, 2022.

== Description ==
The Backbone One controller was designed in collaboration with Astro Studios. The controller is operated by inserting a compatible device between the two handles of the device and connecting to the Lightning connector (for iPhone models featuring that connector) or the USB-C port (for Android devices and later iPhone models). The Lightning connector version is supported by models from the iPhone 6S on and running iOS 13 or later. The Backbone One controller is rated as an Apple-certified MFi controller. Applications from the App Store that support the MFi standard as a control scheme will allow for use with the device. The USB-C model is compatible with iPhone models from the iPhone 15 on, and devices running Android 10 or later, however it is not considered compatible with folding phones.

The controllers feature a 3.5mm audio jack, which supports headsets with microphones, and a port for pass-through charging. Software functions like screen capture, launching the Backbone app, and muting the microphone are mapped to physical buttons on the device.

In 2023, the Backbone One 2nd Generation was released. It introduced refinements to the original design, including a refined directional pad, improved phone stability, and magnetic adapters, enabling greater compatibility with most phone cases and larger phones. The device debuted with support for both iOS and Android devices with USB-C connectors.

=== Backbone app ===
Alongside the controller, Backbone Labs released the Backbone app, which acts as a social hub and allows for editing and sharing recorded gameplay through social media platforms. It features a "friends" list and allows players to add other Backbone players and view their online and in-game statuses. The app utilizes rich presence notifications to inform players when a friend plugs in a Backbone One or has invited them to a party chat. Up to 8 friends can join Backbone parties, which function as private voice chat rooms. The app features the ability to record gameplay up to 1080p at 30fps with a 20 Mbit/s bitrate. Recordings are saved directly to the Backbone app with the option to later edit and share over social media and iMessage from within the app.

== Development ==
The Backbone One was developed by Backbone Labs, a company founded by CEO Maneet Khaira in mid-2018 while he was a student at Columbia University in New York. Khaira started the company to develop a more cohesive way to play games on mobile platforms.

=== Partnerships ===
In March 2021, Backbone partnered with Nvidia to certify Backbone One as a recommended controller for their cloud gaming service GeForce Now.

In June 2021, the company partnered with Microsoft to bring Xbox Cloud Gaming to iOS devices. The Backbone One controller was added to the "Designed for Xbox" partner hardware program and was made available for purchase through the Microsoft Store. The Backbone One was also bundled with a 3-month trial of Xbox Game Pass. Backbone updated the Backbone app to feature several Xbox integrations and official "Made for Xbox" branding was added to the packaging.

In June 2022, Backbone partnered with Google to certify Backbone One as a recommended controller for their former cloud gaming service Stadia.

On July 28, 2022, Backbone Labs and Sony announced a PlayStation Edition of the Backbone One designed for use with PlayStation Remote Play. It features a distinct design mimicking the look of a PlayStation 5 controller, including the trademarked,,, and face buttons.
