= GameSir =

Chinese electronics company

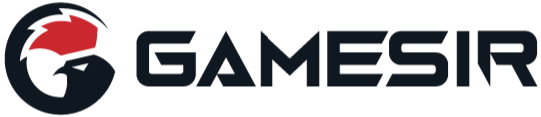
- Industry: Game controllers and software
- Founded: 2013; 13 years ago
- Founder: Yao Ma
- Headquarters: Guangzhou, China
- Website: gamesir.com

GameSir (Note: Chinese: 盖世小鸡. Legal name: Guangzhou Xiaoji Kuaipao Network Technology Co., Ltd. (Chinese: 广州小鸡快跑网络科技有限公司).) is a Chinese company of game controllers and software. It was founded in 2013 by Yao Ma. They are known for creating game controllers for personal computers and smartphones with a cost-benefit approach. Some sources list their controllers among the best. GameSir also created GameHub, an application that emulates PC games on mobile phones.

GameSir has partnered with games such as Zenless Zone Zero and NBA 2K Online 2 to create themed controllers.
