= AirConsole =

Video game console

- Developer: N-Dream
- Type: Cloud OTA Delivery Technology
- Launch date: September 4, 2015
- Website: www.airconsole.com

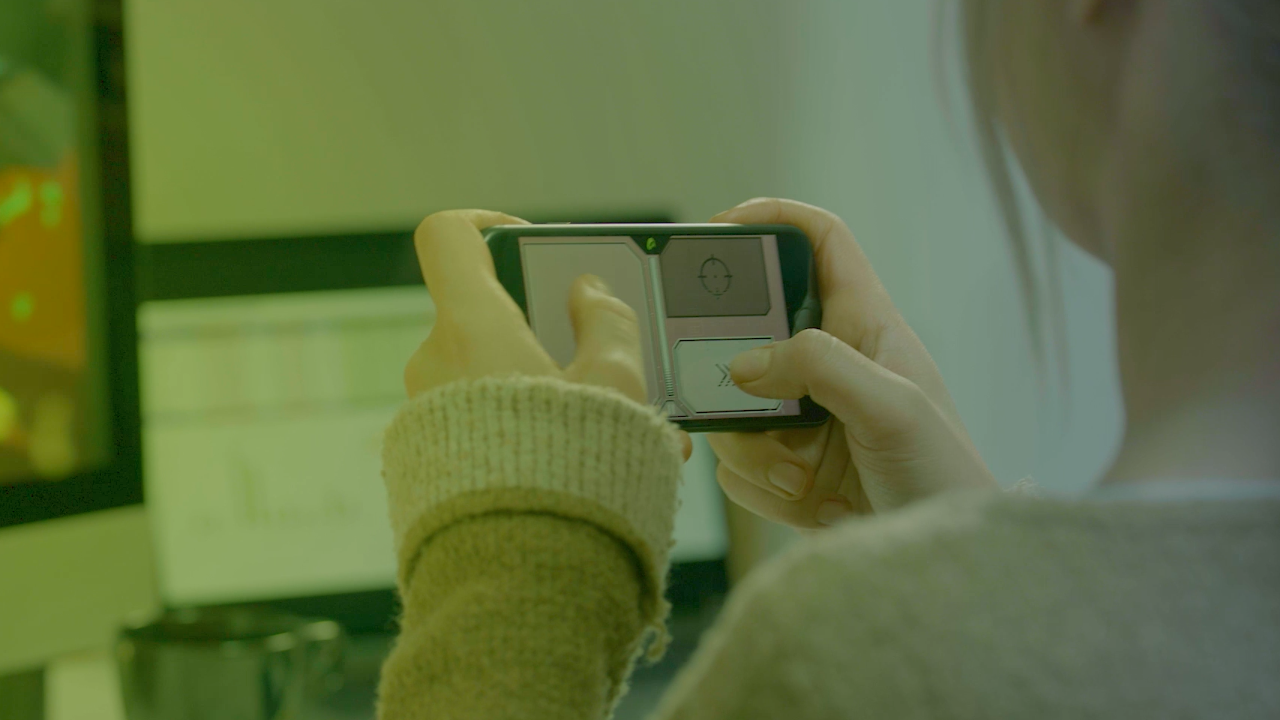
Smartphone as controller on AirConsole

AirConsole is a gaming platform developed by Zurich-based startup N-Dream. It created the concept in January 2015, with around $1.4 million in initial capital. Soon after, N-Dream conducted a game development competition, where developers were encouraged to create their own game on the AirConsole platform.

In 2016, the gaming company was the winner of the 2016 Deutscher Entwicklerpreis). Their game, Castle Hustle was nominated for the Best Student Game Award at the Ludicious Game Festival in 2017.

As of March 2023, AirConsole has many casual games exclusive to its platform across all genres: racing, action, adventure, strategy, sports, quiz, drawing games and more. All games have their own smartphone optimised controls. Next to the AirConsole exclusive titles, there is a selection of games available from Nintendo Switch, Xbox and Steam. Some of their best ranking games include Let's Cook Together, GoKartGo!Air!, Mega Monster Party, fARTworks, Ludo and The Neighbourhood.

In 2022 it was announced that BMW would use AirConsole for in-car entertainment.

== Alternatives ==
There are multiple alternatives on the market to AirConsole:

- PadlessBox — Party games using phones as controllers
