= Boosteroid =

Cloud gaming service

- Developer: Boosteroid
- Key people: Ivan Shvaichenko (Founder & CEO)
- Type: Technology and infrastructure company
- Launched: 2016
- Platforms: Windows PCs; macOS; Linux; Android; Smart TVs
- Website: boosteroid.com

Boosteroid is a technology and infrastructure company that operates large-scale distributed GPU platforms for AI and high-performance computing (HPC). Its infrastructure work includes participation in European data center projects for artificial intelligence, machine learning, high-performance computing, edge computing, and cloud services.

Based in Texas, USA, the company manages 29 data center locations worldwide.

== History ==
Boosteroid was founded by Ivan Shvaichenko in 2016. In 2019, the company officially launched its cloud gaming service, initially focusing on the European market. The service formed an early commercial use of Boosteroid’s GPU server infrastructure.

In 2019, the company partnered with ASUS for their GPU servers, acquiring hardware for their cloud gaming infrastructure.

Boosteroid began its expansion into the United States market in 2021.

In March 2023, Boosteroid secured a 10-year partnership with Microsoft, bringing Xbox PC games to its platform, including popular blockbuster series like Call of Duty, Halo, Forza, Gears of War, in the course of Microsoft's acquisition of Activision Blizzard.

In April 2023, LG Electronics announced the addition of Boosteroid to their TVs in over 60 countries.

In November 2023, Boosteroid partnered with Samsung to integrate its cloud gaming service into Samsung Gaming Hub on Samsung Smart TVs.

The service is pre-installed on devices from Skyworth, the world's largest manufacturer of set-top boxes, following a partnership established in 2023.

As of 2023, Boosteroid had reached $60 million in revenue.

In August 2024, Boosteroid entered a capital partnership with WhiteFiber to secure funds for server infrastructure acquisition.

Following this, in November 2024, Boosteroid signed a Master Service Agreement (MSA) with Bit Digital to deploy up to 50,000 servers, beginning with an initial rollout of GPU clusters in the United States.

As of 2024, Boosteroid had reached $87 million in revenue.

In August 2024, Boosteroid partnered with Mercedes-Benz to integrate its cloud gaming service into the MBUX entertainment system of Mercedes-Benz vehicles.

As of 2025, Boosteroid had reached $125 million in revenue.

In January 2025, Boosteroid launched in South America with servers in Brazil. By the end of the year, the company had grown its network to 28 data center locations.

In 2025, Boosteroid partnered with Titan OS to integrate its cloud gaming application directly into the operating system of smart TVs from manufacturers such as Philips.

In January 2026, Boosteroid launched on Whale TV, making the service available on TV models from brands like Sharp that utilize the Whale OS interface.

To support its expansion into Latin America, Boosteroid expanded its partnership with Paysafe in November 2025. This integration enabled the processing of local payment methods essential for the Brazilian market, including Pix and Boleto Bancario.

As of January 2026, Boosteroid reported a user base of 8 million active subscribers. The service operates on a subscription-based model, offering tiered access to its library and cloud computing features.

== Technology ==
Boosteroid offers native applications for Windows, macOS, Linux, Android, Smart TVs, and in-car infotainment systems. The service is also fully playable directly through a web browser, making it accessible on the majority of internet-connected devices.

Boosteroid operates a distributed network of servers located in data centers across Europe, North America, and South America to deliver its cloud gaming service with low latency and stable performance for users in supported regions.

Boosteroid maintains technological cooperation with AMD to improve hardware infrastructure and use technologies based on Advanced Media Framework in the cloud gaming service.

Clients are available via web browsers and dedicated applications on desktop and mobile, including Windows, macOS, and Android, as well as on Android TV/Google TV and select smart TVs. On supported TVs, the Boosteroid app allows users to play PC games directly without a console. Input is supported via keyboards and mice on desktop, and via compatible Bluetooth or USB gamepads on mobile and TV devices; TVs generally require a supported controller for gameplay.

Boosteroid employs adaptive bitrate streaming that adjusts quality based on available bandwidth and network conditions.

In May 2025, Boosteroid announced the rollout of support for the cutting-edge AOMedia Video 1 (AV1) codec,

The company publishes network guidelines for stable broadband connectivity and latency targets, and the service can scale maximum frame rate.

Content access is based on users’ existing PC game libraries. Boosteroid connects to accounts from major digital distribution platforms, such as Steam and the Epic Games Store to launch supported titles from the cloud without local downloads or updates.

== Infrastructure ==
In North America, Boosteroid uses TierPoint sites for high-density GPU clusters. In Latin America, the service relies on Latitude.sh.

Central and Eastern Europe deployments include Polcom in Poland and Ceske Radiokomunikace (CRA) in the Czech Republic, where Prague hosts servers built on AMD hardware.

In Western Europe, Boosteroid maintains a long-running setup with WIIT in Germany and added a Digital Realty deployment in Spain. The network also grew in Southern Europe with a Bulgaria data center launch in November 2025 for the Balkans.

== Library ==
Boosteroid operates on a "bring your own game" (BYOG) model, where subscribers must purchase titles from third-party digital storefronts before playing them on the cloud. As of early 2026, the Boosteroid library supports over 1,700 titles. The library is composed of games that are pre-installed ("ready-to-play").

=== Publisher partnerships ===
In March 2023, Microsoft and Boosteroid announced a 10-year agreement to bring Xbox PC games to the service, expanding the catalog to select first-party titles subject to publisher permissions and regional availability. The partnership integrated titles from Xbox Game Studios and Bethesda Softworks, starting with Gears 5, Deathloop, Grounded, and Pentiment in June 2023. Following Microsoft's acquisition of Activision Blizzard, the agreement expanded to include major franchises such as Call of Duty and Diablo, which became playable on the service via cloud streaming. In March 2024, Boosteroid further deepened this integration by supporting the Microsoft Store and PC Game Pass, allowing subscribers to sync their Xbox libraries directly with the cloud platform.

In November 2024, the company collaborated with Wargaming to launch a specialized cloud subscription for World of Tanks players. This partnership introduced a co-branded "Boosteroid & WoT" subscription plan that bundled cloud access with recurring in-game benefits.

In January 2025, Boosteroid partnered with Atari to bring a curated selection of retro classics to the cloud, making them playable on modern devices, including smart TVs.

== Partnerships ==
In 2023, Boosteroid partnered with Google to launch a progressive web app (PWA) for ChromeOS. This collaboration included technical optimization for the operating system and integration into the "Chromebook Perks" program.

In August 2024, Boosteroid partnered with ASUS to bundle cloud gaming subscriptions with consumer hardware products, distinct from their server hardware collaboration. In December 2025, Boosteroid added native optimization for the ROG Ally handheld series.

== Supported devices ==
Boosteroid is designed to be accessible on a wide range of devices, via a Chromium-based browser or a dedicated client. The platform supports various operating systems and devices, including:

- Windows PCs
- macOS
- Linux
- Android
- Smart TVs
- Chromebooks
- Xbox Wireless Controller
- DualShock 4 Wireless Controller/DualSense Wireless Controller
- Joy-Con/Joy-Con 2
- Nintendo Switch Pro Controller/Nintendo Switch 2 Pro Controller
- Logitech Gamepad F310/F510/F710
- Google Stadia Controller
- Amazon Luna Controller
- Thrustmaster GP XID Pro
- Gamevice/Flex
- Razer Kishi/Kishi Ultra/Kishi v2/Kishi v2 Pro/Kishi v3/Kishi v3 Pro/Kishi v3 Pro XL/Prio/Raiju Mobile Gaming Controller for Android/Junglecat/Wolverine v3 Pro 8K PC/Wolverine v3 Tournament Edition 8K PC/Wolverine v3 Bluetooth
- SteelSeries Stratus XL/Stratus Duo/Stratus+/Aeon Pro
- Backbone One/Pro
- Nacon GC-100XF/GC-200WL/GC-400ES/Revo PC/Revo PC Max
- PowerA OPS v1 Wireless Controller for PC and Cloud Gaming/OPS v3 Pro Wireless Controller for PC and Cloud Gaming with Lumectra
- Turtle Beach Recon Controller/Recon Cloud Controller/Atom Controller/REACT-R Controller/Racer Wireless Racing Wheel/PDP REPLAY Wireless Controller/Victrix Pro BFG Wireless Controller/Victrix Pro BFG Reloaded Wireless Modular Controller/Rematch Wireless RGB Gaming Controller for PC/Stealth Flip Wireless Controller
- Mad Catz C.A.T. 7/C.A.T. 9/C.A.T. 17
