= Platform exclusivity =

Video games released only on certain platforms

Platform exclusivity (also known as console exclusivity) refers to the status of a video game being developed for and released only on certain platforms. Most commonly, it refers to only being released on a specific video game console or through a specific vendor's platforms—either permanently, or for a definite period of time.

Exclusivity is a topic used in discussions of the advantages and disadvantages of rival vendors in the video game market, and one which is used for marketing by vendors involved. Industry analysts generally agree that there is a correlation between availability of exclusive titles, and hardware sales.

== Usage in the video game industry ==
A video game's exclusivity to specific hardware may either be permanent, or timed—the latter case allowing a game to be released on different console platforms and/or PCs after a specific timeframe lapses. Permanent exclusives are often developed (first-party title), published or heavily funded by the console manufacturer. In some cases, the exclusivity may only apply to a game's console release, either for games being ported from PC to console (such as PlayerUnknown's Battlegrounds, whose console release was a timed Xbox One exclusive), or games being released on PC along with a single console.

Games may also include features and content that are exclusive to specific consoles, such as features that leverage a specific platform's distinguishing features, or appearances by characters from the platform's first-party franchises (such as Banjo and Kazooie being playable characters on the Xbox 360 version of Sonic & Sega All-Stars Racing, and Fox McCloud from Nintendo's Star Fox series being playable in special content on the Nintendo Switch version of Starlink: Battle for Atlas). Timed exclusivity may also apply to downloadable content for an otherwise multi-platform game, such as Activision's exclusivity agreements with Sony Interactive Entertainment (which cover the Call of Duty franchise).

Exclusives are typically at the forefront of promotional efforts during gaming conferences such as E3, in order to help drive sales of hardware, as a consumer choosing between options may be swayed by the different range of games available on each different console. Analysts have stated that sales figures in the past have indicated that there is a relation between hardware sales, and the release of software specifically for that hardware. They state that there is also data which shows that during holiday periods, when consumer spending is generally higher, hardware with a list of exclusive releases generally outsell those with a smaller selection. Correlations have also been drawn between the sales of software, and the sales of relevant hardware, as in late 2009 the Wii dominated both the hardware and software charts.

A console manufacturer may invest in or acquire other video game developers so that their expertise can be leveraged for first-party titles, such as Microsoft's acquisitions of Lionhead Studios (Fable) and Rare (which, up until then, had been strongly-aligned with, and minority-owned by Nintendo), and Sony's acquisitions of Naughty Dog and Insomniac Games—two studios that had primarily developed titles for PlayStation (with the latter having also developed Sony-published titles such as Ratchet & Clank and Spider-Man).

There have begun to be exceptions to the practice: Microsoft Studios-published exclusive Ori and the Blind Forest was given a Nintendo Switch port in 2019 (although this was part of a larger pattern of collaboration with the company, including cross-platform multiplayer support between the Switch and Xbox versions of Minecraft, and inclusion of the title duo from the Rare-developed Nintendo 64 game Banjo-Kazooie as a downloadable character for Super Smash Bros. Ultimate). Following its purchases of Double Fine, Ninja Theory, and Obsidian Entertainment, Microsoft stated that it would honor the multi-platform release plans for games from several studios that it had recently acquired (including Obsidian Entertainment's The Outer Worlds, whose publishing rights had already been sold to Take-Two Interactive prior to Microsoft's purchase of the studio), but that they would focus on Xbox platform exclusives in the future. In December 2019, Sony announced plans to transition its first-party MLB: The Show franchise to multi-platform releases "as early as 2021".

=== Exclusivity in PC gaming ===
In the PC gaming market, a form of platform exclusivity has emerged involving digital distribution, whereby an online retailer acquires exclusive rights to distribute a game by means of either vertical integration between a publisher and a co-owned distribution platform, or through a financial arrangement between a publisher and a third-party distributor. Microsoft Studios employed this strategy on certain first-party releases by making them exclusive to Microsoft Store (formerly Windows Store), including cross-buy support with Xbox One. This also made the games, such as Quantum Break, exclusive to the Windows 10 operating system, due to the use of Universal Windows Platform (UWP). Games on the UWP architecture also included technical and compatibility limitations that critics and consumers considered unfavorable and contrary to norms (such as locked frame rates and incompatibility with third-party tools). However, Microsoft would later re-release Quantum Break on Steam with support for Windows 7 and newer, and announced in May 2019 that it would begin to offer more of its flagship first-party titles on third-party platforms such as Steam to widen their availability, and in Win32 architecture to remove the limitations of UWP.

Epic Games Store has faced criticism for employing this strategy. One prominent case was that of Metro: Exodus, which was abruptly announced as being an Epic Games Store exclusive only shortly before its release, even after taking pre-orders on Steam. Its owner Valve criticized the move as being unfair to consumers, but stated that it would still fulfill and support the game for those who had purchased it prior to the exclusivity deal. Justification for these complaints have included allegations that the store client is spyware, sinophobia (due to minority shares in the company being owned by Chinese conglomerate Tencent, allegedly subjecting it to Chinese government influence and possible espionage), lacking features in comparison to the market-leading Steam (such as per-game communities and cloud saves), and subjection of the PC gaming industry to exclusivity deals reminiscent of those seen on consoles.

Epic Games states that its store is more favorable to publishers by taking only a 12% share of revenue in comparison to Steam (30%). It also waives the separate 5% royalty on games that license Epic-owned Unreal Engine. In response to the criticism, Epic Games stated that it would be less aggressive in seeking exclusivity deals if Valve reduced its revenue cut, and that it would try to avoid repeating the "pushback" associated with the Metro controversy.

== Impact of exclusivity on sales ==
In addition to sales data supporting the relation of hardware sales to software titles, CNET stated that "one of the biggest decisions when choosing a video game system has to be the exclusive games". The focus of E3 on exclusive titles at each manufacturer's press event also reflects the marketing power of exclusive titles, in addition to exclusive hardware.

Many media reports include exclusive hardware and software as points of consideration for consumers. They also draw attention to the relevance of such exclusive titles for the developer, as there may be a potential for greater sales volume when releasing on multiple platforms. Console makers such as Microsoft, Sony and Nintendo also use exclusive titles to their advantage in order to create marketing strategies. Microsoft claimed that the Halo series, specifically Halo 3, was a key "payoff" in their strategy when entering the console market with the Xbox and Xbox 360.

The Wii's dominance during the seventh generation of consoles was credited primarily to Nintendo's focus on targeting a wider audience, rather than competing with PlayStation 3 and Xbox 360 on hardware fidelity and the core market. The console distinguished itself on-launch with its innovative Wii Remote motion controller, as well as family-friendly games that were intuitive and accessible to audiences not typically associated with video gaming. These goals were exemplified by Wii Sports—an exclusive title which was bundled with the console, as well as other Wii series games designed with a similar positioning. By July 2007, it was reported that the Wii had outsold the PlayStation 3 six-to-one, with analysts citing a lack of "killer" exclusives for the platform as affecting market share.

In Japan, Microsoft attempted to use the first-party exclusive Blue Dragon—from Final Fantasy creator Hironobu Sakaguchi—to bolster the local release of the Xbox 360. Several other third-party titles by Japanese publishers, including Dead or Alive 4, The Idolmaster, The Last Remnant, Vampire Rain, and Tales of Vesperia, also chose to initially target the 360 exclusively. A developer of Vampire Rain stated that Microsoft was providing stronger support for developers on Xbox 360 than Sony was for PS3, but when the 360's lack of long-term success in the market became more apparent, they began making ports of the games for PS3 with additional exclusive content to recuperate development costs.

By contrast, the Wii's eighth generation successor, the Wii U, was hampered by a weak lineup of launch titles, an unclear vision for its Wii U GamePad peripheral, and a resulting lack of third-party support. Nintendo relied primarily on exclusives from its first-party franchises—such as Mario Kart 8, Super Smash Bros. for Wii U, and the new IP Splatoon—in order to grow the fledgling console's market share. The Wii U never reached the same market share as its competitors, PlayStation 4 and Xbox One, and manufacturing was discontinued in 2017. Some writers did note that in terms of critical reception, the Wii U did have a stronger library of exclusive titles than its competitors at the time. As of March 2016, the Wii U had more exclusive titles with aggregate scores on Metacritic within the "Good" (75-89) and "Amazing" (89-100) ranking tiers than PS4 and Xbox One combined, and the most within the "Amazing" category (Bayonetta 2, Super Mario 3D World, and Super Smash Bros.; the PS4 only had one "Amazing"-ranked game at the time, Bloodborne, and Xbox One had none).

The eighth generation of consoles was dominated primarily by the PlayStation 4 and Nintendo Switch. Microsoft's Xbox One console faced criticism for not having as many "compelling" exclusives, with critics citing Microsoft's weaker array of first-party studios as a factor. Microsoft has also increasingly preferred dual releases on Microsoft Windows and Xbox One over full Xbox console exclusivity, and deals for console ports of existing PC games to be timed exclusives to Xbox One. In addition, the company has focused on other distinguishing features of its ecosystem, including an emphasis on backward compatibility and its Xbox Game Pass subscription service. In the late-2019s and early-2020s, Microsoft made multiple major studio acquisitions to bolster its first-party development, including most prominently ZeniMax Media—parent company of Bethesda Softworks and Id Software. Microsoft stated that it would honor the multi-platform releases and exclusivity contracts for games already in development (such as Bethesda-published Ghostwire: Tokyo and Deathloop, which were console exclusives for PlayStation 5), but that future games would be "first and better" on Xbox.

After Microsoft's January 2022 announcement of its intent to acquire Activision Blizzard, Microsoft Gaming CEO Phil Spencer, by contrast, stated that it would continue to "support" communities for its games on other platforms. Sony warned that it "expect[s]" Microsoft to "abide by contractual agreements and continue to ensure Activision games are multiplatform." In August 2022, as part of a Brazilian antitrust filing tied to the purchase, Microsoft accused Sony of allegedly paying publishers to not place their games on subscription services. In response to these concerns, Microsoft signed 10-year commitments with both Sony and Nintendo to continue developing Call of Duty titles for their platforms. To quell antitrust concerns that the Activision Blizzard purchase would unduly bolster the Xbox Cloud Gaming service, Microsoft reached long-term agreements to license Activision Blizzard titles to competing cloud gaming services such as GeForce Now and Ubisoft+.
