= EA Play =

Subscription-based gaming service

- Developer: Electronic Arts
- Type: Subscription gaming service
- Launched: August 11, 2014 (Xbox One); July 24, 2019 (PlayStation 4); August 31, 2020 (Steam)
- Platforms: Xbox One; PlayStation 4 Microsoft Windows; PlayStation 5 Xbox Series X/S
- Status: Active
- Website: www.ea.com/ea-play

EA Play (formerly EA Access and Origin Access) is a subscription-based video game service from Electronic Arts for the Xbox One, Xbox Series X/S, PlayStation 4, PlayStation 5 and Microsoft Windows platforms, offering access to selected games published by Electronic Arts along with additional incentives.

As launched, EA Play was pitched to both Microsoft for the Xbox One and Sony for the PlayStation 4, although Sony initially declined to participate as they did not believe it provided value to their customers. EA Play launched first to Xbox One on August 11, 2014, it later arrived to PlayStation 4 on July 24, 2019 and then to Steam on August 31, 2020. EA Play is also bundled with Xbox Game Pass Ultimate and PC for no additional cost.

== Overview ==
EA Play membership can be purchased in one-month or twelve-month increments. Members have unlimited access to the full versions of a selection of games published by EA, dubbed "the Vault", for as long as their membership is active. If membership is suspended, the games can no longer be played, but all progress and game saves are retained. Members may also purchase games available from EA Play outright, along with other EA games and DLC, at a discounted price. EA Play does not require users to have a paid Xbox Live membership, although a Gold-level membership is required for use of any multiplayer features that are included in Access-enabled games.

Games are added to The Play List (previously known as The Vault) at EA's discretion, such as making a title available on Access a set number of days after its retail launch. Although the Terms of Service allow EA to remove titles with 30 days' notice, EA initially pledged that games will not be removed at a later date. However, EA announced on July 20, 2017, that FIFA 14 would be removed on October 18, 2017, due to the decision to end online support for the title. The game will remain playable in offline mode for users who installed it prior to its removal date, but if the game is removed from the console after that date, it cannot be reinstalled. EA described the removal of FIFA 14 as a "unique circumstance specific to the title" that was not representative of their future plans for EA Play. On April 26, 2018, it was initially announced that Rory McIlroy PGA Tour would also be removed on May 22, 2018, due to the game being delisted from the Xbox Store on that date, although, as of May 2021, the game remains available and playable on the service. In 2020–2021 many third-party games were removed, and in April 2021 EA began removing older EA Sports games from the service.

Subscribers can play selected titles for a limited time of eight hours, this does not apply to the "Pro" subscription tier. EA described these early-release versions as not being more traditional demos, but instead full-featured but time-limited versions, with the exact extent of content varying from game to game. Any progress earned within these limited versions will carry over to the full retail version.

Games published on the EA Partners and/or EA Originals labels were initially not eligible for EA Play benefits. However, Titanfall was added to the Vault in June 2015, as part of an E3 2015 promotion that also enabled a free trial for all Xbox One owners. Titanfall 2 was also added in July 2017. However, EA Originals titles, such as A Way Out, Rocket Arena and Sea of Solitude, were added into the service. Additionally, it was announced that the forthcoming EA Originals title Knockout City would be available on the service (regardless of subscription tier) on its May 21, 2021, release date.

EA Play subscribers are able to receive downloadable content for games in the Vault free at during various limited time periods, such as the Naval Strike and Second Assault DLCs for Battlefield 4. Subscribers who download the free DLCs offered during the free period are able to keep them regardless of subscription status. On May 3, 2016, Premium access for Battlefield 4 and Battlefield Hardline were offered free for a limited period of time, enabling subscribers to download all released expansions for both games at no cost. Although Battlefield 4 Premium content can only be accessed with an active subscription, subscribers were allowed to keep Hardline Premium features regardless of subscription status. The season pass for Star Wars Battlefront was made available at no cost for subscribers on July 7, 2017.

== History ==
On February 29, 2016, EA Play expanded to include Xbox 360 titles via the Xbox One's backward compatibility feature, starting with the original Plants vs. Zombies. Dead Space was added (without any official announcement) on March 31. On January 17, 2018, Black, released for Xbox in 2006, was added to the Vault.

EA announced that alongside bringing its catalog back to Steam in October 2019, that it would also release a version of EA Play for Steam users with a library comparable to the Xbox and PlayStation versions. The first set of these games were added to Steam in June 2020.

Ahead of the launch of EA Play to Steam on August 31, 2020, EA announced the re-branding of EA Play and Origin Access to EA Play starting August 18, 2020, across both computer and console. The previous basic EA Play and Origin Access Basic subscription tiers would be treated as EA Play, while the Origin Access Premier would become EA Play Pro. No other changes to the service or prices were planned otherwise. EA Play on Steam and EA Play on Origin are separate subscriptions, with the latter having a significantly larger library of games despite being the same price.

EA partnered with Microsoft so that Xbox Game Pass subscribers would have access to the basic EA Play service at no additional cost. It is included in Xbox Game Pass Ultimate and Game Pass for PC. Xbox users got access to the feature on November 10, 2020, to coincide with the launch of the Xbox Series X/S, whereas the Windows launch was postponed from its original date of December 15, 2020, to March 18, 2021.

EA has announced plans to retire the Origin client for personal computers in favor of the new EA app to support EA Play and EA Play Pro. The beta for the EA app launched in September 2020. The EA app is required to access EA Play with Xbox Game Pass.

== Release and reception ==
EA Play debuted in beta form exclusively on Xbox One on July 29, 2014, and was officially launched on August 11, 2014. Electronic Arts approached both Sony and Microsoft with the service, but Sony declined to make it available on their PlayStation 4 console. A similar version called Origin Access launched on January 12, 2016, on PC.

Shares of video game retailer GameStop, which sells both new and used games, fell over five percent after Electronic Arts' announcement. A similar price drop occurred after PlayStation Now was first announced and that the stock price subsequently recovered. GameStop will be one of the retailers selling EA Play memberships.

== Logo history ==
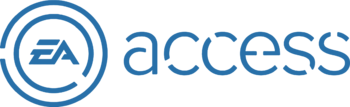
2014–2016

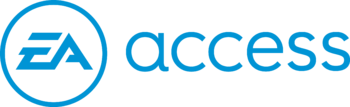
2016–2020

2020–present

== See also ==
- Xbox Game Pass
- PlayStation Now
- GameClub
- Ubisoft+
- Nintendo Switch Online
