= Sitch =

Sitch may refer to:

== People ==
- Rob Sitch, an Australian filmmaker and actor
- Greg Sitch, lawyer and film producer, brother of Rob Sitch

== Fictional characters ==
- Sitch, a character from the manga One-Punch Man

== See also ==
- Kim Possible: A Sitch in Time, a 2003 American animated TV film
- Stitch (disambiguation)
