= Stich =

Stich is a surname. Notable people with the surname include:

- Giovanni Punto, born Jan Václav Stich (1746–1803), Czech horn player and composer
- David Štich (born 1989), Czech athlete
- Michael Stich (born 1968), German professional tennis player
- Otto Stich (1927–2012), Swiss politician
- Randolf Stich (1966–2023), German politician
- Stephen Stich (born 1943), professor of philosophy at Rutgers University

== See also ==
- Stitch (disambiguation)
