= Wipr =

Ad blocker for Safari

Wipr 2
- Developer: Kaylee Serena Calderolla
- Release: 2015; 11 years ago (Legacy), 2024; 2 years ago (Wipr 2)
- Stable release: 2.30 / 22 May 2026
- Operating system: iOS, iPadOS, macOS, visionOS
- Type: Ad blocker
- License: Proprietary
- Website: kaylees.site

Wipr is a paid ad blocker for Safari on iOS, iPadOS, macOS, and visionOS. The app blocks advertisements, trackers, cookie banners, pop-ups, and other unwanted content. Wipr is developed by independent developer Kaylee Serena Calderolla, who has been building indie apps for iOS and Mac since 2010. Calderolla is originally from Veneto, Italy, and worked at a startup in San Francisco from 2012 to 2014 before becoming a full-time indie developer.

The app uses Safari's content-blocking API, requires no access to browsing data, and updates its block lists automatically twice a week. It is available as a one-time purchase and supports Family Sharing. According to the developer, Wipr does not collect any user data and does not allow ads classified as "acceptable advertising".

== History ==
The original version of Wipr (now referred to as Wipr Legacy) was released in 2015 for Safari on iOS and macOS.

On November 12, 2024, Calderolla released Wipr 2 as its successor. According to the developer, Wipr 2 was almost entirely rewritten. The app uses SwiftUI, the current content-blocking extension API, and is built as a Mac Catalyst app.

== Features ==
Wipr blocks advertisements, pop-ups, trackers, cookie banners, cryptocurrency miners, notification prompts, and other elements deemed intrusive. The block list is updated automatically twice a week and offers extended versions for over 30 languages.

=== Wipr Extra ===
The optional Wipr Extra component enables enhanced blocking of persistent content through additional technologies. This requires full access to websites, meaning Safari cannot fully guarantee privacy. However, the injected script can be independently reviewed using Safari's Web Inspector.

Since version 2.7, Wipr Extra can also restore Picture-in-picture playback on video sites that deliberately disable this feature.

=== Filtr ===
Filtr is an extension that expands Wipr's blocking to all apps on a device. It is based on a system feature called URL Filtering introduced with iOS/iPadOS/macOS 26 and requires those operating system versions. Unlike a VPN, Filtr does not gain access to the device's network traffic but instead instructs the system which requests to block. Filtr can be used simultaneously with VPNs, iCloud Private Relay, and custom DNS.

Filtr is available as an in-app purchase covering all of a user's devices, with Family Sharing support. According to the developer, Wipr is the first app to use this Apple technology. Filtr was released on May 22, 2026, with Wipr 2 version 2.30.

== Reception ==
The app was highlighted at WWDC 2023 in the session "What's New in Safari Extensions". Wipr has reached the top of the App Store charts on multiple occasions. In Germany, Wipr Legacy briefly held the number one position among paid apps. After the launch of Wipr 2, the app reached the top spot among paid Mac apps in the App Store. In Apple's published list of the best-selling paid iPhone apps in the United States in 2025, Wipr 2 ranked 14th.

Macworld described Wipr 2 as one of the recommended Safari extensions, noting its actively maintained block lists.

Compared to other apps, the lack of support for custom block lists has been noted as a shortcoming.

In testing by Lifehacker, Filtr blocked ads in third-party browsers such as Chrome and Firefox, as well as in news, sports, and game apps. However, Filtr cannot block ads that an app serves through its own networks, such as those on YouTube, Reddit, Facebook, Instagram, and LinkedIn; a workaround is to use the service's mobile website in Safari, where Wipr removes the ads.

== See also ==
- Ad blocking
- Content-control software
- Safari (web browser)
