= Apple Arcade =

Video game subscription service by Apple

- Developer: Apple
- Type: Video game subscription service
- Launched: September 19, 2019; 7 years ago
- Platforms: iPhone, iPad, iPod Touch, Mac, Apple TV, Apple Vision Pro
- Operating systems: iOS 13 or later, iPadOS 13 or later, macOS Catalina or later, tvOS 13 or later, and VisionOS
- Status: Active
- Pricing model: US$6.99 per month or US$49.99 annually
- Website: apple.com/apple-arcade

Apple Arcade is a video game subscription service offered by Apple. It is available through a dedicated tab of the App Store on devices running iOS 13, VisionOS, tvOS 13, iPadOS 13, and macOS Catalina or later. The service launched on September 19, 2019.

It offers video games that exclude practices such as in-app purchases and advertisements. Most games on the service are indie games or previously existing mobile games.

== Features ==
All games available on the service are free of advertisements, in-app purchases, data tracking processes, and can be played without an internet connection. Subscribers can share access with up to five others through family sharing and the service can also be purchased through the Apple One bundle. Both standalone subscriptions and the Apple One bundle provide a free one-month trial and can be cancelled at any time.

Games on the service feature integration with Game Center and iCloud, allowing games to implement social features such as achievements and leaderboards, and to carry data between devices when linked to the same iCloud account. In addition to Apple's own products, many games are compatible with third-party controllers such as the DualShock 4, DualSense and Xbox Wireless Controller, with support for Joy-Con and the Nintendo Switch Pro Controller added with the release of iOS 16. By extension, controllers modeled after gamepads from retro Nintendo and Sega consoles for use with the Nintendo Classics service are also supported with iOS 16. On Apple TV, some Apple Arcade games require controllers outright.

Although some games on the service have watchOS support in game versions that are not on Apple Arcade, for instance Lifeline, no game versions that are included in Apple Arcade have watchOS support.

== History ==
Apple Arcade was announced in March 2019 at an Apple Event showcasing their various upcoming services. It launched in September 2019 with 71 games, with Apple stating that the number would grow to over 100 by 2020. The apps support a minimum of 14 languages and can be accessed in over 150 countries. Notable titles included Sneaky Sasquatch, What the Golf?, Sayonara Wild Hearts, Rayman Mini, Exit the Gungeon, and Lego Brawls.

Notable publishers and developers that have partnered with Apple to create Arcade games include Capcom, Sega, Bandai Namco Entertainment, Konami, Devolver Digital and Annapurna Interactive. Developers cannot release their Apple Arcade games on other mobile platforms due to exclusivity agreements, but are allowed to release their games on console or personal computers. Apple does not share game performance metrics with developers, only revealing whether the game has been accepted onto the Apple Arcade platform.

There are several categories within the platform that group together similar games based on their premise, genre, level of difficulty and more. Some categories include "adventure", "puzzle", and "education". There is also a category called "daily play suggestions", which offers a curated selection of games based on the consumer's download and gameplay history.

In June 2020, Bloomberg reported that Apple ended its contract with some future Arcade titles and shifted its strategy to seek games with stronger engagement to retain subscribers. It was further noted that Apple invited former Arcade partners to return and develop titles that would fit Apple's new strategy.

On April 2, 2021, Apple released a number of new games and announced that it would be bringing "Timeless Classics" and "App Store Greats" to the service. These are versions of pre-existing popular games already available on the App Store with in-app purchases and ads removed, denoted by a "+" at the end of the application name. Notable games added to the service include Fruit Ninja Classic+, Monument Valley+, and Threes!+. Unlike titles developed exclusively for Apple Arcade, these games are only available for iOS and iPadOS devices, and are largely intact versions of the original games without microtransactions or in-app purchases for downloadable content.

Years after its launch, the service had been met with significant criticism for its engagement-based payment system to developers, indirectly causing voluntary removal of less popular video games by their developers. This rendered some exclusive titles unavailable, with a perceived shift of focus to a family audience prominent amongst critics. Apple Arcade head Alex Rofman noted that while games with low player counts had to be removed as they could not "grow its player base month over month", they are still "an outlet for indies with creative, innovative ideas", contradicting reports of Apple's apparent ill treatment of independent game studios and cancellation of an unknown number of games that were in development.

== Reception ==
According to CNET, "Every game platform rises or falls on whether it has games that people actually want to play. The breadth of Apple Arcade's catalog, bolstered by consistent new releases and updates, is impressive. There are a ton of different types of games -- mystery games, family games, puzzle games, nostalgic games and more."

In TechRadar, David Lumb wrote, "The hope is that Arcade games distinguish themselves, and the service as a whole, thanks to Apple assistance written into the platform. When developers sign their games up to be on Arcade, the company pledges an undefined level of financial support to give creators breathing room to make the games they want to make."

Referencing Lifewire, artist and programmer Tyrone Evans Clark told Lifewire, "I feel personally more attracted to the Apple Arcade because they have more of a variety pack of games to choose from," "Nintendo's Switch Game Store has a limited number of games, and they are mostly predominantly Nintendo brands such as anything relating to the characters Mario, Zelda, Pokémon, etc. Apple Arcade, on the other hand, has a little bit of everything for everyone."

Jordan Minor of PC Magazine wrote, "That's why, as someone who believes in mobile gaming's potential, Apple Arcade's launch was so exciting. For $5 per month, Apple gives you access to a fast-growing library of nearly 200 premium games to enjoy on iPhone, iPad, Mac, and Apple TV with a real controller connected. None of these games compromise their design with garbage F2P mechanics, and that's so refreshing to see in this space."

== Revenue ==
In 2018, premium games on the App Store generated US$476 million while free-to-play games produced US$21.3 billion in revenue. Also, the number of premium apps available on the App Store fell from 21.6% of total App Store games in 2014 to 9.3% in 2018. Some analysts argue that this is a contributing factor to the development and founding of Apple Arcade, with the economic perspective that consumers will be more incentivized to pay a subscription fee to access a range of premium apps rather than purchasing individual premium games. Others have argued that Apple Arcade is another source of revenue for Apple and enables them to compete with other video-game subscription services like Google Play Pass and Xbox Game Pass.

Apple spent $500 million to launch Apple Arcade. Apple pays app developers an upfront fee to create video-games for the platform and corresponds with some developers in the development process.

While developer payouts were initially lucrative, it was reported that Apple Arcade's upfront payments and per-play bonus pool started to decline around October 2020, and has continued since.

== Original games ==
This list is for video games on the service that are not "plus games", i.e. preexisting video games released on the service. All games are released on iOS, macOS and tvOS unless otherwise noted.

Title	Developer(s)	Publisher(s)	Release date
Agent Intercept	PikPok		September 19, 2019
Assemble with Care	ustwo		September 19, 2019
ATONE: Heart of the Elder Tree	Wildboy Studios		September 19, 2019
Big Time Sports	Frosty Pop		September 19, 2019
Bleak Sword	more8bit	Devolver Digital	September 19, 2019
BattleSky Brigade: Harpooner	BattleBrew Productions		September 19, 2019
Card of Darkness	Choice Provisions	Zach Gage	September 19, 2019
Cardpocalypse	Gambrinous	Versus Evil	September 19, 2019
Cat Quest II	The Gentlebros		September 19, 2019
ChuChu Rocket! Universe	Hardlight	Sega	September 19, 2019
Cricket Through the Ages	Free Lives	Devolver Digital	September 19, 2019
Dear Reader	Local No. 12		September 19, 2019
Dead End Job	Ant Workshop	Headup Games	September 19, 2019
Dodo Peak	Moving Pieces		September 19, 2019
Don't Bug Me!	Frosty Pop		September 19, 2019
Down in Bermuda	Yak & Co.		September 19, 2019
Dread Nautical	Zen Studios		September 19, 2019
EarthNight	Cleaversoft		September 19, 2019
Exit the Gungeon	Dodge Roll	Devolver Digital	September 19, 2019
Explottens	WeRPlay		September 19, 2019
Fledgling Heroes	Subtle Boom		September 19, 2019
Frogger in Toy Town	Q-Games	Konami	September 19, 2019
Grindstone	Capybara Games		September 19, 2019
Hexaflip: The Action Puzzler	David Marquardt	Rogue Games	September 19, 2019
Hot Lava	Klei Entertainment		September 19, 2019
HyperBrawl Tournament	Milky Tea		September 19, 2019
Jenny LeClue - Detectivú	Mografi		September 19, 2019
King's League II	Kurechii		September 19, 2019
Lego Brawls	Red Games Co.	Lego	September 19, 2019
Lifeslide	Dreamteck	Block Zero	September 19, 2019
Mini Motorways	Dinosaur Polo Club		September 19, 2019
Murder Mystery Machine	Blazing Griffin		September 19, 2019
Mutazione	Die Gute Fabrik		September 19, 2019
Neo Cab	Chance Agency	Fellow Traveller Games	September 19, 2019
Oceanhorn 2: Knights of the Lost Realm	Cornfox & Bros.		September 19, 2019
Operator 41	Spruce Campbell	Shifty Eye Games	September 19, 2019
Outlanders	Pomelo Games		September 19, 2019
Overland	Finji		September 19, 2019
Over the Alps	Stave Studios		September 19, 2019
Painty Mob	Flee Punk	Devolver Digital	September 19, 2019
Patterned	BorderLeap		September 19, 2019
Possessions.	Lucid Labs	Noodlecake Studios	September 19, 2019
Projection: First Light	Shadowplay Studios	Blowfish Studios	September 19, 2019
Punch Planet	Sector-K Games	Block Zero	September 19, 2019
Rayman Mini	Pastagames	Ubisoft	September 19, 2019
Red Reign	Ninja Kiwi		September 19, 2019
Sayonara Wild Hearts	Simogo	Annapurna Interactive	September 19, 2019
Shantae and the Seven Sirens	WayForward		September 19, 2019
Shinsekai: Into the Depths	Capcom		September 19, 2019
Skate City	Agens	Snowman	September 19, 2019
Sneaky Sasquatch	RAC7		September 19, 2019
Sonic Racing	Hardlight	Sega	September 19, 2019
Spaceland	Tortuga Team		September 19, 2019
Speed Demons	Radiangames		September 19, 2019
Spelldrifter	Free Range Games		September 19, 2019
Spek.	RAC7		September 19, 2019
Spidersaurs	WayForward		September 19, 2019
Stellar Commanders	Blindflug Studios		September 19, 2019
Stranded Sails	Lemonbomb Entertainment	Shifty Eye Games	September 19, 2019
Super Impossible Road	Wonderful Lasers	Rogue Games	September 19, 2019
Tangle Tower	SFB Games		September 19, 2019
The Enchanted World	AI Interactive	Noodlecake Studios	September 19, 2019
The Get Out Kids	Frosty Pop		September 19, 2019
The Pinball Wizard	Frosty Pop		September 19, 2019
tint.	Lykkegaard		September 19, 2019
Towaga: Among Shadows	Sunnyside Games	Noodlecake Studios	September 19, 2019
Various Daylife	DokiDoki Groove Works	Square Enix	September 19, 2019
Way of the Turtle	Illusion Labs		September 19, 2019
What the Golf?	Triband	The Label	September 19, 2019
Where Cards Fall	The Game Band	Snowman	September 19, 2019
Word Laces	Minimega		September 19, 2019
Nightmare Farm	Hit-Point		October 6, 2019
Pilgrims	Amanita Design		October 6, 2019
Redout: Space Assault	34BigThings		October 6, 2019
The Bradwell Conspiracy	A Brave Plan	Bossa Studios	October 6, 2019
Decoherence	Efecto Estudios		October 11, 2019
Inmost	Hidden Layer Games	Chucklefish	October 11, 2019
Mind Symphony	Empty Clip Studios		October 11, 2019
ShockRods	Stainless Games		October 11, 2019
Stela	SkyBox Labs		October 11, 2019
Ballistic Baseball	Gameloft		October 18, 2019
Manifold Garden	William Chyr Studio		October 18, 2019
Pac-Man Party Royale	Pastagames	Bandai Namco Entertainment	October 18, 2019
Things That Go Bump	Tinybop		October 18, 2019
Fallen Knight	FairPlay Studios		October 25, 2019
Hogwash	Bossa Studios		October 25, 2019
Lifelike: Chapter One	kunabi brother		October 25, 2019
Tales of Memo	Tendays Studio		October 25, 2019
Yaga - The Roleplaying Folktale	Breadcrumbs Interactive	Versus Evil	October 25, 2019
Jumper Jon	Ogre Pixel		November 1, 2019
Monomals	Picomy		November 1, 2019
Super Mega Mini Party	Red Games Co.		November 1, 2019
Star Fetched	Crescent Moon Games		November 1, 2019
Mosaic	Krillbite Studio	Raw Fury	November 1, 2019
Discolored	Godbey Games	Shifty Eye Games	November 8, 2019
Guildlings	Sirvo Studios		November 8, 2019
Marble It Up: Mayhem	The Marble Collective		November 8, 2019
Sociable Soccer (Note: Released on the service until 2021)	Tower Studios	Rogue Games	November 8, 2019
Takeshi and Hiroshi	Oink Games		November 8, 2019
UFO on Tape: First Contact	Revolutionary Concepts		November 8, 2019
Rosie's Reality	RosieReality (Note: A startup company by Wyss Zurich, a startup accelerator owned by ETH Zurich and University of Zurich)		November 15, 2019
Steven Universe: Unleash the Light	Grumpyface Studios	Cartoon Network Games	November 27, 2019
Ultimate Rivals: The Rink	Bit Fry Game Studios		December 12, 2019
Lego Builder's Journey	Light Brick Studio	Lego	December 20, 2019
Doomsday Vault	Flightless		January 3, 2020
No Way Home	SMG Studio		January 10, 2020
Kings of the Castle	Frosty Pop		January 17, 2020
Butter Royale	Mighty Bear Games		January 24, 2020
Secret Oops!	MixedBag		January 31, 2020
Charrua Soccer	Batovi Games Studio		February 7, 2020
Loud House: Outta Control	Double Stallion Games	Nickelodeon	February 14, 2020
Crossy Road Castle	Hipster Whale		February 27, 2020
Roundguard	Wonderbelly Games		March 13, 2020
Spyder	Sumo Digital		March 20, 2020
Beyond Blue	E-Line Media		April 17, 2020
A Fold Apart	Lightning Rod Games		April 17, 2020
Neversong	Atmos Games	Serenity Forge	May 1, 2020
The_Otherside	Barbacube	The Label	May 8, 2020
Winding Worlds	KO_OP		May 15, 2020
Towers of Everland	Cobra Mobile		May 22, 2020
SpongeBob: Patty Pursuit	Old Skull Games	Nickelodeon	May 28, 2020
Little Orpheus	The Chinese Room	Sumo Digital	June 12, 2020
Beyond a Steel Sky	Revolution Software		June 25, 2020
Creaks	Amanita Design		July 10, 2020
Necrobarista	Route 59		July 17, 2020
The Lullaby of Life	1 Simple Game		July 24, 2020
Game of Thrones: Tale of Crows	That Silly Studio	Devolver Digital	August 7, 2020
Next Stop Nowhere	Night School Studio		August 14, 2020
Samurai Jack: Battle Through Time	Soleil	Adult Swim Games	August 21, 2020
The Last Campfire	Hello Games		August 27, 2020
World's End Club	Too Kyo Games	IzanagiGames	September 4, 2020
A Monster's Expedition	Draknek & Friends		September 10, 2020
Marble Knights	WayForward		September 18, 2020
Slash Quest	Big Green Pillow	Noodlecake Studios	October 2, 2020
The Survivalists	Team17		October 9, 2020
The Collage Atlas	John William Evelyn	Robot House Games	October 16, 2020
South of the Circle	State of Play Games		October 30, 2020
Reigns: Beyond	Nerial	Devolver Digital	November 6, 2020
All of You	Alike Studio		November 6, 2020
The Pathless	Giant Squid	Annapurna Interactive	November 12, 2020
Warp Drive	Supergonk		November 27, 2020
Alba: A Wildlife Adventure	ustwo		December 11, 2020
Oceanhorn: Chronos Dungeon	Cornfox & Bros.		January 8, 2021
NUTS	Joon, Pol, Muutsch, Char & Tofi	Noodlecake Studios	January 22, 2021
Spire Blast	Orbital Knight		January 22, 2021
Populous Run	FIFTYTWO		January 29, 2021
lumen.	Lykkegaard		February 5, 2021
Survival Z	Ember Entertainment		February 19, 2021
SP!NG	SMG Studio		March 5, 2021
Cozy Grove	Spry Fox		March 19, 2021
Farm It!!	Tummy Games		March 26, 2021
Hitchhiker - A Mystery Game	Mad About Pandas	Versus Evil	March 26, 2021
Fantasian	Mistwalker		April 1, 2021
Wonderbox: The Adventure Maker	Aquiris Game Studio		April 1, 2021
Cut the Rope Remastered	Paladin Studios		April 2, 2021
Easy Come Easy Golf (Note: Originally released as Clap Hanz Golf)	Clap Hanz		April 2, 2021
NBA 2K21 Arcade Edition	Visual Concepts	2K	April 2, 2021
Simon's Cat - Story Time	Tactile Games		April 2, 2021
SongPop Party	FreshPlanet	Gameloft	April 2, 2021
Star Trek: Legends	Emerald City Games	Tilting Point	April 2, 2021
Taiko no Tatsujin Pop Tap Beat	Bandai Namco Amusement Lab	Bandai Namco Entertainment	April 2, 2021
The Oregon Trail	Gameloft		April 2, 2021
World of Demons	PlatinumGames		April 2, 2021
Legends of Kingdom Rush	Ironhide Game Studio		June 11, 2021
Frenzic: Overtime	The Iconfactory		June 18, 2021
Solitaire Stories	Red Games Co.		July 2, 2021
Ultimate Rivals: The Court	Bit Fry Game Studios		July 9, 2021
Alto's Odyssey: Remastered	Land & Sea	Snowman	July 16, 2021
Angry Birds Reloaded	Rovio Entertainment		July 16, 2021
Doodle God Universe	JoyBits		July 16, 2021
Detonation Racing	Electric Square		July 30, 2021
Super Leap Day	Nitrome		August 6, 2021
wurdweb	Aran & Adriaan		August 13, 2021
Tetris Beat	N3TWORK		August 20, 2021
Baldo: The Guardian Owls	NAPS team		August 27, 2021
MasterChef: Learn to Cook!	Old Skull Games	Tilting Point	September 3, 2021
Zen Pinball Party	Zen Studios		September 3, 2021
Zookeeper World	Kiteretsu		September 10, 2021
Castlevania: Grimoire of Souls	Konami		September 17, 2021
Temple Run: Puzzle Adventure	Scopely		September 17, 2021
Lego Star Wars Battles	TT Games		September 24, 2021
NBA 2K22 Arcade Edition	Visual Concepts	2K	October 19, 2021
Transformers: Tactical Arena	Red Games Co.		November 5, 2021
Lego Star Wars: Castaways	Gameloft		November 19, 2021
Disney Melee Mania	Mighty Bear Games		December 17, 2021
Nickelodeon Extreme Tennis	Old Skull Games	Viacom International	January 21, 2022
Wylde Flowers	Studio Drydock		February 18, 2022
Gibbon: Beyond the Trees	Broken Rules		February 25, 2022
Alto's Adventure: Remastered	Land & Sea	Snowman	March 25, 2022
Gear.Club Stradale	Eden Games		April 8, 2022
Moonshot - A Journey Home	Morsel Interactive	Noodlecake Studios	April 4, 2022
Badland Party	HypeHype		May 6, 2022
Warped Kart Racers	Electric Square		May 20, 2022
Frogger and the Rumbling Ruins	Q-Games	Konami	June 3, 2022
Cooking Mama: Cuisine!	Office Create		June 17, 2022
Air Twister	Ys Net		June 24, 2022
Subway Surfers Tag	SYBO		July 15, 2022
HEROish	Sunblink		July 22, 2022
Amazing Bomberman	Konami		August 3, 2022
Jetpack Joyride 2	Halfbrick Studios		August 19, 2022
Hanx101 Trivia	BlueLine Studios		September 2, 2022
Horizon Chase 2	Aquiris Game Studio		September 9, 2022
Shovel Knight Dig	Yacht Club Games		September 23, 2022
NBA 2K23 Arcade Edition	Visual Concepts	2K	October 18, 2022
stitch.	Lykkegard		October 28, 2022
Football Manager Touch	Sports Interactive	Sega	November 8, 2022
SpongeBob SolitairePants	Chain Reaction Games	Viacom International	October 29, 2022
JellyCar Worlds	Walaber Entertainment		December 8, 2022
My Little Pony: Mane Merge	Gameloft		December 16, 2022
Episode XOXO	Episode Interactive		January 6, 2023
Illustrated	Borderleap		January 13, 2023
Pocket Card Jockey: Ride On!	Game Freak		January 20, 2023
Squiggle Drop	Snickerdoodle Games	Noodlecake Studios	January 27, 2023
Castle Crumble	Orbital Knight		February 3, 2023
Farmside	Topia Studios	Team17 USA	February 17, 2023
Kimono Cats	HumaNature Studios		March 3, 2023
Doctor Who: Hidden Mysteries	Whaleapp	Tilting Point	April 7, 2023
Summon Quest	Topia Studios	Team17 USA	April 21, 2023
Cityscapes: Sim Builder	Magic Fuel Games	Playstack	May 4, 2023
Disney SpellStruck	Artist Arcade		May 4, 2023
TMNT Splintered Fate	Super Evil Megacorp	Viacom International	May 4, 2023
What the Car?	Triband		May 4, 2023
Jet Dragon	Grezzo		May 26, 2023
Ridiculous Fishing EX	KO_OP	Vlambeer	July 14, 2023
Hello Kitty Island Adventure	Sunblink		July 28, 2023
finity.	Seabaa		August 21, 2023
Samba de Amigo: Party-Go-Go	Sega		August 29, 2023
Japanese Rural Life Adventure	GAME START		September 15, 2023
Junkworld TD	Ironhide Game Studio		September 22, 2023
Cypher 007	Pixelbite Games	Tilting Point	September 29, 2023
NBA 2K24 Arcade Edition	Visual Concepts	2K	September 29, 2023
Cut the Rope 3	Paladin Studios	ZeptoLab	October 13, 2023
Disney Dreamlight Valley Arcade Edition	Gameloft		December 5, 2023
Puzzle & Dragons Story	GungHo Online Entertainment		December 5, 2023
Sonic Dream Team	Hardlight	Sega	December 5, 2023
Cornsweeper	wbuttr		January 4, 2024
Tamagotchi Adventure Kingdom	Alike Studio	Bandai Namco Entertainment	January 4, 2024
BEAST: Bio Exo Arena Suit Team	Oh BiBi		February 1, 2024
Crayola Adventures	Red Games Co.		March 7, 2024
Puyo Puyo Puzzle Pop	h.a.n.d	Sega	April 4, 2024
Rabbids Multiverse	Ubisoft Da Nang	Ubisoft	June 6, 2024
Outlanders 2	Pomelo Games		July 3, 2024
Temple Run Adventures	Imangi Studios		August 1, 2024
NFL Retro Bowl '25	New Star Games		September 5, 2024
Puzzle Sculpt	Schell Games		September 5, 2024
NBA 2K25 Arcade Edition	Visual Concepts	2K	October 3, 2024
Drive Ahead! Carcade	Dodreams		November 7, 2024
Wheel of Fortune Daily	Frosty Pop		November 7, 2024
Boggle: Arcade Edition	Zynga		December 5, 2024
Talking Tom Blast Park	Outfit7		December 5, 2024
Gears & Goo	Resolution Games		January 10, 2025
Skate City: New York	Agens	Snowman	January 10, 2025
Three Kingdoms Heroes	Kou Shibusawa	Koei Tecmo	January 10, 2025
PGA Tour Pro Golf	Hypgames		February 6, 2025
Katamari Damacy Rolling Live	Bandai Namco Entertainment		April 3, 2025
Space Invaders Infinity Gene Evolve	Taito		April 3, 2025
What the Clash?	Triband		May 1, 2025
with My Buddy	Neilo		May 1, 2025
Uno: Arcade Edition	Mattel163		June 5, 2025
Angry Birds Bounce	Rovio Entertainment		July 3, 2025
Everybody Shogi	Altplus		August 7, 2025
Let's Go Mightycat!	PONOS Corporation		August 7, 2025
Play-Doh World	Scary Beasties		August 7, 2025
Worms Across Worlds	Behaviour Interactive	Team17	August 7, 2025
Jeopardy! Daily	Frosty Pop		September 4, 2025
NBA 2K26 Arcade Edition	Visual Concepts	2K	October 16, 2025
MySims	Electronic Arts		November 6, 2025
MySims Kingdom	Electronic Arts		November 6, 2025
Toca Boca Jr Classics	Toca Boca		November 6, 2025
Cult of the Lamb	Massive Monster	Devolver Digital	December 4, 2025
PowerWash Simulator	FuturLab		December 4, 2025
SpongeBob: Patty Pursuit 2	Old Skull Games	Viacom International	December 4, 2025
Cozy Caravan	5 Lives Studios		January 8, 2026
Sago Mini Jinja's Garden	Sago Mini		January 8, 2026
Civilization VII	Firaxis Games	2K	February 5, 2026
Felicity's Door	AREA 35		February 5, 2026
Retrocade	Resolution Games		February 5, 2026
Oceanhorn 3	Cornfox & Bros.		March 5, 2026
HYKE:Northern Light(s)	Blast Edge Games	Akatsuki Games, Aniplex	April 2, 2026
Nick Jr. Replay!	Viacom International		May 7, 2026
Perchang World	Perchang		May 7, 2026
Mini Football Legends	Miniclip		June 4, 2026
Family Feud Pocket	Gameloft		June 30, 2026

== See also ==
- GameClub
- Google Play Pass
- Xbox Game Pass
