= Aerial Knight's DropShot =

2026 video game

Aerial_Knight's DropShot
- Developer: Aerial_Knight
- Publisher: Aerial_Knight
- Platforms: PlayStation 5; Windows; Xbox Series X/S
- Release: February 17, 2026

Aerial_Knight's DropShot is a 2026 first-person shooter video game developed and published by Aerial_Knight.

== Gameplay ==
DropShot is a high-speed FPS where players race through the sky to reach the ground before opponents, while shooting them out of the sky with finger gun bullets. Limited ammo is available to players. Players use tactics such as slipstream to counter enemies. Rounds are designed to play fast, lasting around 60 seconds. The game features 50 levels.

== Development and release ==
Developer Aerial_Knight is based in Detroit, Michigan. In March 2025, the game was announced by Aerial_Knight for release on PC and Steam.

The developer was previously known for Aerial_Knight’s Never Yield and Aerial_Knight’s We Never Yield. A core team of just three developers built the game without a publisher. Aerial_Knight is based in Detroit.

Dropshot was released on February 17, 2026, for PlayStation 5, Windows, and Xbox Series X/S. The game was made available on Xbox Game Pass at launch. In May 2026, developer Aerial_Knight released a free update for the game titled DropShot with a Vengeance.

== Reception ==
Reception

Aggregate score
Aggregator	Score
OpenCritic	69/100 (Note: Based on 8 reviews)

Polygon reviewed the game positively, saying it was a "focused concept" but was held back from hitting its mark. The Verge also reviewed the game positively, but noted its short length.

In a mixed review, Six One Indie gave credit to the game's premise but was critical of its glitches and overall execution.
