= Account sharing =

Process of sharing login information with multiple users

Account sharing, also known as credential sharing, is the process of sharing login information with multiple users to access online accounts or services. This can include sharing information like e-mail addresses, usernames and passwords for social media accounts, subscription services, gaming platforms or other online services.

== Reasons for account sharing ==
Account sharing is a common practice, especially among younger users who may not have the financial resources to pay for multiple accounts or subscriptions. It is also commonly used among families or groups of friends who want to access a shared account or service. Another reason could be to gain special features that depends on a single account like special items in a game account.

People may also share passwords with their significant others as a symbol of affection or absolute trust.

== Reasons against account sharing ==
Account sharing is prohibited by the terms of service of many online accounts, such as Google and Facebook. It can result in account suspensions or even termination, possibly causing users to lose access to important data or services. On the other hand, account sharing can lose money for the service the account is being shared for.

Account sharing can also make it easier for hackers to gain access to multiple accounts using a single set of login credentials. This can lead to sensitive data being compromised or accounts being taken over by unauthorized users. The person the information is shared with could act careless and not secure enough with the login data or could steal the information for other purposes as a social engineering-strategy.

== Prevention ==
Some services offer combined accounts, such as multiple family accounts (Family Sharing) with special child safety options or software license for multiple company accounts at a cheaper price to prevent account sharing. Another system to make account sharing more difficult is the Multi-factor authentication which often requires the sharer to instantly share the information on their device with the receiver.

In 2022, Netflix limited where accounts could be used, based on IP addresses. Their terms of service state that "personal and non-commercial use only and may not be shared with individuals beyond your household". The company later released paid options for account sharing, and is expected to remove free account sharing in 2023.

== Legality ==
In the United Kingdom, sharing passwords for certain services, such as streaming services, without authorization is considered copyright infringement.
