= Mosaic (video game) =

2019 adventure game

- App icon
- Developer: Krillbite Studio
- Publisher: Raw Fury
- Platforms: iOS, tvOS, Linux, Windows, Nintendo Switch, Xbox One, PlayStation 4
- Release: iOS, tvOS; November 1, 2019; Linux, Windows; December 5, 2019; Nintendo Switch, Xbox One; January 23, 2020; PlayStation 4; February 11, 2020
- Genres: Adventure, art
- Mode: Single-player

Mosaic is an adventure game developed by Krillbite Studio and published by Raw Fury. It was originally released on iOS and tvOS through Apple Arcade, with releases for Windows and Linux in 2019 and Nintendo Switch, Xbox One and PlayStation 4 in 2020. The game serves as social commentary on modern life; the main character is an isolated office worker who lacks human contact and spends a large amount of time on his smartphone, seeing the world only in dull colors. He gradually starts encountering moments of beauty and realizing he should escape the daily grind. It received mixed reviews from critics, who thought the gameplay was overly dull and the message too simplistic, though they enjoyed some moments in it.

== Reception ==
Mosaic has a "mixed or average" Metacritic rating, and on OpenCritic, it received a "fair" approval rating of 48%.

Reception

Aggregate scores
Aggregator	Score
Metacritic	70/100
OpenCritic	48% recommend

Review scores
Publication	Score
Nintendo Life	5/10 stars
PC Gamer (US)	61/100
TouchArcade	3.5/5 stars

Alex Spencer of PC Gamer gave the game a mixed review, describing the entire game as "housing" for a message about modern life that never "cuts any deeper than Daniel Ortberg's withering Black Mirror synopsis, 'what if phones but too much'." He said that it lacked meaningful gameplay, though he called its occasional bright spots rewarding. While calling it occasionally fascinating, he said that it was trying too hard to remind the player it was art.

Sergio Velasquez of TouchArcade was also mixed on the game, saying that despite being boring, it was an "experience" that showcases the problems with modern isolation. However, he called it "slow and frustrating" for non-introspective players who are simply seeking fun gameplay, calling its controls the worst part. While describing its story as "short and predictable", he summed it up as rewarding in the end.

Lloyd Coombes of Nintendo Life rated the game negatively, calling it intentionally mundane and comparing it to Limbo and Inside. However, he said it lacked a meaningful message besides the negative effects of technology on people's lives, and that it compared unfavorably to other commentary along those lines, such as Black Mirror. Saying that the game had a "vital message" that it couldn't enunciate, he summed it up as ultimately unfulfilling and depressing.

== Mosaic: BlipBlop ==
A clicker game called Mosaic: BlipBlop was released independently for iOS and Android in 2019. It is also featured in Mosaic as a minigame the protagonist can play, commenting on the vapid nature of mobile games. The standalone version functions as marketing for the full Mosaic game, showing the player fake ads for in-universe apps.
