= EA App =

Content delivery software by Electronic Arts

- Other names: EA Downloader; EA Link; EA Store; EA Download Manager; Origin
- Developer: Electronic Arts
- Release: November 11, 2005; 21 years ago
- Stable release: 13.631.0.6144
- Platform: Microsoft Windows; macOS
- Available in: 19 languages
- List of languages English, Chinese (Simplified, Traditional), Filipino, French, German, Indonesian, Italian, Japanese, Korean, Malay, Polish, Portuguese (Brazil), Russian, Spanish (Spain, Mexico), Thai, Turkish, Vietnamese
- Type: Digital distribution; Digital rights management; Social networking
- Website: www.ea.com/ea-app

The EA App (formerly Origin) is a digital distribution platform for Microsoft Windows and macOS, developed by Electronic Arts for downloading, and later purchasing and playing video games.

The EA App contains social features such as profile management, networking with friends with chat and direct game joining along with an in-game overlay, streaming via Twitch and sharing of game library and community integration with networking sites like Apple ID, Amazon, Facebook, Google, Discord, Steam, Twitch, Xbox network, and PlayStation Network. In 2011, Electronic Arts stated that they wanted their service to match Valve's Steam service, a primary competitor, by adding cloud game saves, auto-patching, achievements, and cross-platform releases. By 2013, the service had over 50 million registered users.

== Components ==
=== Origin store ===
Origin in February 2015

The Origin store allows users to browse and purchase games from Electronic Arts' catalogs. Instead of receiving a box, disc, or even CD key, purchased software is immediately attached to the user's Origin account and is to be downloaded with the corresponding Origin client. Origin guarantees download availability forever after purchase, and there is no limit to the number of times a game can be downloaded. Users may also add certain EA games to their Origin account by using CD keys from retail copies, and digital copies obtained from other digital distribution services; however, the addition of retail keys to Origin is restricted to games from 2009 onwards and older keys will not work even if the game is available on Origin, unless user contacts customer support.

=== Origin client ===
The Origin client is self-updating software that allows users to download games, expansion packs, content booster packs and patches from Electronic Arts. It shows the status of components available. The Origin client is designed to be similar to its competitor, Steam. The Origin In Game overlay client can be disabled while playing games. The client also features chat features such as a Friends List and a group chat options (implemented in version 9.3). Client and download performance has been patched and improved in past updates.

=== Origin Access ===
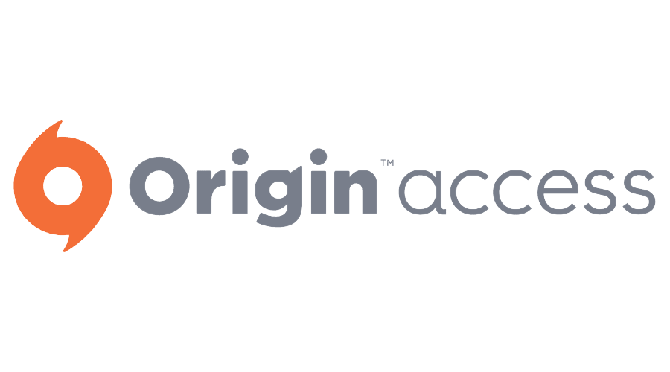
Origin Access logo

EA released a subscription service for accessing and playing their games on PC in 2016 originally called EA Access; via the Origin client, this was called Origin Access. Users can choose between paying a monthly or yearly subscription fee to access a large collection of EA titles (known as The Vault). Origin Access subscribers also get a 10% discount on all Origin purchases. Starting in March 2018, Origin Access starting offering titles from Warner Bros. Interactive Entertainment and was looking to add other publishers' titles, including those from indie games.

At E3 2018 EA announced a premium tier for Origin Access called Origin Access Premier, that allows to play future EA games early, the games will be full version in contrast to the "First Trials" giving to basic Origin Access members. To streamline branding, EA renamed both EA Access and Origin Access both to EA Play, with the Origin Access Premier named to EA Play Pro.

== History ==
EA Downloader was launched on November 11, 2005. It was replaced by EA Link in November 2006, adding trailers, demos and special content to the content delivery service. In September 2007, it was once again replaced by the combination of EA Store and EA Download Manager. Users purchase from the EA Store website and use the downloadable EADM client to download their games. Games bought via EA Link were downloadable using the EA Download Manager. The store and client was reopened under the Origin name on June 3, 2011. In October 2011, EA added games from third-party publishers THQ, Warner Bros. Games and Capcom.

The digital distribution software was first used to deliver the Battlefield 2: Special Forces expansion pack, and subsequently most EA titles. The biggest product launch on the software is Spore Creature Creator. EA acquired the trademark Origin when it purchased Origin Systems in 1992. Origin Systems was a major game studio in the 1980s and 1990s, best known for its Ultima, Wing Commander, and Crusader game franchises.

=== Removal of Crysis 2 from Steam and Origin exclusives ===
Shortly after the launch of Origin, Crysis 2 was pulled from Steam and appeared on EA's website with an "only on Origin" claim, though it remained available on other distribution services. EA has since stated that Valve removed Crysis 2 due to imposed "business terms" and that "this was not an EA decision or the result of any action by EA."

Since then, Crysis 2: Maximum Edition (a re-release of Crysis 2 with all the DLCs) has been released on Steam, matching EA's story about pulling Crysis 2 due to DLC restraints. EA confirmed that Battlefield 3 would not be available through Steam. The game was available for purchase on other non-Origin services such as GameFly, Green Man Gaming or GamersGate, but the Origin client had to be used regardless of where the game was purchased. Battlefield 3 would eventually appear on Steam nine years after its release, in June 2020.

Starting from the release of Battlefield 3 in 2011 until November 2019, every first-party game EA published on PC was exclusive to the Origin service. In late 2019, EA began releasing their games on Steam again, starting with Star Wars Jedi: Fallen Order; however, the game still uses the Origin client to launch. EA started to release their existing games on Steam in June 2020.

=== EA app ===
In September 2020, EA announced its plans to retire Origin in favor for a new desktop client that will support the new EA Play and EA Play Pro subscriptions. The new client began its beta test in September 2020. The new client, named EA was released on October 7, 2022, for Windows users with a deployed migration to existing users of Origin. The Origin client remains available for macOS users using macOS Mojave or older.

The Origin app was retired on April 17, 2025.

== Reception ==
In 2012, Nathan Grayson of Rock Paper Shotgun said that "beyond being a branded storefront, I still don't understand what larger purpose Origin serves. In truth, I'd actually like to see it, er, pick up some steam, because I don't think it's healthy for Valve to not have a viable rival in this space. But this − at least, so far − isn't the way to do it. Origin's neither sprinted to the point of being neck-and-neck with Steam nor has it differentiated itself in any meaningful way. Instead, it's just puttered along at its own languid pace, harmlessly reminding us of its existence every time we pop open a big-name EA game."

In October 2022, Alice O'Connor of Rock Paper Shotgun called Origin "much-maligned" and "inconvenience you must accept to play the EA games which require it, and beyond that it is useless." The login system was criticized for not remembering the login information and logging the user out repeatedly. She further panned the login system, saying "no matter how many times I tell it to remember my login, it will soon forget and log me out." The app was summarized: "If you judge the EA app as a launcher and as a storefront, it is bland, featureless, and wholly forgettable. It is outclassed by its rivals in every way. You would only ever use if you were forced to." In December 2022, Joshua Wolens of PC Gamer said: "Have you ever launched a game from Steam, only to watch Origin or UPlay spark to life, and thought 'Ah, yes, how pleased I am to see you'? Of course you haven't, unless you own EA or Ubisoft stock. These things don't exist to make games better, they exist to give business liches and C-suite types a little warm glow."

In December 2022, it was reported that most games that use the EA App are broken on Steam Deck because the app causes problems for the Proton compatibility layer. EA said it does not officially support the Steam Deck. Joshua Wolens of PC Gamer also criticized the login system, saying: "I want to stop getting up off my sofa to enter a 2FA code after the EA App signs me out for the millionth time, and Steam Deck users want their games to actually work."

=== Security weaknesses ===
EA has been criticized for not encrypting Origin's XMPP chat functionality, which is available in Origin and in Origin-powered games. Unencrypted data includes account numbers, session tokens, as well as the message contents itself. With this type of data, user accounts might get compromised.

=== Accusations of spying ===
Origin's end-user license agreement (EULA) gives EA permission to collect information about users' computers regardless of its relation to the Origin program itself, including "application usage (including but not limited to successful installation and/or removal), software, software usage and peripheral hardware." Initially, the EULA also contained a passage permitting EA to more explicitly monitor activity as well as to edit or remove material at their discretion. A report by the news magazine Der Spiegel covered the allegations. In response to the controversy, EA issued a statement claiming they "do not have access to information such as pictures, documents or personal data, which have nothing to do with the execution of the Origin program on the system of the player, neither will they be collected by us." EA also added a sentence to the EULA stating that they would not "use spyware or install spyware on users' machines", although users must still consent to allowing EA to collect information about their computers.

=== Legal issues in Germany ===
According to reports in German newspapers, the German version of Origin's EULA violates several German laws, mainly laws protecting consumers and users' privacy. According to Thomas Hoeren, a judge and professor for information, telecommunication and media law at the University of Münster, the German version of the EULA is a direct translation of the original without any modifications and its clauses are "null and void".

=== Origin account bans ===
There have been several instances of EA enforcing such bans for what critics argue are comparatively minor infractions, such as making rude comments in EA or BioWare's official forums or in chat. During March 2011, a user named "Arno" was banned for allegedly making the comment "Have you sold your souls to the EA devil?" Arno's account was banned for 72 hours which prevented him from playing any of his Origin games. After reporting on the details of the incident, website Rock, Paper, Shotgun received a statement from EA saying that Arno's account ban was a mistake, and that future violations on the forums would not interfere with Origin users' access to their games.

Later during October and November 2011, one user was banned for posting about teabagging dead players. Another user received a 72-hour account suspension for posting a link to his own network troubleshooting guide in the EA forums. EA interpreted this as a "commercial" link, even though the same link had been posted elsewhere in the forums, and EA's own corporate support site and FAQ. One user was permanently banned for submitting a forum post containing the portmanteau "e-peen", which is slang for "electronic penis."
