= Sneaky Sasquatch =

2019 adventure video game by RAC7

- Developer: RAC7
- Publisher: RAC7
- Programmer: Jesse Ringrose
- Artist: Jason Ennis
- Composers: scntfc, A Shell in the Pit
- Engine: Unity
- Platforms: iOS, macOS, tvOS
- Release: September 19, 2019
- Genre: Adventure
- Mode: Single-player

Sneaky Sasquatch is a 2019 adventure video game developed and published by Canadian studio RAC7 for iOS, macOS and tvOS. It was released as a launch title for Apple Arcade. The game's scenery is inspired by Squamish, British Columbia, Canada. The game music is provided by A Shell in the Pit and scntfc.

Sneaky Sasquatch received positive reviews from critics. It is considered one of the killer apps for Apple Arcade alongside What the Golf?, sustaining relatively consistent popularity in comparison with other games on the service.

== Gameplay ==
The player plays as a Sasquatch, who lives near a campground and is friends with local wildlife. These animals serve various roles throughout the game (a raccoon serving as a shopkeeper, ducks doing construction, a hungry bear that gives coins in exchange for food, etc.). Gameplay initially revolves around stealing food from campers and hiding from park rangers. After obtaining an outfit, Sasquatch mingles among humans and participates in human activities, competes in sports, and later can get a bank account and get jobs like a doctor, police officer, or an office executive.

Sasquatch sneaking to steal food from a cooler

Sasquatch requires food and sleep. Sasquatch has a food meter that can deplete due to the passage of time or sleeping.

When one second passes in real life, one minute passes in the game; therefore, the in-game daylight lasts for around 12 minutes. If Sasquatch stays up too late without consuming caffeine, he falls asleep and wakes up in his main house where the raccoon has dragged him to. To avoid this, Sasquatch needs to reach an available bed and sleep in it.

If Sasquatch stays with an empty hunger meter for several minutes, he passes out and is dragged back to the house by the raccoon as well. The raccoon feeds Sasquatch 2 hunger points, so Sasquatch pays 20 coins or all coins if Sasquatch has less than 20 coins. Fishing is also a source of food, fish can also be given to fishermen in exchange for coins.

If Sasquatch runs into traffic and gets hit, Sasquatch's health meter will go down each time. When the health meter is down to zero, if Sasquatch gets hit again, an ambulance will arrive to the scene where a paramedic will provide him with first aid. If Sasquatch does not own any disguises, they can visit Doctor Duck for medical attention.

=== Authorities ===
When Sasquatch does not wear any disguise, humans are afraid of him and alert the local authorities (rangers or police officers) whenever they see him. With a disguise on, regular people assume Sasquatch is a human, but authorities like rangers or police still see through it. Later in the game, Sasquatch obtains outfits that also prevent authorities from recognizing him, although the Island Ranger will recognize Sasquatch regardless of his disguise. The firefighter outfit will not work in this instance.

Aside from being recognized as a Sasquatch, shoplifting, carjacking, stealing from the port, going into unauthorized areas, stealing gasoline, or hitting people with a vehicle may trigger authorities to pursue a Sasquatch. When Sasquatch is caught by rangers, he is taken away from the area and into a nearby forest clearing specific to that area. When Sasquatch is caught by the town police, he spends a night in jail and is released the next day at noon in-game. When Sasquatch is caught by the Island Ranger, he is brought to the ferry entrance. When he is caught by the port security, he is brought to the port entrance. If Sasquatch chops down a tree near an NPC, the ranger will be alerted.

=== Activities ===
One of the activities required for progress in Chapter 1 of the storyline is golf, featuring matches from 3 to 9 holes.

There are many racing events. Go-Karting, car racing, and drifting competitions take place on the race track. Entering harder competitions requires passing increasingly harder driving tests, which are a challenge by themselves. The longest car race, The Sasquatch 100, is 100 laps long and lasts for roughly 20 minutes, depending on the vehicle you use. Car racing is required for the completion of Chapter 1.

Near the island, there is boat racing and canoeing. There is a race similar to the Sasquatch 100 called the Fastboat 25 that takes a similar amount of time to complete.

At a dirt track, there is dirt bike racing and freestyle, monster truck racing, car-crushing, and ice racing.

Skiing includes two types of events: fastest descent over several pistes, and freestyle, where the goal is to perform the hardest jumps. This freestyle activity is required for the completion of Chapter 1.

Snowball fights are played in several formats, such as last man standing, team against team, hitting several targets in a limited time, or survival against multiple attackers.

Surfing requires the player to do jumps and spins before being overtaken by the wave. The player needs to upgrade their surfboard by beating a lineup of opponents of increasing difficulty.

An arcade in the town hosts four arcade video games made in the style of the late 1980s to early 1990s.

Several mini-games are more relaxed collecting activities, such as scuba diving (collecting trash underwater), fishing, mushroom foraging, and collecting dinosaur bones for the museum. However, some rarer varieties of fish and mushrooms are hard to find and may require many in-game days to find.

Sasquatch can adopt a runaway dog, a Boston Terrier, which requires care and food to grow (constituting a simple virtual pet mini-game), and eventually becomes helpful in finding expensive truffles. The dog is based on Jesse Ringrose's dog.

As of the latest update, Sasquatch can also take photos of birds around the map and turn them in to a Birdwatching NPC.

As of the most recent update, Sasquatch can befriend 67 characters in the game. He can do activities and mini-games to satisfy his friends and increase the relationship between Sasquatch and his friends. This activity is required for the completion of Chapter 4.

=== Jobs ===
Initially, the only source of coins is selling spare food to an always hungry bear, and from fox mischief from a fox who can be found in several places waiting for Sasquatch. As Sasquatch becomes integrated into human society, he can be hired for several human jobs.

An office job in an evil corporation called R Corp involves Sasquatch working his way up the corporate ladder. Initially, he works in the office's mailroom, delivering mail across floors 2-5 of the building. Next, he works in IT, fixing computers, and eventually is promoted to an executive, attending meetings, signing paperwork, and occasionally playing golf with the CEO of R Corp, Mr. Pemberton, the company's CEO. This job is required for the completion of Chapter 2 of the storyline.

Sasquatch can also become a delivery person, delivering packages to residents and stores all over the map.

The delivery service and taxi jobs require the player to drive between certain points of the map within a limited time. The taxi job also requires driving carefully so as not to scare the passengers. The police job is mostly about working as a highway patrol officer, writing tickets to drivers, and collecting fines. The possible violations include speeding, driving without a license, insurance, or prescribed glasses, driving without headlights at night, or keeping food under the car hood. This job is required for the completion of Chapter 3. The local port offers three jobs: forklift driver, crane operator and security guard. After gaining the port's trust, Sasquatch can pull off a burglary himself for large profits, though that is a challenging activity with high chances of being caught. Completing all three jobs at the Port gains Sasquatch the title of Junior Supervisor, which gives him higher security clearance and a personal forklift. A Junior Supervisor is required for the completion of Chapter 4. Another job is a substitute captain of the local ferry, sailing between the island and the mainland. Later in the game, Sasquatch can sail the ferry to a campground on an island and eventually bring other people who will pay to camp at the campground.

Sasquatch can also invest 1000 coins into a local food delivery service called Spaghetti Hotline. He can get a share of the profits, upgrade the Spaghetti Hotline kitchen, and advertise on billboards and newspapers for extra profit.

After Sasquatch is elected mayor in the 4th Chapter of the storyline (version 1.9), Sasquatch can fund money to customize the town in the town hall. However, Sasquatch does not get paid as mayor.

In the Hospital Update (version 1.9.8), the player can be a paramedic or a doctor. They earn a medical diploma from an infomercial on any TV on the map for 5000 coins. Sasquatch, as both a doctor or a paramedic, can complete tasks and receive paychecks which can be deposited into the bank to receive money in their bank account.

In the Fire Station Update (version 2.0), Sasquatch can now be a firefighter. He needs a driver's license and needs to have been to the Ski Mountain and the Island to become a firefighter.

Sasquatch can hijack the bus and drive it for 15 real-life minutes. When he returns the next day, the bus driver explains that the time away from driving allowed him to earn a medical diploma. He then gives Sasquatch a bus driver disguise, allowing him to work as a bus driver.

=== Property ===
The money can be spent to buy multiple vehicles: cars, motorbikes, and boats, and then to upgrade and customize them. Additionally, Sasquatch can expand his house and buy new furniture, purchase additional houses in other parts of the map, or buy some expensive vanity outfits and accessories.

=== Businesses ===
There are two different businesses Sasquatch can invest in, in order to gain a passive income later. These businesses include a private campground on a small island and a spaghetti delivery service in the town.

=== Seasonal events ===
There are two seasonal events. The winter holiday event adds additional prizes for the snowball fight mini-game and the snowman building activity.

The Halloween event features trick-or-treating with dressing into multiple outfits, and several Halloween-themed mini-quests.

The prizes for both events are candies, which can be exchanged for corresponding holiday costumes, and decorations for Sasquatch's house. Both events can be started for a day at any time of the year by finding a certain character and paying them.

== Story ==
As of version 2.0.6, there are 4 chapters in the main storyline.

=== Chapter 1: Saving The Campground ===
The Sasquatch lives in a shack on the western portion of a campground where campers aren’t permitted. Hoping to prevent campers from being scared off, the ranger doesn't allow Sasquatch to leave the designated Western end of the campground, but Sasquatch often sneaks out with other animals. A CEO, Mr. Pemberton, tells the ranger that he will be clearcutting the trees of the campground to construct condominiums. Overhearing the conversation, the animals make a plan with Sasquatch to find a way to buy the park from Pemberton. The animals eventually find a layout of a treasure map, and with Sasquatch's help, they locate the pieces to the map and dig up the treasure, which they then use to keep the park. Having the campsite, the animals, and the park ranger hold a party hailing Sasquatch as a hero.

=== Chapter 2: Revenge On The Park ===
After the party, Sasquatch's friend Raccoon returns from the town, warning the animals that he heard that Pemberton seeks to take the park again, but by illegal means. Using a disguise and a code name to apply as an office worker, Sasquatch becomes an employee at Pemberton's enterprise by the name of R Corp, climbing the corporate ladder of the company until Sasquatch is given a special keycard used to access Pemberton's office. Sasquatch and Raccoon break inside the building while the building is closed, stealing evidence of the illegal plans and turning it over to the police. Pemberton is arrested, and the animals congratulate Sasquatch for foiling the plot.

=== Chapter 3: The Polluted Campground ===
After the party for saving the park again, the ranger discovers that the campground's lake has become polluted by unknown criminals. The police cannot investigate the pollution due to a lack of not having enough officers, so Sasquatch and the animals decide to investigate the pollution problem themselves. Disguising himself as a police officer looking to apply for the job, Sasquatch writes tickets to cars and/or boats to gain enough trust from the police chief to be promoted to a detective role for investigating the pollution. Several clues show that the source comes from the town sewers, so Sasquatch uses diving equipment to access the restricted sewage control room, confronting two criminals as they flood the lake with polluted water. The police let Sasquatch choose if they go to jail or not. Sasquatch later reverses the flow of sewage, removing the pollution from the lake.

=== Chapter 4: The Evil Mayor Election ===
Soon after, Sasquatch learns that the criminals were paid to pollute the lake by Mr. Pemberton's young son, Pemberton Jr. On the TV, he makes a speech that he will run in the upcoming mayoral election, and will release his father from prison if elected. Concerned about Pemberton's problem against the park, the animals convince Sasquatch to run against Pemberton Jr. in the election. Sasquatch campaigns under its code name and slowly gets voters through advertisements and by making friends with the citizens. Sasquatch defeats Pemberton Jr. by one vote, but as it returns to the campsite to celebrate, it learns that all the animals have disappeared and Mr. Pemberton has escaped from jail. Tracking them to the port, Sasquatch sees the Pembertons caging the animals inside a warehouse. With help from its friend Fox, Sasquatch breaks into the port at night, frees the animals, and fights a violent Pemberton Jr. by throwing oranges at him. At the last moment, Mr. Pemberton traps Sasquatch inside a cage and says to have him locked away as a zoo animal forever. The park ranger arrives and makes a circle around the Pembertons with a mob of Sasquatch's human friends, where Mr. Pemberton makes Sasquatch take off his disguise and shows them that Sasquatch is a Sasquatch. Sasquatch's friends are not surprised by this information, much to Mr. Pemberton's surprise. Having revealed the true identity of "the mayor", they cage up the Pembertons and free Sasquatch. The Pembertons are loaded onto a ship named “SS Never Coming Back” willingly to never return, while Sasquatch and its friends return to the park to host a party.

== Development ==
The game was created by Canadian indie studio RAC7, a two-person team in Vancouver, Canada. Among their previous titles were Splitter Critters which won iPhone Game of the Year and Apple Design Awards in 2017.

The setting of the game is based on the developers' native British Columbia, specifically Squamish in the early 1990s.

The game's prototype, Starvin' Sasquatch, was developed in 2015 for Ludum Dare 33 under the theme 'You Are the Monster'. The prototype retains the game's basic plot. The development continued after that competition, but they did not expect it to sell well on mobile, and put it on hold. After several years of inactivity, the game was expanded to be pitched for Apple Arcade, which allowed the developers not to worry about its monetization on the App Store. It was developed and released as a launch title for Apple Arcade alongside Spek.

Features like driving and minigames, such as car racing and golfing were added to enhance the absurd nature of the Sasquatch's participation in human activities. The main gameplay and the mini-games were influenced by a range of games such as Metal Gear Solid and Microsoft Golf 2.0. Developers mentioned that they are in the process of adding every type of game they ever wanted to make as a mini-game into Sneaky Sasquatch. The game has received various content updates, the most recent of which occurred in October 2025. Due to the game's success, Apple Inc. acquired RAC7 in May 2025 as its first acquisition of a video game developer.

== Reception ==
Sneaky Sasquatch ended 2020 as Apple Arcade's number 1 game in the United States, and number 5 in Canada, and has been recommended as a child friendly game by reviewers.

The game was awarded Apple Arcade Game of the Year in 2020. Part of the game's success has been attributed to players, particularly children, longing for outdoor activities during COVID-19 lockdowns, and a surprising amount of content behind what looks like a simple kids' game. Developers noticed that young child players enjoy even the simplest activities like eating and sleeping, and more hardcore gamers find full completion of the game a decent challenge.
