= Ubisoft Connect =

Video game service by Ubisoft

- Uplay PC client in 2016
- Other names: Ubisoft Game Launcher (2009–2012); Uplay (2012–2020)
- Developer: Massive Entertainment
- Release: 17 November 2009; 17 years ago
- Platform: Microsoft Windows, PlayStation 4, PlayStation 5, Xbox One, Xbox Series X/S, Nintendo Switch, Nintendo Switch 2
- Predecessor: Ubisoft Club
- Type: Digital distribution Content delivery Digital rights management Social networking
- Website: connect.ubisoft.com

Ubisoft Connect (formerly Ubisoft Game Launcher and Uplay) is a service for digital distribution, digital rights management, multiplayer and communication developed by Massive Entertainment to provide an experience similar to the achievements/trophies offered by various other game companies. The service is provided across various platforms. Ubisoft Connect is used exclusively by first-party Ubisoft Entertainment games, and although some third-party ones are sold through the Ubisoft store, they do not use the Ubisoft Connect platform.

== Features ==
Ubisoft Connect serves as a combination of a free reward system (formerly Ubisoft Club) and online profile system for players of Ubisoft games. While playing Ubisoft games, players can complete in-game achievements which earn points towards their profile. They can then redeem these points for in-game content across many Ubisoft games, typically as cosmetic items which can otherwise be purchased through microtransactions. Players can also maintain friend lists which will be used in various games to help with matchmaking or tied with certain in-game features.

The Ubisoft Connect client on personal computers also serves as a storefront and digital download management tool. Players can purchase Ubisoft games through its storefront and manage downloads and updates of games. The client also maintains digital rights management (DRM) for Ubisoft games, and is required to be run for any Ubisoft game, even if the game is purchased on a different storefront such as through Steam or the Epic Games Store.

An optional subscription service, Ubisoft+ (formerly Uplay+), allows subscribers to have access to Ubisoft's full library of games as well as immediate access to its newest games and closed beta tests for upcoming games.

== History ==
The former Uplay logo

The Uplay reward system was first introduced alongside the release of Assassin's Creed II on 17 November 2009. The Uplay reward system allowed players to connect with other gamers, and to earn rewards based on achievements (called "Actions") in Uplay-enabled games, with Ubisoft CEO Yves Guillemot stating that "the more you play, the more free goods you will be able to have".

On personal computers, Ubisoft had offered its Ubisoft Game Launcher to manage the downloads and updating of its games. The Uplay client was introduced on 3 July 2012 to replace the launcher, incorporating its features as well as management of Uplay rewards and a digital storefront for Ubisoft games.

Certain Ubisoft games required an online pass known as a "Uplay Passport" to access online and multiplayer content. In October 2013, Ubisoft announced that it would discontinue its use of online passes on future games, and made the Uplay Passport for Assassin's Creed IV: Black Flag available at no charge effective immediately.

Uplay+, a monthly subscription service giving the subscriber full access to over 100 games in the Ubisoft catalog including immediate access to new games and closed beta tests, was introduced during E3 2019. Uplay+ launched on September 3, 2019 in beta form, with full expansion in early 2020. The service was offered both through the Uplay store, as will be an option for Stadia users.

In October 2020, Uplay and the Ubisoft Club were merged into Ubisoft Connect, which would offer the same features but also enable current and future Ubisoft games to support cross-saves and cross-play between platforms, and support for cloud gaming platforms including Stadia and Amazon Luna. However, Ubisoft said that several of the older games in the UPlay library will not be transitioned to support Ubisoft Connect's features, and thus they unlocked all the Uplay rewards associated with these games for all users. As part of Ubisoft's transition from Uplay to Ubisoft Connect, the Uplay+ service was rebranded as Ubisoft+ in October 2020, with its offering expanded to include the Amazon Luna cloud gaming platform.

In July 2023, it was reported that Ubisoft had started to permanently delete accounts it deemed "inactive", including purchased games. The company said that this was incorrect and that only accounts without purchases were deleted to comply with the General Data Protection Regulation.

== Reception ==
Early reception of Uplay with reviewers and the public had been largely negative, primarily related to the use of DRM. Early games that incorporated Uplay required players to maintain a constant connection to the internet, and if the connection was lost during gameplay, the game would halt, sending users back to their last checkpoint or save depending on the specific game. The scheme quickly came under fire after a denial-of-service attack on Ubisoft's DRM servers in early March 2010 rendered Silent Hunter 5 and Assassin's Creed II unplayable for several days. The always-on requirement was quietly lifted for existing Uplay games towards the end of 2010, being changed to a single validation on game launch. However, the always-on requirement made a return in 2011 with the releases of Driver: San Francisco and From Dust, the latter having been explicitly stated by Ubisoft prior to release to only require a one-time online activation on install. From Dust was later patched to remove the always-on requirement. In September 2012 Ubisoft employees confirmed in an interview that no further Ubisoft games would be using the always-on requirement, instead opting for a one-time activation of the game on install. However The Crew, released in 2014, required the player to be always online in order to play.

John Walker, writing for Rock, Paper, Shotgun, called it a "technical mess" and saying that "it desperately needs to just go away" in the wake of a server collapse around the release of Far Cry 3 that temporarily made the game unplayable. Ars Technica's Kyle Orland says that "Uplay has not exactly endeared itself to the PC gaming community", describing a history of technical errors and problems related to its DRM. Geoffrey Tim, writing for lazygamer.net, called it the "worst thing" about Ubisoft's "otherwise excellent" games, and particularly criticized it for running alongside Steam when Ubisoft games are purchased on that platform. Patrick Klepek, writing for Giant Bomb, criticized the same point, saying that Ubisoft's desire to run its own distribution service offered no real benefit to consumers, and describing the tactics they used to try to get people to use it as irritating and unappealing. Writing a comparison for GadgetReview in which he compared the three major distribution platforms—Uplay, Valve's Steam and Electronic Arts' Origin—Shawn Sanders criticized it for using large amounts of memory while offering fewer features than its competitors. Summarizing popular opinion on the service, VG247's Brenna Hillier said that "Uplay is one of the less popular PC DRM systems, but all your fervent wishing that it would die has not been successful." Joshua Wolens of PC Gamer said that "Have you ever launched a game from Steam, only to watch Origin or UPlay spark to life, and thought "Ah, yes, how pleased I am to see you"? Of course you haven't, unless you own EA or Ubisoft stock. These things don't exist to make games better, they exist to give business liches and C-suite types a little warm glow."

=== Rootkit allegations ===
In July 2012 Tavis Ormandy, an Information Security Engineer at Google, claimed that "Uplay" DRM is a rootkit and poses a serious security risk. The software installs a browser plugin that provides access to the system. Ormandy has written proof-of-concept code for the exploit. The exploit is believed to have been fixed as of version 2.0.4, released on 30 July 2012.

== Ubisoft Club ==
The Ubisoft Club logo

The Ubisoft Club (initially known as Uplay Club) was introduced in October 2015, which transitioned most of the reward system facets of Uplay to this program, as well as adding further ways for players to earn points towards rewards by playing Ubisoft games.

In 2020, it merged into Ubisoft Connect.
