= Shinsekai: Into the Depths =

2019 action-adventure video game

- Developer(s): Capcom
- Publisher(s): Capcom
- Director(s): Shuichi Kawata
- Producer(s): Yoshiaki Hirabayashi; Peter Fabiano
- Designer(s): Koji Wakasono; Kenji Fukasawa; Yusaku Kitagawa
- Programmer(s): Kenichi Saito; Kenji Fukasawa
- Artist(s): Shuichi Kawata
- Composer(s): Chikara Aoshima
- Engine: Unity
- Platform(s): iOS, macOS, Nintendo Switch
- Release: Apple Arcade; September 19, 2019; Nintendo Switch; March 26, 2020
- Genre(s): Action-adventure
- Mode(s): Single-player

Shinsekai: Into the Depths is an action-adventure video game developed and published by Capcom for iOS and macOS through Apple Arcade and the Nintendo Switch.

The Apple Arcade version ceased further downloads on August 15, 2023. It ended service on August 29, 2023, rendering the game unplayable on iOS and macOS devices.

== Gameplay ==
Shinsekai: Into the Depths is a two-dimensional side-scrolling, adventure game taking place in three-dimensional scenes. The player character works his way through a series of underwater environments, each containing a mix of puzzle and combat encounters. To overcome these challenges, the player has access to several tools and mechanics akin to that of a Metroidvania.

== Reception ==
Reception

Aggregate score
Aggregator	Score
Metacritic	iOS: 75/100; NS: 78/100

Review scores
Publication	Score
Destructoid	8/10
Edge	8/10
Jeuxvideo.com	15/20
Nintendo Life	8/10
Nintendo World Report	7.5/10

The iOS version of the game received generally favorable reviews, according to review aggregator Metacritic. According to TechSpot, it was one of Apple Arcade's launch titles and one of the best received games on the platform. According to Destructoid, although the game has faults, they strongly recommend playing it.
