= Jenny LeClue =

2019 video game

Jenny LeClue - Detectivú
- Developer: Mografi
- Publisher: Mografi
- Engine: Unity
- Platforms: iOS, Windows, macOS, Linux, Nintendo Switch, Nintendo Switch 2, PlayStation 4
- Release: iOS, Windows, macOS, Linux; September 19, 2019; Nintendo Switch; August 25, 2020; Nintendo Switch 2; September 7, 2026; PlayStation 4; TBA
- Genre: Adventure

Jenny LeClue - Detectivú is an adventure game developed and published by Mografi. It was released for iOS (as a launch title for Apple Arcade), Microsoft Windows, macOS and Linux in September 2019. The Spoken Secrets Edition added full voice acting as a free update on July 24, 2020. The game was also released for Nintendo Switch on August 25, 2020. It was removed from Apple Arcade in February 2023, but reappeared as a standalone App Store game in August 2024. A PlayStation 4 version was announced to be in development but has yet to be released. A Nintendo Switch 2 version was released on September 7, 2026.

== Gameplay ==
The choices that players make throughout the game have an impact to certain narratives, but not the main story arc. The game contains point-and-click elements, and features a hand-drawn art style. Players are able to interact with certain items in the game, but there is limited clue solving required. During dialogue sections, players can observe the person talking to spot clues as to whether they are lying, but the mechanic is automatic. Locations that players explore include mines, graveyards, mountains, police stations, and libraries.

== Plot ==
Author Arthur K. Finklestein is the creator of the Jenny LeClue series of books, a classic children's sleuth series whose sales are dwindling as readers begin to find the stories trite and boring. His publisher demands a darker, grittier Jenny LeClue book or else the series will be canceled, so Finklestein reluctantly responds by giving Jenny her biggest case yet: the murder of the beloved dean of local Gumboldt College, with her forensic science professor mother as the prime suspect. Within the narrative, Jenny must clear her mom's name and repair her fractured relationship with the dean's son, while Finklestein struggles to commit to putting his beloved Jenny and her town of Arthurton through the wringer in order to keep the series alive.

Jenny LeClue is a highly intelligent young girl who lives in Arthurton with her forensic scientist mother. Her best friend is Keith Strausberry, son of the town's college dean. One day, after solving a few trivial mysteries that includes the likes of figuring out what Dean Strausberry had for breakfast, Jenny complains to Keith about how boring Arthurton is, describing it as stuck in the past. Jenny then goes to the library to look for her mom, who was supposed to meet with Dean Strausberry there earlier. Instead, she finds the Dean dead, clutching onto her mom's ID card. Jenny tries to leave the crime scene though the window to avoid detection, but a hard landing knocks her unconscious.

Jenny's memory of the next few days are a blur. Her mom is now in prison as a suspect for the Dean's murder, Keith is not talking to her, and Jenny herself is now under effective house arrest at the Glatz Manor, home of the wealthy Glatz family, to prevent her from causing more trouble after causing a fiasco at the Dean's funeral. Determined to clear her mom's name and find the Dean's true killer, Jenny tries to escape the bedroom she's locked in, but instead finds a secret lab hidden in the attic above, which belongs to her classmate Suzie Glatz. Having previously written off Suzie as stereotypical cheerleader, Jenny is shocked to discover that Suzie is in fact a prodigy in multiple scientific fields, but keeps this fact a secret from her own family due to familial pressure of keeping up the appearance of a "Glatz Girl". Suzie wants to befriend Jenny by helping her out on her case and gives her a custom walkie talkie to keep contact with her. Jenny is reluctant to befriend Suzie, but accepts the walkie talkie. Suzie helps Jenny escape the manor, and Jenny races back to her house.

Back at her home, now surrounded by police, Jenny sneaks into the basement to look for a spare change of clothes and detective gear. She is shocked to discover that a mysterious man in a trench coat, face completely obscured, is also inside her home looking for something. Jenny stealthily follows him, and eventually deduces that this mysterious man is on a mission to kill her mom. Jenny then pivots her attention towards breaking her mom out of prison to save her. Piecing together a shredded note discarded by the man, Jenny realizes that there is a secret entrance to the abandoned underground mines in the graveyard, which will connect to the sewer system and ultimately, the prison. Jenny calls Suzie for assistance, mostly for the silent explosives Suzie had developed, and races ahead to the graveyard to find the secret entrance. Suzie, however, turns out to be more help than Jenny had bargained for, having extensive maps of the mines, which are owned by her family.

Back in the 'real world', Arthur is struggling with continuing the story in such a dark and violent direction. The player is able to prompt Arthur to reject continuing the plot towards the Graveyard, and decide to force a happy ending instead, in which Jenny and Suzie strain themselves to enjoy a "happy picnic". Arthur ultimately rejects this direction, forcing the story in the direction of resolving Jenny's narrative properly.

Jenny eventually reaches the prison and helps her mom escape by blowing up a hole in the cell floor. Her mom insists that Jenny returns home immediately out of fear for her safety. Jenny demands to know what her mom is up to and the truth behind the Dean's death, but her mom brushes her off and says she has more important things to do right now. Jenny's mom escapes in one direction, and Jenny is forced to leave in the opposite direction after unstable infrastructure from the previous explosion forces Jenny to go back through the mines.

Jenny is eventually cornered by the mysterious man near the graveyard entrance. Suzie and Keith intervene and rescue Jenny. As Jenny recounts her adventure to them, she suddenly has an epiphany. She asks Suzie and Keith to distract the police while Jenny races back to the grave site of where the Dean was buried.

Jenny finds her Mom at the grave site reviving the Dean with an antidote, as the Dean had never actually died, but rather staged his death with a special poison, and planned this whole ordeal with Jenny's mom. Throughout her excursion, Jenny had been uncovering evidence of a massive secret research project in Arthurton, one that caused the alleged death of her dad, as well as a tragedy in which 300 miners were killed. Jenny's epiphany was that this side case was in fact directly tied to the Dean's staged murder. The Dean chose to disappear from the public eye in order to help Jenny's mom take down the shadowy organization responsible for sponsoring this secret project, which they had deemed an existential threat to their town. While exploring, Jenny had discovered that Arthurton had "disappeared" from the world, and is currently on the "other side". Jenny's father had somehow gone back to the original side that Arthurton had originated from, and is actually alive.

Meanwhile, back in the 'real world', Arthur is pleased to have written a gritty murder mystery story without having to permanently kill any character off. However, his publisher says that it feels like a trick, and that it has broken the promise that Arthur had made. Arthur, realizing that his series's only chance at survival demands on him killing off one of the main characters, decides to pick one at random with his hand over his eyes; he selects either Jenny, Jenny's Mom, or the Dean, to kill off for good.

Jenny insists that her dad is still alive and on the 'other side', but before the three of them could decide what to do next, a seismic event interrupts them, erasing the character that Arthur has picked to kill off, and the story ends on a cliffhanger.

== Development ==
The game was launched through a successful crowdfunding campaign on Kickstarter. With a goal of $65,000, it reached $105,797 from 3,969 backers by August 2014. It was released for iOS, Microsoft Windows, macOS, and Linux on September 19, 2019, and for Nintendo Switch on August 25, 2020. A version for PlayStation 4 was also announced. The iOS version was released through the Apple Arcade service.

=== Future ===
In May 2022, Mografi announced on social media that a sequel to Jenny LeClue was in development.
