= Roundguard =

2020 video game

- Developer: Wonderbelly Games
- Publisher: The Quantum Astrophysicists Guild
- Engine: Unity
- Platforms: iOS, Nintendo Switch, Windows, Xbox One, PlayStation 4, Android
- Release: iOS, Switch, Windows, Xbox One; March 13, 2020; PS4; March 17, 2020; Android; April 24, 2023
- Genre: Roguelike
- Mode: Single-player

Roundguard is a roguelike video game developed by Wonderbelly Games and published by The Quantum Astrophysicists Guild. The game was released in March 2020 for iOS through Apple Arcade, Nintendo Switch, Windows, Xbox One, and PlayStation 4, later releasing for Android in 2023. The game is set inside of a play, in which a castle is under attack. It was originally created with a Puzzle Quest-like structure before being turned into a roguelike.

The game received generally favorable reviews from critics, with praise for its roguelike elements and dialogue. Roundguard received several content updates after its release.

== Gameplay ==
A boss level in Roundguard

Roundguard is a roguelike that takes place inside a play, in which a castle is under attack. The player can choose between three characters, who have different characteristics and abilities. Dungeons are procedurally generated, and every enemy in a dungeon has to be defeated to progress. Clearing a level earns the player a weapon, armor, abilities, and gold, which can be used to make their character stronger. The player can either equip it, and lose their held item, or sell it for extra gold. Runes can be obtained, which affect the difficulty of a run. A run lasts three acts. Near the end of an act, the player will face a boss. A run ends when the character's health points reaches zero.

== Development and release ==
Roundguard was developed in Unity by the Seattle-based Wonderbelly Games, consisting of Andrea Roberts, Bob Roberts, and Kurt Loidl. They worked with The Quantum Astrophysicists Guild to port the game to Apple platforms and consoles. Andrea stated that it started from a brainstorm. They liked to play with physics, and started writing pages of their ideas. She remembered saying "Peggle RPG", then the group made the foundations for Roundguard. The original concept was structured like Puzzle Quest and Grindstone, with set challenges throughout a campaign, but transitioned to a roguelike with randomized dungeons. After around three months of work, they brought their first playable prototype to a Seattle show and tell.

In 2019, the game was displayed at the PAX West Indie Megabooth and MomoCon's indie showcase. Roundguard was released for iOS through Apple Arcade, Nintendo Switch, Windows, and Xbox One on March 13, 2020. A PlayStation 4 version was released on March 17. Roundguard received its first content update, the "Treasure Update" in July. The next update, the "Gift Giver" update, was released in December. The "Druid Update" added a new character, Sprig, in July 2021. In May 2022, the "Encore" update was released, adding two modes to the game. Wonderbelly announced that Roundguard would leave Apple Arcade and relaunch on Android and iOS on April 24, 2023.

== Reception ==
Reception

Aggregate scores
Aggregator	Score
Metacritic	IOS: 86/100 (Note: Score based on 4 reviews); NS: 79/100 (Note: Score based on 5 reviews); XONE: 80/100 (Note: Score based on 5 reviews)
OpenCritic	75% recommend

Review scores
Publication	Score
Game Informer	8/10
Nintendo World Report	8/10
Pocket Gamer	4/5
Push Square	7/10
TouchArcade	4.5/5

Roundguard received "generally favorable reviews", according to review aggregator website Metacritic. Fellow review aggregator OpenCritic assessed that the game received strong approval, being recommended by 75% of critics.

Game Informer's Matt Miller wrote that inclusion of roguelike elements made Roundguard "rewarding", and gave it its own identity. Miller felt that it became easy for the choice of class to become "stale" without a larger selection of heroes. He expresses his frustration toward the challenge of making an optimized build.

Stephen Tailby of Push Square praised the execution, presentation, and gameplay. iMore recommended Roundguard as a "must" for those who enjoyed Peggle. Pocket Gamer's Will Quick wrote that the roguelike and puzzle mechanics were combined in "fun, interesting, and challenging ways". However he believed it could be "difficult and unforgiving" at times.

TouchArcade's Sergio Velasquez wrote that the music was "good", but wasn't as "great" as the art style. He commended the character design, dialogue, and gameplay. Writing for Nintendo World Report, Bryan Rose wrote that the game was a "well-executed" idea, complimenting the dungeon crawling and "witty" dialogue. Rose felt that the graphics and audio were fine, but mundane, concluding that the gameplay was Roundguard's "strongest suit".
