= Stitch up =

Stitch up may refer to:

- Stitch Up!, a British children's TV show
- Stitch up, or frameup, to falsely implicate someone
- Stitch up, to close by sewing

== See also ==
- Stitch (disambiguation)
