= Impossible Road =

2013 video game

- App icon
- Developer: Wonderful Lasers
- Publisher: Wonderful Lasers
- Director: Kevin Ng
- Engine: Unity
- Platforms: iOS, Android
- Release: iOS; May 9, 2013; Android; April 8, 2014
- Genre: Action
- Mode: Single-player

Impossible Road is a 2013 action video game developed and published by the Canadian indie studio Wonderful Lasers. It was released for iOS in 2013, and later for Android. A follow-up published by Rogue Games, Super Impossible Road, was released for Windows on May 11, 2016, as one of the launch titles for Apple Arcade on September 19, 2019, for Nintendo Switch on December 9, 2021, and for PlayStation 4, PlayStation 5, Xbox One, and Xbox Series X/S on June 8, 2022. A true sequel, Impossible Road 2, was announced to be in development for Windows in December 2023.

== Gameplay ==
In Impossible Road, the player controls a ball through an endless road.

The player is tasked with keeping a white ball (called "The Vessel") on the road for as long as possible without falling off. The road has procedurally generated twists, turns and dives and is endless. The player controls the ball by tapping (with two fingers) left or right on the screen. Each time the player passes a numbered checkpoint line, the player gains a point (several if they missed some checkpoints in between). The player can "cheat" and fall off the road and land on a road section further on the road. When the player dies (after several seconds of free fall), the player is presented with the option to play again. The player can see how many checkpoint lines they crossed and how many they skipped.

A later update allowed the player to select a color scheme (theme) and have more accurate 3D Touch controls.

== Development and release ==
Impossible Road was developed entirely by the Canadian indie developer Kevin Ng, who had previous experience at Rockstar Games and Electronic Arts. The developer drew his inspiration mainly from Stunt Car Racer, a racing game of his childhood that featured tracks similar to this game's "roller coaster"-like ones, and was also influenced by Super Hexagon, the Rainbow Road, courses of the Mario Kart series, Wipeout, and Super Monkey Ball. Ng appreciated the minimalist aspect found in some games and chose that for his because it "strips everything down and lets you get to the important stuff. It keeps you honest as a designer". Thinking minimally thus became his challenge, and during development, he decided in favor of the blue-and-white graphics with the ball taking up negative space and against adding power-ups. He also opposed and resisted monetizing the game via microtransactions. The "cheating" mechanic was implemented when he tested a working prototype of the game and found that jumping off and on the track was too enjoyable to penalize. The game was released for iOS on May 9, 2013, and it was made available for Android on April 8, 2014.

== Reception ==
Reception

Aggregate score
Aggregator	Score
Metacritic	75/100

Review scores
Publication	Score
Edge	9/10
Eurogamer	7/10
Gamezebo	3.5/5
GameZone	Recommended
IGN	8.4/10
Pocket Gamer	4/5
TouchArcade	4.5/5
Paste	8/10

On Metacritic, the game received "generally favorable" reviews based on 15 critics. TouchArcade gave the game 4.5 stars out of 5 stars praising the game's music and minimalism.

Several reviewers also compared the game to Super Hexagon and Rainbow Road from the Mario Kart series. Impossible Road was a runner-up for the British Academy Scotland Award of 2013 in the games category. It was also a runner-up for Apple's award for the iPad game of the year in 2013, which was won by Frogmind's Badland.
