= Outlanders (video game) =

2019 city-building game

- Developer: Pomelo Games
- Publisher: Pomelo Games
- Engine: Unity
- Platforms: iOS; macOS; tvOS; Windows
- Release: iOS, tvOS, macOS; WW: September 19, 2019; Windows; WW: March 7, 2023
- Genre: City-building
- Mode: Single-player

Outlanders is a city-building video game developed by Pomelo Games. It focuses on small-scale management of a settlement. It was released for iOS, macOS, and tvOS through Apple Arcade in 2019 and Windows in 2023. A sequel titled Outlanders 2: Second Nature was released on Apple Arcade in July 2024 for iOS, macOS and tvOS.

== Gameplay ==
Players manage a small settlement. They are given various tasks to complete in scenarios, which can involve resource management or elements of construction and management simulations. Settlers are autonomous but can be assigned to jobs. They can die of old age or if players mismanage the settlement, such as running out of food. Players can control settler behavior through decrees, though this usually decreases happiness.

== Development ==
Pomelo Games, an Uruguayan studio, developed Outlanders for Apple Arcade. The primary motivation for this was to avoid having to find a way to monetize the game. The iOS version was released on September 19, 2019, and it was ported to Windows on March 7, 2023.

== Reception ==
Pocket Gamer identified as one of the best games on Apple Arcade and recommended it to players who want a relaxing city-building game. Game Informer recommended the Windows port over the iOS version for its better user interface. The reviewer called it "an immensely satisfying experience" and said the scenarios are difficult but fair. Rock Paper Shotgun said that it is as charming and relaxing as it promises but that it also has a surprising amount of humor, which they praised. Macwelt recommended it to fans of real-time strategy games who want something that plays similarly but is more relaxing.

Outlanders was nominated for best video game in the 2019 International Mobile Gaming Awards.
