= Xbox Game Pass =

Video game subscription service by Microsoft

- Developer: Xbox (Microsoft)
- Type: Video game subscription service
- Launched: June 1, 2017; 9 years ago
- Platforms: Xbox One; Xbox Series X/S; Xbox Cloud Gaming; Steam Deck; Meta Quest; Fire TV; Samsung Smart TVs; LG Smart TVs
- Operating systems: Android; iOS; iPadOS; Windows; macOS; ChromeOS
- Status: Active
- Members: ▼30 million (as of July 2026)
- Pricing model: $13.99/month for PC Game Pass; $9.99/month for Xbox Game Pass Essential; $14.99/month for Xbox Game Pass Premium; $22.99/month for Xbox Game Pass Ultimate
- Website: xbox.com/xbox-game-pass

Xbox Game Pass is a subscription service offered by Xbox as part of its ecosystem. Launched on June 1, 2017, the service allows users to download and play video games via video game consoles, Microsoft Windows, Android, iOS, iPadOS, web browsers, smart televisions, and cloud. Game Pass contains a rotating library of games, with the games remaining accessible as long as the user has an active subscription. Game Pass subscribers also receive discounts on purchases of games from the service's library and their respective downloadable content (DLC).

The service consists of two products; the main Xbox Game Pass for the Xbox One and Series X/S, and PC Game Pass for PCs running under Microsoft's Windows brand exclusive to Windows 10 and Windows 11. Xbox Game Pass and PC Game Pass are available as separate subscription products. A premium tier known as Game Pass Ultimate includes access to both services, in addition to Xbox Cloud Gaming, an on-demand cloud gaming available on console, PC, and mobile platforms, and Xbox Game Pass Essential subscription benefits.

The service features titles from Xbox subsidiaries Xbox Game Studios, Bethesda Softworks and Activision Blizzard, as well as other companies. Since January 2018, all new Xbox Game Studios titles have been available to Game Pass subscribers immediately upon their release. Microsoft has also offered access to Electronic Arts's EA Play service, Ubisoft's Ubisoft+ and Riot Games special bonus rewards for PC Game Pass and Game Pass Ultimate subscribers.

Xbox Live Gold was discontinued on September 14, 2023, with the service being merged into Xbox Game Pass as a new low price tier, Xbox Game Pass Core, which offers a limited set of free titles to subscribers.

== History ==
=== Launch and expansion (2017-2023) ===

Xbox Game Pass and PC Game Pass logos

Conception of what would become Game Pass came from two areas. First was with Phil Spencer, who became head of the Xbox brand following the troubled launch of the Xbox One in 2013. Spencer, seeking to improve the brand's image, reinvigorated the Xbox team with new ideas for this, even if his ideas were risky. One of the ideas generated during this time was a game rental service, and a project to establish this service was started under the code name Arches. As Microsoft progressed, online streaming services like Netflix and Spotify demonstrated successful subscription business models that led Microsoft to transition Arches to also follow a subscription model eventually into Game Pass. The concept of Game Pass fit into the larger corporate strategy of Microsoft to push cloud-based services under CEO Satya Nadella.

The second area involved Rare, a game developer that Microsoft had acquired in 2002. Rare created Sea of Thieves, which grew out from multiplayer ideas they had proposed while developing Kinect Sports for the Xbox One. Sea of Thieves was intended as a major test of demonstrating how well Game Pass would be adopted by players and the economics of the system. Spencer knew there was strong hesitation from other game publishers and developers on the subscription model, so he made plans to have Game Pass launch using a catalog of older titles, and then bring on Sea of Thieves as Microsoft's first first-party game for the service, on the same day that it would also be available at retail or purchasable through digital storefronts. Spencer had told Duncan that even if every player of Sea of Thieves played it through Game Pass and that no retail or downloadable copies were bought, Spencer would still consider that a successful result.

On February 28, 2017, Microsoft announced the debut of Xbox Game Pass and made a limited catalog of games available to select members of its Xbox Insider community for testing and feedback. Later in the second quarter of 2017, the service was opened up to players who subscribe to Xbox Live Gold, and then to the general user population. An Xbox Live Gold subscription is not required for Xbox Game Pass, but it is required for any online multiplayer content the games in the catalog may contain.

As part of Microsoft's E3 2017 press conference, Microsoft announced that selected Xbox titles would be made available through a new backwards-compatibility feature similar to that in place for Xbox 360 titles. In a later interview, Spencer stated that some of those games could make their way onto Game Pass, as well.

On January 23, 2018, Microsoft announced an expansion of Game Pass that would see first-party titles arrive on the catalog day-and-date with the retail release of the game, starting with the aforementioned Sea of Thieves launched on March 20, 2018. Crackdown 3, State of Decay 2 and Forza Horizon 4 would also be added upon launch, although their launch dates were not announced at the time, and future releases in existing Microsoft franchises, such as Halo and Gears of War, would also be added upon their release. Additionally, select ID@Xbox titles are also added to the service on their release dates, the first being Robocraft Infinity.

Spencer has stated that Microsoft's intent with Xbox Game Pass is to make it available across many devices, including those of their competitors. Spencer stated "We want to bring Game Pass to any device that somebody wants to play on...Not just because it's our business, but really because the business model allows for people to consume and find games that they wouldn't have played in any other space."

On April 18, 2019, Microsoft announced Xbox Game Pass Ultimate, a new tier that combines both Game Pass and Xbox Live Gold into a single subscription package. It became available for testing to Xbox Insiders that same day, while general availability began on June 9, 2019. In May 2019, Microsoft announced Game Pass for PC, which would be supported on Windows 10 and have over 100 games available at launch. On June 9, 2019, Microsoft announced that Game Pass for PC would launch in open beta, and this would also be included in Ultimate.

Spencer said in October 2020 that their current pricing model for Game Pass at this point was considered "completely sustainable" despite concerns from some developers that they were undercharging for it, and that Microsoft had no plans to raise the price in the near future.

In June 2021, Microsoft stated that it was working on a Game Pass app for smart TVs, as well as a "standalone streaming device". Both of these offerings would be built around xCloud. In December 2021, Microsoft announced the rebranding of Xbox Game Pass for PC as "PC Game Pass" to reduce market confusion. The service continues to be branded with the Xbox logo.

A Friends and Family tier was revealed in September 2022, with trials first released in Ireland and Colombia. The higher priced plan, estimated to be $25/month, allows one to share their account with up to four others, limited to those within the same country as the account holder.

Since launch, Microsoft had offered an introductory $1/mo rate for new subscribers to Xbox Game Pass Ultimate. Microsoft announced it was discontinuing this promotion in March 2023 and was looking for potential replacement options to draw in new subscribers.

=== Integration following Activision-Blizzard merge (2023-2025) ===
Ahead of completing its acquisition of Activision-Blizzard in October 2023, Microsoft replaced Xbox Live Gold with a new Xbox Game Pass tier, called Xbox Game Pass Core, on September 14, 2023. Core carries the same features as Xbox Live Gold (including online multiplayer for non-free-to-play games), and offers a library of 36 games at launch, which is expected to expand and change over time, similar to the main Game Pass library.

While Spencer described how Microsoft would be making select Xbox exclusives available on PlayStation 5 and Nintendo Switch in February 2024, he stated there were no plans to bringing Game Pass to these platforms, instead remaining the place where they would offer their first-party games first for Xbox and Windows.

A number of pricing changes and tier offerings were made as of September 12, 2024. New users are no longer be able to buy into the console-only tier digitally, though existing users will remain on this plan for at least a year before migration. Instead, a new Standard tier, offering Xbox Live services and access to the game library, excluding day one releases, has been introduced. Other plans remain the same including day-one access but will see their price increased by $2-3 per month, ahead of the availability of Call of Duty: Black Ops 6 as a day-one title on the service.

Microsoft unveiled a revamped Xbox Game Pass tier structure on October 1, 2025, with the service offering three tiers, Essential (A renaming of Core), Premium (A renaming of Standard), and Ultimate. The Ultimate tier will include Ubisoft+ Classics and Fortnite Crew. The change was also made alongside Xbox Cloud Gaming leaving its beta period, available to both Premium and Ultimate subscribers, the latter with faster streaming options for Cloud Gaming. Day-one releases are limited to Ultimate tier users, but Microsoft increased the number of games available across all tiers, with 50 for Essential, 200 for Premium, and 400 for Ultimate. The prices were also increased across tiers, with Ultimate raised to $30 per month. The PC Game Pass also saw an increase in price along with similar additional features. Microsoft said that they justified the price increases by the addition of more games from additional partners and new service offerings. The price increase, alongside increases in the Xbox console prices in 2025, was met with criticism from players, with many calling for others to cancel their subscriptions. In a 2026 interview, Xbox chief strategy officer Matthew Ball said that Game Pass shed "millions of subscribers" in a few months following this price hike.

=== Changes from the Xbox reset (2026-) ===
Asha Sharma replaced Spencer as head of the Microsoft Gaming division in February 2026. Numerous corporate changes were made, including rebranding Microsoft Gaming as simply Xbox. Over the next several months, several other major shifts were announced, including keeping first party, single-player games as exclusive to Xbox consoles and Windows, cutting several studios from Xbox Game Studios, and laying off 3200 staff.

Many of these changes were a result of underperformance of Xbox Game Pass. Microsoft had expected the service to reach 74 million subscribers with the addition of Activision-Blizzard games by 2026, but only reached an estimated 30 million. The October 2024 price increase was one contributing factor. Another was making available major titles available on day one on the service which hurt sales while diminished the value brought by other games. Employees speaking to Bloomberg News said that while the service may have been fashioned on the successful Netflix model with consumers viewing a wide range of content, the average gamers did not vary in their choice, often staying to one or two preferred games.

These changes were reflected in Xbox Game Pass. Microsoft announced a price reduction of Game Pass Ultimate and PC Game Pass on April 21, 2026, along with the removal of day one availability of future Call of Duty titles. Future titles would now be added to the service the following holiday season after release, about a year later.

Starting in November 2026, access to Xbox Cloud Gaming will become limited across all Xbox Game Pass tiers, ranging from 5 to 15 hours a month, though users can pay for additional hours beyond that allocation. Microsoft said this change was needed to address the rising costs of closed gaming.

In a Fortune interview in October 2026, Sharma suggested that Microsoft may move Xbox Game Pass to an a la carte model, where subscribers select packages of services they want.

== Features ==
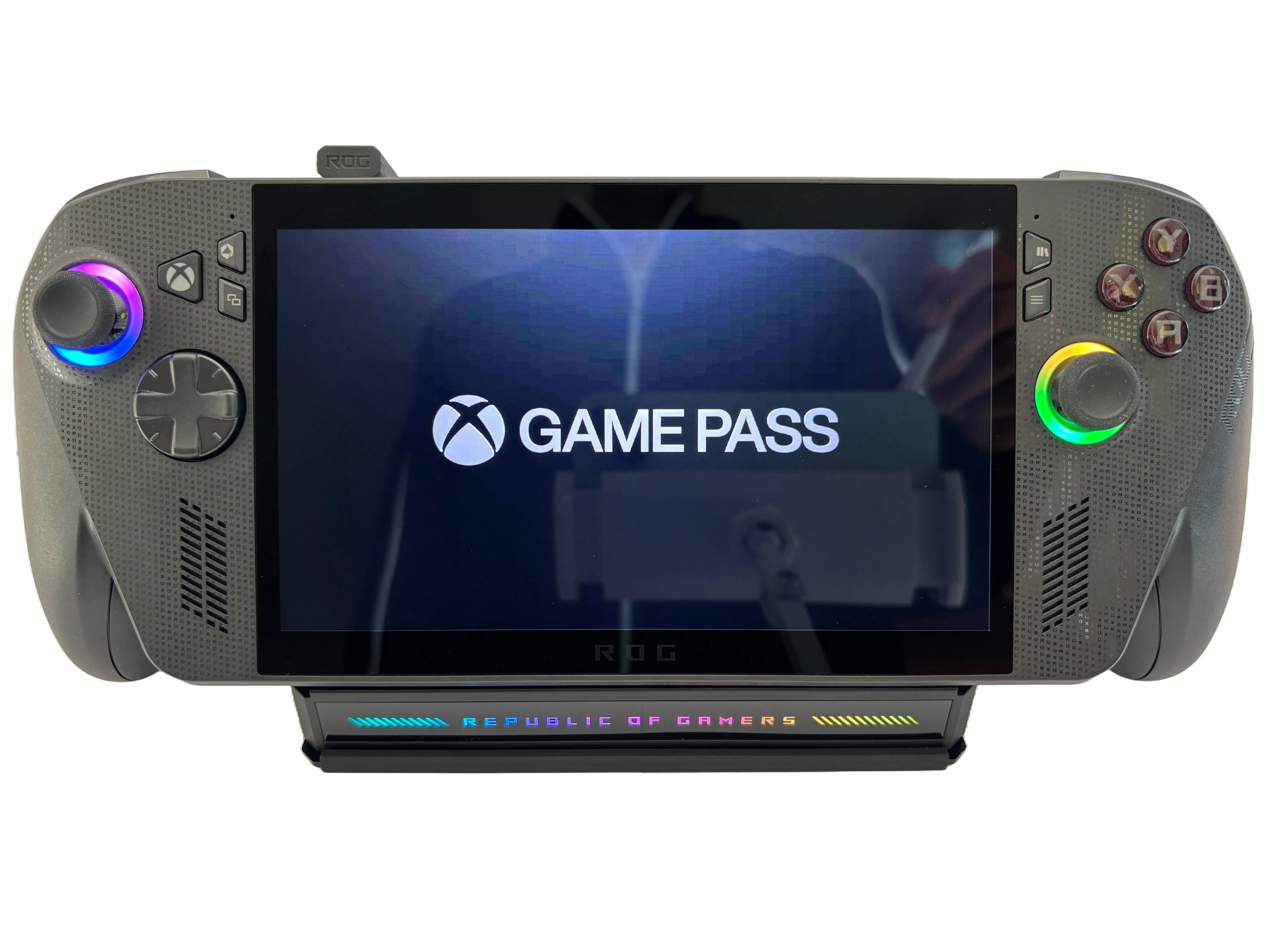
Game Pass on the ROG Xbox Ally X

Xbox Game Pass is similar to Xbox One's existing EA Play video game subscription and to the PlayStation Now service offered by rival Sony. The subscription catalog contained more than 100 games at launch, with games being added to, and sometimes withdrawn from, the catalog from time to time. Xbox Game Pass allows the player to download the full game to the console; according to Head of Xbox Phil Spencer, this was done to give players "continuous, full-fidelity gameplay without having to worry about streaming, bandwidth or connectivity issues". Unlike EA Play, Xbox Game Pass offers games from a wide range of publishers, such as Bandai Namco Entertainment, Capcom, Warner Bros. Games, 2K, and first-party games from Xbox Game Studios. According to Spencer, Microsoft sees the Game Pass as more of a platform to offer games that do not fit the common mold that sell well and would be difficult to gain a publisher, and instead to allow these games to be offered in the subscription model, encouraging both developers to create new and experimental titles. The Game Pass also provides a way for players to try games they would not normally have purchased.

The catalog features select games for Xbox Series X/S and Xbox One as well as select Xbox 360 and Xbox titles with which Xbox Series X|S and Xbox One are backwards-compatible. There is no limit to the number of games a player can download and install to their consoles, other than the amount of storage space available to the console. As long as a game remains in the catalog, it is available for unlimited download and play by subscribers. Players can purchase games in the catalog at a 20% discount, and any related add-on content for those games at a 10% discount. The discounted price is available only while the game is in the catalog and is only for the particular game. Games from the catalog can be played while the console is offline, but for no more than 30 days before it must reconnect to verify an active subscription.

If the game is removed from the catalog or the player ends their subscription, access is suspended until the player purchases the game or renews their subscription, but their in-game progress will be saved in the interim. If the game is an Xbox 360 title, it will be backward-compatible and must be used on Xbox Series X|S or Xbox One; it cannot be downloaded to a player's Xbox 360 console unless the player chooses to purchase it.

Spencer has stated that Microsoft has multiple ways to compensate developers for games on Game Pass and there is no one single payback approach. The payback scheme ranges from a flat rate approach as to assure exclusivity on the Microsoft platform, to completely covering the costs of development, and includes various models based on usage and monetization approaches. Paradox Interactive's Fredrik Wester stated the terms they have had followed the Netflix model where the developer or publisher was paid a lump sum by Microsoft for their game on the service for a fixed period of time based on a perceived value, rather than the per-play royalty-based approach used by services like Spotify. The upfront approach, along with the large subscriber numbers, allows developers to select ongoing directions for their games. In the case of Obsidian Entertainment, they were able to consider additional downloadable content for their game Outer Worlds as they knew millions were playing it.

In a July 2020 interview, Xbox's marketing director Aaron Greenberg said that Xbox Game Pass is not necessarily meant to be profitable for Microsoft at the current time but is designed to help draw more players to use it through word-of-mouth by offering a large set of features as a seemingly under priced value, and in the long-term become valuable. This allows them to avoid high costs of advertising the service. As part of a published report as part of Microsoft's proposed acquisition of Activision-Blizzard in 2022, the UK's Competition and Markets Authority reported that Game Pass did cannibalize sales of games for around the first year they are present on the service. Spencer acknowledged the report, but stated the "you instantly have more players of the game, which is actually leading to more sales of the game".

While there had been rumors that Microsoft was working to bring Xbox Game Pass to other console platforms like the PlayStation or Nintendo Switch, Spencer said in an August 2021 interview that there are currently no plans for these consoles. Spencer said "We have no plans to bring [the full Xbox experience] to any other kind of closed platforms right now, mainly because those closed platforms don't want something like Game Pass" and that their focus was on making it available to open systems like personal computers and web applications.

=== Additional partnerships ===
Xbox Cloud Gaming (codenamed "xCloud") launched for Game Pass Ultimate subscribers on September 15, 2020, which adds the ability for cloud gaming to select Android mobile devices, with initially over 100 games optimized for the services. Support for additional Android mobile devices are expected later. Alongside the release of Xbox Series X and Series S, EA Play was added to Game Pass Ultimate subscribers on console and Xbox Cloud Gaming on November 10, 2020, before expanding to PC for Game Pass Ultimate and Game Pass for PC subscribers on March 18, 2021. A web application for Xbox Cloud Gaming entered an invite-only beta in April 2021, and became generally available in June 2021; it is compatible with PC and mobile web browsers (including, in particular, iOS devices, as restrictions enforced by Apple that inhibit the ability to offer cloud gaming services on the platform). Xbox Cloud Gaming was expanded to include all Game Pass tiers in August 2025.

Riot Games, which has traditionally offered its games through its own launcher, announced in June 2022 that they will be adding their free-to-play games including League of Legends to Xbox Game Pass later in 2022. For games like League of Legends, the full roster of champions or heroes will be available to Game Pass subscribers, while for other titles like Legends of Runeterra, subscribers to Game Pass will receive in-game rewards.

Xbox partnered with Antstream in May 2025 to make numerous licensed retro games available through Antstream Arcade as part of the Game Pass subscription with the creation of Xbox Retro Classics

Xbox announced a new tier of Xbox Game Pass was added to Discord Nitro. Titled "Starter Edition", it includes a limited library of over 50 games from the standard subscription, as well 10 hours of Xbox Cloud Gaming access each month. Xbox also announced perks from Discord Nitro for Xbox Game Pass subscribers, with 250 Discord Orbs each month, 1.2x extra Orbs when completing Discord Quests, and automatically applied Discord Shop discounts being included; this was announced on May 11, 2026.

== Subscribers ==
In the Q3 2020 earnings call in April 2020, Microsoft reported that there were over 10 million Xbox Game Pass subscribers. By September 2020, it had reached 15 million subscribers, 18 million by January 2021, and over 25 million by January 2022. It reached 25 million subscribers by January 2022.

According to documents related to the Activision Blizzard acquisition, Game Pass had total revenues of $2.9 billion in the fiscal year ending January 2021, which was about 30% of Microsoft's games and services revenues, or 18% of its total Xbox business.

In February 2024, Microsoft announced there were 34 million Game Pass subscribers. Documents from the legal challenges to the Microsoft-Activision merger had stated that Microsoft expected Xbox Game Pass to grow to around 77 million subscribers by 2026 with the inclusion of Activision games on the service, but analyst estimates of subscriber count in July 2026 remained around 30 million.

== Availability ==
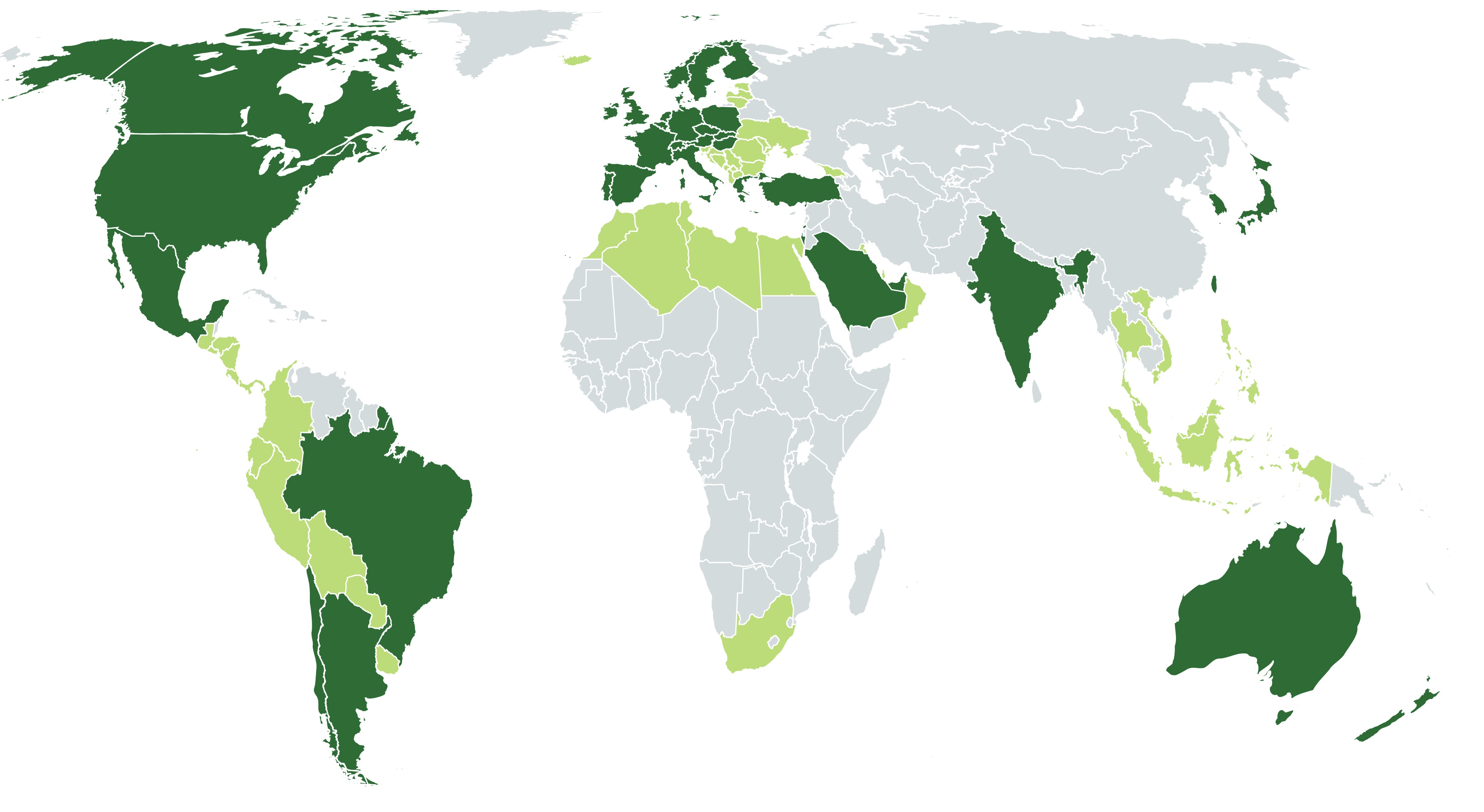
Xbox Game Pass availability by country: Console and PC Only PC

Xbox Game Pass is available in Argentina, Australia, Austria, Belgium, Brazil, Canada, Chile, Colombia, Czech Republic, Denmark, Finland, France, Germany, Greece, Hong Kong, Hungary, India, Ireland, Israel, Italy, Japan, Mexico, the Netherlands, New Zealand, Norway, Poland, Portugal, Russia, Saudi Arabia, Singapore, Slovakia, South Africa, South Korea, Spain, Sweden, Switzerland, Taiwan, Turkey, the United Arab Emirates, the United Kingdom, and the United States.

On March 29, 2022, the PC Game Pass Preview launched in five more Southeast Asian countries (the first one was Singapore), including Indonesia, Malaysia, Philippines, Thailand, and Vietnam. The service has been officially launched in these countries on April 21, 2022.

The PC Game Pass service has also expanded to several European, North Africa, and Middle East countries through a preview that started on February 28, 2023.

A portion of the PC Game Pass catalog will be available to the GeForce Now streaming service later in 2023.

== Reception ==
In the early 2020s, Game Pass received praise from several indie game developers for its financial support and broad reach. Davionne Gooden, the solo developer of She Dreams Elsewhere, accepted a deal to launch the game on Game Pass on its release day in exchange for financial compensation. He stated that the agreement "allowed [him] to fund the rest of the game, make it profitable, and still do everything [he] wanted to do with a publisher, without having to get a publisher." Josh Sawyer of Obsidian Entertainment credited Game Pass as a key factor in the development of Pentiment, noting in an interview that he did not believe that he could have found a publisher for the game. Similarly, Gregorios Kythreotis, creative director of Sable, mentioned that the Game Pass deal provided his team with financial security to invest more time in the project and expand their team through additional hires. Cheesemaster Games, the developer of Spirittea, was able to spend another year on the development of the game due to the support from Game Pass. Mike Rose, founder of the publisher No More Robots, reported that the inclusion of Descenders in the Game Pass library led to a significant increase in sales.

=== Criticism ===
By the mid-2020s, Game Pass began facing increased criticism from indie developers and journalists. Casey Yano, co-founder of Mega Crit (the studio behind Slay the Spire), stated that Game Pass deals "are no longer what they once were", noting that some indie developers had experienced funding cancellations. Chris Bourassa, director of Darkest Dungeon, echoed this sentiment, drawing parallels with the evolution of Epic Store exclusivity deals. In a post on Twitter, Raphaël Colantonio, co-founder of Arkane Studios, described Game Pass as "an unsustainable model that has been increasingly damaging the industry for a decade, subsidized by [Microsoft's] 'infinite money'". He further suggested that Game Pass cannot "co-exist with other models, they'll either kill everyone else, or give up". Patricia Hernandez, writing for Polygon, compared Game Pass to technology companies such as Uber, Netflix or Spotify, suggesting that it may rely on predatory pricing strategies aimed at establishing a monopoly.

Game Pass has been criticized for harming traditional game sales, thus hurting revenue for developers. Microsoft estimated that Call of Duty: Black Ops 6 being available on Game Pass at launch lead to $300 million in lost sales compared to 2023's title which was not available on Game Pass at launch. 82% of the Black Ops 6's full price sales came from PlayStation 5 which does not have Game Pass. Kotaku estimated that Microsoft would have needed 15 million new subscriptions to Game Pass Ultimate for one month in order to make up for reduced sales revenue. Journalist Christopher Dring of The Game Business estimated that "games that are in Game Pass can expect to lose around 80% of its expected premium sales on Xbox", including first party titles such as Senua's Saga: Hellblade II, Indiana Jones and the Great Circle and Starfield.

== See also ==
- Apple Arcade
- Google Play Pass
- GameClub
