= Stitch (video game) =

2022 video game

stitch.
- Developer: Lykke Studios
- Publisher: Lykkegaard Europe Ltd.
- Producer: Jakob Lykkegaard
- Designer: Jakob Lykkegaard
- Programmer: Lykke Studios Team
- Artist: Lykke Studios Art Team
- Engine: Unity
- Platforms: iOS; iPadOS; macOS; tvOS; visionOS; Nintendo Switch
- Release: 28 October 2022 (Apple Arcade); 7 April 2024 (Nintendo Switch)
- Genre: Puzzle
- Mode: Single-player

Stitch (stylized as stitch.) is a casual puzzle video game developed by Lykke Studios and published by Lykkegaard Europe Ltd. The game features embroidery-inspired grid puzzles where players must fill numbered areas to complete stitched patterns. It was released for Apple Arcade on 28 October 2022 and later ported to the Nintendo Switch on 17 April 2024.

The game received critical acclaim for its accessibility and design, winning an Apple Design Award for Inclusivity in 2023.

== Development and release ==
Stitch was developed using the Unity engine by the Copenhagen-based studio Lykke Studios. It launched on Apple Arcade on 28 October 2022 across iOS, iPadOS, macOS, and tvOS.

Following the release of the Apple Vision Pro, the game was updated to support visionOS, allowing for spatial gaming experiences. A version for the Nintendo Switch was released on 17 April 2024, featuring touch screen support and controller optimization.

== Reception ==
Reception

Review scores
Publication	Score
MeriStation	7/10 (NS)
Common Sense Media	4/5
Multiplayer.it	8.0/10 (iPad)

=== Awards ===
Year	Award	Category	Result	Ref.
2023	Apple Design Awards	Inclusivity	Won	
