= GameClub =

Mobile video game subscription service

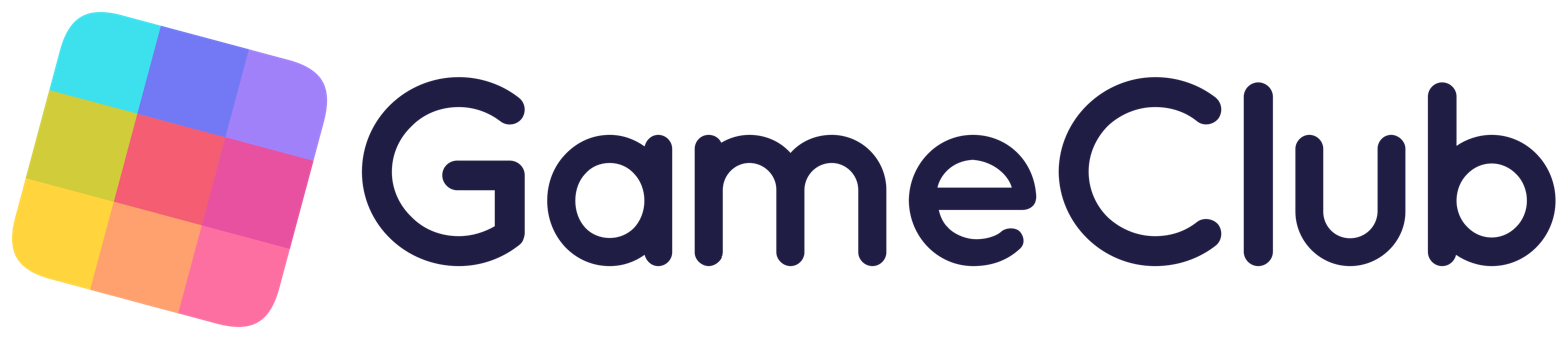

- GameClub app running on an iPhone XR
- Developer: GameClub Inc.
- Key people: Dan Sherman, Oliver Pedersen, Britt Myers, Eli Hodapp
- Type: Subscription gaming service
- Launched: October 25, 2019
- Operating systems: iOS, Android
- Status: Defunct
- Pricing model: US$4.99 per month
- Website: Official website

GameClub was a video game subscription service for iOS and Android devices that was launched in 2019. The service primarily offered games that were previously delisted from app stores or are no longer actively maintained by their original developers, updated to support newer devices and software. It also expanded to releasing mobile ports of games available for PC and console. The company is owned by Take-Two Interactive since 2023.

== History ==
GameClub was first revealed on March 5, 2019, with an early access program starting shortly after on March 12, 2019. During this period, game betas would be distributed weekly through TestFlight.

GameClub officially launched on October 25, 2019 for iOS users, alongside a standalone GameClub application, which acted as a hub for the catalogue of titles available and provides details about each game. The following week, Minigore was revealed to be the first game available through the service to be updated with MFi controller support.

The service launched for Android on June 18, 2020, although with a smaller selection of initial games. Cross-platform play between Android and iOS was also introduced to the service, starting with title Neon Shadow.

On September 5, 2020, GameClub revealed they would soon be releasing mobile ports of PC and console games for the first time, as well as adding expansions to pre-existing titles.

Challenges, an achievement-like feature, was revealed on October 8, 2020. Six initial games were updated to support the feature on the same day, with more titles planned. A redesigned GameClub app and dashboard were released at the same time, including challenges support and a search function.

Leagues were revealed on December 5, 2020. The tiered leaderboard system encourages players to beat other's scores in order to reach higher ranks or to prevent falling into a lower one at the end of a week. An initial eight games were updated to support the feature.

On January 5, 2021, the GameClub app was updated to include a profile feature, allowing users to add friends and view player activity. The friends system was planned to be integrated into multiplayer games.

On March 23, 2023, GameClub Inc. was acquired by Take-Two Interactive, owners of fellow mobile game publisher Zynga.

As of 2025, all GameClub titles have been delisted from mobile app stores, and are unable to be downloaded.

== Games ==
As part of the service, all games available were free of ads and in-app purchases and each game released as part of GameClub includes a small 'trial' portion of content available for free without subscribing, often via a 10-minute timer which locks access to the game once the time has run out. Older titles in the service were updated to modern standards, with optimized graphics and support for newer screen sizes, as well as added support for MFi, DualShock 4 and Xbox One controllers for select titles. Editorial content, such as game guides and development history, was also available for some games.

Family sharing was available for up to twelve people under one subscription and any games that were previously purchased before releasing under GameClub could be accessed in full without a subscription.

== Reception ==
GameClub debuted to mostly positive reviews, with reviewers citing the decisions to focus on bringing back a curated selection of older games and allowing users to keep titles they previously bought as reasons to subscribe. The interface of the GameClub dashboard and hub app and were also praised, with PCMag comparing it to those of Apple. However, concerns were raised about how well the service could perform against larger competitors such as Apple Arcade.

== See also ==
- Apple Arcade
- Google Play Pass
- Xbox Game Pass
