= Stitch =

Stitch, Stitches, Stitching or Stitched may refer to:

== Medical uses ==
- Stitch, a surgical suture, a medical device used to hold body tissues together after an injury or surgery
  - Cervical cerclage, also known as a cervical stitch
- Husband stitch, a purported historical surgical procedure
- Seton stitch, a procedure used to aid the healing of fistulae
- Side stitch, an intense stabbing pain during exercise
- Stitch method, a minimally invasive procedure for pinning protruding ears

== Textile arts ==
- Stitch (textile arts), a single loop of thread or yarn
  - List of knitting stitches
  - List of sewing stitches

== People ==
- Stitches (rapper), Phillip Nickolas Katsabanis (born 1995), American rapper
- Jacob Duran, (born 1951) known as Stitch, an American boxing cutman

== Arts, entertainment, and media ==
=== Fictional characters ===
- Stitch (Lilo & Stitch), the title alien from Disney's Lilo & Stitch franchise
- Stitch, a fictional mutant in Alpha Flight comics
- Stitch (DC Comics), a fictional character from DC Comics
- Stitch, a boy in the Horrible Histories (2001 TV series)
- Stitch Rayburn, a character from The Young and the Restless
- Vikhor "Stitch" Kuzmin, an antagonist and multiplayer character from Call of Duty: Black Ops Cold War
- Stitches, a playable character in the video game Heroes of the Storm
- Stitches, a character in The Chica Show

=== Films and television ===
- Lilo & Stitch (franchise), alternately named Disney Stitch or simply Stitch, a Disney media franchise
  - Stitch!, a Japanese anime spin-off
  - Stitch! The Movie, a 2003 American direct-to-video animated science fiction comedy film and pilot to Lilo & Stitch: The Series
- Stitched (film), 2011 horror short film
- Stitches (1985 film), comedy film
- Stitches (2011 film), short film
- Stitches (2012 film), horror film
- Stitches (2019 film), Serbian film

=== Literature ===
- Stitches (book), a memoir by David Small, 2009
- Stitches: The Journal of Medical Humour, a Canadian humour magazine

=== Music ===
- Stitch, a 1995 album by Klinik
- Stitches, a 2003 album by The Boggs
- Stitches (album), a 2013 album by Califone
- "Stitches" (Orgy song), 1999
- "Stitches" (Shawn Mendes song), 2015
- The Stitches, an American punk rock band

== Other uses ==
- The Stitch, a proposed engineering project in Atlanta, U.S.
- Stitch and glue, a simple boat building method
- Stitches (store), a Canadian retailer
- Stitches, deep laughter
- Image stitching, the process of combining multiple photographic images
- Network stitching, a computing orchestration technique
- Stitching, also known as z-fighting or planefighting, a computer graphics phenomenon
- Stitch., 2022 video game

== See also ==
- Cross stitches
- Cross-stitch
- Stitch up (disambiguation)
- Stitcher Radio
