= Google Play Pass =

Games and apps subscription service

- Developer: Google
- Type: App and video game subscription service
- Launch date: September 23, 2019; 6 years ago
- Platform: Android
- Pricing model: US$4.99 monthly; US$29.99 yearly
- Website: play.google.com/about/play-pass

Global availability of Google Play Pass

Google Play Pass is an app and video game subscription service by Google for Android devices. It was launched on September 23, 2019, in the United States.

== History ==
Google Play Pass was launched on September 23, 2019, in the United States. In July 2020, the service launched in Germany, France, Australia, and Canada. The service launched in India in March 2022. In late August 2023, Google Play Pass launched in Malaysia and the Philippines. As of October 2023, the service is available in 100 countries/regions.

Subscribers can access the included apps and games for free, without ads and in-app purchases for a monthly or yearly subscription. There are over 1,000 curated titles available under the service, which range from puzzles to podcasts.

== Features ==
Google Play Pass gives users access to a curated catalog of various apps and games in the Google Play Store without any ads or the need for additional in-app purchases. Play Pass can be shared with up to five other family members.

App developers who wish to offer their app as part of the subscription can apply to be considered for inclusion in the service and according to Google, "will receive royalties based on algorithmic methods that incorporate signals which capture how users value all types of content".

== See also ==
- Apple Arcade
- GameClub
