= Ubisoft+ =

Subscription-based video game service

- Developer: Ubisoft
- Type: Subscription gaming service
- Launched: September 3, 2019
- Platforms: Luna; PlayStation 4; PlayStation 5; Stadia (formerly); Windows; Xbox One; Xbox Series X/S
- Status: Active
- Website: store.ubisoft.com/ubisoftplus

Ubisoft+ (formerly Uplay+) is a subscription-based video game service from Ubisoft, a French video game publisher. The service provides users with a vast catalog of Ubisoft titles and other benefits, including discounts on purchasing games, downloadable content (DLC) from the service's library.

Ubisoft+ is currently available in two main tiers:

- Ubisoft+ Premium: Offers access to over 100-plus games, including new releases on day 1 of launch day, early access when available, premium editions, DLC and season pass content, 20% discount on games and DLCs, 10% discount on virtual currency and monthly game rewards across PC, Xbox, PlayStation and Amazon Luna.
- Ubisoft+ Classics: A lower-cost tier focused on legacy titles available on PC, PlayStation (via PlayStation Plus Premium and Extra, as well as a standalone offer) and Xbox (via Xbox Game Pass Ultimate).

The service includes popular franchises such as Assassin's Creed, Far Cry, Watch Dogs, Rainbow Six, and The Division, and supports both cross-play and cross-platform progression for many titles.

When a user cancels their subscription, their progression is saved and linked to their Ubisoft Connect and the games will become unavailable unless the user already owns them, purchases them, or re-subscribes to Ubisoft+ again in the future.

== History ==
Ubisoft announced the new subscription service Uplay+ at E3 2019. The service launched on September 3, 2019, exclusively for Windows PC users via the Ubisoft Connect launcher.

In October 2020, Uplay+ rebranded to Ubisoft+, aligning it with the broader Ubisoft Connect ecosystem, and announced its service expansion to cloud gaming platforms Amazon Luna and Google Stadia (now defunct) for US subscribers in November 2020 and December 2020, respectively. New releases were added including Watch Dogs: Legion in October 2020, Assassin's Creed Valhalla in November 2020 and Immortals Fenyx Rising in December 2020.

In June 2022, the company launched Ubisoft+ Classics featuring older games on PlayStation consoles as part of the revamped PlayStation Plus subscription service on the Extra, Deluxe, and Premium tiers. Ubisoft+ was launched for Xbox consoles on April 12, 2023 and expanded its service on cloud gaming with GEForce NOW.

In January 2024, Ubisoft introduced Ubisoft+ Classics for Windows PC and renamed its higher-tier subscription to Ubisoft+ Premium (previously Ubisoft+ PC Access and Ubisoft+ Multi-Access). In March 2024, Ubisoft+ Classics became available on PlayStation consoles as a standalone subscription.

On September 3, 2024, StarHub has announced to bring Ubisoft+ across Southeast Asia (via GameHub+), marking the first time the service launched in the Asian markets.

In December 2025, 4 Activision titles were released on Ubisoft+ Premium following the announcement of Ubisoft's acquisition of the rights to stream Activision and Blizzard games.

== Availability ==
The service is currently available in the following countries and territories, with support for multiple currencies and payment methods: Åland Island, Libya, Albania, Liechtenstein, Algeria, Lithuania, Andorra, Luxembourg, Angola, Macedonia, Antarctica, Madagascar, Australia, Malawi, Austria, Maldives, Bahrain, Mali, Bangladesh, Malta, Belgium, Marshall Islands, Benin, Martinique, Bhutan, Mauritania, Bonaire, Mauritius, Bosnia and Herzegovina, Mayotte, Botswana, Mexico, Bouvet Island, Micronesia, Brazil, Monaco, British Indian Ocean Territory, Mongolia, Bulgaria, Montenegro, Burkina Faso, Morocco, Burundi, Mozambique, Cabo Verde, Namibia, Cameroon, Nauru, Canada, Nepal, Central African Republic, Netherlands, Chad, New Caledonia, Christmas Island, New Zealand, Cocos Island, Niger, Comoros, Nigeria, Congo, Niue, Cook Islands, Norfolk Island, Croatia, Northern Mariana Islands, Cyprus, Norway, Czech Republic, Oman, Democratic Republic of Congo, Pakistan, Denmark, Palau, Djibouti, Palestine, East Timor, Papua New Guinea, Egypt, Pitcairn, Equatorial Guinea, Poland, Eritrea, Portugal, Estonia, Qatar, Eswatini, Reunion, Ethiopia, Romania, Faroe Islands, Rwanda, Fiji, Saint Helena Ascension and Tristan da Cunha, Finland, Saint Martin, France, Saint Pierre and Miquelon, French Guiana, Samoa, French Polynesia, San Marino, French Southern Territories, São Tomé and Príncipe, Gabon, Saudi Arabia, Gambia, Senegal, Germany, Serbia, Ghana, Seychelles, Gibraltar, Sierra Leone, Greece, Sint Eustatius and Saba, Greenland, Slovakia, Guadeloupe, Slovenia, Guernsey, Solomon Islands, Guinea, Somalia, Guinea-Bissau, South Africa, Heard Islands and McDonald Islands, Spain, Holy See, Sri Lanka, Hong Kong, Svalbard and Jan Mayen, Hungary, Sweden, Iceland, Switzerland, India, Taiwan, Iraq, Tanzania, Ireland, Togo, Isle of Man, Tokelau, Israel, Tonga, Italy, Tunisia, Ivory Coast, Tuvalu, Japan, Uganda, Jersey, United Arab Emirates, Jordan, United Kingdom, Kenya, United States, Kiribati, Vanuatu, Kuwait, Wallis and Futuna, Latvia, Yemen, Lebanon, Zambia, Lesotho, and Zimbabwe.

Ubisoft+ is also available on the GeForce Now streaming service as well as Blacknut, another cloud gaming service.

== Reception ==
In January 2024, Ubisoft was criticized by some gamers following an interview statement by Philippe Tremblay, Director of Subscriptions, that they need to get "comfortable" with not "owning" their games as part of the evolving landscape of game subscription services.

== Related services & partnerships ==
Ubisoft+ is part of Ubisoft's broader digital strategy, including partnerships with:

- Amazon Luna (cloud gaming)
- GeForce Now (cloud gaming)
- Microsoft (streaming rights for Activision Blizzard titles, including Call of Duty, Crash Bandicoot, Spyro, Warcraft, Diablo and Overwatch)

These partnerships aim to expand Ubisoft+'s reach and integrate it into broader entertainment and commerce ecosystems.

== Logos ==
2019–2020

2020–present
