= Family Sharing =

Service provided by Apple Inc

Family Sharing is a service introduced in iOS 8 by Apple Inc. in June 2014, that enables the sharing of purchases from Apple stores. Six members in a group can share purchases from App Store, iTunes Store, and Apple Books Store, an Apple Music family subscription, an Apple News+ subscription, and an iCloud storage plan. Family members can also share a photo album, calendar, and reminders, and help locate each other's missing devices. Purchases and other downloads made from non-Apple sources cannot be shared using Family Sharing. Family Sharing can be used on iPhone, iPad, or iPod touch with iOS 8 or later, on Mac with OS X Yosemite (version 10.10) or later and iTunes 12, or a PC with iCloud for Windows.

One adult acts as the "organizer" of the group and controls the family group settings, and all payments for the group are effected through the organizer's credit card. When each member joins the group, Family Sharing is set up on their devices automatically. The organizer can designate a member as a child, whose purchases can be set to require parental approval. If a member wants to add more services to share with the group, the organizer can update the Family Sharing settings at any time.

Members can register unique Apple IDs that are then linked by the organizer. Purchases made on one account can be shared with the other family group members. Purchases or free downloads to be made by child members may require the organizer's approval, and purchases by adults will not be visible to child members.

Family Sharing also extends into apps. For example, a shared album is automatically generated in the Photos app of each family member, allowing everyone to add photos, videos, and comments to a shared place. An Ask to Buy feature allows anyone to request the purchase of items in the App Store, iTunes Store, and Apple Books Store, as well as in-app purchases and iCloud storage, with the administrator having the option to either approve or deny the purchase.

== See also ==
- Find My iPhone
- iCloud
