= List of video games developed in Austria =

This is a list of released and upcoming video games developed in Austria. The list is sorted by game title, platform, year of release, their developer and their publisher.

Title	Platform	Year	Developer	Publisher
Der verlassene Planet (Note: In 2015, researchers Konstantin Mitgutsch and Herbert Rosenstingl credited Der verlassene Planet as "the first commercial video game developed in Austria". It appeared on a floppy disk bundled with Markt & Technik's magazine 64'er. Developer Hannes Seifert went on to co-found Neo Software in 1993. Also see DE C64-Wiki.)	Commodore 64	1989	Hannes Seifert (DE wiki)	Markt & Technik
Cash	Amiga	1991	Max Design	Max Design
Th!nk Cross	Amiga, Atari ST, Commodore 64, MS-DOS	1991	JoWood Computer Games	Max Design
1869	MS-DOS, Amiga	1992	Max Design	Max Design
Holy Mission	Computer devices	1992	Project community	Project community
Burntime	Amiga, MS-DOS	1993	Max Design	Max Design
Whale's Voyage	Amiga, Amiga CD32, MS-DOS	1993	Neo Software	Flair Software
Motor City	Amiga, MS-DOS	1994	Max Design	Max Design
The Clue!	Amiga, Amiga CD32, MS-DOS	1994	"... and avoid panic by", Neo Software	Max Design
Albert Lasser's Clearing House	MS-DOS	1995	Max Design	Max Design
Dark Universe: Hüter des Friedens	MS-DOS	1995	MARTIN Gesmbh & Co. KG	Max Design
Prototype	MS-DOS	1995	Surprise! Productions, Neo Software	Max Design
Whale's Voyage II: Die Übermacht	Amiga, MS-DOS	1995	Neo Software	Neo Software
Strike Base	MS-DOS	1996	Max Design	Max Design
THiNK-X	Windows 3.1x	1996	JoWood Ebensee	Macmillan Digital Publishing USA
Industry Giant	Microsoft Windows	1997	JoWood Ebensee	JoWood Productions
Anno 1602	Microsoft Windows	1998	Max Design	Sunflowers Interactive
Rent-a-Hero	Microsoft Windows	1998	Neo Software	Magic Bytes
Alien Nations	Microsoft Windows, MacOS	1999	Neo Software	JoWooD Productions
Traffic Giant	Microsoft Windows	2000	JoWood Ebensee	JoWood Productions
Astral Tournament	Microsoft Windows	2001	Apus Software	Apus Software
The Nations	Microsoft Windows	2001	JoWooD Vienna	JoWooD Productions
The Sting!	Microsoft Windows	2001	Neo Software	JoWooD Productions
Anno 1503	Microsoft Windows	2002	Max Design, Sunflowers Interactive	Sunflowers Interactive
Industry Giant II	Microsoft Windows	2002	JoWood Ebensee	JoWood Productions
Pusher	Microsoft Windows	2002	JoWooD Vienna	JoWooD Productions
Itch!	Microsoft Windows	2003	JoWooD Vienna	Bigben Interactive
Neighbours from Hell	Microsoft Windows, GameCube, Xbox, Nintendo DS, iOS	2003	JoWooD Vienna	JoWooD Productions
Neighbours from Hell 2: On Vacation	Microsoft Windows	2004	JoWooD Vienna	JoWooD Productions
Transport Giant	Microsoft Windows, PlayStation 4	2004, 2017 (PS4)	JoWood Ebensee	JoWood Productions
Avencast: Rise of the Mage	Microsoft Windows	2007	ClockStone	Lighthouse Interactive
Gallop & Ride	Wii	2008	Sproing Interactive Media	THQ
Niki – Rock 'n' Ball	Wii	2008	Bplus	Bplus
And Yet It Moves	Wii, iOS, Microsoft Windows	2009	Broken Rules	Broken Rules
Bit Boy!!	Wii	2009	Bplus	Bplus
Cursed Mountain	Wii, Microsoft Windows	2009	Sproing Interactive Media, Deep Silver Vienna	Deep Silver
Harms Way	Xbox 360	2010	Bongfish	Microsoft Game Studios
Gray Matter	Microsoft Windows, Xbox 360	2010	Wizarbox, ClockStone	DTP Entertainment
Logos Cards	Windows	2010	Florian Kraner, Darien Caldwell	Florian Kraner, Darien Caldwell
Crazy Hedgy	iOS, Android	2011	Cybertime	Cybertime
Bridge Constructor	Android, iOS, Linux, macOS, Microsoft Windows, Nintendo Switch, PlayStation 4, PlayStation Vita, Wii U, Windows Phone, Xbox One	2011	ClockStone	Headup Games
Chasing Aurora	Wii U	2012	Broken Rules	Broken Rules
Ærena: Clash of Champions	Android, iOS, Microsoft Windows	2013	Cliffhanger Productions	Cliffhanger Productions
Blek	iOS, Android, Wii U	2013	Kunabi Brother	Kunabi Brother
Jagged Alliance Online	Browser game, Microsoft Windows	2013	Cliffhanger Productions	Gamigo AG, bitComposer Games
Motocross Madness	Xbox 360	2013	Bongfish	Microsoft Studios
The Dark Eye: Realms of Arkania - Blade of Destiny (Remake)	Microsoft Windows, Linux, macOS, PlayStation 4, Xbox One	2013	Crafty Studios Game Development	United Independent Entertainment
Bit Boy!! Arcade	Nintendo 3DS	2014	Bplus	Bplus
Mining Industry Simulator	Microsoft Windows, Linux, macOS	2014	Crafty Studios Game Development	Koch Media GmbH (Austria)
Secrets of Rætikon	Microsoft Windows, macOS, Linux	2014	Broken Rules	Broken Rules
Ori and the Blind Forest	Microsoft Windows, Nintendo Switch, Xbox One	2015	Moon Studios	Microsoft Studios
Shadowrun Chronicles: Boston Lockdown	Android, iOS, Linux, macOS, Microsoft Windows	2015	Cliffhanger Productions	Cliffhanger Productions (Steam), Nordic Games (Retail)
Oil Enterprise	Microsoft Windows, Linux, macOS	2016	Crafty Studios Game Development	astragon Entertainment
The Lion's Song: Episode 1 - Silence	Microsoft Windows, Linux, macOS, Nintendo Switch, Android, iOS	2016	Mi'pu'mi Games	Mi'pu'mi Games
Bridge Constructor Portal	Android, iOS, Linux, macOS, Microsoft Windows, Nintendo Switch, PlayStation 4, Xbox One	2017	ClockStone	Headup Games
Old Man's Journey	Android, iOS, macOS, Microsoft Windows, Nintendo Switch, PlayStation 4, Xbox One	2017	Broken Rules	Broken Rules
The Dark Eye: Realms of Arkania - Star Trail (Remake)	Microsoft Windows, Linux, macOS, PlayStation 4, Xbox One	2017	Crafty Studios Game Development	United Independent Entertainment
Airport Simulator 2019	Microsoft Windows, PlayStation 4, Xbox One	2018	Toplitz Productions, ALTUMVI d.o.o.	Toplitz Productions
ELOH	iOS, Android	2018	Broken Rules, Salon Alpin, jcstranger	Broken Rules
Jagged Alliance: Rage!	Microsoft Windows, PlayStation 4, Xbox One	2018	Cliffhanger Productions	HandyGames
My Little Riding Champion	Microsoft Windows, PlayStation 4, Xbox One, Nintendo Switch	2018	Toplitz Productions, Caipirinha Games	Toplitz Productions, Bigben Interactive S.A.
Roman the Worm	Microsoft Windows	2018	RadM, MediaTale Games	RadM, MediaTale Games
Fantasy General 2: Invasion	Microsoft Windows, Nintendo Switch, PlayStation 4, Xbox One	2019	Owned by Gravity	Slitherine Software
Farmer's Dynasty	Microsoft Windows, PlayStation 4, Xbox One, Nintendo Switch	2019	Toplitz Productions, UMEO Studios	Toplitz Productions, Bigben Interactive S.A.
John The Electrician	Microsoft Windows, Android, iOS, Browser game	2019	John Andre Krogedal Gressløs, MediaTale Games	MediaTale Games
Hunt The Lights	Microsoft Windows	2020	Wild Monkeygames	Wild Monkeygames
MisBits	Microsoft Windows	2020	Pow Wow Entertainment, Purple Lamp Studios	3BD GAMES LLC
Neighbours back From Hell	Android, Microsoft Windows, Nintendo Switch, PlayStation 4, Xbox One	2020	FarbWorks	HandyGames
Ori and the Will of the Wisps	Microsoft Windows, Xbox One	2020	Moon Studios	Xbox Game Studios
SpongeBob SquarePants: Battle for Bikini Bottom – Rehydrated	Microsoft Windows, Nintendo Switch, PlayStation 4, Xbox One, Android, iOS, tvOS, Google Stadia, Amazon Luna	2020	Purple Lamp Studios	THQ Nordic
The Flower Collectors	Microsoft Windows, Nintendo Switch	2020	Mi'pu'mi Games	Mi'pu'mi Games
The VR CANYON	Microsoft Windows	2020	Wild Monkeygames	Wild Monkeygames
Lumberjack's Dynasty	Microsoft Windows, PlayStation 4, Xbox One, Xbox Series X/S	2021	Toplitz Productions, UMEO Studios	Toplitz Productions
Blood and Zombies	Microsoft Windows	2022	Wild Monkeygames	Freedom Games
Chonky - From Breakfast to Domination	Microsoft Windows	2022	Enhydra Games	Enhydra Games
Forgotten Fables: Wolves on the Westwind	Microsoft Windows, iOS	2022	Owned by Gravity	Ulisses Digital
Gibbon: Beyond the Trees	iOS, Microsoft Windows, macOS, Nintendo Switch	2022	Broken Rules	Broken Rules
Psych	Microsoft Windows	2022	MediaTale Games	MediaTale Games
Slopecrashers	Microsoft Windows, Linux, macOS	2022	byteparrot	byteparrot
Guild of Dragons	Microsoft Windows, macOS	2023	Artcue e.U.	Artcue e.U.
Howl	Microsoft Windows, Nintendo Switch	2023	Mi'pu'mi Games	Mi'pu'mi Games
Jected: Rivals	Microsoft Windows	2023	Pow Wow Entertainment	THQ Nordic, Pow Wow Entertainment
Midnight Heist	Microsoft Windows	2023	MediaTale Games	MediaTale Games
SpellForce: Conquest of Eo	Microsoft Windows, Xbox Series X/S, PlayStation 5	2023	Owned by Gravity	THQ Nordic
SpongeBob SquarePants: The Cosmic Shake	Microsoft Windows, Nintendo Switch, PlayStation 4, Xbox One, Xbox Series X/S, PlayStation 5	2023	Purple Lamp Studios	THQ Nordic
No Rest for the Wicked	Microsoft Windows, Xbox Series X/S, PlayStation 5	2024 (EA)	Moon Studios	Private Division
Hyperspaced	Microsoft Windows	2025	Rarebyte	Headup Games
A Webbing Journey	Microsoft Windows, macOS, Linux, iOS, Android	2025 (EA)	Fire Totem Games	Future Friends Games, Fire Totem Games
