= Scntfc =

American composer and sound designer

scntfc
- Also known as: Scientific American
- Born: Andrew Rohrmann
- Origin: Seattle, Washington
- Genres: EDM; Hip hop; Rock
- Occupations: Composer; Sound designer
- Years active: 2000s - present
- Labels: Bandcamp; Mush; Slabco
- Formerly of: Hush Harbor
- Website: scntfc.com

Andrew Rohrmann, better known by his stage name scntfc (formerly Scientific American), is an American composer and sound designer. His solo productions, which incorporate elements of electronic dance music, hip-hop, and rock, have been used by The Seattle Art Museum, the Sound Unseen Film Festival in Minneapolis and for well-known television ads promoting Hewlett-Packard and Discover.

== History ==
After establishing himself as a member of Seattle's indie rock scene with his band Hush Harbor, scntfc became interested in the idea of using the computer as his primary instrument.

In 2001 Rohrmann formed a production company along with Plastiq Phantom named Polar Empire. They have done commercial compositions for clients such as Nike, MTV, Volkswagen, and AMC. He has completed critically praised remixes for a number of indie favorites including Modest Mouse, 764-Hero, and Red Stars Theory. He has also composed and produced the sound for the 2016 game Oxenfree, and composed the music for several of Broken Rules' games.

== Portfolio ==
Year	Title	Type	Role
2001	Saints of Infinity	Album	Composer
2001	Undone	Soundtrack	Composer
2002	tencore	Album	Composer
2011	The Hanford Reach e.p.	Extended play	Composer
2011	tubes	Album	Composer
2011	Xbox 360 system software	Software	Sound designer
2011	ZMD: Zombies of Mass Destruction	Soundtrack	Composer
2012	Pierce The Air (scntfc vs Andrew Luck vs Dosadi remix)	Remix	Composer
2012	Sword and Sorcery: Moon Grotto	Album	Composer
2013	Rogue Legacy Reborn	Soundtrack	Composer
2013	Lotus	Soundtrack	Composer
2014	Peggle 2 Remixes	Remix	Composer
2014	Plants vs. Zombies 2 Zen-Garden theme	Soundtrack	Composer
2015	Vector-Z: Space Ranger	Soundtrack	Composer
2015	Galak-Z: The Dimensional	Soundtrack	Composer
2015	Odd, Fugl, et Luna	Album	Composer
2016	Mr. Robot: Exfiltrati0n	Soundtrack	Composer
2016	Oxenfree	Soundtrack	Composer
2016	Side Stories	Extended play	Composer
2017	Old Man's Journey	Soundtrack	Composer
2018	ELOH	Soundtrack	Composer
2019	Afterparty	Soundtrack	Composer
2019	Sneaky Sasquatch	Soundtrack	Composer
2021	Jett: The Far Shore	Soundtrack	Composer
2021	Oxenfree II: Lost Signals	Soundtrack	Composer
2022	Gibbon: Beyond the Trees	Soundtrack	Composer
