= Jett: The Far Shore =

- Developers: Superbrothers; Pine Scented Software
- Publishers: Superbrothers; Pine Scented Software
- Designer: Craig Adams
- Programmer: Patrick McAllister
- Composer: Scntfc
- Engine: Unity
- Platforms: Windows; PlayStation 4; PlayStation 5
- Release: October 5, 2021
- Genre: Action-adventure
- Mode: Single-player

Jett: The Far Shore is an action-adventure exploration video game developed and published by Superbrothers and Pine Scented Software. The game was released in October 2021 for Windows, PlayStation 4 and PlayStation 5.

== Gameplay ==
Jett: The Far Shore is an action-adventure exploration game. In the game, the player assumes control of Mei, a "Jett scout" who must explore an ocean planet and examine its wildlife while tracing the source of a mysterious signal known as the "hymnwave". In the game, Mei commands a vehicle named "jett" in order to quickly navigate the sea and the land. Mei can speed up the jett using thrusters, and used abilities such as hopping into the air and rolling, though performing these actions in short succession may short-circuit the engine.

As one of the first explorers of the ocean planet, Mei must investigate the planet's flora and fauna. The ship has three essential tools: the flashlight, the scanner, and a grappling hook, which can be used to interact with the wildlife. The goal was to observe the reactions of the wildlife to the external stimuli. The game does not emphasize combat and requires the players to carefully interact with these native creatures so as to minimize the disturbance. Players must also make use of the landscape of the planet to avoid or escape from conflict. Occasionally, the game cuts to first-person, in which the player can visit the home base and talk to other non-playable characters.

== Development ==
Jett: The Far Shore was developed by Superbrothers in conjunction with Pine Scented Software, developers of Superbrothers: Sword & Sworcery EP (2011). Scntfc, who have previously worked on the music of Oxenfree, served as the game's composer. Superbrothers founder Craig Adams and Pine Scented Software's programmer Patrick McAllister first met with each other in 2007 and agreed to collaborate on a new game. The game's development commenced in mid-2013. The two worked on their own until 2016 when they realized that the development time took too long and both of them were running out of capital to continue the game's development. Therefore, the team prepared a demo of the game and presented it to Sony Interactive Entertainment and Epic Games in order to attract additional talents. As a result, the team recruited the "Jett squad", which was a group of contributors working remotely to add content for the game. Members of the squad included Randy Smith, Terri Brosius, and singer-songwriter Jim Guthrie.

It placed a heavy emphasis on traversal. According to designer Craig Adams, the team designed the spaceship so that it move in a way that would feel novel and compelling. The game was inspired by a range of titles, such as Monster Hunter, MotorStorm: Pacific Rift, SSX 3, and Wave Race 64. Craig, in particular, was influenced by works of Fumito Ueda, including Shadow of the Colossus and Ico, and thatgamecompany's Flower. Initially the game features procedural generation, but this focus was shifted to refining the game's narrative and world design after No Man's Sky became a breakout success. As development progressed, the team looked into more video games, including Thirty Flights of Loving, Firewatch and Below for inspirations.

The game was officially announced during Sony's PlayStation 5 reveal event. Initially set to be released in late 2020, the game was delayed to 2021 as the team wanted to spend more time refining the game. The game was released for PlayStation 4, PlayStation 5 and Windows via the Epic Games Store on October 5, 2021.

== Reception ==
Reception

Aggregate score
Aggregator	Score
Metacritic	(PC) 66/100 (PS4) 61/100 (PS5) 68/100

Review scores
Publication	Score
Game Informer	6.75/10
GameSpot	5/10
GamesRadar+	3/5
PC Gamer (US)	70/100
Push Square	6/10

Jett: The Far Shore received "mixed or average" reviews according to review aggregator Metacritic.
