= Adam Hines =

American graphic novelist and writer

Adam Hines is an American graphic novelist and a writer, designer, and director of video games. He is the creative director of Night School Studio, which he co-founded, and the author of Duncan the Wonder Dog: Show One.

== Career ==
Hines is known for the graphic novel Duncan the Wonder Dog (2010), which won a Xeric Grant, the 2011 Lynd Ward Graphic Novel Prize, and the Los Angeles Times Book Prize for Graphic Novel/Comics, and which came in first for the 2010 ComicsAlliance list of the year's best comics. The book was planned to be the first of a nine-book series.

Hines worked at Telltale Games, where he was one of the writers for The Wolf Among Us and Tales from the Borderlands.

In 2014, Hines and cousin Sean Krankel founded video game development company Night School Studio. He was the writer and (with Krankel) the co-designer and co-director of Night School Studio's first game, Oxenfree, which was nominated for multiple awards, including "Best Narrative" at The Game Awards 2016 and "Outstanding Achievement in Story" at the 20th Annual D.I.C.E. Awards.

Hines was also the writer for other Night School Studio games Afterparty and Mr. Robot:1.51exfiltrati0n (co-developed with Telltale Games), and lead writer for Oxenfree II: Lost Signals. Mr. Robot:1.51exfiltrati0n was nominated for the Writers Guild of America Awards for Outstanding Achievement in Videogame Writing in 2017.

== Personal life ==
Hines is from the suburbs of Chicago. As of 2014, he lived in northern California.

== List of works ==
=== Books ===
- Duncan the Wonder Dog Show One (400 pages, AdHouse Books, November 9, 2010)

=== Video games ===
Year	Title	Role	Developer(s)
2013	The Wolf Among Us	co-writer	Telltale Games
2014	Tales from the Borderlands	co-writer	Telltale Games
2016	Oxenfree	writer, co-designer, co-director	Night School Studio
2016	Mr. Robot:1.51exfiltrati0n	writer	Telltale Games and Night School Studio
2019	Afterparty	writer	Night School Studio
2023	Oxenfree II: Lost Signals	lead writer	Night School Studio
