= Night School Studio =

American video game developer

Night School Studio, LLC
- Type: Subsidiary
- Industry: Video games
- Founded: June 6, 2014; 12 years ago
- Founder: Sean Krankel; Adam Hines
- Defunct: August 2026
- Headquarters: Glendale, California, U.S.
- Area served: Worldwide
- Key people: Sean Krankel (CCO); Adam Hines (creative director); Heather Gross (lead artist); Bryant Cannon (lead engineer)
- Products: Oxenfree; Mr. Robot:1.51exfiltrati0n; Afterparty; Oxenfree II: Lost Signals; |Unhinged: Obsession
- Parent: Netflix (2021–2026)
- Website: nightschoolstudio.com

Night School Studio, LLC was an American video game developer and publisher. It was founded on June 6, 2014, by Sean Krankel and Adam Hines, and it was based in Glendale, California.

After the founding of the company, the team started development on its debut game, Oxenfree. After setting up a casting call on Backstage, the team moved to the development of the game. The first footage was released on May 18, 2015, and the release was set for January 2016. Soon after, the game received positive reviews and a film adaptation was being planned with Skybound Entertainment.

Along with Telltale Games, Night School Studio also co-developed the "Text Adventure" mode for Mr. Robot:1.51exfiltrati0n (called Mr. Robot:1.51exfiltrati0n.ipa on iOS and Mr. Robot:1.51exfiltrati0n.apk on Android). Night School Studio was acquired by Netflix in September 2021 as part of the streaming service's venture into video games. Netflix announced the closure of the studio in August 2026 as part of its refocusing of its video game division.

== History ==
Night School Studio was founded on October 1, 2014 by Sean Krankel and his cousin Adam Hines, both respectively former Disney Interactive Studios and Telltale Games developers. After setting up the company, the team then decided to develop a new game. Soon after, a casting call was issued by the company on Backstage which then expired on November 21, 2014.

On March 1, 2015, the team posted a video titled "OXENFREE Official Trailer #1" onto its YouTube account. The group then announced Oxenfree on March 5, in which the plot revolved around a group of teenagers exploring a decommissioned island surrounded by ghosts. The studio, according to Krankel, had a very tight budget and could only make a single game. Gameplay footage was then released on 18 May. On October 23, the second teaser was released, as well as the game's release slated for January 2016. On October 27, in an interview with Koalition, when asked about the talking mechanic, Krankel said:

If talking is the core mechanic of the game, how can we streamline the talking process? First, we can stop taking player control away and forcing the player into a cut scene. Next, we can put the dialogue choices as close to the player character as possible, so their dialogue choices really feel like an extension of their avatar. Those two design goals really drove a lot of our creative choices; everything from camera placement to the art direction to the pacing of the game.

On January 14, 2016, the launch trailer was released. A day after, the game was released for Microsoft Windows, OS X and Xbox One. Within the same day, Skybound Entertainment announced a partnership with Night School Studio, in which a web series entitled The Story of Oxenfree was then released, detailing development on the game, as well a film adaptation and merchandise. On April 27 the company then announced that PlayStation 4 version would be released, with an extended mode called Game+, and was included in all versions after release. It was then released on 31 May, with a Linux version released on June 1. The game received positive reviews from critics, and was selected for Indiecade, which will be hosted from October 14–16 in San Francisco.

During August 2016, Mr. Robot:1.51exfiltrati0n, a mobile game based on the television series Mr. Robot, was developed by Night School Studio, the company's mobile debut, and published by Telltale. Following release, a "Text" mode, being co-developed by Telltale, was also included within the game as well.

Around this time, Telltale had acquired the rights to make a game based on the television show Stranger Things. While Telltale was planning its own adventure game, it contacted Night School to develop a companion game, a first-person narrative title that would serve as a lead-in to its game. Night School brought in four more staff to help with this game. However, over the course of 2017 and 2018, Telltale had several internal issues, leading to difficulties in communication between the Telltale and Night School teams, and failure of Telltale to pay for completed milestones. In October 2018, Telltale announced its surprise closure, leaving Night School's game in limbo. According to a source speaking to The Verge, Night School would have also suffered financial hardships if it had not been concurrently working on Afterparty as well.

Night School Studio was acquired by Netflix in September 2021, as part of Netflix's venture into video game offerings. The acquisition did not affect the studio's work on Oxenfree II.

In September 2024, Night School removed Oxenfree from the Itch.io storefront and sent users who had purchased the game on the platform a message informing them that they would no longer be able to download the game from Itch.io as of 1 October 2024, which led some fans online to blame Night School Studio owner Netflix for the removal.

With the release of the seventh season of Black Mirror, Night School developed a mobile version of the game Thronglets, which is used as a plot element within the episode "Plaything" in the season. The game was co-developed along with Charlie Brooker's production of the episode, such that the real-world game would feel as if it "literally got lifted out of the episode".

As part of refocusing its game content around party and story-driven games, Netflix announced it would close Night School on August 13, 2026.

== Games developed ==
Year	Title	Genre(s)	Platform(s)
2016	Oxenfree	Graphic adventure	Windows, Mac, Linux, PS4, Xbox One, Switch, iOS, Android
2016	Mr. Robot:1.51exfiltrati0n	Adventure	iOS, Android
2017	The Mummy: Dark Universe Stories	Adventure	iOS, Android
2019	Afterparty	Graphic adventure	Windows, Mac, PS4, Xbox One, Switch
2020	Next Stop Nowhere	Adventure	iOS, Mac
2023	Oxenfree II: Lost Signals	Graphic adventure	Windows, PS4, PS5, Switch, Android, iOS
2025	Thronglets	Life simulation	Android, iOS
2026	Unhinged	Horror	Android, iOS

== See also ==
- Duncan the Wonder Dog by co-founder Adam Hines
