= And Yet It Moves =

2009 video game

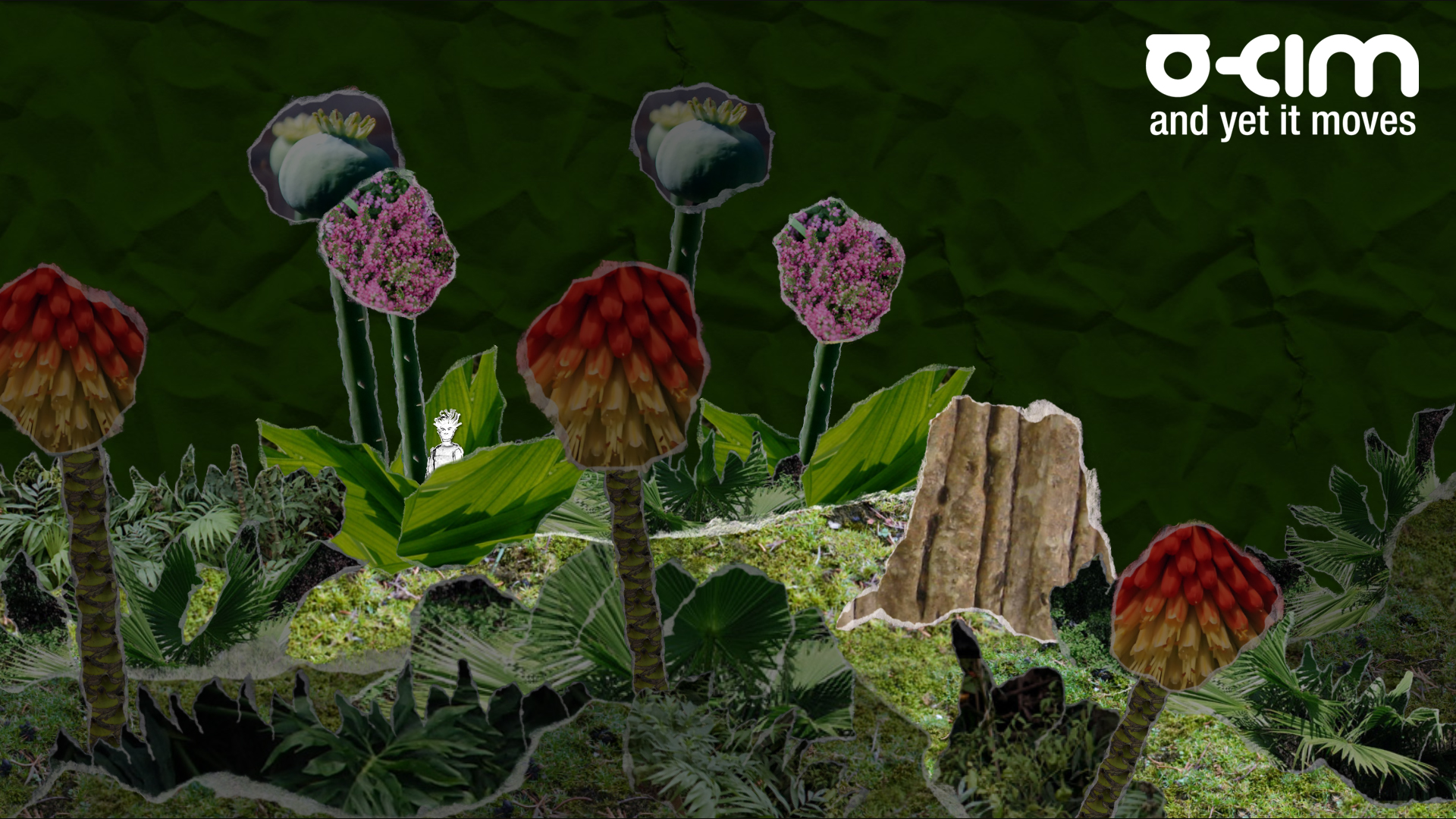
- Title card
- Developer: Broken Rules
- Publisher: Broken Rules
- Designers: Christoph Binder; Felix Bohatsch; Jan Hackl; Peter Vorlaufer
- Programmer: Peter Vorlaufer
- Artist: Jan Hackl
- Composer: Christoph Binder
- Engine: Torque
- Platforms: Windows, Mac OS X, Linux, Wii, iOS
- Release: Windows, OS X, Linux; April 2, 2009; Wii: NA: August 23, 2010; PAL: August 27, 2010; iOS; January 29, 2015
- Genre: Puzzle-platform
- Mode: Single-player

And Yet It Moves is a puzzle-platform game developed by independent developer Broken Rules. The game was released for Microsoft Windows, Mac OS X, and Linux on April 2, 2009, and for Wii as a WiiWare title in August 2010. And Yet It Moves was originally designed as a computer science project at the Vienna University of Technology in 2007. When the original prototype won or was nominated for awards at various independent game festivals, the team decided to create a full version of the game.

And Yet It Moves focuses on moving the player character through a series of hazardous environments. The player possesses the ability to freely rotate the entire game world, transforming walls into floors and vice versa. The game's levels and puzzles are designed around this concept. The game features paper-collage-styled visuals designed by Jan Hackl and a soundtrack performed by Christoph Binder.

The game received positive reviews, with many critics applauding the gameplay and the visuals. And Yet It Moves was also released as part of the third Humble Indie Bundle.

== Gameplay ==
And Yet It Moves is a single-player puzzle-platform game set in a world stylized to resemble a paper collage, where background elements and characters consist of ripped paper. The nameless player character, who appears as a cutout pencil line-drawing on white paper, is directed through a series of levels by running and jumping across the obstacles and avoiding hazards. The player possesses the ability to "spin" the entire game world in 90 or 180 degree increments at any time. Because the rotation is instantaneous and gravity will always point "downward" relative to the game screen, spinning the world has physical consequences on the player character and on the environment: walls that are too steep to climb become flat, walkable surfaces, and objects may move or react to the change in gravity. All objects retain their momentum relative to their frame of reference.

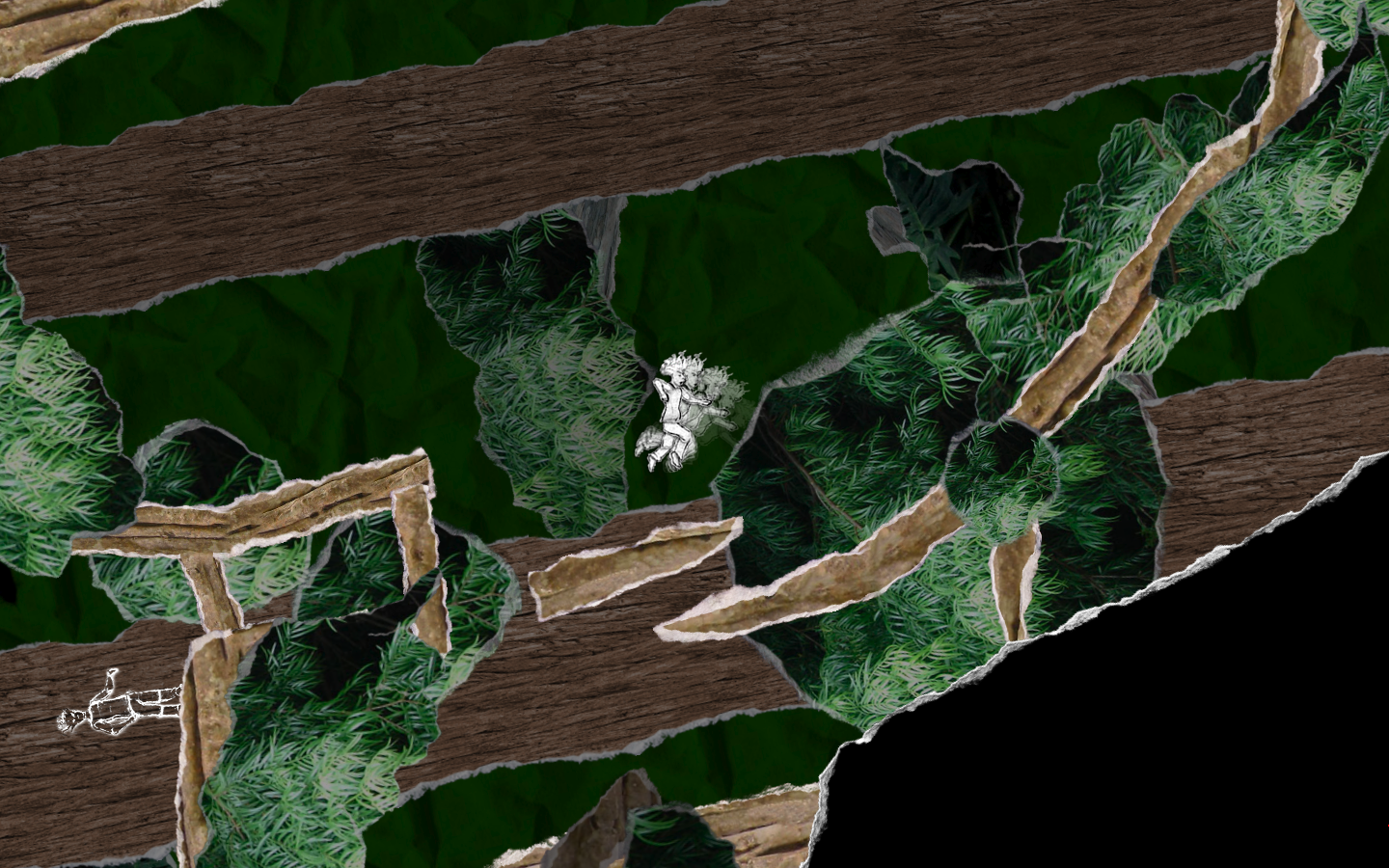
The game focuses on rotating the world around the player character in order to surmount walls too steep to climb or maneuver around complex obstacles.

The levels in And Yet It Moves are designed such that spinning the world at certain moments is required to progress. Because the character will tear into pieces if he falls from too high a distance, the player must often spin the world such that the character can safely surmount or descend from large obstacles. Other hazards such as wild beasts, fire and boulders, or falling into the black void that borders the playing field will tear the character. However, the player has unlimited lives and will reappear at the last checkpoint he passed prior to being torn.

The main campaign mode offers 17 levels that span three different environments. There are other gameplay features available, such as online leaderboards, various time attack modes, and optional achievements that are awarded for performing specific objectives.

In the Wii version, players control the game using the Wii Remote held sideways, and the game world is rotated by twisting the controller in various directions. The Nunchuk and Classic Controller are also compatible for alternate control schemes. This version also removes the restriction to only rotate in 90 degree intervals and offers three additional levels compared to the PC versions.

== Development ==
And Yet It Moves is the first video game developed by Broken Rules, an independent game developer based in Vienna. The game began as a bachelor project held by the Department for Design and Assessment of Technology at the Vienna University of Technology. The four computer science students involved wanted to design a game that gave the player more freedom than possible in normal 2D games; a side-scrolling platform game with the ability to rotate the entire game world was chosen. A prototype of the game took half a year to develop using the Torque game engine, and the name And Yet It Moves was chosen for its ambiguity and "it hints at world rotation," an allusion to Galileo Galilei's famous apocryphal remark "Eppur si muove". The prototype was showcased at various independent game development festivals and garnered positive feedback; it was nominated in the Student Showcase category of the 2007 Independent Games Festival as well as for the 2007 Europrix Top Talent Award. The interest in the title inspired the students to develop a full game, which took approximately two years. Broken Rules was founded when it was realized that "it was a necessity [in order] to better deal with all the organizational, financial and juridical hassles that are involved when making business."

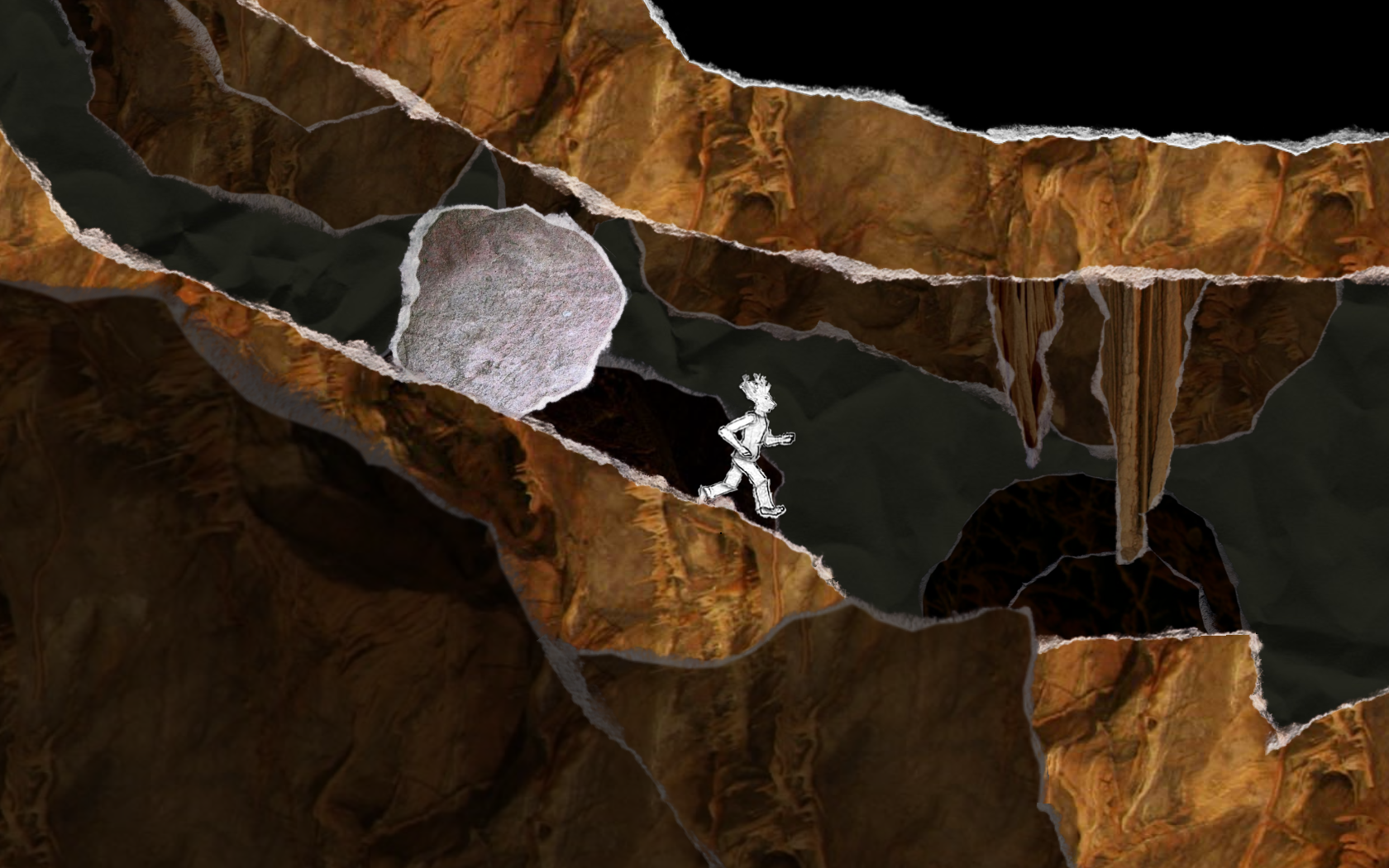
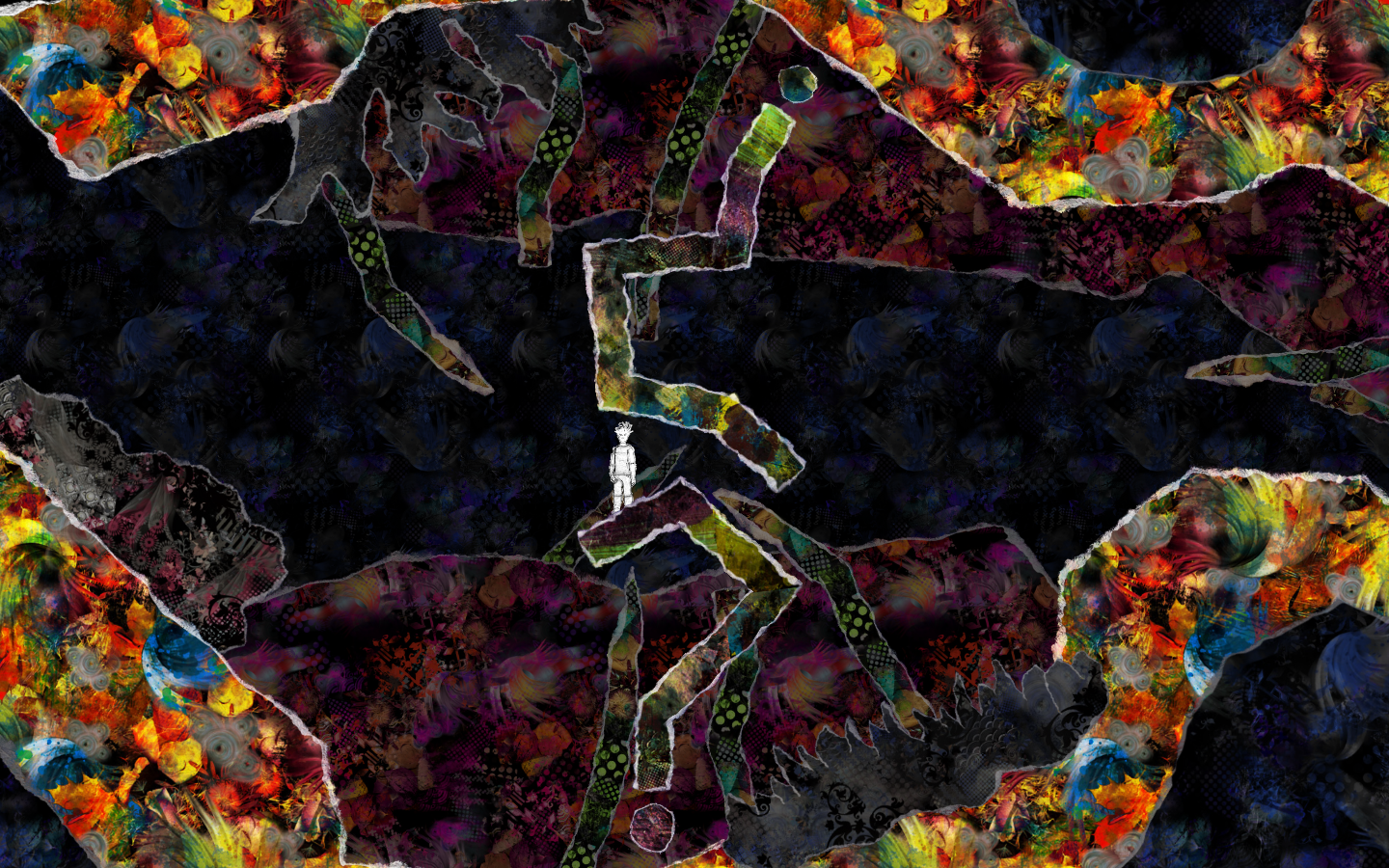

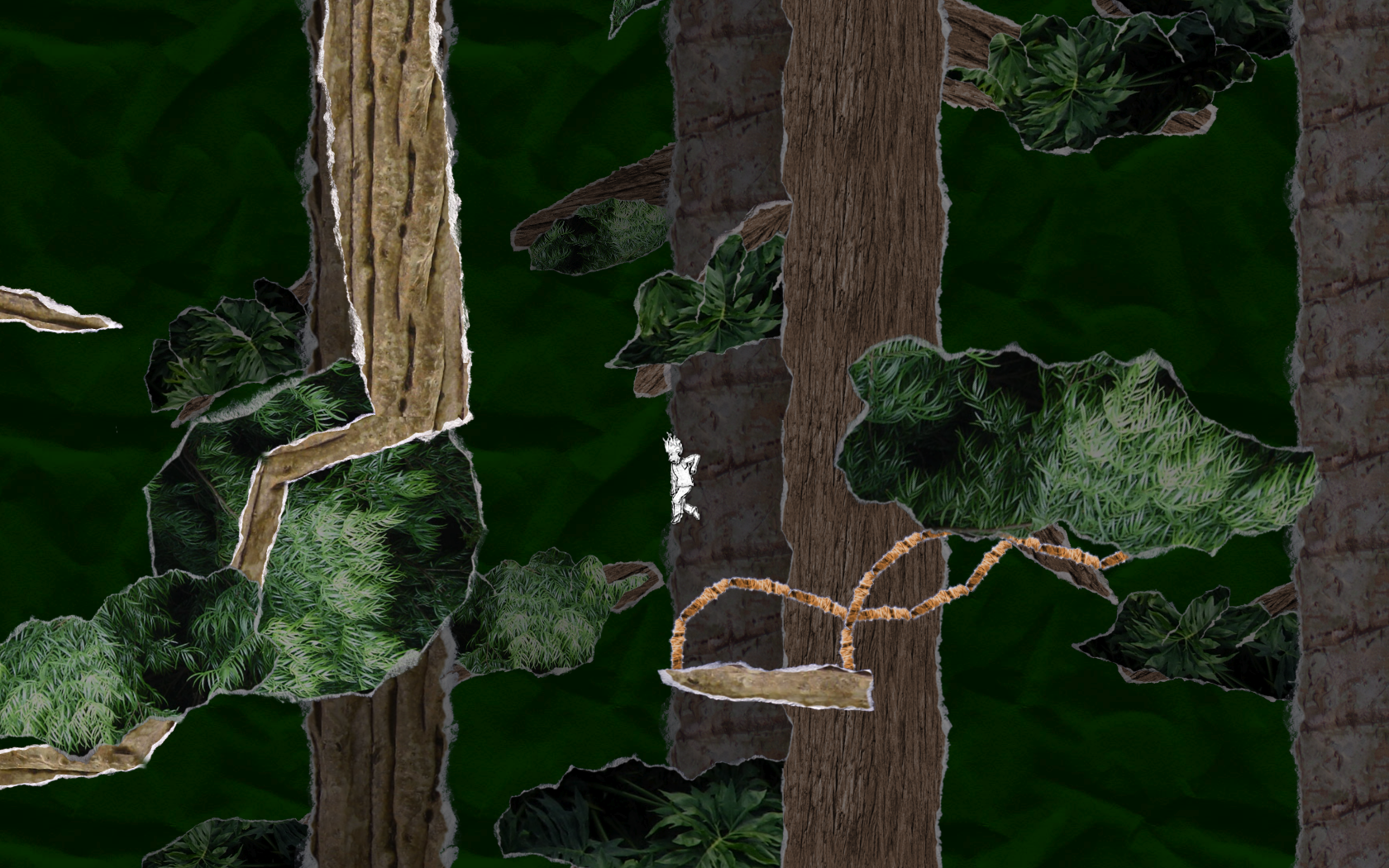
Broken Rules collected photographs from public domain sources in order to create the game's ripped paper collage look.

Broken Rules did not have a dedicated artist, so the designers chose a graphical style they believed was both aesthetically pleasing and easy to create. A pencil-on-paper look was first attempted, but it appeared "empty and boring" until photographs, collected from public sources such as morgueFile, were added. The style evolved into the game's final ripped paper collage look, intended to appear "rough and analog." Designer Christoph Binder created the game's background music and sound effects by beatboxing, echoing this motif. Felix Bohatsch, the project lead, stated in an interview that adding a narrative or backstory was avoided in favor of prioritizing the gameplay. He added however that the level design follows a leitmotif that conveys "a journey from being confined to becoming free" as the game progresses, first beginning in dark caves and ending in a wide blank space.

In October 2008, Nintendo contacted Broken Rules and asked if a downloadable WiiWare version of And Yet It Moves could be developed for its Wii console after seeing a demonstration of the game at the 2008 IndieCade Festival in Los Angeles. Bohatsch stated that "we didn't think long about this decision because we always wanted to bring And Yet It Moves to a console and I have a sweet spot for the Wii." However, the PC game's projected release date was April 2, 2009; it was too late in development to begin co-developing for Wii and launch simultaneously on both platforms. PC version development was completed first and then Wii development started in June.

And Yet It Moves was originally designed to be played with button controls, and the player could only rotate in 90 degree intervals; for the Wii version, Broken Rules determined from playtesting that allowing the player to freely rotate to any degree best suited the Wii Remote's motion controls. Four different control schemes were implemented to satisfy a wide number of players, three of which either use motion control or the Wii Remote pointer. While the file size limit imposed on WiiWare games was not an issue, the visuals were downsampled to cohere with the Wii hardware. A standard-definition television was used in development; Bohatsch felt the visuals looked nicer on the SDTV than on a PC or Mac with higher display resolution, but warned that some HDTVs might not upsample the Wii resolution properly, recommending that a component cable be used while playing the game. Online leaderboards were omitted from the Wii version as they were not widely used. Three new levels, unlocked when the player completes the main campaign mode, were added. The near final version of the game was submitted to Nintendo's Quality Assurance team in May 2010 to inspect and find bugs. And Yet It Moves was released on the Wii Shop Channel in North America on August 23, 2010 and then in Europe on August 27.

Broken Rules currently has no plans to develop a sequel to And Yet It Moves, due to the time spent on the game. Bohatsch commented that he is unopposed to the idea and is amenable to proposals to develop such a game.

== Reception ==
Reception

Aggregate scores
| Aggregator | Score |
|---|---|
| GameRankings | PC: 71.50% (8 reviews); Wii: 85.30% (20 reviews) |
| Metacritic | PC: 75/100 (10 reviews); Wii: 83/100 (28 reviews) |

Review scores
| Publication | Score |
|---|---|
| 1Up.com | Wii: B+ |
| Destructoid | Wii: 8.5/10 |
| Eurogamer | Wii: 9/10 |
| GameSpot | PC: 7.5/10 |
| IGN | PC: 8.4/10; Wii: 8.0/10 |
| Nintendo Life | Wii: 9/10 |
| GameFocus | PC: 8.0/10 |

And Yet It Moves received generally favorable reviews. The PC version gained aggregate scores of 71.50% and 75 on GameRankings and Metacritic, respectively, while the Wii version gained aggregate scores of 85.30% and 83. Critics applauded the game's unique take on the platforming genre and the game's paper collage visual style, but felt the game was too short. Some critics noted the absence of any narrative or backstory, but felt that the game ultimately didn't need one, though GameSpot noted it as one of the game's weaknesses.

In his review of the PC version, IGN's Daemon Hatfield stated that And Yet It Moves "manages to make this quarter-century old genre [2D platformer] feel new again." Hatfield praised the gameplay, which was "challenging but avoids being frustrating", but felt there wasn't enough content to warrant the $15 price, despite the additional game modes available. Hatfield scored the game 8.4 out of 10. GameFocus scored the PC version 8.0 out of 10, praising the gameplay, sound, controls, and use of physics. The review also stated that players are unlikely to experience motion sickness despite the frequent rotating of the game screen. GameSpot scored the PC version 7.5 out of 10, stating that while the rotation mechanic "wears thin toward the end of the game," "the increasingly exotic level design manages to keep the good times rolling until the end."

Justin Haywald of 1UP.com stated that "even when I felt I had to guess which direction I was supposed to go, the levels are set up well enough that the way forward is always easy to figure out". Haywald praised the visuals as well, but stated that "as the scenery grows more cluttered, it also sometimes becomes difficult to find a safe place to land after sending the world spinning". Haywald rated And Yet It Moves a B+. NintendoLife rated the Wii version 9 out of 10, stating that the new additions and updated controls made it the "definitive version of the game" despite the omission of online features seen in the PC version.

=== Sales ===
Felix Bohatsch of Broken Rules reported in May 2009 that sales of the PC version were "not at a level we were expecting". No digital rights management (DRM) protection was placed on the game because "we ... believe that any game will be cracked, no matter how we try to protect it, so our philosophy is that adding DRM or anything similar only annoys the people who actually pay for it." The bootlegging rate was approximately 95.5%, meaning "for every game [sold] there are 22 cracked version [sic] being played". Bohatsch speculated that the poor sales were partly caused by the levels demonstrated in the free game demo, which did not focus enough on the game's puzzles. More than 370,000 units of the game were sold as part of the third Humble Indie Bundle.
