= Oxenfree II: Lost Signals =

2023 video game

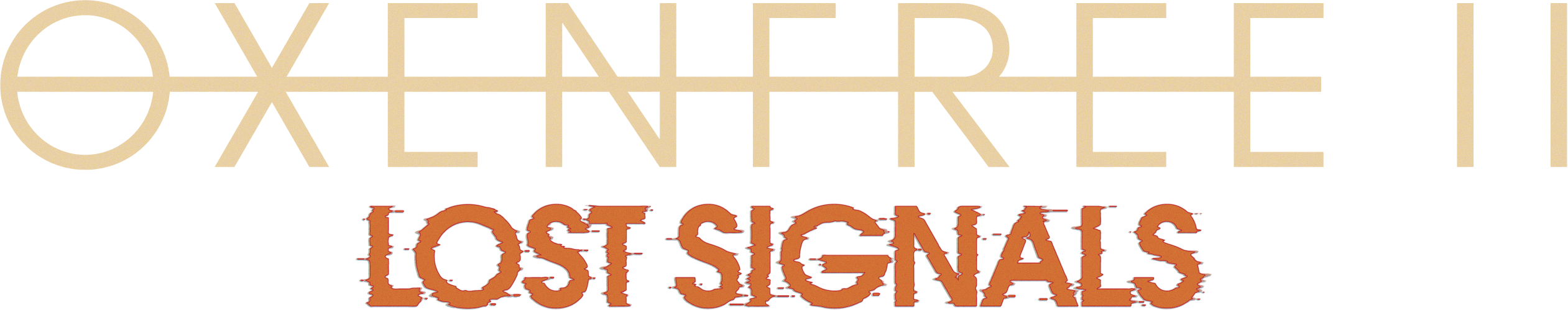
- Developer: Night School Studio
- Publisher: Netflix Games
- Director: Bryant Cannon
- Engine: Unity
- Platforms: Android; iOS; Nintendo Switch; PlayStation 4; PlayStation 5; Windows
- Release: July 12, 2023
- Genre: Graphic adventure
- Mode: Single-player

Oxenfree II: Lost Signals is a supernatural mystery/horror graphic adventure game developed by Night School Studio and published by Netflix Games. The game was released for Android, iOS, Nintendo Switch, PlayStation 4, PlayStation 5 and Windows on July 12, 2023. A sequel to Oxenfree (2016), the game takes place five years after the events of the original game.

== Gameplay ==
Riley chooses from three dialogue options while a rift forms above her in Camena.

Oxenfree II: Lost Signals is a narrative-driven adventure game. While gameplay is similar to Oxenfree, the sequel features new characters, mechanics, and areas. Players control Riley, a 30-something adult who returns to her hometown of Camena for a job. Players navigate the environments via touchscreen or controller.

== Plot ==
Oxenfree II's story stands alone from its predecessor, although knowledge of Oxenfree gives greater context to the events of the game. Five years since their last game, Riley travels to her hometown of Camena Coast, and sets up radio transmitters along the coast to help study radio anomalies. Once Riley and her partner-in-coworker Jacob set up the first radio transmitters, a portal appears above Edwards Island, which is near them. Riley and Jacob start experiencing many hallucinations and time loops. Jacob tells Riley about how he had met an old woman from Edwards Island named Maggie Adler who had studied the anomalies on Edwards Island. Based on that piece of information, Riley and Jacob come up with a plan where they would visit the other three highest points of Camena Coast and build three more radio transmitters, using which they could close the dimensional portal.

Setting up the transmitters, Riley and Jacob encounter three teenagers—Olivia, Charlie, and Violet—who are trying to amplify the portal with old military radio equipment. They are connected with "Parentage," a cult involved with Edwards Island that seems to be appealing to Olivia to help open the portal. When Riley confronts Olivia about her efforts to open the portal, she explains that beings from the portal have promised she can see her deceased parents again if she helps them. At the end of the confrontation, Olivia gets possessed by what turns out to be Alex, the protagonist from the first game. She reveals that she and her friends were trapped by the original rift they opened when they visited the island, and that their desire is to escape.

While the portal appears to close once the transmitters are activated, Alex—through possessing Jacob—tells Riley that the portal had been partially open for some time and entities she refers to as "the Sunken" (the crew of a lost World War II submarine) were communicating with Olivia to convince her to fully open it: while Alex wanted herself and her friends to escape through possessing willing volunteers, the Sunken seek to escape by any means necessary, putting Camena Coast at risk. Alex tells Riley that Olivia is on her way to Edwards Island's communications tower to reopen the portal, and that she needs to be the one to stop her.

Riley and Jacob steal a boat from Camena Harbor, and take it to Edwards Island. Once there, they confront Olivia again who is opening the dimensional portal directly above the communications tower. Riley and Alex both attempt to appeal to Olivia, but Olivia is then possessed by the Sunken, who then possesses Riley. Riley is sent through several surreal hallucinations seemingly in alternate dimensions, and successfully navigates them to a final vision containing Riley's future son, Rex, who in the present timeline she is currently pregnant with. This vision of Rex seeks to convince Riley to believe more in herself and have the confidence she needs to escape being possessed by the Sunken in the void, and shortly afterwards she is transported back to reality, where she manages to stop Olivia and disrupt the formation of the portal.

After the Sunken's efforts are subdued, Jacob, Olivia, Riley and Alex all appear together in front of the portal, where Alex explains that one of them must go inside and tune the portal to close from the inside, trapping them and the Sunken potentially forever but allowing the others to go free. The player can then choose for either Riley, Jacob, or Olivia to enter the portal and close it from the inside, which can change the ending of the story. Regardless of who is chosen, the portal is closed and Camena is saved from the rifts. Alex and her friends are no longer trapped in the dimensional rift, and Alex sends a souvenir box to commemorate Riley (either to Riley's father or Rex depending on the ending) which the player can sift through to get different dialogues and notes based on the choices they made in the character interactions throughout the story.

== Development ==
Night School Studio released the adventure game Oxenfree as their first title in 2016, followed by Afterparty in 2019 and the Apple Arcade-exclusive Next Stop Nowhere in 2020. Studio director Sean Krankel said the studio had an "ah-ha moment" when they decided to return to the setting of Oxenfree, this time through the eyes of an adult, rather than teenagers. Still feeling the effects of the COVID-19 pandemic and looking for greater stability, Night School Studio was acquired by Netflix in 2021, the first game studio acquisition by the streaming company.

Oxenfree II: Lost Signals was announced during Nintendo Indie World Showcase in 2021. Night School Studio originally planned to launch Oxenfree II: Lost Signals in 2021, but the studio delayed the game to 2022 and then to 2023. In April 2023, Night School Studio announced that Oxenfree II: Lost Signals would release for Android, iOS, Nintendo Switch, PlayStation 4, PlayStation 5 and Windows on July 12. The mobile version of the game is available exclusively through Netflix subscription.

At launch, Oxenfree II: Lost Signals features localized interface and subtitle support for 32 languages, a benefit the developers credited to the support provided by Netflix.

== Reception ==
Reception

Aggregate score
| Aggregator | Score |
|---|---|
| Metacritic | (NS) 85/100 (PC) 74/100 (PS5) 79/100 |

Review scores
| Publication | Score |
|---|---|
| Destructoid | 8/10 |
| Digital Trends | 3.5/5 |
| Eurogamer | 4/5 |
| Game Informer | 8/10 |
| GameSpot | 7/10 |
| GamesRadar+ | 2/5 |
| Hardcore Gamer | 4/5 |
| IGN | 7/10 |
| Nintendo Life | 9/10 |
| Nintendo World Report | 9/10 |
| PC Gamer (US) | 85/100 |
| PCGamesN | 8/10 |
| Push Square | 7/10 |
| RPGFan | 88/100 |
| Shacknews | 9/10 |
| The Guardian | 4/5 |
| VideoGamer.com | 9/10 |

Oxenfree II: Lost Signals received "generally favorable" reviews, according to review aggregator Metacritic.

Polygon liked the way Oxenfree II connected to its predecessor, writing, "It's great for fans of the original, but it's also done in a way that means you don't have to play the original Oxenfree". Rock Paper Shotgun praised how the title adapted the coming-of-age story for an older audience, but felt the choices had little impact on the narrative, "unlike the first Oxenfree, these decisions didn't really impact the core of the sequel's story".

Kotaku liked the writing and how each character played off each other, mentioning the two main characters as an example, "Jacob's dynamic with Riley makes their interactions as revealing as they are entertaining". The Verge felt that the game created a enjoyably foreboding atmosphere, "It looks and sounds incredible, and as you get deeper into its mystery, it gets downright creepy, with lots of floating bodies and distorted voices to make it clear that something very wrong is going down".
