= Unhinged (video game) =

2026 interactive horror video game

- Developer: Night School Studio
- Publisher: Netflix
- Engine: Unity
- Release: June 30, 2026
- Genre: Horror
- Mode: Single-player

Unhinged is a 2026 interactive horror game developed by Night School Studio and published by Netflix. It was released on June 30, 2026, through Netflix's cloud gaming service. The game is displayed on a television, with the player's smartphone functioning as both the controller and the protagonist's in-game phone.

== Gameplay ==
Unhinged is a first-person narrative horror game in which the player guides Ava, a woman trapped in her apartment building during a hurricane while being pursued by a killer. Rather than controlling Ava directly, the player uses a smartphone to select routes, aim a flashlight, answer calls, receive text messages, and make timed decisions. The game is designed to be completed in less than an hour and includes different routes and outcomes.

== Premise ==
During a Category 5 hurricane, Ava becomes trapped inside her apartment building. Her main connection to the outside world is her best friend Claire, who lives across the street and communicates with her by phone. As Ava attempts to escape the building, she discovers that a killer is pursuing her.

Zoë Kravitz voices Ava, Sadie Sink voices Claire, and Troy Baker voices Ben the killer.

== Development and release ==
Night School Studio originally conceived Unhinged as a more traditional horror game based around the use of a flashlight. During development, the studio redesigned the project for Netflix's television-based cloud gaming platform, simplifying its controls and using the player's smartphone as the protagonist's phone. The developers intended the game to be accessible to people unfamiliar with conventional video-game controls and designed its short running time to resemble an episode of a television series.

Netflix released Unhinged on June 30, 2026, making it available to subscribers through its gaming service.

== Reception ==
Elie Gould of PC Gamer praised the performances of Kravitz, Sink, and Baker and described the game as a pleasant point-and-click horror experience, but criticized the smartphone controls and its approximately 30-minute length.

Aaron Boehm of Bloody Disgusting gave the game three out of five skulls. He praised the use of the phone as an immersive storytelling device but felt that the short running time limited the story and character development.
