= Bit Boy!! =

2009 video game

- Developer: Bplus
- Publishers: NA/EU: Bplus; JP: Marvelous Entertainment
- Platform: Wii (WiiWare)
- Release: EU: July 3, 2009; NA: July 13, 2009; JP: March 30, 2010
- Genre: Action
- Mode: Single-player

Bit Boy!! is an action video game developed by Austrian studio Bplus for Nintendo's WiiWare service. It was released in Europe on July 3, 2009, North America on July 13, 2009, and in Japan on March 30, 2010 as Bit Man!! (ビットマン, Bitto Man) by Marvelous Entertainment.

== Gameplay ==
Players control a cube named Kubi, who they must navigate through a series of increasingly complex mazes in order to rescue his friends. Players must also avoid monsters that roam the mazes, though later in the game they are given a limited ability to attack them.

The game's levels are spread across the setting of several "Bit Generations", which are generally representative of video game console generations. Each Bit Generation sees changes in graphics, sound and level design that are intended to invoke the aesthetics of the games from that particular generation, however in general the gameplay remains the same throughout.

These Bit Generations, presented in the game as fictional installments of a series of Bit Boy games, include:

- Bit Boy, representative of second generation-era games
- Bit Boy 2, representative of third generation-era games
- Super Bit Boy, representative of fourth generation-era games
- Bit Boy 3D, representative of early fifth generation-era games
- Bit Boy 64, representative of late fifth generation-era games
- Bit Boy Wii, representative of sixth and seventh generation-era games

The game is played using with the Wii Remote held sideways or held upright to simulate an arcade joystick. After completing a Bit Generation, the score attack-based "Warp Mode" is unlocked for that particular era. Beating the last level of the game in either Classic Mode or Warp Mode allows the player to play through all levels again in the Turbo Classic Mode and Turbo Warp Mode respectively.

== Development ==
With Bit Boy!!, Bplus wanted the game to "spark true retro feelings in all gamers, regardless of age", which led to it being set across multiple video game generations. The first three Bit Generations feature increasingly detailed 2D graphics (including the use of the authentic NES color palette in Bit Boy 2), the latter generations evolve from using simple polygonal shapes and blurry textures to complex models and sharp photo realistic textures to illustrate the evolution of the three-dimensional visuals.

== Reception ==
Reception

Aggregate score
| Aggregator | Score |
|---|---|
| Metacritic | 47/100 |

Review scores
| Publication | Score |
|---|---|
| IGN | 5.5/10 |
| Nintendo Life | 5/10 |
| Official Nintendo Magazine | 31% |

The game received "generally unfavorable reviews" according to the review aggregation website Metacritic.

== Sequels ==
On February 15, 2012, a sequel to Bit Boy!! was announced. It is titled Bit Boy!! Arcade and was released on April 17, 2014 for the Nintendo 3DS, via the eShop.
