= Secrets of Rætikon =

Video game published by Broken Rules

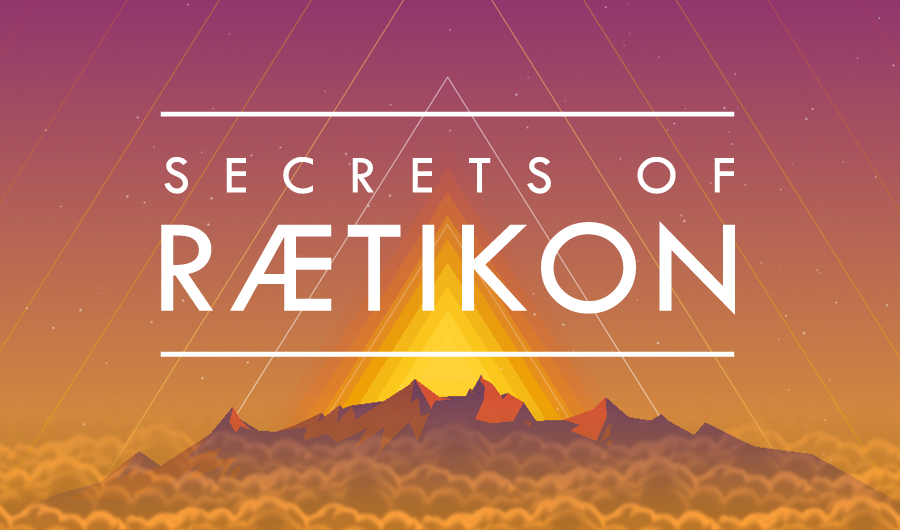
- Developer: Broken Rules
- Publisher: Broken Rules
- Platforms: Windows, OS X, Linux
- Release: April 17, 2014
- Genre: Action-adventure
- Mode: Single-player

Secrets of Rætikon is an action-adventure open world video game developed and published by Broken Rules. The player controls a bird and must explore the environment of Rætikon to find its secrets. Game elements include animals with specific behaviors and ancient puzzles. Development began in 2011 and the game was formally announced in July 2013 and followed by alpha and Steam Early Access releases. Secrets of Rætikon was released on April 17, 2014 for Windows, OS X, and Linux platforms. It received mixed reviews from reviewers, who praised its artwork and movement physics, but criticized its inconsistency, lack of cohesion, and technical issues.

== Gameplay ==
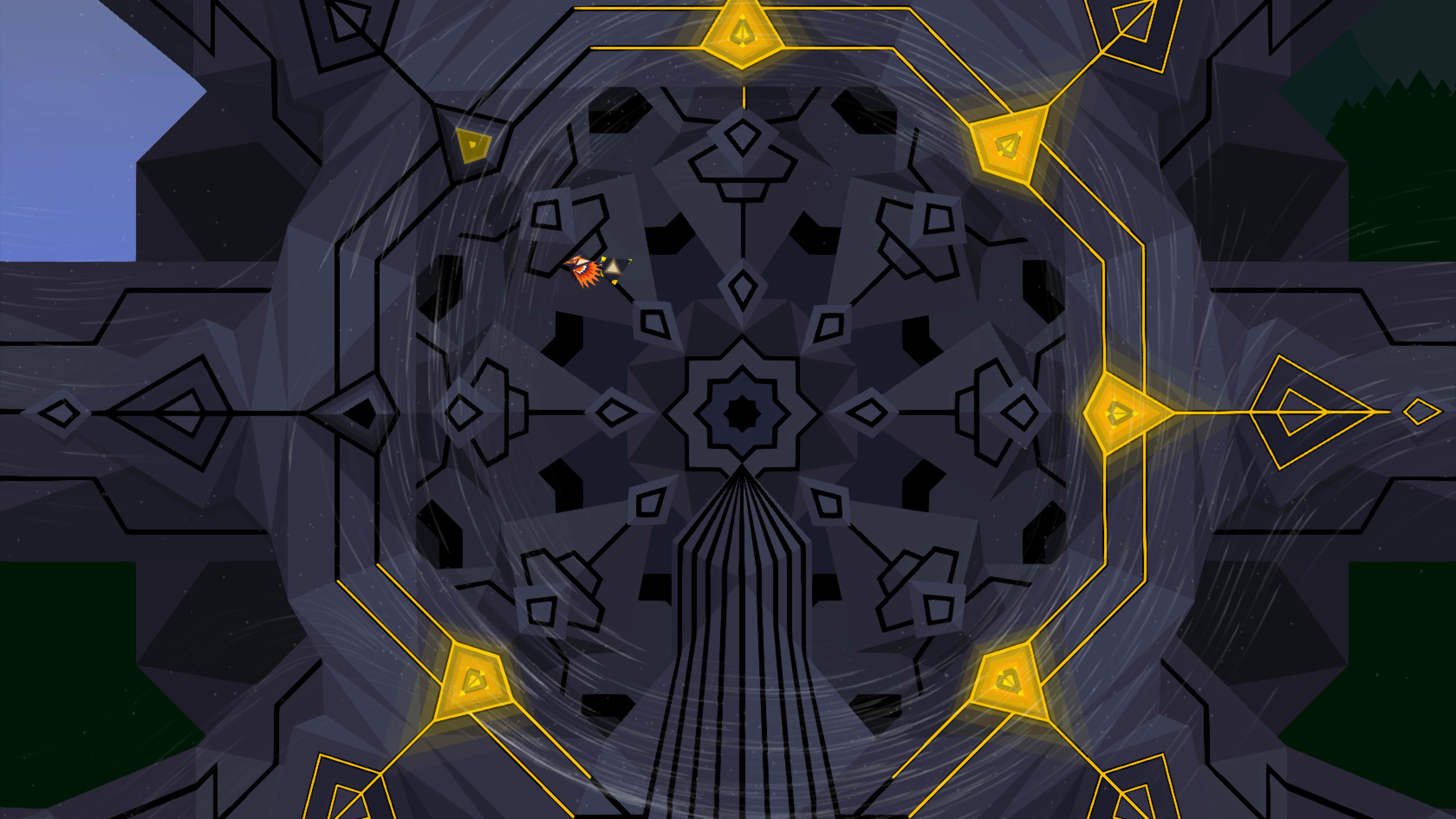
These screenshots of gameplay show the scale of the player-character in the interactive environment. The second image shows the ancient device associated with the game's key objectives.

Secrets of Rætikon is a single-player, story-driven, open world sandbox action-adventure video game. The player-character takes form of a bird. The player controls the bird with three buttons: one that flaps its wings, another that takes items into the bird's beak, and another that makes bird sounds. While the game can be played through keyboard and mouse, the developers instead recommend a controller.

The objective is to fly through the Rætikon environment to find its titular secrets, namely by collecting relics to power an ancient device. The environment is split into themed levels such as swamp, lagoon, mountaintops, and forests. Glowing shards are dispersed throughout each level, which can be collected and redeemed at an altar within each themed level for a glowing relic. These relics can be returned to where the player started the game to power a mysterious, ancient device. The player-character carries the relics past aggressive enemies and treacherous environment, and completes puzzles of reconstructing animal statues from its pieces to access new levels. Each level features different animals and contain environmental objects that player can interact with.

== Development ==
Rætikon was first announced in July 2013, though its development began in 2011. The game's Viennese developer and publisher, Broken Rules, had previously worked on the 2012 Wii U game Chasing Aurora, which itself was based on a multiplayer prototype for Rætikon. The game is partly based on an Alps region culture conquered by the Roman Empire. Its visuals were inspired by dream-like flying sensations. In an effort to increase the game's replay value, the developers emphasized its artificial intelligence, physics, and interactive qualities, including animal-specific behaviors and strippable plant foliage.

Broken Rules released an alpha version of the game in October 2013. Around the same time, they announced an Indiegogo crowdfunding campaign in lieu of searching for a publisher. The game later entered Steam Early Access. Rætikon was released on April 17, 2014 for Windows, OS X, and Linux platforms via Steam, the Mac App Store, and the Humble Store. The Steam edition of the game supports Steam Workshop with a level editor for users to build and share original content.

== Reception ==
Reception

Aggregate score
Aggregator	Score
Metacritic	58/100

Review scores
Publication	Score
Eurogamer	6/10
Joystiq	3.5/5
Hardcore Gamer	2/5

The game received "mixed or average reviews", according to video game review score aggregator Metacritic. Reviewers praised the game's artwork and movement physics, but criticized its lack of cohesion. Some appreciated the moments where the game's elements coalesced. They estimated the game to run between two and three hours in length.

Joystiq's Sam Prell said that the adventure felt restrictive and linear, "like a guided tour". He wrote that Rætikon's map design encourages players to think methodically about their path rather than to explore the game as a non-linear open world. In this way, he felt that its gameplay philosophies contradicted. Hardcore Gamer's Geoff Thew wrote that the game "commits a number of fundamental design sins" as one of "few games so ceaselessly tiring to play". He felt that the animals who steal the game objectives created "busywork", and complained of copious backtracking and the "straight up discourteous" exclusion of an in-game map. Eurogamer's Jon Denton added that numerous "extremely irritating conflicts" with off-screen animals hurt the game's pacing. He noted its gameplay influence from Fez and compared its blue shards game mechanics to that of Dark Souls. Denton did not feel that the game deserved the amount of effort it required of its players to understand its story. Reviewers noted technical issues and glitches within the game. Prell noted issues in the game's physics and game save features. As Rætikon does not support manual saves, he frequently found his progress automatically saved while his player-character was stuck in the environment. Thew of Hardcore Gamer found similar physics glitches that trapped him in the environment, which led him to use his keyboard alongside the Xbox 360 controller to circumvent controller compatibility issues.

When mentioning the game's art style, most reviewers gave positive response. Denton described the style as a "beautifully drawn, angular 2D world". Prell wrote that Rætikon's triangle-based art style made its characters feel like papercraft and gave the game "a sense of reverence and spirituality" when complemented by the story, and gave comparison to Shadow of the Colossus. Thew gave similar response noting that it is reminiscent of Origami. However, Thew continued to state that while the visuals were "distinctive", the game's "alpine" area was "clichéd and predictable" and its "good looks and smooth movement mechanics" did not compensate for the rest of the game's design. He found the game "shallow", uninteresting, and "a disappointment ... on almost every level". Denton of Eurogamer praised the moments where he figured out how to find a shard or alphabet piece, but ultimately found Rætikon "awkward", with "substance did not live up to its style", and causing unjustified and unreasonable frustration.
