= Bit Boy!! Arcade =

Video game for the Nintendo 3DS

- Developer: Bplus
- Publisher: Bplus
- Platform: Nintendo 3DS
- Release: NA: April 17, 2014; EU: April 24, 2014
- Genre: Action
- Mode: Single-player

Bit Boy!! Arcade is an action video game developed by Austrian indie studio Bplus for Nintendo 3DS' eShop service. It was released in the United States on April 17, 2014, and in Europe on April 24, 2014. It is a sequel to the 2009 released Bit Boy!! for Nintendo's WiiWare service and the second installment of the Bit Boy!! series. It uses a 3D, isometric playing field, with polygon characters.

According to Bplus, two more sequels would be released in an undefined future.

== Gameplay ==
Players control a red cube named Kubi (from Greek: κύβος (kubos)), who they must navigate through a series of worlds. The game follows the principle of rescuing Kubi's friends and avoid monsters that roam the levels.

The main goal in each phase, each level consists of 10 normal and 10 action phases, is to rescue seven of Kubi's friends.

The publisher denoted the game with the terms "Hide + Seek", "Avoid + Collect" and "Action + Puzzle". Each level is based on a square floor plan. On this grid-like basis Kubi is moved. The camera is oriented isometric. The players define how fast Kubi is moving by pressing the control pad and the buttons at the same time. Depending on how fast they are pressed Kubi moves fast or slow. The game uses the 3DS featured play coins to give the player the ability to purchase continues like it would be in a real arcade machine.

== Plot ==
=== Characters ===
ZeLeLi is a mighty gearwheel-shaped being created out of the essence of our dying sun 7 billion years in the future. ZeLeLi is the origin of time, life and light, so it possesses power over these universal forces. Travelling through time and space, ZeLeLi spreads the seed of life and light in all time in the whole universe. Its counterpart is the black Shadow Plättchen. Forcefully cut out of the negative space of a black hole, the black Shadow Plättchen represents exactly the opposite of ZeLeLi. Like the ZeLeLi, Plättchen is not limited within the constrains of time and space. Wherever it comes along it spreads massive havoc. Central to the plot of the game are two main characters, the game's hero Kubi and the game designer Bernd. He appears as a through the air floating pixel head and talks to Kubi during the game's sequences.

=== Story ===
At the beginning of the game Kubi gets killed by a monster created by the black Shadow Plättchen. Bernd is devastated and pleads ZeLeLi for help. ZeLeLi turns back the time and gives Kubi and Bernd the ability to speak to each other. In the meantime Bernd deleted the game in which Kubi died to create another one in whom his hero doesn't have to suffer this fate. Kubi thinks that Bernd is the one who has kidnapped all of his friends and refuses to be the hero unless Bernd designs the game exactly like Kubi wants it to be. As the story continues it is hinted that Bernd, even if he is the developer of the game, is not almighty. The Shadow Plättchen gained power by killing small fairies called Pixel Flies and by kidnapping their king. With this power they got the ability to take influence on the game. So Kubi and Bernd are forced to work together to save Kubi's friends and the game itself.

== Development ==
Bit Boy!! Arcade was produced by Bplus. The first announcement was made via press release on February 16, 2012, stating that the game was halfway done. A first playable demo was shown at E3 2012.

=== Bit Boy!! Arcade 2 ===
Bplus announced that a reimagining of Bit Boy!! Arcade was in development for the Nintendo Switch 2 on April 16, 2025. A release date has yet to be announced.

== Reception ==
Reception

Aggregate score
Aggregator	Score
Metacritic	53/100

Review scores
Publication	Score
Hardcore Gamer	2/5
Nintendo Life	4/10
Nintendo World Report	8/10
Official Nintendo Magazine	57%

The game received mixed reviews according to the review aggregation website Metacritic. Nintendo Life praised the overworld, saying it was one of the most interesting on the gaming history; they also said it had an excellent soundtrack, but criticized the gameplay as broken and hard to play.
