= Duncan the Wonder Dog =

Graphic novel by Adam Hines

Duncan the Wonder Dog is a graphic novel by Adam Hines. It is the winner of a Xeric Grant and the 2011 Lynd Ward Graphic Novel Prize. It also came in first for the 2010 ComicsAlliance list of the year's best comics. Duncan the Wonder Dog has garnered generally positive reviews since its release, with The New York Times calling it "ambitious, beautiful, [and] mystifying."

It is the first of a planned nine-book series, as frequently stated in interviews at the time of its release.

== Volumes ==
Duncan the Wonder Dog Show One (400 pages, AdHouse Books, November 9, 2010)

== See also ==
- Xeric Grant Winners
- Los Angeles Times Book Prize
