= Morgue file =

Post-production materials for use of reference, or an inactive job file

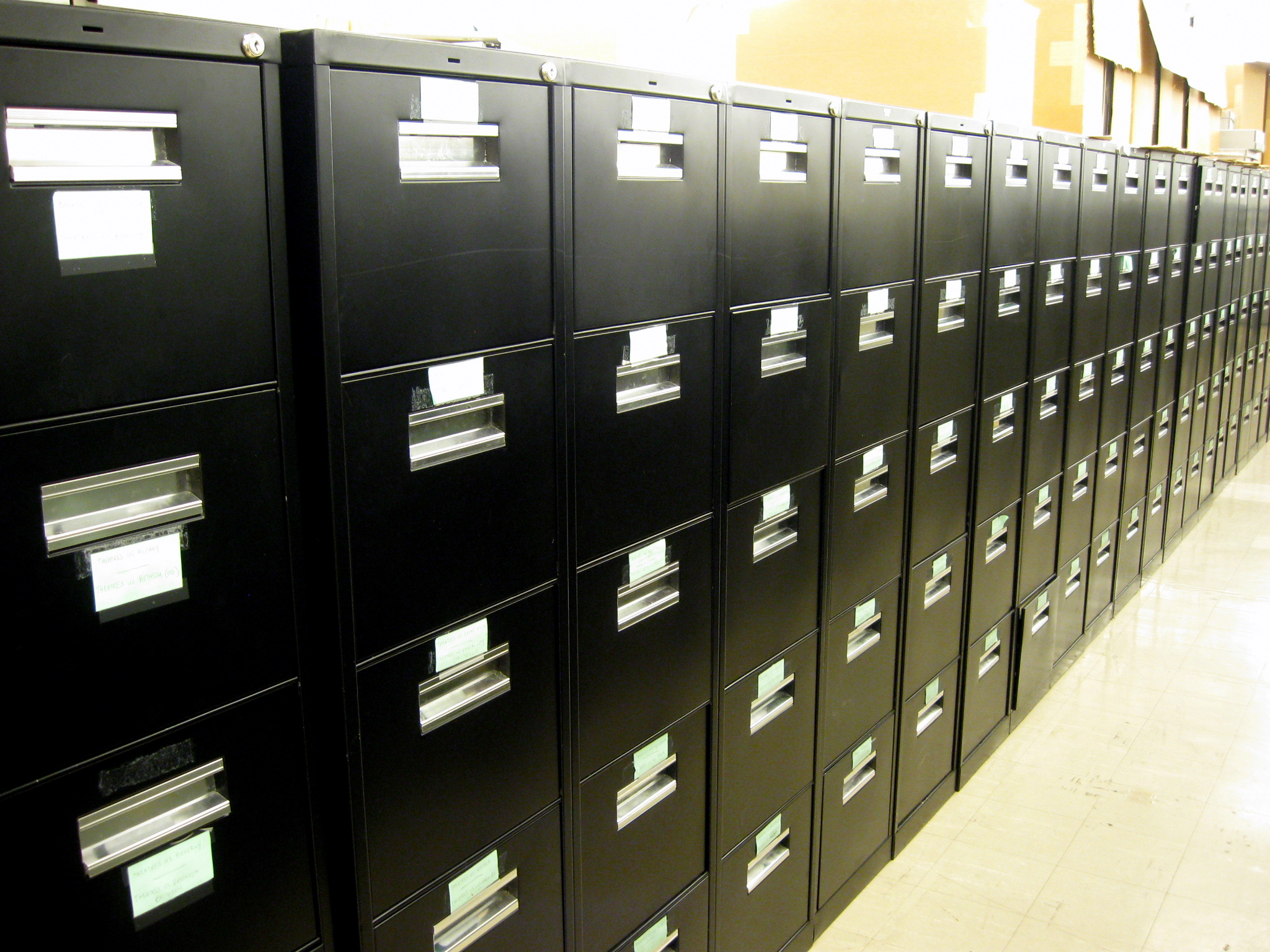
Cabinets containing a small portion of the many clipping files at the New York Public Library for the Performing Arts

A morgue file originally was a collection of paper folders containing old files and notes kept by criminal investigators, as well as old article clippings kept by newspaper reporters, in case they became of later use as a quick reference collection.

In modern usage, its scope has expanded to cover many post-production materials for use of reference, or an inactive job file. The term is popular in the newspaper business to describe the file that holds past issues flats. The term has also been used by illustrators, comic book artists, designers and teachers.

The newspaper magnate William Randolph Hearst forbade his papers from keeping a morgue file on him.

Artist Doug Wildey was known for his huge morgue file of photo references. He became so adept at depicting actual people, that it becomes an ancillary enjoyment trying to identify the celebrities' cameo appearances in his artwork.
