= Gibbon: Beyond the Trees =

2022 video game

- Developer: Broken Rules
- Publisher: Broken Rules
- Directors: Felix Bohatsch; Clemens Scott
- Producer: Josef Who
- Programmers: Eddy Boxerman; Vivien Schreiber; Peter Vorlaufer; Stefan Kernjak; Jan Hackl
- Artists: Catherine Unger; Kitt Byrne; Vivien Schreiber; Clemens Scott; Simon Griesser
- Composer: Andrew 'scntfc' Rohrmann
- Engine: Unity
- Platforms: iOS; macOS; tvOS; Nintendo Switch; Windows; PlayStation 4; PlayStation 5
- Release: iOS, macOS, tvOS; February 25, 2022; Nintendo Switch; May 11, 2022; Windows; May 18, 2022; PS4, PS5; June 1, 2023
- Genres: Adventure, Platform
- Mode: Single-player

Gibbon: Beyond the Trees is a 2022 adventure game developed and published by Broken Rules. It was released for Apple Arcade on iOS, macOS, and tvOS on February 25, 2022, and for the Nintendo Switch and on Windows in May the same year. The game was released for PlayStation 4 and PlayStation 5 on June 1, 2023.

The game features 2D hand-drawn visuals and is described as an ecological adventure. It follows a lost gibbon as they embark on a dangerous journey into unknown lands, searching for home. It is heavily informed by and based on real-world ecological issues, and was made in collaboration with Southeast Asian locals and experts.

== Gameplay ==
Gibbon: Beyond the Trees is a side-scrolling platformer and carries characteristics of an endless runner. The player controls a gibbon embarking on a perilous journey through a jungle, brachiating at high speed, building momentum, pulling off somersaults, and launching themselves higher and further into the air.

Holding down the right trigger on a gamepad (or right arrow key on a keyboard) will propel the primate forward into an automatic swinging motion, building momentum, while pressing the left trigger (or left arrow key) sees them break into a slower run. On a down slope one can slide even faster. Releasing the button at the right time at the end of a branch or slope launches the player across the forest's wide gaps. Pulling off a backflip while in the air and hitting another button provides a speed boost once they're swinging or sliding again. The game also introduces an assist move later on, where the player is flung forward by another gibbon if they manage to meet in the air. Meanwhile the player has to avoid various dangers, like forest fires and poachers, or be returned to a checkpoint before the obstacle.

The game features three different modes. The short story mode, to keep emphasis on the narrative, avoids things like points, scores, collectibles and a timer. The endless mode, called "liberation mode", has the player rescue caged animals and race to freedom through a procedurally generated jungle. In a later update a daily run mode was added, which has the player try to cover as much distance as possible in a given time frame.

== Development ==
The idea for the game came from Broken Rules' CEO, Felix Bohatsch, who liked gibbons. After visiting the zoo with his kids, watching the animals move, and learning more about them, he wanted to emulate the brachiation of the animals.

Bohatsch made a prototype in 2018 together with co-founder Peter Vorlaufer, inspired by endless runners like Alto's Adventure and Canabalt, but it was "too physical and simulation heavy", so they put it into the back drawer. Months later the team was asked by Apple to make something for Apple Arcade, prompting them to revisit the game and start full production. Apple also came on as producers and helped fund it. Bohatsch further explored the idea together with creative director Clemens Scott, and with the help of office-mate and animator Sascha Vernik they created an animation mockup. Meanwhile, realizing that the movement simulation was quite complex, they got help from Wolfire Games' David Rosen, who delivered his own prototype.

Doing more research on the animals, Bohatsch and Scott discovered that gibbons were very endangered and their habitat was being destroyed, so it was clear to them that they couldn't make a game of pure escapism. They decided on two core themes: swinging through the jungle, and a focus on environmental consciousness.

One of the challenges for the team was portraying the world in which gibbons live in a truthful and respectful manner. As they had never been to Southeast Asia before, they wanted to travel there, but due to budget and schedule constraints, as well as the COVID-19 pandemic, that was hardly possible. Instead they connected with NGOs in the area such as the Thailand-based Gibbon Rehabilitation Project, which they worked with during development, learning more about the animals and the problems they face, like poaching driven by tourism. From Rainforest Rescue the team learned a lot about deforestation, worldwide, but specifically in Borneo. They also talked to Bruno Manser Fonds about indigenous people there and hired a cultural liaison expert to make sure they were portraying the people and culture of Southeast Asia respectfully. Additionally, they got in touch with Werner Boote, an Austrian documentarian, about dealing with difficult topics in entertainment products and working with NGOs.

The game was the biggest, in terms of team size and budget, that Broken Rules had worked on up until that point. Together with a very remote team, exacerbated by the Covid-19 pandemic, this added an organisational challenge to development. The team consisted of up to 14 people, about half of which were based in Vienna, with the rest being in other cities and countries. Art director Catherine Unger and main artist Kitt Byrne for instance resided in London. Canadian developer Eddy Boxerman of Hemisphere Games contributed to the physics and animation of the game. The music was composed by Andrew 'scntfc' Rohrmann and Vienna based game-audio studio Wobblersound did the sound design and audio implementation. Development took three years, and another one for porting it to consoles.

The game was announced on February 1, 2022, and a demo was part of the Steam Next Fest the same month. It was later released for Apple Arcade on iOS, macOS, and tvOS on February 25, 2022, for the Nintendo Switch on May 11, 2022, and on Windows and macOS via Steam and itch.io a week later, on May 18, 2022. Since then it has received several updates, adding daily runs and an encyclopedia with more unlockable real world information.

== Reception ==
Reception

Aggregate score
Aggregator	Score
Metacritic	Switch: 63/100 (9 reviews)

Review scores
Publication	Score
Nintendo World Report	Switch: 5/10
The Guardian	Switch: 3/5

Gibbon: Beyond the Trees received mixed or average ratings, scoring 63 out of 100 on Metacritic, with reviewers praising its beautiful visuals and ecological message, but being divided on its controls, short length and repetitive gameplay. Some also reported performance issues on the Nintendo Switch version, noting a stuttering frame rate in some areas.

=== Awards ===
The game won several awards, namely the Apple Design Award for 'Social Impact', the 'International Award' at Bitsummit 2022, the Digital Viking Award 2023 for 'Best Art Style', the 2022 Pedagogic Media Award in Germany, and a Webby Award for 'Social Impact' in the games category.

It also earned a number of nominations, such as for 'Game Beyond Entertainment' at the 2023 BAFTA Games Awards, 'Mobile Game of the Year' at the 2023 D.I.C.E. Awards, and the 'Visual Design Award' at IndieCade.
