= Old Man's Journey =

2017 video game

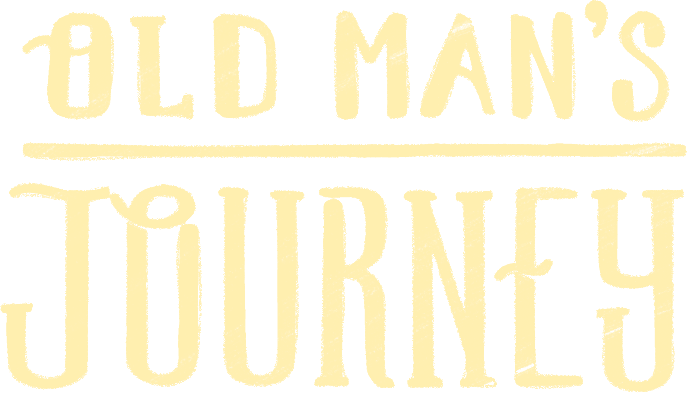
- Developer: Broken Rules
- Publisher: Broken Rules
- Directors: Felix Bohatsch, Clemens Scott
- Programmers: Jan Hackl, Stefan Kernjak
- Artists: Clemens Scott, Brian Main, Lip Comarella
- Composer: scntfc
- Engine: Unity
- Platforms: Android, iOS, macOS, Windows, Nintendo Switch, PlayStation 4, Xbox One
- Release: Android, iOS, macOS, Windows; 18 May 2017; Nintendo Switch; 20 February 2018; PlayStation 4; 29 May 2018; Xbox One; 4 March 2019
- Modes: Single-player, multiplayer

Old Man's Journey is an adventure video game developed and published by Broken Rules. The game was released for Android, iOS, macOS and Windows in 2017, the Nintendo Switch and PlayStation 4 in 2018 and the Xbox One in 2019.

The game follows the trip of an old man, who starts to travel after receiving a letter containing some news. Throughout the game, some semi-still flashbacks explain the past life of the man.

== Gameplay ==
The player using the cursor in order to move a hill

The player controls an old man using the mouse, clicking where they want him to move (tapping on mobile). To allow the character to progress, the player must click and drag hillocks (swipe on mobile) to modify the landscape, adjusting their height - except where the man is standing - within a certain limit. When the edges of the hillocks fit, the old man may then pass from one to the other - even if one is in the foreground and the other is in the background. Sometimes, additional items are part of the puzzles (such as sheep), which must be moved to let the old man pass. The old man conducts his journey on foot for the most part, but other means of transport are sometimes used. In this case, the player may need to solve some environmental puzzles to allow them to progress. At times, the old man will sit down to rest, and the player must find an item in the scenery that will trigger a memory in him, initiating a flashback and allowing the player to progress. Much of the old man's story is told through these flashbacks, which consist of short, single-shot animations (such as a man looking at a house in the rain) and eschew dialogue altogether.

== Reception ==
Reception

Aggregate score
Aggregator	Score
Metacritic	iOS: 86/100; PC: 76/100; NS: 73/100

Review scores
Publication	Score
Destructoid	8/10
Game Informer	8/10
Nintendo Life	7/10
Nintendo World Report	7.5/10
Pocket Gamer	4/5
Polygon	8/10
TouchArcade	5/5

The game received "generally favorable" reviews, according to Metacritic, a video game review aggregator.

=== Accolades ===
Year	Awards	Category	Result	Ref.
2018	Bolognaragazzi	Digital Award	Won	
2018	Emotional Games Award	Best Artistic Achievement	Won	
2018	Game Developers Choice Awards	Best Mobile Game	Honorable Mentions	
2018	Google Indie Games Contest		Runner Up	
2018	Google Indie Games Contest	Unity Award	Won	
2018	Taipei Game Show	Best Visual Arts	Won	
2018	Taipei Game Show	Grand Prix	Won	
2017	The Game Awards 2017	Best Mobile Game	Nominated	
2017	Apple iPad Game of the Year		Won	
2017	Apple Design Awards		Won	
2017	IGN Best of 2017	Best Mobile game	Nominated	
2017	AzPlay	Best Visual Art	Won	
2017	Busan Indie Connect Festival	Excellence in Art	Won	
2017	BIG Festival	Best Art Award	Won	
2017	BIG Festival	Innovation Award	Won	
2017	Golden Joystick Awards	Mobile Game of the Year	Nominated	
2017	Independent Games Festival	Excellence in Visual Arts	Finalist	
2017	Indie Plus Awards		1st Runner Up	
2017	Sense of Wonder Night	Best Art	Won	
2017	TapTap Game Awards	Best Audio	Won	
2017	TapTap Game Awards	Best Indie Game	Honorable Mentions	
2017	TapTap Game Awards	Best Narrative	Won	
2017	TapTap Game Awards	Best Visual Art	Won	
2016	IndieCade Europe	Media Choice Award	Won	
