= Broken Rules =

Austrian video game developer and publisher

Broken Rules Interactive Media GmbH
- Company type: Private
- Industry: Video games
- Founded: April 23, 2009; 16 years ago
- Founder: Felix Bohatsch; Jan Hackl; Peter Vorlaufer; Martin Pichlmair; Clemens Scott
- Headquarters: Vienna, Austria
- Products: And Yet It Moves; Chasing Aurora; Eloh; Gibbon: Beyond the Trees; Old Man's Journey; Secrets of Raetikon
- Website: brokenrul.es

Broken Rules Interactive Media GmbH is an Austrian independent video game developer, publisher, and creative collective based in Vienna. It was founded in 2009 by Peter Vorlaufer, Jan Hackl, and Felix Bohatsch, and is known for critically acclaimed and award-winning games such as And Yet It Moves, Secrets of Raetikon and Old Man's Journey, as well as a number of game ports to Nintendo's Wii U.

== History ==
Broken Rules was initially formed by Felix Bohatsch, Jan Hackl and Peter Vorlaufer in 2009, and coincided with the release of their first title, puzzle-platformer And Yet It Moves. The game's prototype began as a bachelor project held by the Department for Design and Assessment at the Vienna University of Technology in 2007, and gained international recognition when it won the 'Student Showcase Award' at the 12th Annual Independent Games Festival.

During the launch of And Yet It Moves, Broken Rules merged with one half of their indie friends and office neighbors studio radiolaris, Martin Pichlmair. Visual artist Clemens Scott joined the company at the same time. After the merger, the team started working on an in-house engine and their next game.

Chasing Aurora started out as a bird-flying racing game prototype in late 2010. The developers were approached by Nintendo in mid-2011 to make a launch title for the Wii U, where it released on November 18, 2012. They then returned to its single-player campaign, and in 2013 announced it as its own game, Secrets of Raetikon. Instead of turning to a publisher they secured additional funding through a crowdfunding campaign on IndieGoGo, launched an alpha phase, entered an open alpha phase on Steam Early Access some time later and finally released the full game for PC, Mac and Linux on April 17, 2014.

After Secrets of Raetikon released, the team was on the verge of closure, which brought them to restructure the company and start to pick up work for hire. Leveraging their experience with the Wii U, they ported a range of games to Nintendo's console, namely Guacamelee! Super Turbo Championship Edition, Apple Design Award winner Blek and Electronic Super Joy. Additionally, individual team members collaborated on smaller projects with independent developers around the globe. During this time, DeNA hired Broken Rules to port And Yet It Moves to iOS, released in 2015 with the shortened name Yet It Moves, though it was later removed from the App Store.

Broken Rules' next game, Old Man's Journey, started development in early 2015, and was released for iOS, Android and PC on May 17, 2017. The game follows the trip of an old man, who starts to travel after receiving a letter containing some news. Throughout the game, semi-still flashbacks explain the past life of the man. Old Man's Journey went on to win numerous awards. In the following two years the game was also ported to all major console platforms.

After that, together with jcstranger and Salon Alpin, they developed Eloh, a chilled out puzzle game, and published it on October 11, 2018, for iOS and Android. The game received generally favorable reviews, and was praised for its visuals and audio design. It won 'Excellence in Audio' at the 15th International Mobile Gaming Awards, and an Apple Design Award in June 2019.

Gibbon: Beyond the Trees, the studio's latest title, released on February 25, 2022, on Apple Arcade, followed by the Nintendo Switch and Steam in May. The short ecological adventure game follows a gibbon on a dangerous journey and highlights the effects of real world issues such as deforestation, and poaching driven by tourism. During its development in times of the COVID-19 pandemic Broken Rules was in contact with various NGOs to learn more about these things. The game went on to win various awards, such as the Apple Design Award for 'Social Impact'. It was also nominated for 'Game Beyond Entertainment' at the 2023 BAFTA Games Awards, 'Mobile Game of the Year' at the 2023 D.I.C.E. Awards, and the 'Visual Design Award' at IndieCade.

Aside from making games, the studio has co-organized zamSpielen in Vienna from 2011 onwards, a series of irregular ludic exhibition events, meant to bring video games into a public spotlight.

Broken Rules sponsors Krita.

== Games developed ==
Year	Title	Platform(s)
2009	And Yet It Moves	Windows, macOS, Linux, Wii, iOS
2012	Chasing Aurora	Wii U
2014	Secrets of Raetikon	Windows, macOS, Linux
2017	Old Man's Journey	Android, iOS, macOS, Windows, Nintendo Switch, PlayStation 4, Xbox One
2018	Eloh	iOS, Android
2022	Gibbon: Beyond the Trees	Windows, macOS, iOS, Nintendo Switch, Apple TV
