= Afterparty (video game) =

2019 video game

- Developer: Night School Studio
- Publisher: Night School Studio
- Platforms: Mac, Windows, PlayStation 4, Xbox One, Nintendo Switch, Linux
- Release: Mac, PS4, Windows, Xbox One: WW: October 29, 2019; Switch: WW: March 6, 2020
- Genre: Adventure
- Mode: Single-player

Afterparty is an adventure video game by Night School Studio for macOS, PlayStation 4, Microsoft Windows, and Xbox One platforms in October 2019 and Nintendo Switch in March 2020. Set in hell, themed as a college town, the player navigates conversations and tries to outdrink Satan with the goal of returning two best friends from the afterlife.

== Plot ==
Lifelong friends and recent college graduates Milo and Lola find themselves in Hell, with no recollection of how they came to be there. After being assigned a Personal Demon, Sister Mary Wormhorn, they meet Sam, a psychopomp cab driver. Sam explains that while demons torture humans during work hours, both groups enjoy the nights drinking and partying together. The only way out of Hell is to outdrink and out-party Satan himself. After procuring an invite to Lucifer's party, Milo and Lola meet the host himself, who demands they prove their abilities by obtaining seals of approval from his brothers and sisters, the Monarchs of Hell.

One of the Monarchs is Apollyon, a judge of the Dead. Milo and Lola sneak into a demons-only bar to find her. Apollyon sees through their disguises and agrees to give them a seal if they serve as lawyers for Roberto, a soul charged with serial murder. Milo and Lola can either throw the trial per Apollyon's wishes, or let Roberto ascend to heaven and challenge Apollyon afterward; either way, Apollyon will give the pair her seal.

Another Monarch is the hard-partying Asmodeus, who is trying to forget about his recent breakup with his ex, Beth. Milo and Lola can either get Asmodeus and Beth back together or beat Asmodeus in a dance-off to obtain the necessary seal.

Having obtained the needed seals, Milo and Lola return to Satan's party, with a team of challengers drawn from the people they have befriended during the night. Apollyon attempts an intervention, feeling that Satan's drinking is out of control and Hell is suffering because of it, but Satan angrily teleports Milo and Lola away to continue the drinking contest.

The game has multiple endings, depending on Milo and Lola's performance in the drinking game. If they win, they are sent back to Earth and resume their lives. If they lose the contest or refuse to play, they remain in Hell. Some time afterward, Milo and Lola relax at a bar and discuss the current situation; depending on the player's actions, Satan can be recovering from his addictions or have fallen off the wagon, but Hell appears to be running better. Sam bursts in, having discovered another way to possibly escape Hell, to which Milo and Lola immediately agree.

== Development and release ==
Developer Night School Studio released their first game, Oxenfree, in 2016. The game used the walk and talk mechanic to deliver story without cutscenes. After the successful release of Oxenfree, Night School Studio worked on a Mr. Robot game, and was approached by Telltale Games to work on a new project based on Stranger Things. Ultimately, Telltale closed with no warning, and Night School Studio was left in a precarious financial position. Fortunately, the developers had another project in development, Afterparty.

Afterparty reportedly benefited from the demise of the Stranger Things game because the former game absorbed talent from the latter.

Afterparty was announced in 2017.

== Reception ==
Reception

Aggregate scores
Aggregator	Score
Metacritic	PC: 75/100; PS4: 70/100; XONE: 75/100; NS: 74/100
OpenCritic	63% recommend

Review scores
Publication	Score
Eurogamer	Recommended
GameSpot	7/10
GamesRadar+	3.5/5
IGN	8.5/10
PC Gamer (UK)	80%
USgamer	4/5

The game received "generally favourable reviews" according to the review aggregation website Metacritic. Fellow review aggregator OpenCritic assessed that the game received fair approval, being recommended by 63% of critics.

PC Gamer said, "I had high expectations for Afterparty. I was expecting a comedy title, set in a fantasy world that could have been from a Noel Fielding sketch. But the very real relationship between Lola and Milo, the witty humour that had me chuckling every minute and the audacity on show from Night School Studio to go where they did, at the risk of their player's discomfort, made Afterparty even more than I thought it could be." IGN said, "Night School has crafted an original take on the Biblical location, smartly riffed on moral and societal ideas, and told a personal, intriguing story about Milo and Lola's afterlives."

The Verge gave the game a positive review, saying, "Throughout this all, Afterparty weaves together its bigger questions about relationships, growing up, and what it means to be a good person through its sharp-tongued humor. It's a darkly funny game whose laughs benefit from its choice of setting."

=== Accolades ===
The game was nominated for "Game, Original Adventure" and "Writing in a Comedy" at the NAVGTR Awards.
