= Oxenfree =

Graphic adventure video game

- Developer: Night School Studio
- Publisher: Night School Studio (Note: Re-release for Android and iOS by Netflix)
- Directors: Adam Hines; Sean Krankel
- Designers: Adam Hines; Sean Krankel
- Programmer: Bryant Cannon
- Artist: Heather Gross
- Writer: Adam Hines
- Composer: Andrew Rohrmann
- Engine: Unity
- Platforms: OS X; Windows; Xbox One; PlayStation 4; Linux; iOS; Android; Nintendo Switch
- Release: January 15, 2016: OS X, Windows, Xbox One; January 15, 2016; PlayStation 4; May 31, 2016; Linux; June 1, 2016; iOS; March 16, 2017; Android; June 29, 2017; Nintendo Switch; October 6, 2017
- Genre: Graphic adventure
- Mode: Single-player

Oxenfree is a graphic adventure game developed and published by Night School Studio. It was released for OS X, Windows, and Xbox One in January 2016. PlayStation 4 and Linux versions were released later in 2016, followed by iOS, Android, and Nintendo Switch versions in 2017. In Oxenfree, players assume the role of the teenage girl Alex on a weekend trip to a local island. After seemingly supernatural events occur, Alex and her friends must unravel the secrets of the island.

The game is Night School Studio's debut. Influenced by classic teen films and coming-of-age shows, the developers wanted to create a story-driven game without cutscenes, allowing players to roam the environment freely. Oxenfree's visual presentation marries dark, organic, and analog elements with bright, geometric, and digital ones. Musician scntfc composed the game's soundtrack, which features digital music production techniques alongside the use of vintage analog tape recorders and receivers.

Oxenfree's release was accompanied by development documentaries, an alternate reality game, and a collector's edition, and was met with generally positive reviews, with critics praising the presentation and characters, although some of them were left wanting more. The game was nominated for multiple awards including "Best Narrative" at The Game Awards 2016 and "Outstanding Achievement in Story" at the 20th Annual D.I.C.E. Awards. A sequel, Oxenfree II: Lost Signals, was released on July 12, 2023. A television series adaptation is also in development.

== Gameplay ==
Alex (left) and non-player characters Jonas and Ren converse while Alex tunes the radio. The player has three possible dialogue options visible.

Oxenfree is a graphic adventure played from a 2.5D perspective, with three-dimensional characters navigating two-dimensional environments. The player controls Alex, a teenager visiting a local island with a group of friends. After accidentally unleashing a paranormal force on the island, Alex and company must figure out what the force is and how to stop it.

Gameplay is built around the "walk and talk" mechanic: instead of dialogue occurring during cutscenes, speech bubbles appear over Alex's head, giving the player a choice between two or three dialogue options. At the same time, Alex remains free to move around and navigate the game world. Players can select dialogue options at any time during conversations, choosing to wait for other characters to finish, to interrupt, or to remain silent. Certain dialogue options cause a thought bubble with Alex inside it to appear over characters' heads, suggesting that the player's choice had an effect on the characters' relationship.

Objects that can be interacted with in the game world display a small circle next to them. Puzzles in the game are solved by finding the correct frequency on Alex's handheld radio, which can perform actions such as unlocking doors or communicating with ghosts, or by winding up tape recorders at the correct speed. Oxenfree does not have any "game over" loss conditions; the player's choices and relationships with the characters determine which of several possible endings the player receives.

== Plot ==
Alex (Erin Yvette), a teenager, is on the last ferry heading to the fictional Edwards Island for a weekend party. She is accompanied by Ren (Aaron Kuban), her stoner friend, and Jonas (Gavin Hammon), her new stepbrother. On the island, Alex and company meet Clarissa (Avital Ash), the ex-girlfriend of Alex's deceased brother Michael, and Nona (Brittani Johnson), Clarissa's best friend and Ren's love interest. Ren explains the island was once a military base and that the island's only permanent resident, Maggie Adler, has recently died. After camping on the beach, Alex, Ren, and Jonas explore the nearby caves, where it is rumored certain radio frequencies cause supernatural events. In a small cavern, Alex tunes her radio to a floating shape and unexpectedly forms a dimensional rift. A voice answers and the teens experience visions before passing out. Jonas and Alex awake in front of a communications tower elsewhere on the island. Ren calls, having passed out in the woods, while Clarissa calls from the decommissioned military fort on the island.

In the woods, Jonas and Alex encounter supernatural events, including Alex's reflection in the water communicating with her, objects moving on their own, and time looping repeatedly. Time corrects when Alex plays a reel-to-reel tape. They spot Nona, who claims she saw an alternate Jonas and Alex. Alex and Jonas find Ren, but after another time loop, they find him possessed by a "ghost". Using the radio, Alex creates another rift which returns Ren to normal. Ren and Nona return to the tower.

At the military fort, Alex's reflection appears in a mirror, giving Alex advice. A ghost questions them and possesses Jonas, revealing that the ghosts are the crew of the submarine USS Kanaloa, thought lost at sea. Alex creates another rift that revives Jonas. They find Clarissa, but time loops to her jumping to her death before disappearing. Nona, Alex, Jonas, and Ren regroup at Harden Tower. Unable to send a radio transmission off the island, Ren suggests finding the key to Maggie Adler's estate, where she kept a boat. At Adler's estate, a possessed Clarissa talks with Alex; her conversations and scattered letters left behind by Maggie Adler reveal that Adler mistakenly interpreted scrambled messages from Kanaloa as an enemy transmission, and the submarine was sunk by friendly fire. The crew was not killed, but transported to another dimension due to the submarine's experimental nuclear reactor. Adler and her friend Anna had attempted to communicate with the Kanaloa crew via radio, but Anna was absorbed through the rift. The Kanaloa crew intend on using Alex and her friends' bodies to escape the dimension, keeping them on the island long enough for their possession attempts to be successful.

Alex and the group discover Maggie Adler's plan to fix the rifts—crossing to the other side of them and tuning the radio within. Alex repeatedly loops back to the past, mainly to times she talked with Michael. A ghost possesses Jonas and attempts to bargain with Alex, offering to spare her and the rest of her friends if they leave Clarissa behind. Returning to the caves, Alex tunes into a rift that sends her into a void. Encountering the possessed Clarissa, the ghosts warn Alex that she will die if the rift is closed, and Clarissa will be kept by the ghosts if Alex leaves through the rift. Alex can choose to leave, erasing Clarissa from existence; close the rift herself, trapping her with the ghosts; or, if she has found certain letters from Maggie Adler that mention crew members by name, Alex can appeal to them directly, convincing them to let both Clarissa and her go. The reflection of Alex giving her advice is revealed to be Alex from the future. She loops back to a conversation with Michael, who admits that he and Clarissa are planning to move away from town and asks for Alex's advice. Time then corrects.

Alex wakes up with the others on the ferry back home; Jonas informs her that whatever she did fixed the rift and that everything is normal. Everyone reveals that, for a limited period, they revisited memories. They then swear to not tell anyone about their experiences, and Nona takes a final group picture.

=== Endings ===
In an epilogue, Alex reveals the fate of the characters, with Nona's picture of the group shown and the outcomes dependent on actions made during the game:

- Clarissa's friendship with Alex and Michael can be either preserved or destroyed. Clarissa can also be sacrificed to the rift, with no one remembering Clarissa except Alex herself. If she is saved, she will either drop out of school or continue her studies.
- Ren and Nona may or may not be in a long-distance relationship depending on Alex's actions.
- Jonas's relationship with Alex can be either preserved or destroyed.
- Michael can be revived if Alex encourages him not to move away in the time loop. If so, Jonas and Alex will cease to be step-siblings. The player's actions can either destroy or preserve Michael's relationship with Clarissa.

Alex also describes her own plans; she may go to college, either in or out of her hometown, or take time off. Thereafter, the screen flickers and Alex tells the player she is going to Edwards Island and is meeting Jonas for the first time, revealing that time is still looping.

If the player starts another game with the same save file (New Game Plus), Alex has the chance to send herself a message from the island. After the epilogue, a new scene plays of Alex, Jonas, and Ren at a supermarket waiting to buy alcohol before getting on the ferry. Tuning her radio, Alex receives the message her future self sent from the island. Depending on the message sent and how the player responds, Alex, Jonas, and Ren can decide not to go to Edwards Island at all, preventing the loop.

== Development ==
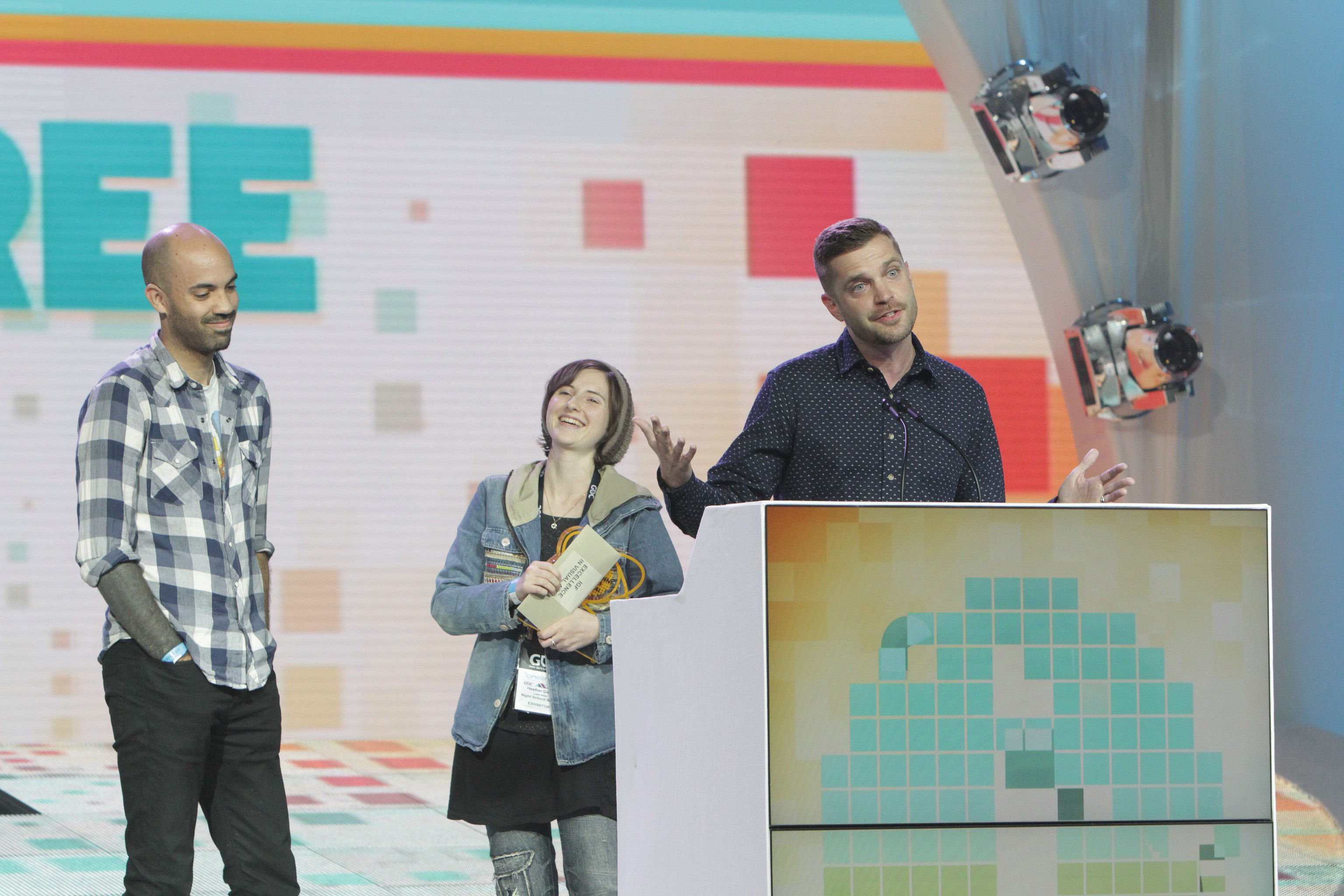
Night School Studio members Adam Hines, Heather Gross, and Sean Krankel at the 2016 Independent Games Festival

Cousins Sean Krankel and Adam Hines founded Night School Studio in 2014, having long wanted to collaborate on a video game together. Hines had worked on Telltale Games's story-focused games like Wolf Among Us, while Krankel had met or worked with many future Night School members at Disney. Hines and Krankel were interested in creating a game that told its story in a unique way.

Krankel and Hines looked at other story-focused games, and felt that they either were linear stories driven by set pieces, or branching, player choice-influenced stories told through cut scenes. "We thought, why not let you move freely while communicating, interacting, and exploring a branching narrative?" Krankel recalled. They wanted to make communication a key mechanic of the game, but allow more freedom than previous story-focused games. "At its core, we wanted to never have a cut scene in the game, where you could walk and move freely and communicate with your friends, and even communicate with other beings and other kind of strange things." Rather than developing the gameplay and attaching a story to it, Night School focused on developing gameplay that would support the story they wanted to tell. Because Night School was a small team, Hines and Krankel had to outline a scope for the game that would be manageable. This meant making sure branching dialogue trees of possible conversation options never became too sprawling.

In developing the story, Krankel and Hines first looked at influences and other media that inspired them. They wanted the story to have scary and supernatural elements, without verging on horror. Krankel said, "We wanted to do something a little bit more ... Spielberg-ian, and sort of give it a sense of wonder and have it, for awhile, just be actually interacting with these supernatural creatures where it's almost a little bit fun, and hopefully, gives you butterflies in your stomach before it gets pretty crazy." The developers were influenced by other coming-of-age stories such as the film Stand by Me when developing the characters and story; Krankel cited the character of Lindsay Weir from the television series Freaks and Geeks as the biggest outside influence on the character of Alex.

Night School set up a casting call for voice actors on the magazine Backstage. The team produced placeholder subtitles in the game prior to casting actors and recording lines. Lead engineer Bryant Cannon recalled that without the voices, he was unsure whether the game would be fun to play; after the voices were added, he could see the characters as believable people having conversations. Hines directed recording sessions, allowing him to change dialogue immediately if he felt material did not work when voiced by the actors. All of the actors voiced their lines separately and out of order, their conversations in-game being stitched together in post-production.

Oxenfree was developed primarily using the Unity game engine, Adobe Photoshop, and Autodesk Maya. The game's artwork was made by Heather Gross, who drew inspiration from her own upbringing—Alex's outfit is made of clothing Gross wore as a child. The team wanted to show multiple characters, dialogue bubbles, and places to explore in the environment on the screen simultaneously. This directly influenced the game's two-dimensional look and distance from the player characters on screen. Working with these requirements, Gross created parallaxing, painterly backgrounds. The dark, organic elements of the setting were designed in contrast to the supernatural elements, which are bright and geometric. The animation, art, and effects required for the game's major plot developments ended up taking more time than Hines and Krankel expected, but they found that it helped organize their story in the process.

=== Audio ===
American music composer and sound designer Andrew Rohrmann, known under his alias scntfc, created Oxenfree's audio. Krankel knew Rohrmann through a friend of a friend and had not known of his game music pedigree. Initially, Night School Studio was unsure about what they wanted the game's music to sound like. Hines mentioned that they gave Rohrmann "random" suggestions for the sound, including "John Carpenter meets Boards of Canada", but were impressed with the music they got in response.

Krankel said the goal was for the music to feel simultaneously analog and digital, "so that it's nostalgic without being set in a specific time in the past". Rohrmann combined digital recording techniques and plugins with analog ones, running some sounds through old cassette decks and reel-to-reel tape. The shortwave radio Alex uses in the game was created by recording sounds through a World War II-era radio set. Much of the music was not scored to specific scenes, but for certain moods; Rohrmann estimated 90% of the songs in the completed game were identical to his original demo recordings. The soundtrack was released on January 15, 2016, to accompany the game, with a limited edition vinyl shipping later.

== Promotion and release ==
Night School posted a teaser for the game on March 1, 2015, followed by a full announcement four days later at the Game Developers Conference. In October 2015, it was announced that the game would be released in January 2016; this announcement coincided with a second teaser from the game. After release, Skybound Entertainment approached Night School to help develop additional media for the game. In January 2016, Skybound released multiple episodes as part of their Creator Series about the creation of Oxenfree, detailing the story, art, mechanics, and voice acting. Night School partnered with iam8bit to create a collector's edition of the game, which featured items such as a cassette tape demo of Ren's band in the game, a map of the island, poster, and code for the game.

The PlayStation 4 (PS4) version of the game was announced on April 27 and released May 31. The PS4 version of the game added the New Game+ mode as well as platform-specific tweaks, like using the DualShock 4 controller to adjust the game's radio. An iOS version of the game was released on the Apple App Store on March 16, 2017. The game was added to Netflix's mobile gaming app in September 2022.

The game also has an alternate reality game (ARG) counterpart. Within the game are radio frequencies that provide hints to a real phone number. This phone number led players to the Twitter account @xray9169363733. The account posted various cryptic, coded messages, all of which seemed to point to a real world location. On May 7, 2016, YouTuber Jesse Cox posted a video similar to the PS4 Oxenfree trailer, but with several letters highlighted in red. This led players to edwardsisland.com. Several messages were found, but most important was "MILNER IS WARD", confirming that a special object would be hidden at Fort Ward, Washington. On June 11, 2016, fans playing the ARG discovered the object was a box with letters by Alex from all the possible timelines from the game, and a manually operated tape player with two paper music tapes of songs from the game soundtrack.

== Reception ==
Reception

Aggregate score
Aggregator	Score
Metacritic	PC: 80/100; XONE: 78/100; PS4: 79/100 iOS: 87/100; NS: 81/100

Review scores
Publication	Score
Destructoid	9/10
Electronic Gaming Monthly	7.5/10
Game Informer	7.75/10
GameRevolution	4/5
GameSpot	8/10
IGN	8.2/10
Official Xbox Magazine (UK)	3.5/5
PC Gamer (US)	83/100
Polygon	7/10
VideoGamer.com	8/10

Oxenfree was positively reviewed by critics, each version of the game receiving "generally favorable" reviews according to Metacritic. Wired wrote that "Oxenfree shows some smart thinking about the relationship between games and players", and that as Night School's first game, it was an "auspicious debut". Destructoid praised the game for taking inspiration from old movies but still being "anything but generic", writing: "It dials into its own style and mood, tapping into something very heartfelt and special. It might just be the best 'horror' game I've played in years." Polygon's reviewer offered a less enthusiastic take, writing that despite offering many promising attributes, "I finished Oxenfree with my mouth agape, feeling wholly unsatisfied."

The game's audiovisual presentation was commonly considered a strength of the game. Destructoid called the game's watercolor art style "gorgeous". Electronic Gaming Monthly favorably contrasted Oxenfree's traditional media style with the much more common retro pixel styling of indie games. The magazine and others also favorably highlighted the contrast between the watercolor look of the environment and the sharp, digital effects of the paranormal; Electronic Gaming Monthly called it a "massive success" while Destructoid noted the usual softness of the visuals made the intrusion of digital elements feel more unnerving.

Reviewers felt that the naturalistic dialogue of Oxenfree was a strength. Polygon credited Oxenfree for not relying on lazy or clichéd speech, and GameSpot highlighted the interplay between characters that deepened as the game progressed. IGN in contrast felt that characters such as Ren had grating or stilted dialogue. GamesTM and The A.V. Club credited the game with delivering organic dialogue options that lacked any clear good or bad associations. Reviewers such as VideoGamer.com's Tom Orry felt the script sometimes failed to convey realistic panic or distress of the characters in their exceptional circumstances. IGN's reviewer noted that despite her efforts, some dialogue choices unavoidably hurt relationships in the game. "It's an important reminder that you can't "win" social situations, and that kept Oxenfree's supernatural plot points grounded in reality", she wrote. Game Informer considered the opaque results of choices an occasional hindrance, with the opposite reactions of expected actions feeling "wrong". In contrast, GameSpot appreciated that some consequences of dialogue choices did not become clear until much later in the game, encouraging repeat playthroughs to try different approaches.

Polygon named the game among the decade's best.

=== Accolades ===
Accolades by year
Year	Award	Category	Result	Ref.
2016	Independent Games Festival Awards 2016	Excellence in Visual Art	Won	
2016	Unity Awards 2016	Best 2D Visual Experience	Nominated	
2016	Golden Joystick Awards 2016	Best Storytelling	Nominated	
2016	Golden Joystick Awards 2016	Best Indie Game	Nominated	
2016	The Game Awards 2016	Best Narrative	Nominated	
2017	20th Annual D.I.C.E. Awards	Outstanding Achievement in Story	Nominated	
2017	17th Game Developers Choice Awards	Best Debut (Night School Studio)	Nominated	
2017	17th Game Developers Choice Awards	Best Narrative	Nominated	
2017	SXSW Gaming Awards	Excellence in Narrative	Nominated	
2017	13th British Academy Games Awards	Debut Game	Nominated	
2017	13th British Academy Games Awards	Narrative	Nominated	
2018	National Academy of Video Game Trade Reviewers Awards	Writing in a Comedy (iOS/Android/Switch)	Nominated	

== Sequel ==
In 2021, Night School announced that a sequel, Oxenfree II: Lost Signals, would be released on PC, Nintendo Switch, PlayStation 4 and PlayStation 5, as well on Android and iOS as Netflix Games exclusive. The sequel takes place five years after Oxenfree, with a new character, an environmental researcher named Riley, who is returning to her hometown of Camena to investigate strange radio transmissions. Night School Studio updated Oxenfree's radio transmissions to tie into the sequel's release. Originally slated for a 2021 release, the game released July 12, 2023.

== Television series adaptation ==
In 2016, writer Robert Kirkman was reported to be planning to help adapt Oxenfree into a film via Skybound. Krankel said the film fell through because of the complicated Hollywood studio system, and in 2021 reported that the project was moving forward as a television series.
