= Laya's Horizon =

2023 video game

- Developer: Snowman
- Publisher: Netflix
- Director: Jason Medeiros
- Producers: Michael Fallik; Owais Akhtar
- Designer: Jesse Baker
- Artists: Mathijs Demaeght; Pallavi Maruvada
- Writer: Colin McCall
- Composer: Wobblersound
- Platforms: Android; iOS
- Release: May 2, 2023
- Genre: Action
- Mode: Single-player

Laya's Horizon is a 2023 action game developed by Snowman and published by Netflix through its subscription service. The game features the player character, Laya, exploring a small, mountainous island via repeatedly gliding with a wingsuit down from peaks to the coast. The player controls the wingsuit to steer Laya throughout the open world area, exploring the island and completing challenges from other non-playable gliders.

The game began development in 2018 as the studio's largest title to date and first open world 3D game, a departure from their previous linear titles such as Alto's Adventure and Skate City. It was developed based on the central concept of using touchscreen controls to create the feeling of wingsuit flight, set inside an explorable, peaceful world. Snowman chose Netflix as the publisher so that the game design would not be impacted by a need to monetize the game with advertisements or in-app purchases. Laya's Horizon was released for Netflix subscribers on iOS and Android in May 2023. The game was positively received by critics, who acclaimed its open, relaxing gameplay and sense of flight, along with the quality of the island's environmental design.

== Gameplay ==
Laya gliding near the coast. Several sparks trail behind her, and an updraft can be seen in the clouds.

Laya's Horizon is an action game set on a small mountainous island open world in which the player character, a girl named Laya, uses a cape as a wingsuit to repeatedly glide down from peaks to the coast. The game does not have a plot, instead revealing elements of the history of the characters and island as the game is played, such as that their ancestors had shipwrecked on the island. The player uses two fingers as touchscreen gesture controls for the sides of the wingsuit to make Laya steer, dive, pull up, or parachute to the ground. A single run takes a few minutes, after which Laya is returned to the last peak she was on. The island is composed of multiple biomes which the player may freely glide through, constrained only by gravity, and features numerous structures, trees, hot air balloons, and other gliders.

Flying near the ground or objects or performing tricks such as diving give the player "sparks", or energy in the form of yellow triangles following Laya, which can be used to accelerate her flight. Sparks can also be found as floating yellow triangles near obstacles such as narrow passages. Small atmospheric elements, such as updrafts or wind tunnels, can accelerate Laya upwards or forwards. The game provides flight goals to complete in sets of three, such as flying near 30 trees, and new wingsuit capes with differing abilities are given periodically as sets are accomplished. There are several non-playable characters, "Windfolk", throughout the island that give challenges such as winning races or following challenging flight paths. Completing these challenges grants the player "trinkets" that also give differing flight abilities.

== Development and release ==
The game was developed by Toronto studio Snowman, which had previously made the snowboarding-based Alto's Adventure (2015), among others. Producer Owais Akhtar describes the company's design aesthetic as creating games that center on "the rhythm of movement" with a "meditative experience". Development on Laya's Horizon started in 2018 with just a few people, reaching 30 developers at its peak. Snowman had included a wingsuit element in Alto's Adventure, partially due to studio cofounder Ryan Cash's interest in flight, and wanted to explore that concept deeper. After researching wingsuit flight, they decided to make the central concept of the game be using touchscreen controls to create the "kinesthetic", or feeling, of controlling a wingsuit. Using that, they tried to create a "childhood dream" of flying, set inside of a peaceful world without conflict that would feel like an escape to players. Cash likened the intended feeling to that of players "riding their bikes with their friends around their neighborhood", exploring and finding secrets in a "friendly world".

Early in development, Snowman had to decide how to balance "the rules and physics of real-life wingsuiting" with making a fun and relaxing experience. Once the basics of the game were created, part of the development process became "chipping away" elements that could frustrate or impede players. Some of the frustrations caused by the nature of always being in the process of falling down the mountain were alleviated by placing landing spots partway down, letting the player parachute to a landing whenever they wanted to end a run, and adding updraft spots to give Laya back some elevation, but it was still easy for less experienced players to crash. This was alleviated by adding an "air cushion" to push Laya up when she is near the ground, and a time rewind mechanic when the player does crash, to make accidents less likely to end a run.

The visual design of the game was inspired by several sources, including the 1984 film Nausicaä of the Valley of the Wind, which inspired the wood and stone design of the villages on the island as well as the "magical lore" of the game, with windmills and wind catchers throughout the island to correspond with the inhabitants' relationship with magic through wind. Laya's Horizon was Snowman's first game with significant interactions with non-playable characters, and so the game became an experiment in creating a sense of place and character through both brief dialogues with characters and the art design of the different biomes of the island.

The game's music and sound design were composed by the Austrian studio Wobblersound, made up of David and Markus Zahradnicek. To fit with the game's aesthetics, they based the soundtrack on folk and world music, with an emphasis on woodwind instruments and a "light and airy" tonal quality. The wide variety of woodwind instruments, including a quena, ocarina, bansuri, and transverse flute, were played by Austrian flutist Veronika Vitazkova. The music itself was designed to adapt to what the player was doing, and changes tempo and volume and adds or removes instruments based on how fast Laya is flying or how close she is to the ground. It also uses different instruments in each of the game's four main biomes, and has twelve different introduction sections in each biome, in order to keep the music from feeling repetitive in successive runs.

Laya's Horizon has been described by the studio as their largest game to date; previous games were linear and procedurally generated, but Laya is a manually-created open world design. It was also developed by the company's largest internal team to date. Akhtar claims that, while individual game loops were designed for mobile players and take only a few minutes, exploring the entire game would take new players 20 to 40 hours, and even the game's developers over a dozen hours.

The game was Snowman's second to be published by Netflix, after Lucky Luna (2022). The developers wanted to not have the game be interrupted by advertisements or in-app purchases, and so felt that connecting it to a subscription service like Netflix Games or Apple Arcade would be best. They also felt that having the game therefore be free to subscribers allowed them to focus on the design of the game without having to change it to assist with sales or monetization. As of the game's release, Snowman intended to continue to use Netflix as a publisher in the future. It announced the game with a teaser trailer on March 9, 2023. It was then released on May 2 for iOS and Android. A digital soundtrack album for the game was released by Wobblersound on November 7.

== Reception ==
Reception

Review scores
Publication	Score
Pocket Gamer	4.5/5
TouchArcade	5/5
IGN India	9.5/10
Mac Format	5/5

Laya's Horizon was well received by critics upon release. It was nominated for Best Netflix Game and Best Platforming Game of the year by Pocket Gamer, was runner-up for Mobile Game of the Year by Edge, and nominated for Best Mobile Game at the New York Game Awards 2024. Reviewers praised the flight experience and controls, with Shaun Musgrave of TouchArcade saying that the "joy of mastering your gliding skills" was the best part of the game, while Jared Nelson of TouchArcade, in naming it their game of the week, said the flying "feels like a natural extension of yourself". Will Quick of Pocket Gamer praised the exhilarating feeling of flight in the game, and Rupesh Nair of IGN India said that the controls were the most fun part. Andrew Webster of The Verge said how good it felt to fly around was the most important thing about the game.

The IGN India review also praised the quality of the island's details, which was echoed by TouchArcade in praising the beauty and charm of the environment and characters. Both reviews also praised the fitting and "serene" music and sound effects. Alex Blake of MacFormat praised the "gorgeous" and "soothing" visual design. The Verge review, Michael Potuck of 9to5Mac, and Chris Plante of Polygon all focused on enjoying gliding down the mountain without focusing on missions or goals, and instead exploring the design and hidden areas of the islands. Plante summarized that "Laya's Horizon is a chill-out game, above all else."
