= Blek (disambiguation) =

Blek is a 2013 puzzle video game.

Blek may also refer to:

- Blek le Rat, a French graffiti artist
- Mary Leigh Blek, an American gun control advocate
