= Lucky Luna =

2022 video game

- Developers: Nacho Barbas; Snowman
- Publisher: Netflix
- Producer: Andrew Schimmel
- Artist: Anaïs Maamar
- Composer: Oda Tilset
- Platforms: Android; iOS
- Release: September 8, 2022
- Genre: Platform
- Mode: Single-player

Lucky Luna is a 2022 platform game developed by Snowman and published by Netflix through its Netflix Games subscription service. The game features the player character, a girl in a fox mask named Luna, traversing a series of underground levels connected by portals to an abandoned temple. The player moves the world left and right around Luna using the touchscreen while avoiding obstacles and hazards. Unlike in most platformers, Luna cannot jump, and the levels are primarily oriented vertically with Luna falling from the top. The game has six handmade levels with different themes in the story mode, and infinite procedurally generated versions of those levels in the endless mode.

The game began development in 2014 as Cerulean Moon, a project by Spanish programmer Nacho "Nachobeard" Barbas. It was originally planned for release in 2016, but was still in development in 2020 when Barbas joined Snowman. Barbas and the studio worked on the title for another two years, adding the endless mode and finishing the game. Snowman chose Netflix as the publisher so that the design would not be impacted by a need to monetize the game with advertisements or in-app purchases. Lucky Luna was released for Netflix subscribers on iOS and Android in September 2022. The game was positively received by critics, who praised its design, aesthetics, and innovation, but gave some criticism to the difficulty.

== Gameplay and plot ==
Luna in a lava-themed level, with several pearls near her

Lucky Luna is a platform game in which the player character, a young girl named Luna wearing a fox mask, traverses a series of underground levels. The game begins with Luna waking up on a beach and following a fox into a temple, which contains portals to each of the six levels. The player controls Luna by using the touchscreen controls to move left and right; unlike most platformers, there is no jump mechanic. The levels are primarily vertical, with Luna falling through gaps in the platforms or being lifted by elements such as fountains of water or dragonflies. Luna is always in the center of the screen, with the world moving around her. The levels each have a theme, such as water, lava, or jungles, and contain obstacles that will kill Luna if touched such as boiling water, spikes, or lava. Upon death, Luna returns to the last checkpoint reached. Each level ends with Luna following the fox into a portal back to the temple; the first time the player completes a level causes the portal to the next to activate.

The levels contain treasures scattered throughout, referred to as pearls. At the completion of a stage, the player is graded on their pearl count, speed, and number of deaths, and given a score. The levels also each contain one to four shrine slates, located in hidden areas. If the player collects all shrine slates in the six stages, a seventh portal is opened, which when entered shows a cutscene of Luna on the Moon, being greeted and placed on a throne.

The game includes an endless mode, in which the player traverses procedurally generated versions of the six levels. This mode features no checkpoints, with death ending the run and returning the player to the temple. The levels are divided into numbered segments, with a challenge given every few segments that can award up to four shrine slates per level. Collecting all of these shrine slates, in addition to the ones in the story mode of the game, gives an alternate ending cutscene. In this ending, Luna places her fox mask into an altar, and the temple collapses. Luna wakes up on a different shore with houses in the background, and is shown traversing the island with the fox.

== Development ==
The game began development as Cerulean Moon in late 2014 as a project by Spanish programmer Nacho "Nachobeard" Barbas. The game's setting was inspired by The Tale of the Bamboo Cutter, a tale from Japanese folklore about a princess from the Moon who grows up on Earth, who sets her six suitors impossible tasks before ascending to her throne on the Moon. Barbas created the jumpless, swiping control scheme in order to have the game be immediately understandable by players without any explicit instruction. Pixel art for the game was provided by several artists, primarily Anaïs Maamar.

The first public notice of the project was in December 2014, with further details given in early 2015. Barbas was selected as one of the invitees at the Stugan game incubator program in Sweden in mid-2015. Cerulean Moon was shown at Gamescom in August. Barbas described the game's levels there as "descending dungeons". He also there announced a planned 2016 release date for the game, for mobile devices and computers, with the possibility of consoles with touchscreen capabilities afterwards.

Cerulean Moon was nominated for Best Upcoming Game at the 12th Internet Mobile Game Awards in early 2016, but afterwards the project had no further public announcements. In 2020, Barbas joined Toronto studio Snowman, which had previously made the snowboarding-based Alto's Adventure (2015), among other games. There, the game was renamed to Lucky Luna, and remained under development through mid-2022. During that time, the game was refined and the endless mode was added. The producer, Andrew Schimmel, described finishing the story mode and creating the endless mode as like building two complementary games at the same time.

Snowman announced Lucky Luna in June 2022, to be published for iOS and Android by Netflix as part of their Netflix Games subscription service. Snowman chose Netflix Games in order to pursue development of the game as a "premium" title without having a high price or changing the design to accommodate monetization schemes like advertisements or in-app purchases. Although multiple people from Snowman worked on the final product with feedback from Netflix, Barbas is listed in the credits as the lead developer, game designer, and creator of the concept, and Maamar is credited as the art director. Lucky Luna was released on September 8 of the same year for iOS and Android.

== Reception ==
Lucky Luna did not receive widespread attention from reviewers, but was well-received by critics upon release. It was nominated for mobile Game of the Year by Pocket Gamer. Reviewers praised the platforming gameplay, with Will Quick of Pocket Gamer saying that it struck a "balance [...] between casual and engaging". Jared Nelson of TouchArcade, in a review naming it the site's game of the week, said that Lucky Luna was one of the best examples of taking a genre and removing an element—jumping—to create something new. He also said that the exploration in the story mode was interesting and fun, and praised the replayability. DeAngelo Epps of Digital Trends also praised the replayability and called it an innovative experiment. Andrew Webster of The Verge praised the "clever design" of the levels with the lack of jumping, but noted that the game was difficult. Rachel Morgen of Android Central similarly liked the game, but found it harder than they expected and said that some parts of it were "incredibly frustrating".

The aesthetics were praised, with Nelson of TouchArcade calling it "absolutely gorgeous with stunning animations" and Webster of The Verge calling it beautiful. Quick of Pocket Gamer praised the variety and scale of the game. Edge claimed that the style of the game was reminiscent of Fez (2012), while Brett Venter of Stuff South Africa instead drew a connection to Child of Light (2014). Epps of Digital Trends praised the artwork and "excellent" atmosphere, sentiments echoed by Morgen of Android Central, who also praised the "atmospheric" soundtrack.
