= Alto's Odyssey =

2018 video game

- Developer: Team Alto
- Publishers: Noodlecake Studios (Android), Snowman (iOS)
- Director: Ryan Cash
- Producer: Eli Cymet
- Designers: Harry Nesbitt; Joe Grainger
- Programmers: Harry Nesbitt; Joe Grainger
- Artist: Harry Nesbitt
- Composers: Todd Baker; Torin Borrowdale
- Engine: Unity
- Platforms: iOS; tvOS; Android; Microsoft Windows; PlayStation 4; Xbox One; Nintendo Switch; macOS
- Release: February 21, 2018: iOS, tvOS; February 21, 2018; Android; July 25, 2018; macOS; February 19, 2020; Windows, PS4, Xbox One; August 13, 2020; Nintendo Switch; November 26, 2020
- Genres: Endless runner, snowboarding
- Mode: Single Player

Alto's Odyssey is an endless runner and sandboarding video game developed by Team Alto, and published by Snowman for iOS, and Noodlecake Studios for Android. The player controls Alto as he explores the endless desert across different biomes, each with unique traversal mechanics and challenges. Developed over a year and a half, it was released in 2018. It is the sequel to Alto's Adventure (2015).

== Gameplay ==
Alto's Odyssey keeps the same basic gameplay of its predecessor, Alto's Adventure. The player chooses between a cast of characters, each with different characteristics ranging from a higher jump to the ability to speed through rocks. At its core the game remains a side-scrolling endless runner, in which the player character now sandboards through a desert setting, instead of snowboarding as in the original game. The player can jump by tapping the screen and do tricks by holding down on it. By doing tricks the player can increase their score which is uploaded to an online leaderboard at the end of their run. The desert features three biomes that the player can unlock, each focusing on different mechanics.

A sandstorm, one of the new dynamic weather events in Alto's Odyssey

At the beginning of the game, the player starts in the dunes, which features rolling hills and rocks for the player to avoid. Another biome is the canyons, requiring the new wall-riding mechanic, which allows the player to climb up canyon walls by holding down on the screen. The final biome is the temples, featuring vines that the player can ride on and waterfalls that can speed the player up. Later in the game, it is possible to unlock a compass which allows the player to travel between biomes for a fixed cost in coins.

In addition to wall-riding, the game adds new features, such as water physics, tornadoes, falling platforms, an invulnerability power-up, balloon bouncing; alongside mechanics returning from the first installment such as a day-night cycle, weather, and the wingsuit. Like its predecessor, in addition to its original game mode, it also has a Zen mode, in which the player is invulnerable and can get up after hitting obstacles.

The game also retains the challenge system of the first game, where completing challenges allows the player to level up and unlock new characters. In Odyssey's "Workshop", the player can spend coins they collected in order to upgrade power-ups or unlock new abilities and features.

== Development ==
Snowman and Nesbitt (dubbed "Team Alto") announced the sequel in December 2016. It was originally supposed to launch in the summer of 2017, but was delayed until early 2018, "to make it perfect", according to the studio. On February 12, 2018, Team Alto announced the official release date with a trailer on their YouTube channel. Ten days before, the game was given a release date of February 22, 2018 for iOS.

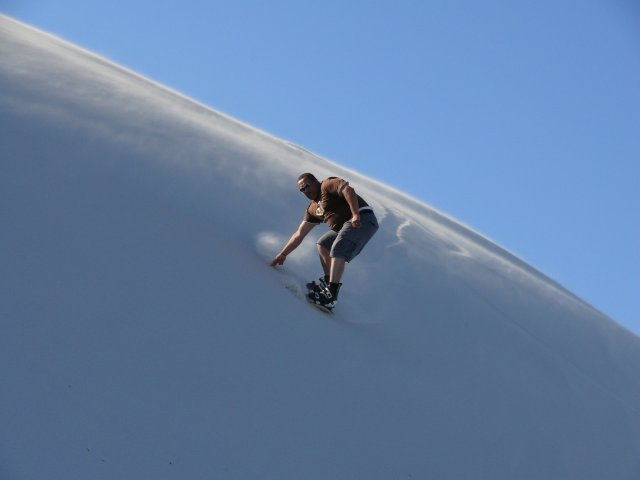
Sandboarding, one of the new mechanics in the game

The game was intended to be a successor to Alto's Adventure, rather than a game that rethought the mechanics of the series. Other mechanics such as a grappling hook were considered, but were axed because they complicated the one-touch gameplay. Wall-riding and balloon bouncing were added in order to build more verticality into environments as Team Alto felt the game world was too static in Adventure. The new biomes expanded the scope of the game a great deal, with one developer commenting "That approach required us to virtually triple the amount of assets we were producing, and item zones we were creating to place content in the environment". Each area was designed to feel distinct to play, instead of being a purely visual change. The ruins in particular were inspired by the worlds of games like Journey and Ico.

Code from the original game was used in Odyssey, but was significantly modified. Odyssey uses the Metal API on iOS, which the developers switched to for better performance and stability over OpenGL. The game aims for a 60 frames per second target, and uses lower quality shaders for weaker hardware in order to maintain performance. Odyssey takes advantage of Apple's Haptic engine in order to give feedback for landing a trick or when the player interacts with the game world.

Alto's Odyssey was initially launched only on iOS, with an Android release slated for a later date. On February 21, 2018, the game was released on the App Store at a price of US$4.99. On June 4 of that year, the game was awarded an Apple Design Award. Later in July it was released on the Android platform as a free-to-play game. In an interview with Team Alto, they cited disappointing revenue for premium games on Android as the reason for turning to a free-to-play model.

On August 4, 2019, Team Alto announced that Alto's Odyssey, alongside Alto's Adventure, would be released for Microsoft Windows, PlayStation 4, and Xbox One on August 13, 2020, as part of The Alto Collection. A macOS port came out on February 19, 2020, and a Nintendo Switch version was released on November 26, 2020. A version for Apple Arcade with an additional city area was set for release on July 16, 2021, under the title Alto's Odyssey: The Lost City.

== Reception ==
Reception

Aggregate score
Aggregator	Score
Metacritic	88/100

Review scores
Publication	Score
Pocket Gamer	4.5/5
TouchArcade	4.5/5
CGMagazine	9.5/10

Alto's Odyssey received "generally favorable reviews" according to review aggregator, Metacritic.

CGMagazine's Alex Handziuk praised the sound design of the game, writing that the game was "immensely calming" and "full of lush piano motifs and swelling crescendos that do a superb job of invoking emotion in the player". He also enjoyed the game's Zen mode, saying that " I genuinely felt a feeling of relaxation while playing the mode and it works surprisingly well as a form of meditation".

Pocket Gamer thought that Alto's Odyssey's visuals improved over its predecessor, remarking "Alto's Odyssey manages to one-up Adventure in terms of creating a gorgeous atmosphere". However, the outlet criticized the game for sticking too close to the first game, making the game feel familiar.

Carter Dotson of TouchArcade liked the new biomes as he thought they gave more variety to each run. Dotson criticized the amount of coins required to unlock new items, saying that the game "becomes about the grind to get more coins".

The game was nominated for the A-Train Award for Best Mobile Game at the New York Game Awards; "Mobile Game of the Year" at the SXSW Gaming Awards; "Excellence in Visual Art" and "Excellence in Audio" at the Independent Games Festival Awards; "Best Mobile Game" at the Game Developers Choice Awards; "Mobile Game" at the 15th British Academy Games Awards, and "Best Mobile Game" at the Italian Video Game Awards.
