= TAK ensemble =

American contemporary chamber ensemble

TAK ensemble is a contemporary chamber ensemble based in New York City consisting of flute, clarinet, violin, percussion, and soprano voice.

== History ==
TAK ensemble was founded in 2013 and performed their first concert in Greenpoint, Brooklyn on May 4, 2013.

TAK's debut album, Ecstatic Music: TAK plays Taylor Brook, was released on New Focus Recordings in 2016 and was featured as Q2 Music's Album of the Week by WQXR and listed in the Top 10 Classical Albums of 2016 by the Boston Globe. Their second album, Sanctuary, with Mario Diaz de Leon, was released on Denovali Records. Their third album, Oor—with works by Natacha Diels, Tyshawn Sorey, Ann Cleare, Ashkan Behzadi, David Bird, and Erin Gee—was the inaugural release on their in-house media label, TAK editions. The TAK editions Podcast was launched in fall 2019 and features interviews with guests with whom the ensemble collaborates. Ensemble Pamplemousse's four-volume Lost at Sea is the label's second release and came out in September 2019.

TAK ensemble has premiered over 150 works since their founding, collaborating with composers such as David Bird, Taylor Brook, Erin Gee, Ashkan Behzadi, Tyshawn Sorey, Natacha Diels, Jessie Marino, Brandon Lopez, Bethany Younge, Diana Marcela Rodriguez, Seth Cluett, Julien Malaussena, Michelle Lou, Eric Wubbels, and many others. The ensemble has recently performed at the Library of Congress, Harpa, Miller Theater, Look and Listen Festival, Cluster Festival, Grypario Cultural Center, Roulette Intermedium, Scandinavia House, La Sala Rossa, The Music Gallery, Abrons Art Center, Mount Tremper Arts, The Invisible Dog, La Mama Experimental Theater Club, Issue Project Room, and others.

TAK often collaborates with composers and artists to produce large-scale events or concerts, including a recent collaboration with Qubit New Music entitled "21st Century Sound Stories" with theatrical works by Qubit composers, David Bird, Alec Hall, and Aaron Einbond. From 2014 to 2016 TAK ensemble worked with TELE-violet, director Katherine Brook, writer Shonni Enelow, and composer Taylor Brook to produce "The Power of Emotion," an evening-length work of experimental music theater.

TAK ensemble has collaborated with departments at Columbia University, Stanford University, University of Pennsylvania, Cornell University, New York University, Williams College, Saint Cloud State University, McGill University, Oberlin College and Conservatory, the Delian Academy of New Music, Boston University, University of New Orleans, Tulane University, the New York Philharmonic Very Young Composers, and the Juilliard School's Music Advancement Program.

== Members ==
TAK is composed of five performers and two technical directors. All members of TAK are co-artistic directors.

- Laura Cocks (flutes, executive director)
- Madison Greenstone (clarinets)
- Marina Kifferstein (violin)
- Ellery Trafford (percussion)
- Charlotte Mundy (voice)
- David Bird (technical director)
- Taylor Brook (technical director)

=== Past members ===
- Liam Kinson (clarinet): 2013–2015
- Carlos Cordeiro (clarinet) 2016–2019

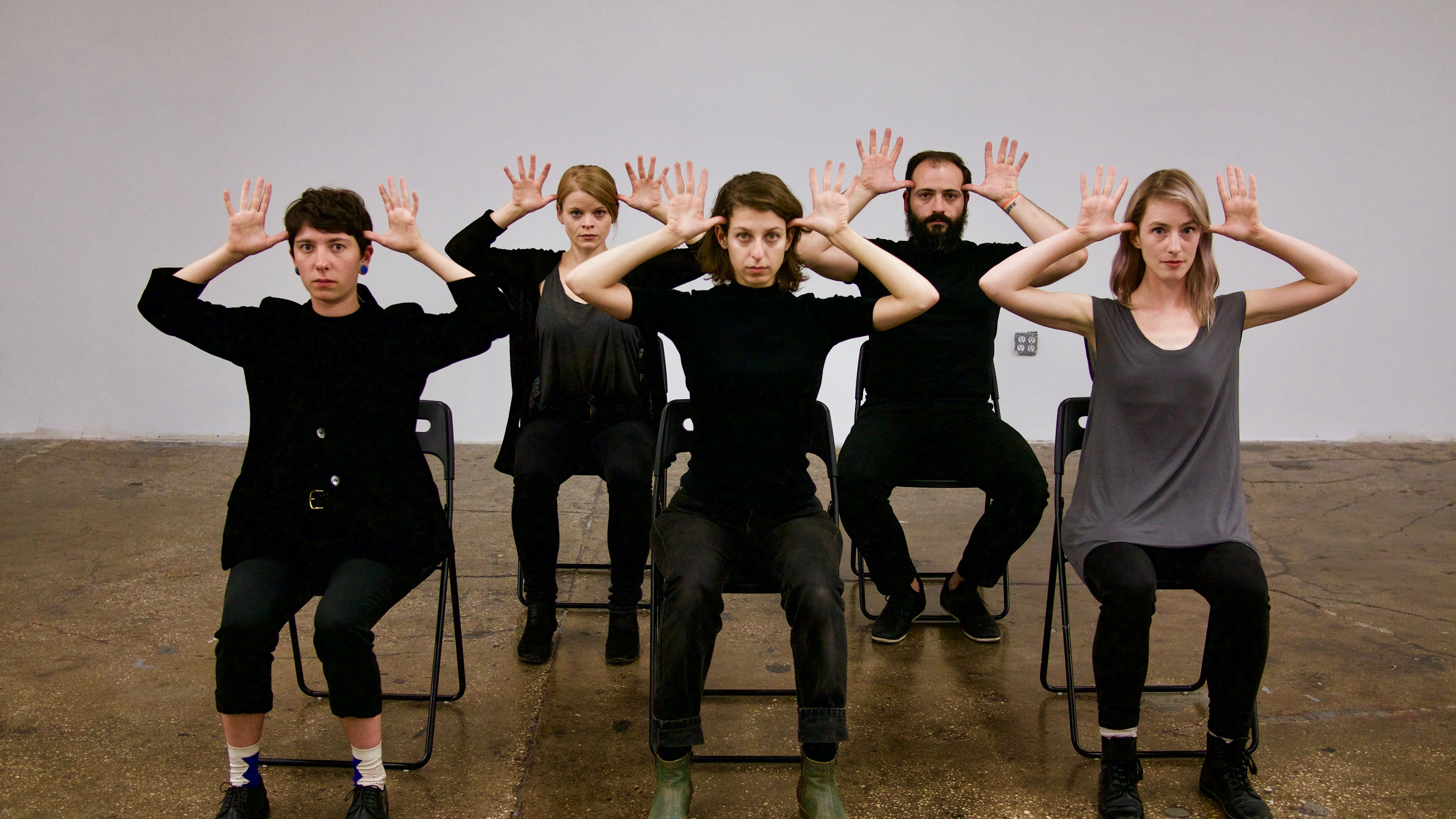
TAK ensemble performing Jessie Marino's Portrait of a Squirrel and a Starling. Photographed by David Bird at Chashama Studios in Long Island City. ©TAK ensemble 2019

== Discography ==
- Ecstatic Music: TAK plays Brook (New Focus, 2016); Works by Taylor Brook
- Sanctuary with Mario Diaz de Leon (Denovali, 2018)
- Oor (TAK editions, 2019); Works by Ashkan Behzadi, Erin Gee, Tyshawn Sorey, David Bird, Natacha Diels, and Ann Cleare
- Ghost Layers (New Focus, 2020); Works by Scott L. Miller
- Star Maker Fragments (TAK editions, 2021); Works by Taylor Brook

== Videography ==
- Mouthpiece 28 (TAK editions, 2019); Composed by Erin Gee, directed by TAK, filmed by Cutting Bird Media, edited and produced by Laura Cocks
- The Colors Don't Match (TAK editions, 2019); Composed by Natacha Diels, filmed and produced by Natacha Diels and Annie Hornier
- Amalgam (New Focus, 2016); Composed by Taylor Brook, filmed and produced by David Bird
- Idolum (Live); Composed by Taylor Brook, filmed and recorded by Michael Kohlbrenner and Bart Courtright for Hooke Audio, Hooke Live Sessions
- Series Imposture (Live); Composed by David Bird, filmed and recorded by David Bird and Taylor Brook
