= Snowman (company) =

Canadian video game company

Built by Snowman, Inc.
- Type: Private
- Industry: Video games
- Founded: 2012; 14 years ago
- Headquarters: Toronto, Canada
- Key people: Ryan Cash (CEO)
- Website: builtbysnowman.com

Built By Snowman, Inc., doing business Snowman, is a mobile app and video game developer as well as publisher based in Toronto. It developed Alto's Adventure (2015) and sequel Alto's Odyssey (2018), both endless runner game with procedurally generated landscapes. Ryan Cash and Jordan Rosenberg previously worked on productivity mobile apps before starting work on games in 2012.

== History ==
Snowman developed the iOS app Checkmark in 2012. Its first game was Circles, based on Simon. The team released Alto's Adventure in 2015 under the name Team Alto.

In March 2016, Snowman announced Where Cards Fall, a collaboration designer Sam Rosenthal and his game studio The Game Band. Snowman also announced DISTANT, a game created by the two-person team at Slingshot & Satchel in November. It released Alto's Odyssey, the sequel to Alto's Adventure, again under the name Team Alto in 2018.

Snowman spun out Montessori education-inspired learning app Pok Pok, conceived by a Belgian couple, in 2022. The split was due to the app's younger target audience compared to Snowman's products. Cash's sister Melissa joined Snowman in 2017 to help with the launch of Pok Pok.

== Games ==
Year	Title	Developer	Publisher	Platform(s)
2015	Alto's Adventure	Team Alto	Snowman, Noodlecake Studios (Android)	Android, iOS, macOS, Windows
2018	Alto's Odyssey	Team Alto	Snowman, Noodlecake Studios (Android)	Android, iOS, macOS
2019	Skate City	Agens Games	Snowman	iOS, macOS, Windows, Nintendo Switch, PlayStation 4, Xbox One
2019	Where Cards Fall	The Game Band	Snowman	iOS, macOS, Windows, Nintendo Switch
2022	Lucky Luna	Snowman	Netflix	Android, iOS
2023	Laya's Horizon	Snowman	Netflix	Android, iOS
2025	Skate City: New York	Agens	Snowman	iOS, macOS, tvOS
TBA	DISTANT	Slingshot & Satchel	Snowman	Windows, macOS, tvOS
