= Erin Gee (composer) =

American composer

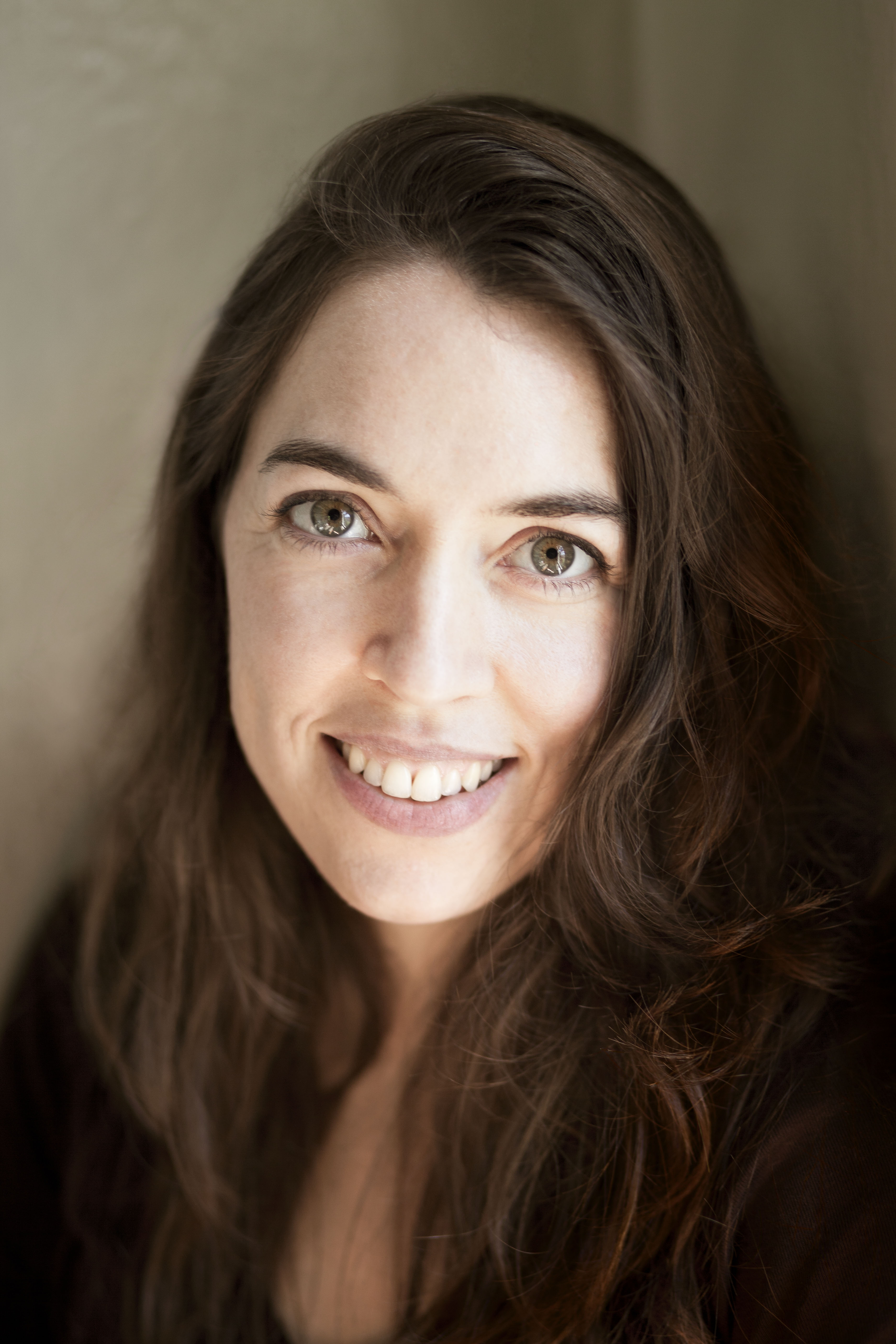
Gee in 2010

Erin Elizabeth Gee (born 1974) (born San Luis Obispo, California) is an American composer and vocalist. Among the fellowships she has held are the Guggenheim and the Radcliffe Institute Fellowships, and among the awards she has won for her compositions are the Herb Alpert Award in the Arts, the Rome Prize and the first prize of the International Rostrum of Composers. She was on the faculty of the University of Illinois in Urbana as Assistant Professor of Composition-Theory and is currently Associate Professor of Composition at Brandeis University.

== Education ==
In 1997 Gee received her B.M. with honors and highest distinction in Piano Performance from the University of Iowa; there she also earned an M.A. in composition in 2002. In 2007, she earned her Ph.D. in music theory from the University of Music and Dramatic Arts, Graz, Austria where she studied musical composition with Beat Furrer.

== Career ==
With her brother Colin Gee, she performed at the Whitney Museum of Art and was a resident at the Montalvo Arts Center. She won the 2008 Rome Prize and was a Guggenheim Fellow in 2009. From 2010-2011, she was a fellow in composition at the Akademie Schloss Solitude in Stuttgart. In 2015, she received the Charles Ives Fellowship of the American Academy of Arts and Letters. The puzzle video game app Blek contains excerpts of Erin Gee's work. Gee is one of the Kronos Quartet 50 for the Future composers.

A reviewer from the Harvard Gazette described a performance of Gee's work as "a young woman with a microphone in each hand performing a curious and captivating symphony of sound and song".

== Selected works ==
Work	Premiere/Award	Year written
Mouthpiece 34	Premiered at the Centre Pompidou in the “Neurons” Exhibit, Paris, France	2019
Mouthpiece 33	Written for the Argento Ensemble. Premiered at Roulette Intermedium, Brooklyn, NY	2019
Mouthpiece 32	Commissioned by Chamber Music America for the Ensemble Dal Niente	2018
Mouthpiece 31	Commissioned by Kronos Quartet	2017
Mouthpiece 30	Commissioned by and written for Frauke Aulbert, voice Premiered at the Elbphilharmonie, Hamburg, Germany	2017
Mouthpiece 29	Commissioned by and premiered at the Tanglewood Music Center	2016
Mouthpiece 28	Commissioned and premiered by the TAK ensemble Premiered at the Resonant Bodies Festival	2016
Mouthpiece XIXc	Premiered at the NienteForte Festival by the ECCE Ensemble	2016
Mouthpiece XXVII	Commissioned by Musik Protokoll in Steirischer Herbst, Graz Austria. Premiered and recorded by Ensemble NOVA	2016
Mouthpiece XXVI	Commissioned by the Humanities Center at DePaul University	2016
Mouthpiece XXIV	Commissioned by the International Contemporary Ensemble Premiered by Ryan Muncy and Ross Karre at the Abrons Art Center in Brooklyn, NY.	2015
Mouthpiece XXI	Commissioned by Musikprotokoll, Steirischer Herbst, Graz, Austria Premiered by the Arditti Quartet Performed by the JACK Quartet at the Lucerne Festival, Switzerland, the Banff Centre, Canada (2017)	2014
Mouthpiece XIX	Commissioned by the Arnold Schoenberg Center, Vienna Austria Premiered at the Arnold Schoenberg Center in Vienna, Austria	2013/14
Mouthpiece XX	Commissioned by the ORF and premiered by the RSO Wien at the Vienna Konzerthaus, Grosse Saal Conducted by Cornelius Meister Erin Gee, voice Colin Gee, actor/dramaturge Video by Patrick Kelly	2013
“…In the first place…”	Music for Colin Gee’s Dance film commissioned by and premiered at EMPAC, Troy, NY	2012
Mouthpiece XVI	Commissioned by Akademie Schloss Solitude Premiered by the Ascolta Ensemble at Akademie Schloss Solitude, Stuttgart.	2012
Mouthpiece XIV	Commissioned by the Iowa Piano Teacher’s Association. Written for and premiered by Réne Lecuona.	2010
Mouthpiece XIII	Commissioned by the American Composers Orchestra and LVMH. Premiered at Zankel Hall in Carnegie Hall, New York City. Erin Gee, voice Colin Gee, Actor and Dramaturge	2009
Mouthpiece XII	Premiered by Repertorio Zero at the Konzerthaus Zürich in the Tage für Neue Musik, Zürich. Erin Gee, voice	2009
Mouthpiece XI	Commissioned by the LA Philharmonic New Music Group Premiered at the Walt Disney Concert Hall, Los Angeles Conducted by Esa-Pekka Salonen Erin Gee, voice	2009
SLEEP: an opera	Premiered at the Zurich Opera House, 2009. Erin Gee, voice. Morgan Moody, Bass Baritone Teatro Minimo Prize	2008
Sawari Mouthpiece for Koto and Voice	Premiered at the 4020 Festival in Linz, Austria	2008
Mouthpiece X	Premiered at the Wittener Tage für Neue Kammermusik, Witten, Germany in 2009 by Klangforum Wien Erin Gee, voice CD Released on Col Legno 2014	2008
Mouthpiece: Segment of the 4th Letter	Premiered by Ensemble Recherche Gianni Bergamo Prize (1st Round)	2007
Mouthpiece IX	Commissioned by Musik Protokoll, Steirischer Herbst, Graz, Austria and the Klangspuren Festival. Premiered at the Klangspuren Festival by the RSO Wien. Erin Gee, voice. Martyn Brabbins, conductor. Awarded the Rostrum of Composers Prize, Paris, France – 2007 CD Released on Col Legno	2006
Mouthpiece Topology	Premiered by the Latvian Radio Choir Premiered at the Klangspuren Festival, Klagenfurt, Austria	2006
Mouthpiece VIII	Commissioned by MozartJahr 2006 Premiered at the ORF Vienna, Austria. Erin Gee, voice	2006
Yamaguchi Mouthpieces	Premiered at the Akiyoshidai International Art Viliage. Erin Gee, voice Look and Listen Festival Prize, New York City	2005
Mouthpiece VII	Premiered by Klangforum Wien impuls Festival Prize, Graz, Austria Conducted by Johannes Kalitzke. Erin Gee, voice	2004
Mouthpiece VI	Premiered by Klangforum Wien Erin Gee, voice	2004
Mouthpiece III	Premiered by Klangforum Wien	2002
Mouthpiece Remix	Premiered at the Institute for Electronic Music (IEM), Graz, Austria	2003
Mouthpiece II	Premiered at the MATA Festival 2002 Erin Gee, voice	2002
Mouthpiece I	Erin Gee, voice	2001

== Discography ==
Work(s)	Label/Performer/CD	Year
A Howl, That Was Also A Prayer Three Scenes from the Opera, SLEEP	Ekemeles Ensemble	2020
Oor Mouthpiece XXVIII	TAK Ensemble	2019
Mouthpiece XXVII	Hoehenrausch Ensemble NOVA ORF Austrian Broadcasting Corporation	2017
Mouthpiece XXIV	Ryan Muncy ISM	2016
"Mouthpieces" (portrait CD)	col legno label Klangforum Wien PHACE Ensemble	2014
Yamaguchi Mouthpiece Part 3	The Believer Magazine	2011
Mouthpiece IX (parallel version)	102 Masterpieces: ORF Vienna Radio Symphony Orchestra miniatures	2010
Akiguchi Mouthpiece	Wittener Tage für neue Kammermusik	2008
Yamaguchi Mouthpiece	Entspannte Gleichzeitigkeit - Hammer Records	2006

== Selected awards and grants ==
- 2022 Award in Music from the American Academy of Arts and Letters
- 2019 Koussevitsky Award
- 2017 Fromm Foundation Commission
- 2015 American Academy of Arts and Letters, Charles Ives Fellowship Recipient (Charles Ives Prize)
- 2009 John Simon Guggenheim Fellowship, New York City.
- 2007 Rome Prize, The American Academy in Rome, Italy.
- 2007 International Rostrum of Composers “Selected Piece” (First Prize), Paris, France.
- 2007 Teatro Minimo Prize (first round), Zurich Opera House
