= Taylor Brook =

Canadian composer

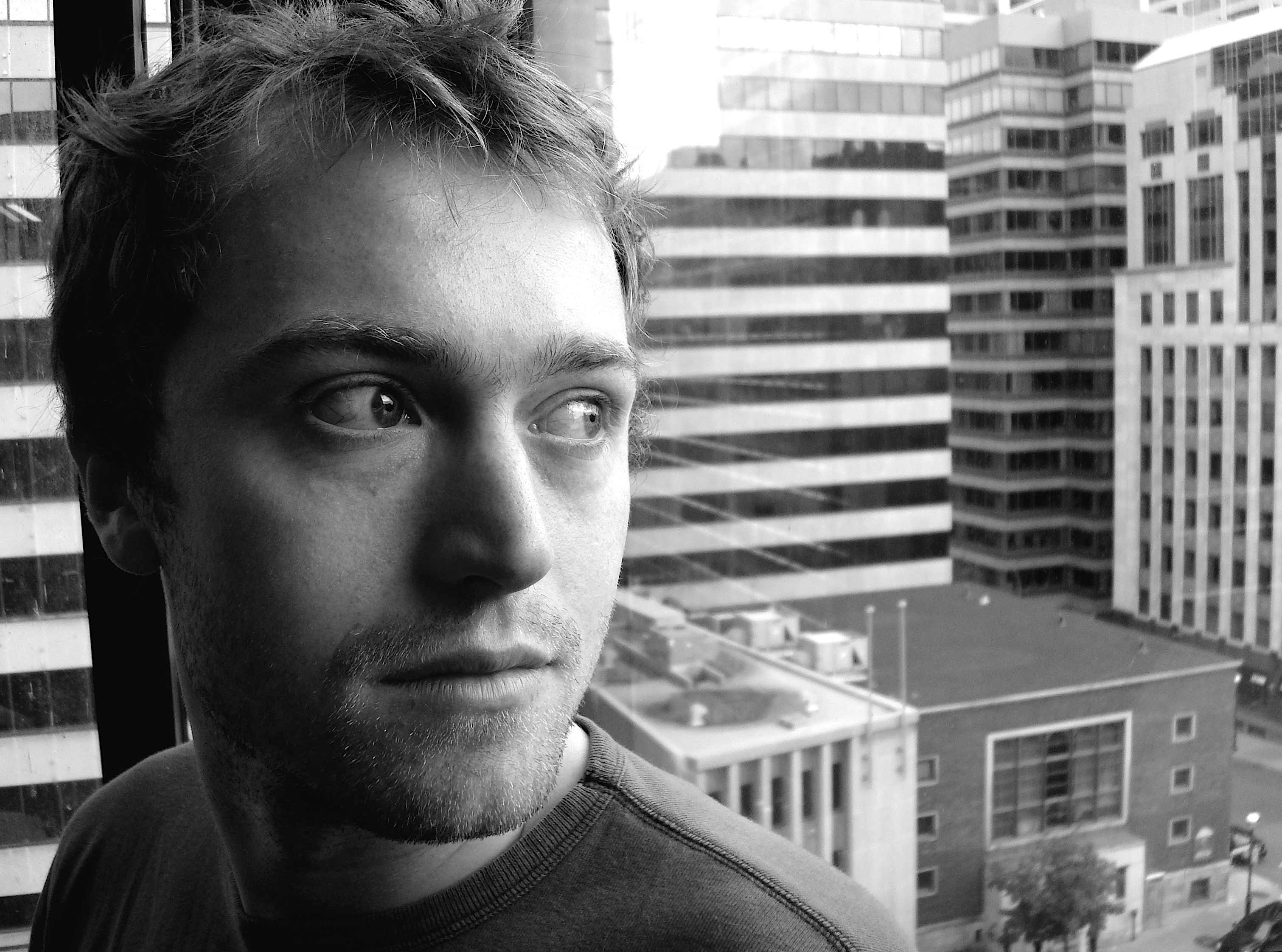
Taylor Brook, August 3, 2007

Taylor Brook (born 1985) is a composer of contemporary classical music who currently resides in Victoria, BC, Canada.

== Education ==
Brook was born in Edmonton but grew up in Toronto, where he attended Etobicoke School of the Arts, a specialized arts-academic public high school. His studies included guitar and violin. He then studied at the Schulich School of Music at McGill University, where he completed his Bachelor of Music degree in 2007 and earned his Master's Degree in Music Composition. For his thesis he composed Mitya, a piece for solo clarinet with 18 musicians and live electronics. It premiered on April 14, 2010, with Mark Bradley of the Portmantô Ensemble as soloist and Denys Bouliane conducting the McGill Contemporary Music Ensemble. His teachers included Brian Cherney, Denys Bouliane, Luc Brewaeys, Ana Sokolović, John Rea, and Sean Ferguson. He earned a Doctor of Musical Arts (DMA) from Columbia University in 2018 and received a Guggenheim Fellowship in 2020.

== Career and compositions ==
In 2008, he spent two months in Kolkata studying at Bhattacharya School of Universal Music with Hindustani musician Pandit Debashish Bhattacharya, studying raga on the chaturangui, a many-stringed slide guitar of Bhattacharya's invention. This exposure influenced subsequent works including his 2009 composition Vocalise, for solo violin accompanied by a drone playing a continuous tone 14 cents flat of F♯. The piece won the 2010 Lee Ettelson Composer's Award from Composers, Inc., whose artistic director is Robert Greenberg.

Another 2009 composition, Murder Ballad, won the coup de cœur prize from le Nouvel Ensemble Moderne.

His composition It’s not dark yet, but it’s getting there won the Society of Composers, Authors and Music Publishers of Canada Young Composers Award for 2010.

For the Nouvel Ensemble Moderne's FORUM 2010, he composed music to accompany the 2010 version of the Les trains où vont les choses series of films by Nathalie Bujold. This piece was awarded the Prix Public and second prize from the jury. (The phrase Les trains où vont les choses is a play on words — "le train de choses" is an idiom for "the way things go" or "that's how it goes." The title is pluralized to reflect the grid of images in the video. The double meaning is from the fact it is filmed from a train window.)

His 2011 composition Against the Morning was commissioned by the Banff Centre. It was inspired by the third movement (Summer Morning by a Lake) of Schoenberg's Five Pieces for Orchestra.

In 2011, Brook studied orchestral composition with Luc Brewaeys in Brussels and Quatuor Bozzini recorded his piece Florescences for their album À chacun sa miniature.

The ArtSpring Arts Center in Salt Spring Island announced in May 2012 that it would host a residency for Brook and Quatuor Bozzini to develop and perform a new evening-length work over the period August 1–7, 2012. The process was captured by Quebec videographer Nathalie Bujold and the audience received a preview of the result on August 4, and participated in its creation.

Brook was a finalist in the 2012 American Composers Forum Finale National Composition Contest September 14, 2012. His entry Arrhythmia was described as "a strikingly modern re-imagining of Mahler’s ninth symphony, lush and ethereal"

He is the technical director of TAK Ensemble, a quintet that performs contemporary classical music, including Brook's.

== Discography ==
- Give My Regards to 116th Street (Carrier Records, 2015)
- Garden of Diverging Paths (New Focus, 2016)
- Ecstatic Music: TAK plays Brook (New Focus, 2016)
- Virtutes Occultae (Self-release, 2017)
- Engage (New Focus, 2018)
- Old Fires Catch Old Buildings (New Focus, 2018)
- Streya (New Focus, 2018)
- The Privacy of Domestic Life (Centrediscs, 2018)
- A Howl That Was Also a Prayer (New Focus, 2020)
- Star Maker Fragments (TAK editions, 2021)

== See also ==
- List of 21st-century classical composers
