= Marina Kifferstein =

American violinist, composer, improviser, and educator

Marina Kifferstein (born July 19, 1989) is a violinist, composer, improviser, and educator based in New York City. She is a member of contemporary classical quintet TAK ensemble, The Rhythm Method string quartet, and electronic noise project xbucket.

== Education ==
Born and raised in Manhattan, Kifferstein attended New York City's School for Strings and went on to major in both violin performance and English as part of Oberlin College and Conservatory's double degree program, where she studied with violinist Milan Vitek. She continued her studies at Manhattan School of Music's Contemporary Performance Program, studying with Laurie Smukler and Curtis Macomber. She is currently pursuing a doctorate of Musical Arts at the Graduate Center, CUNY.

== Career ==
In 2013 Kifferstein co-founded TAK ensemble, a contemporary quintet based in New York City, where she also co-founded The Rhythm Method, an experimental string quartet, in 2014. She is a frequent guest with ensembles such as the International Contemporary Ensemble, Talea Ensemble, Wet Ink Ensemble, Da Capo Chamber Players, and the Ensemble of Lucerne Festival Alumni.

As a writer, Kifferstein has contributed to I Care If You Listen, Wet Ink Ensemble's Wet Ink Archive, and Q2 Music.

Kifferstein teaches at the United Nations International School and is on faculty at The Composers Conference summer festival.

== Personal life ==
Kifferstein uses she/they pronouns.

== Discography ==
- Ecstatic Music: TAK play Brook (New Focus Records, 2016)
- Chance Monsoon – Dai Fujikura (Minabel, 2017)
- Torrent – Wet Ink Ensemble (Sound American, 2017)
- Sanctuary (Denovali, 2018)
- Wet Ink: 20 – Wet Ink Ensemble (Carrier Records, 2018)
- The Rhythm Method: A Very Wandelweiser Christmas Vol. I (Self-released, 2018)
- Oor (TAK editions, 2019)
- Ghost Layers (New Focus Records, 2020)
- Open Improvisations (Self-released, 2020)
- The Rhythm Method: A Very Wandelweiser Christmas Vol. II (Self-released, 2020)
- Terrain – Jacob Cooper (New Amsterdam, 2020)
- A Few Concerns – Meaghan Burke & The Rhythm Method (Gold Bolus Recordings, 2021)
- Star Maker Fragments (TAK editions, 2021)
- The Rhythm Method - The Rhythm Method (Gold Bolus Recordings, 2022)
- Pastorale - The Rhythm Method (New Focus Recordings, 2024)
- Seaglass: Works for String Quartet - Carrie Frey & The Rhythm Method(Gold Bolus Recordings, 2025)
