= Delian Academy =

Δήλια Ακαδημία Νέας Μουσικής
- Cyclades

Information
- Type: Music School
- Established: 2017
- Founder: Alexandros Spyrou
- Honorary President: Georges Aperghis
- Gender: Mixed
- Website: website

The Delian Academy for New Music (Greek: Δήλια Ακαδημία Νέας Μουσικής) is an international music institute located in Cyclades, Greece, specializing in educational and artistic programs designed for composers and sound artists. The institute is operating under the honorary presidency of composer Georges Aperghis, and takes its name from the historic island of Delos, associated with the birthplace of the Greek god Apollo and recognized as a UNESCO World Heritage Site.

== History ==
The institute was founded in 2017 by Alexandros Spyrou who serves as artistic director. According to him, the goal of the institute is to provide composers and sound artists with a platform to advance their musical education and engage in creative exploration. Greek composer Georges Aperghis has been serving as the honorary president of the academy.

In 2019, Klangforum Wien and New York-based TAK ensemble participated in Delian Academy for an annual international meeting of musicians and composers.

== Faculty ==
- Michael Finnissy
- Beat Furrer
- Panayiotis Kokoras
- Franck Bedrossian
- Elainie Lillios
- Samir Odeh-Tamimi
- Dimitri Papageorgiou
- Josh Levine

== Ensembles in residence ==
- Klangforum Wien
- Trio Accanto
- TAK ensemble
- Oerknal ensemble
- Zone Expérimentale
- Proxima Centauri
- Awkas Ensemble
