= Windosill =

2009 video game

Windosill (Vectorpark)
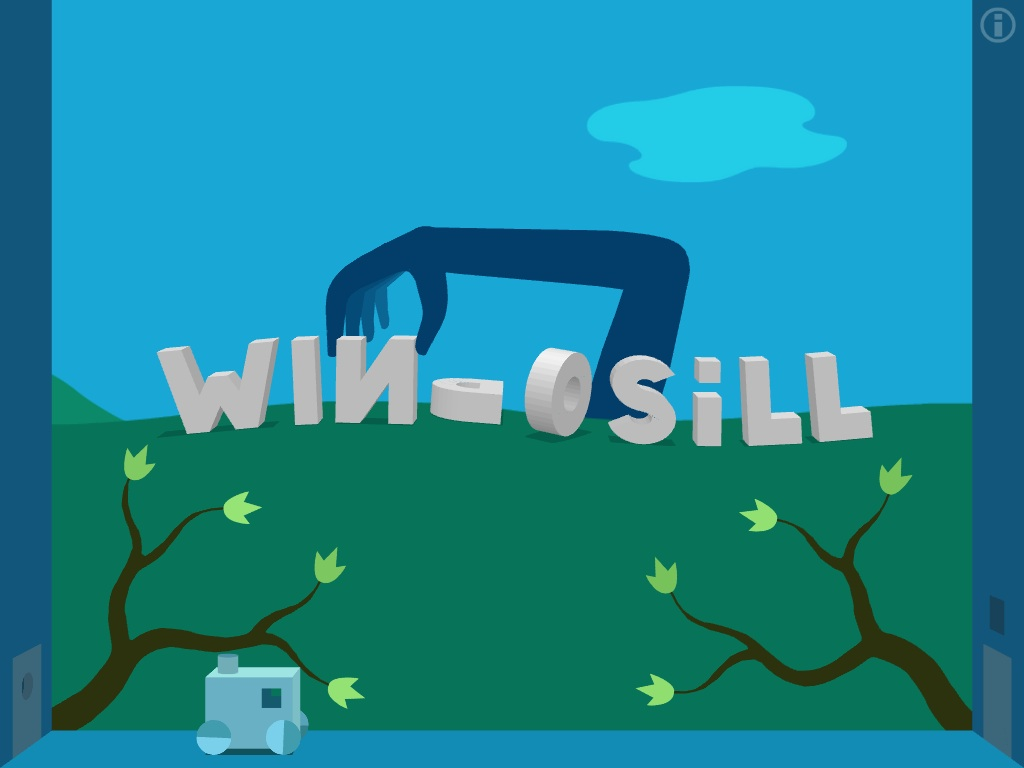
- Title screen
- Developer: Vectorpark
- Publisher: Vectorpark
- Designer: Patrick Smith
- Platforms: Windows, OS X, Linux, browser, iOS
- Release: Windows, OS X, browser: WW: May 26, 2009; iOS: WW: December 15, 2011; Switch: WW: November 11, 2022
- Genre: Puzzle
- Mode: Single-player

Windosill is a 2009 puzzle video game by Vectorpark for Microsoft Windows, OS X, Linux, web browsers, and iOS. The player advances through eleven different rooms by interacting with each level's environmental objects.

The game was developed by Patrick Smith, an artist who taught himself to animate and program the game in (the now technically defunct) Adobe Flash. He was inspired by a variety of painters and artists. The game was first released for Windows, OS X, and web browsers in 2009, and was later ported to the iPad (running iOS) in 2011, with several added features.

The game received "universal acclaim" according to video game review score aggregator Metacritic. Reviewers noted the game's especially short duration, memorability, art style, and emphasis on exploration over problem solving. Windosill has influenced games such as Alto's Adventure, Blek, Donut County, and Monument Valley.

In 2022, the planned release of Windosill as a Nintendo Switch eShop title was announced.

== Gameplay ==
In Windosill, the player solves logic puzzles to progress through eleven successive room levels. Everything on-screen is interactive. The player experiments with the environmental objects in each room to find a hidden cube, which unlocks the door to the next level, through which the player guides a toy car. Responsive objects in each room include light switches, piles of leaves, clocks, "a squishy thing with an eye on top", a building that grows legs when spun, a box that grows hair when touched, and a smokestack that can be squeezed to make clouds. Interactions with these objects reveal subsequent objects and possible interactions.

In Windosill, the player interacts with the environment of a room to find a cube that unlocks the next room.

== Development ==
Patrick Smith, a Brooklyn-based artist, drew, animated, and programmed Windosill by himself with Adobe Flash for Microsoft Windows, OS X, Linux, web browser, and iPad (iOS) platforms. His collection of interactive animations and games, which he began around 2001, are released under the name "Vectorpark". Although Edge previously covered and praised Smith's prior work, they wrote that he "is notable for never having made the jump to the mainstream".

Patrick Smith first sketched Windosill level ideas in pencil, and transferred his favorites into Adobe Illustrator, where he added detail, "shapes and colors". He then animated and programmed the scenes in Adobe Flash, and incorporated sounds from Freesound. While Smith studied painting at Washington University, he learned to animate and program on his own. He developed his own 3D and physics code instead of using existing software libraries, as he prefers to use code he fully understands. When Smith built the game, he considered the "aesthetic and functional aspects holistically".

Smith's main inspirations when creating Windosill were mainly artists and not games: surrealists René Magritte and Joan Miró, metaphysical painter Giorgio de Chirico, animators Max and Dave Fleischer of Fleischer Studios, cartoonists Chris Ware and Jim Woodring, sculptor Alexander Calder, and Italian Renaissance painters Paolo Uccello and Piero della Francesca. Smith credits the latter painters for his use of flat shapes as 3D forms. Windosill was not designed for a specific audience—in fact, Smith designed them for his own enjoyment—but he noted that its "toy-like" qualities and emphasis on discovery were intentional.

Windosill was originally released in 2009 as a downloadable Flash game for Microsoft Windows and OS X. In this version, the first half of Windosill was free-to-play, and its second half could be unlocked with payment. Smith was satisfied with Windosill's sales, but said "it will take a long time to fund itself". An iOS (iPad-only) port was released on December 15, 2011, and added two features: Complex Gravity (which adds "tilt controls") and See-Thru (which makes the room's elements transparent). It also includes a 20-piece collection of concept art.

The game was included in the April 2012, Amanita Design Humble Bundle.

== Reception ==
Reception

Aggregate score
Aggregator	Score
Metacritic	90/100 (4 reviews)

Review scores
Publication	Score
148 Apps	4.5/5
Slide to Play	4/4
TouchArcade	4.5/5

The game received "universal acclaim", according to video game review score aggregator Metacritic. Reviewers noted the game's especially short duration, memorability, and emphasis on exploration over problem solving. Multiple reviewers praised the game's art style. Nissa Campbell of TouchArcade described the style as "surreal", and Tim Rattray of Slide to Play wrote that Windosill is "serious" in its attempt to "be 'art'". Critics described Windosill as not just a game but "a toy" in itself. GameSetWatch selected the game for their "Best of Indie Games" the week of May 2, 2009.

Windosill inspired indie mobile games such as the 2013 puzzle game Blek (pictured).

Campbell of TouchArcade wrote that the iOS port was "always meant to be" due to the tactility of the game's puzzles. Campbell added that iOS multitouch changed how players could interact with the puzzles, though it did not change any of the solutions. The reviewer wrote that the controls were intuitive and designed for experimenting, as there is no tutorial. Kirk Hamilton of Kotaku similarly wrote that the game helped him remember "how wonderfully tactile the iPad can be".

Rattray of Slide to Play described Windosill as "an interactive abstract mosaic" and "absolute thrill ride". He described the puzzle design and production value as "brilliant", and praised the "fitting" sound effects, "smooth" controls, and "perfect" frame rate. 148Apps's Dan Lee also called the puzzles "brilliant", and described them as "so abstract" as to require unconventional thinking. Anthony Burch of Destructoid added that the puzzles were designed such that players would not become "frustrated or bored". Lee and Rattray said there was little reason to return to the game after playing through, apart from a few minutes to experiment with the added iOS features. While Lee considered this a "niggle", Rattray praised its brevity.

Windosill has influenced games including Alto's Adventure, Blek, Donut County, and Monument Valley. Smith later made the 2015 interactive alphabet game Metamorphabet.
