= Blek =

2013 puzzle video game

- App icon
- Developer: kunabi brother
- Publisher: kunabi brother
- Engine: Unity
- Platforms: iOS, Android, Wii U
- Release: December 2013
- Genre: Puzzle
- Mode: Single-player

Blek is a 2013 puzzle video game for iOS and Android by kunabi brother, a team of brothers Denis and Davor Mikan. The player draws a snakelike black line that recurs in pattern and velocity across the screen to remove colored dots and avoid black dots. It is minimalist in design, features excerpts of Erin Gee, and takes inspiration from Golan Levin, the Bauhaus, and Japanese calligraphy. The brothers designed the game as a touchscreen adaptation of the Snake concept and worked on the game for over six months. It was released in December 2013 for iPad, and was later released for other iOS devices and Android.

The game received positive reviews, and critics praised the game's degree of unrestricted play. The game reached the top of the Apple App Store charts several months after its release. It received a 2014 Apple Design Award, and has sold over one million copies.

== Gameplay ==
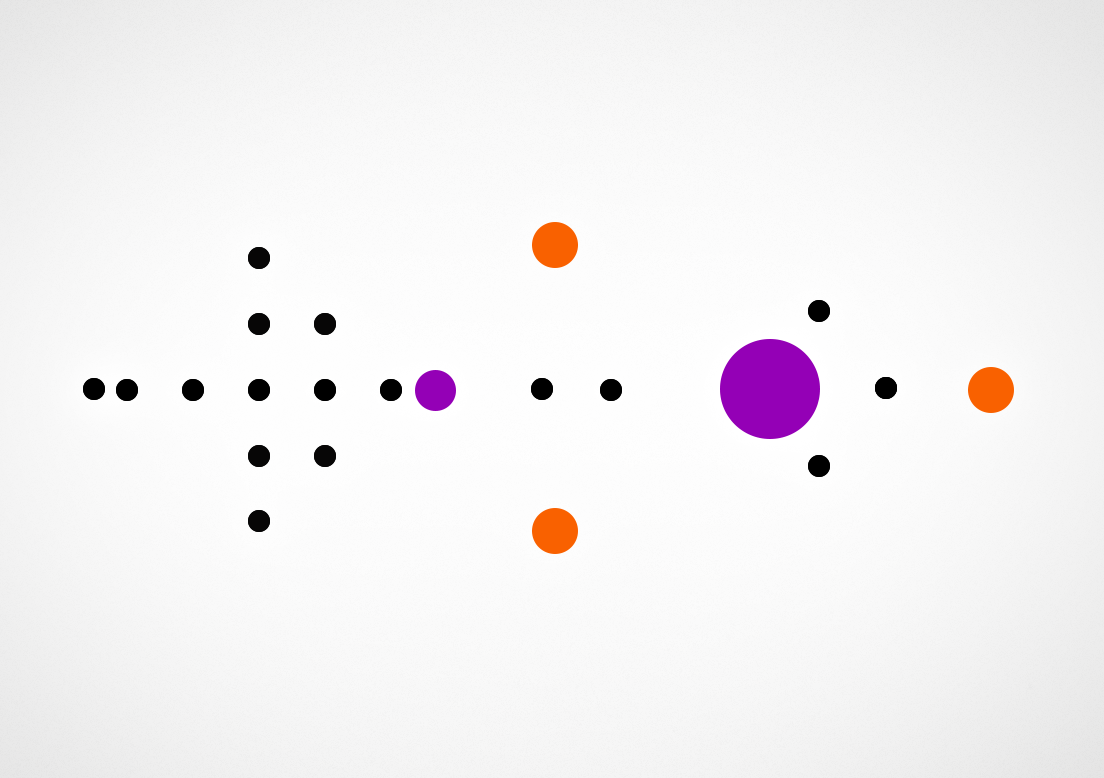
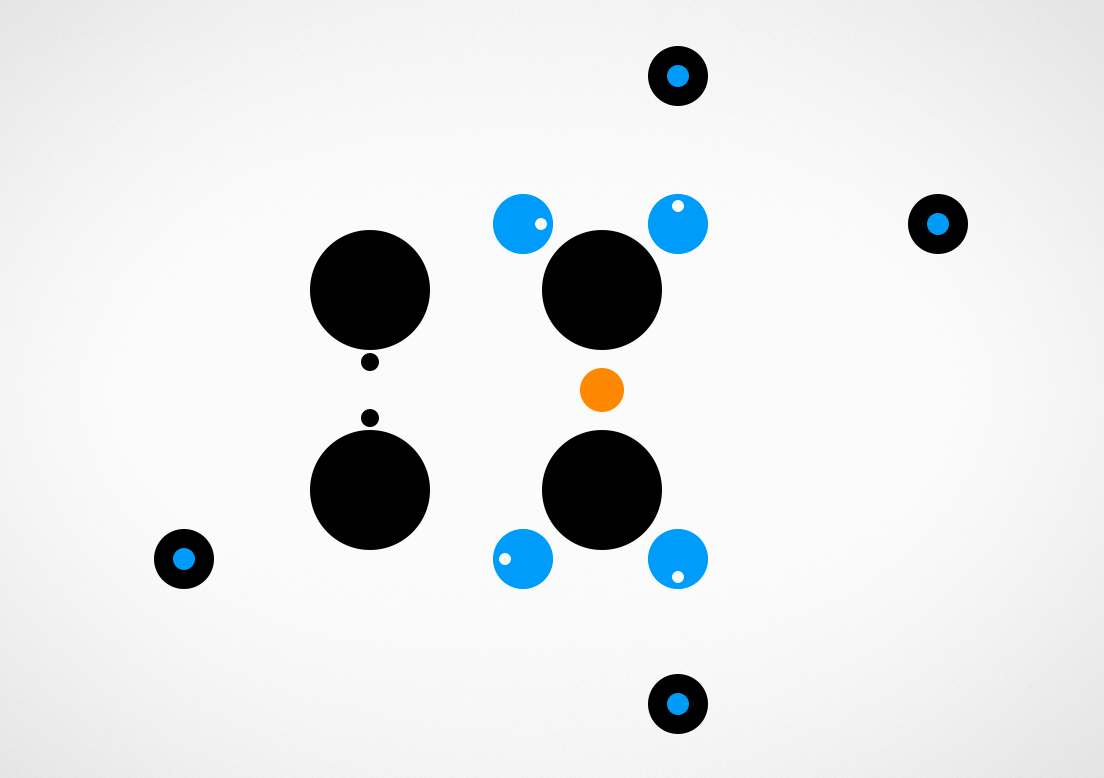
Trailer and examples of puzzles

Blek is a puzzle game in which the player draws a "snake-like" black line on the screen that is recorded and played back like a pattern, recurring repeatedly across the screen. The object is to draw a line such that it will remove colored dot targets when it repeats across the screen without hitting a black dot. Lines that travel off the top or bottom of the screen reset the level, while lines that travel off the left or right of the screen reflect back towards the dots. Aside from repeating the player's drawn pattern, the stroke mimics the player's pace in drawing the stroke.

The game begins with no prompt or tutorial other than to use a finger on the screen and experiment. The first puzzles are "on open, white canvasses" where the player can solve the simple puzzles "by accident". The 80 levels progress in difficulty and require more complex solutions. Added elements include a "chain reaction" dot that launches other dots when struck. Its sound consists of a "whoosh" that accompanies the traveling stroke, a "chime" when colored dots are hit, and a human "disappointed grumble" when black dots are hit, resetting the level.

The game is depicted in flat, plain colors, with no pause feature and no option menu other than Game Center achievements. Players navigate between puzzles using three small onscreen icons. There are no in-app purchases or in-game advertisements.

== Development ==
Blek was built for iOS by brothers Denis and Davor Mikan. While both had coding experience, neither had experience in game development. This was their first game together as kunabi brother. Denis had published short stories and a novel, and Davor released music on independent media label Crónica Electrónica. Davor previously made Flash games and developed the idea for Blek from this experience. He approached Denis about converting the video game Snake for touchscreens, and Denis returned with the idea of "a line representing an idea that springs to life after it has been drawn". This thought was likely inspired by the calligraphy and ink drawings in a book by Japanese poet Matsuo Bashō that Denis was reading. They had several prototypes by mid-2013, when Davor joined a Parisian artist in residence program, where he felt he was treated differently when he introduced himself as a game developer instead of as a musician. This experience invigorated his interest in the game medium and led to the brothers' push to finish the game over the next six months.

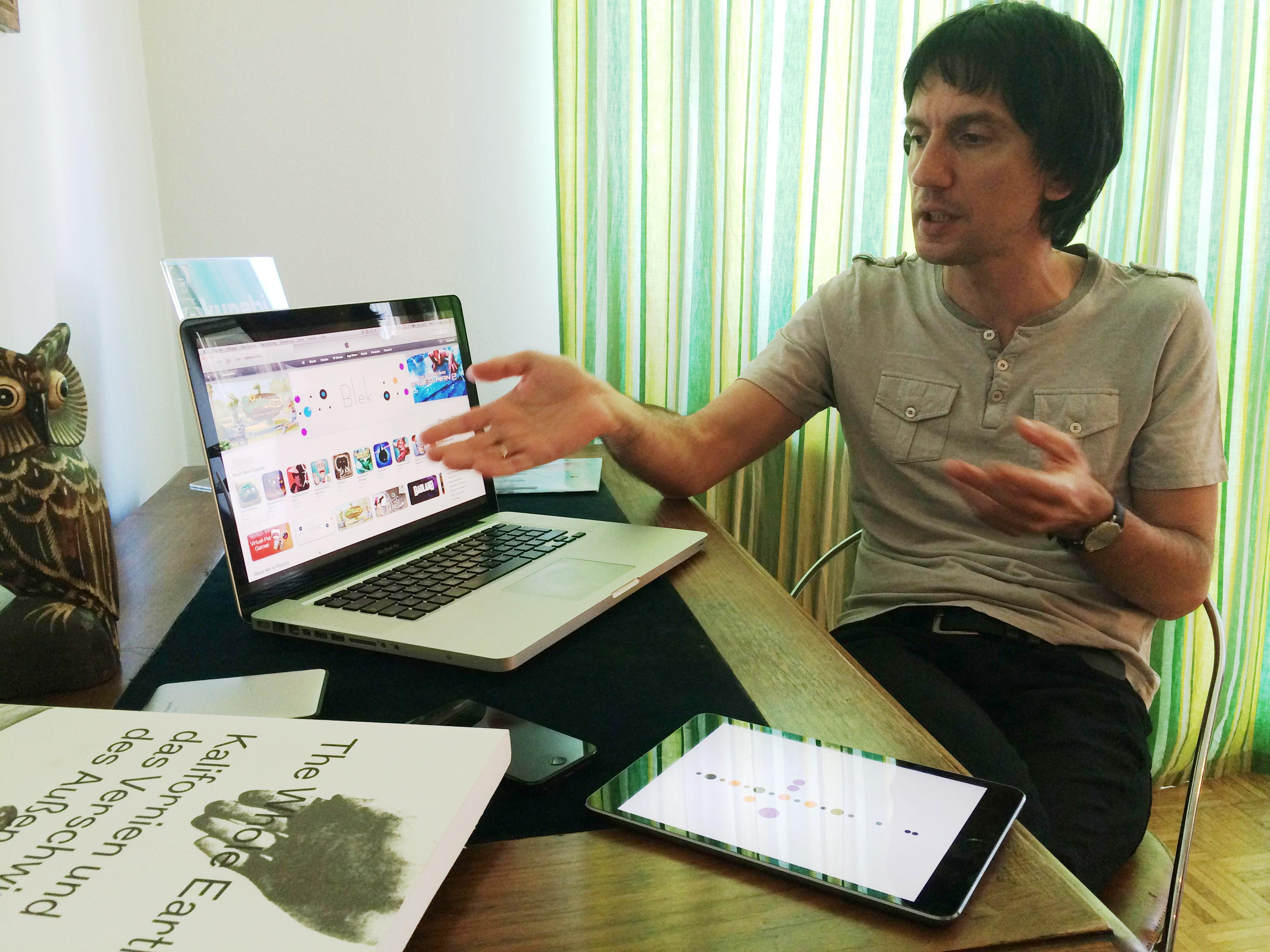
Blek producer Denis Mikan

The Austrian brothers' main influences were Golan Levin's 1998 interactive Yellowtail and Wassily Kandinsky's Point and Line to Plane book, from his time teaching at the Bauhaus. The sound design uses excerpts from Erin Gee's "Yamaguchi Mouthpiece I", and their game design influences include Thatgamecompany and Patrick Smith of Vectorpark and Windosill, though they felt that other games did not singularly influence Blek's design. They were interested in video games as toys and "as meaningful experiences". The game was written in the Unity game engine and tested by the developers' friends. Since the core game mechanics were set, their feedback pertained to the level design. As their primary interests were in a "unification of art, craft, and technology", the game had no public relations or marketing campaign and its creators expressed little interest in the app's business and marketing, though they did share the game directly with media outlets.

Blek was released for iPad in December 2013, and an iPhone and iPod Touch version followed on January 7, 2014. Four months after the release, they reinvested their earnings from the game into marketing. After a few YouTube campaigns, Blek was listed in Apple's App Store lists. An Android version was released in July. Kunabi Brother are not planning a sequel, though they intend to further "experiment with touchscreens".

== Reception ==
Reception

Aggregate score
Aggregator	Score
Metacritic	iOS: 78/100; WIIU: 75/100

Review scores
Publication	Score
Edge	8/10
Eurogamer	8/10
TouchArcade	iOS: 4/5

Blek received "generally favorable reviews", according to video game review score aggregator Metacritic. Though the game first released in December 2013 to little fanfare, critics "widely praised" the game, and it became popular in April 2014. It appeared in the top ten paid App Store games chart in April, reached the top by May, and was listed into June. Blek received a 2014 Apple Design Award and was featured in their Indie Game Showcase. While it had sold 30,000 copies by February 2014, upon being featured in the App Store, it sold 500,000 copies by May, and over a million copies by June. Edge compared its aesthetic to iOS puzzle game Hundreds. Reviewers praised the game for the amount of freedom it affords its players.

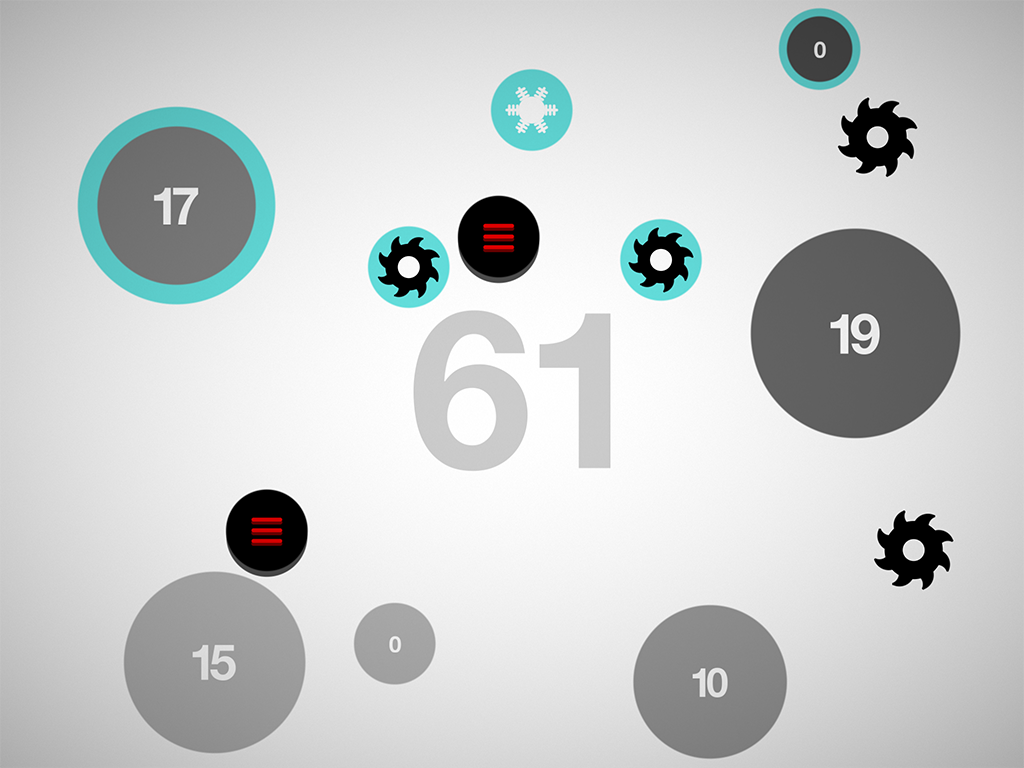
Edge compared the game's aesthetic to Hundreds, another iOS puzzle game

Edge called Blek "a thing of elegant, intuitive beauty". They compared it to a "modernist, freeform, touchscreen" Snake, albeit much calmer, and described Blek as less a puzzle game than "pure intuition" and "an act of freeform creation" that privileged the process of experimentation over the goal of solving puzzles. The magazine wrote that the trial and error, muddling process of refining one's stroke led to delightful discoveries that turned "maddening" complex prospects into "natural" solutions. In a piece for Polygon, Rod Green compared Blek to Tetris and Threes! as a "simple premise, beautifully executed" that lends towards imitation, and added that the game would be harder to "clone" than the others due to its handmade levels. (Note: The game later was cloned, with some examples including Blek in their titles.) Kotaku's Mike Fahey called it "the most brilliant iPad game" he played in 2013.

Christian Donlan of Eurogamer wrote that the game is personal. He compared its core mechanics to handwriting and doodling, noting that the recurring stroke also captures the player's "speed and hesitancy". Donlan wrote that the game is "lots of kinds of puzzle games" as the player may read negative spacing or try to predict the motion of a reflected stroke, and compared the later stages to mazes or minefields. Shaun Musgrave of TouchArcade noted that the game's difficulty increases around level 20, where player precision is required, and considered this part a low point. He felt that the small margin of error in later levels lent towards frustration. Jared Nelson of the same website wrote that the game was uniquely suited for the touchscreen.

== Notes and references ==
Notes
