= Mary Leigh Blek =

American activist

Mary Leigh Blek is a gun control advocate from California. She serves as president emeritus of the Million Mom March and is a spokesperson for the national grassroots network of Million Mom chapters.

Blek became involved in gun control legislation after her son was murdered. In June 1994, her son Matthew Blek was confronted by three armed teenagers, and subsequently shot and killed.

Blek and her husband Charles founded the Orange County Citizens for the Prevention of Gun Violence in 1995. Blek later became the western regional organizer for the Million Mom March in 2000. Blek was also the co-founder and president of the Bell Campaign, a grassroots organization in Orange County, California, dedicated to the prevention of gun deaths and injuries. She frequently provides testimony before local, state, and federal legislators.

Her husband Charles is a member of the Lincoln Club of Orange County.
