= Alto's Adventure =

2015 video game

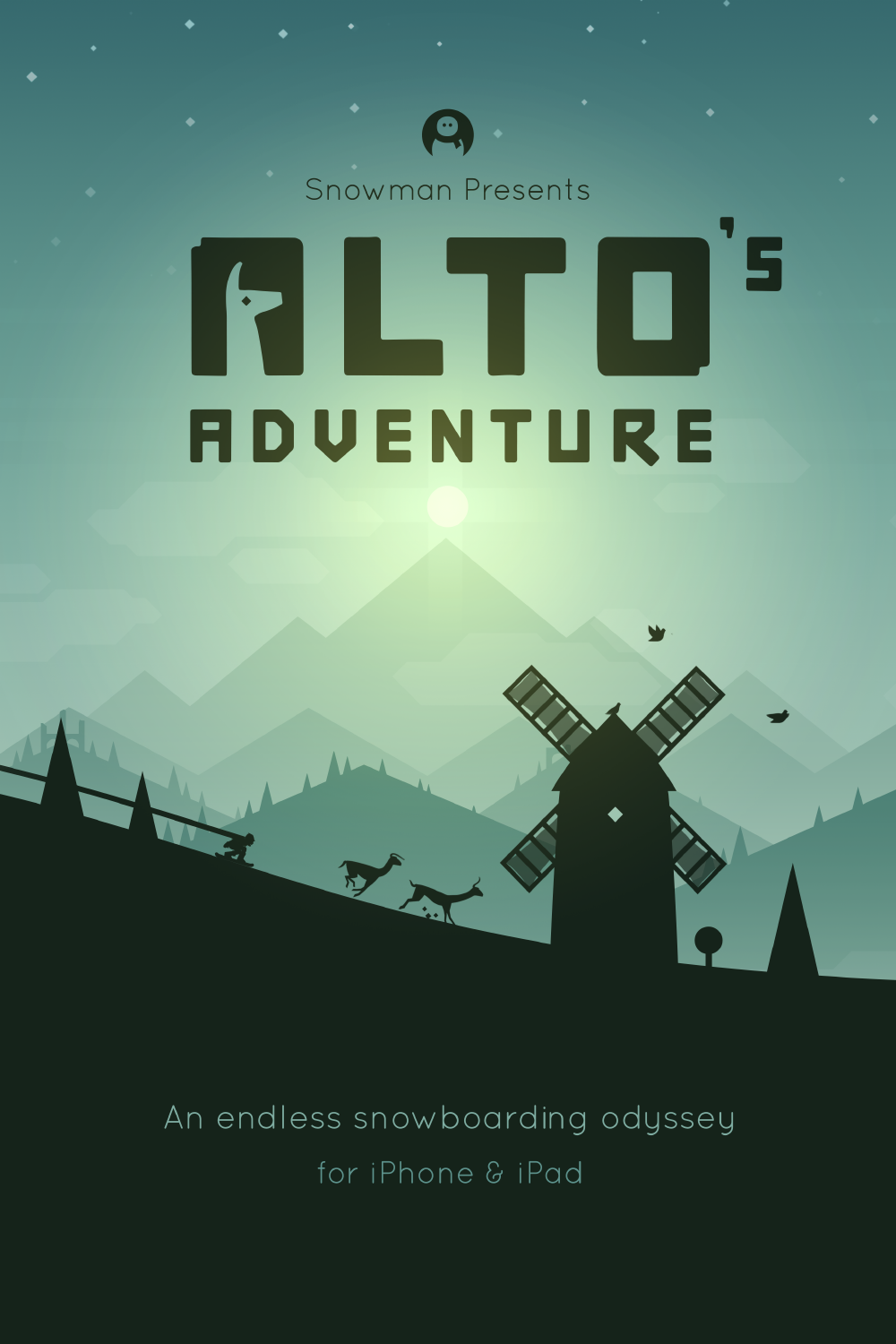
- Developer: Team Alto
- Publishers: Noodlecake Studios (Android), Snowman (iOS)
- Director: Ryan Cash
- Producer: Jordan Rosenberg
- Programmer: Harry Nesbitt
- Artist: Harry Nesbitt
- Engine: Unity
- Platforms: iOS; tvOS; Android; Android TV; Kindle Fire; Linux; Microsoft Windows; macOS; PlayStation 4; Xbox One; Nintendo Switch
- Release: February 19, 2015: iOS; February 19, 2015; tvOS; October 30, 2015; Android, Kindle Fire; February 11, 2016; Windows, Linux; July 8, 2016; macOS; September 23, 2018; PlayStation 4, Xbox One; August 13, 2020; Nintendo Switch; November 26, 2020
- Genres: Endless runner, snowboarding
- Mode: Single-player

Alto's Adventure is a 2015 endless runner snowboarding video game developed by Team Alto and published by Snowman (iOS) and Noodlecake Studios (Android). The player-character automatically moves to the right of the screen through procedurally generated landscapes. The player taps the screen to jump and perform tricks (backflips), and works towards goals, competitive high scores, and upgrades. Snowman, a Toronto-based, three-person indie development team, previously worked on productivity apps before Alto's Adventure. The game was made to emulate the ethereal atmosphere of snowboarding, and was inspired by Ski Safari (2012), Tiny Wings (2012), Jetpack Joyride (2011), Journey (2012), Monument Valley (2014), Tony Hawk's Pro Skater 2 (2000), and Windosill (2009).

The game was released on February 19, 2015, initially for iOS devices. In September that year, Snowman announced that Alto's Adventure would launch on Android and Kindle Fire. The game was released for Android on February 11, 2016. On July 8, 2016, the game was released for the Windows platform.

According to review score aggregator Metacritic, the game received universal acclaim from critics. Reviewers praised its art style and sense of atmosphere but criticized its gameplay for too little originality. Pocket Gamer awarded the game their Gold Award. A sequel, Alto's Odyssey, was released in 2018.

== Gameplay ==
Gameplay trailer

Alto's Adventure is a side-scrolling endless runner snowboarding game. The player character moves automatically through procedurally generated landscapes towards the right side of the screen and the player can only control when to jump. The player taps the screen once to jump and holds the screen while the player character is midair to perform tricks. While the character moves across the landscape, the player can complete some of the game's 180 goals, though they are given only three at a time. Goals include such things as traveling a set distance, rescuing runaway llamas, crossing dangerous gaps, grinding across rooftops of villages, and outsmarting the mountain elders. The player receives awards from completing goals, and can also collect coins that can be used to purchase upgrades. Players perform tricks in quick succession, or combos, to earn points towards a competitive high score. The game also tracks distance traveled and trick combos. Later in the game, players can use a wingsuit, which changes some elements of the game. The environments of Alto's Adventure change in lighting as time passes through the cycle of the day, and incorporate various weather effects. Player progress syncs between iPads and iPhones over iCloud, and the game uses Game Center leaderboards.

== Development ==
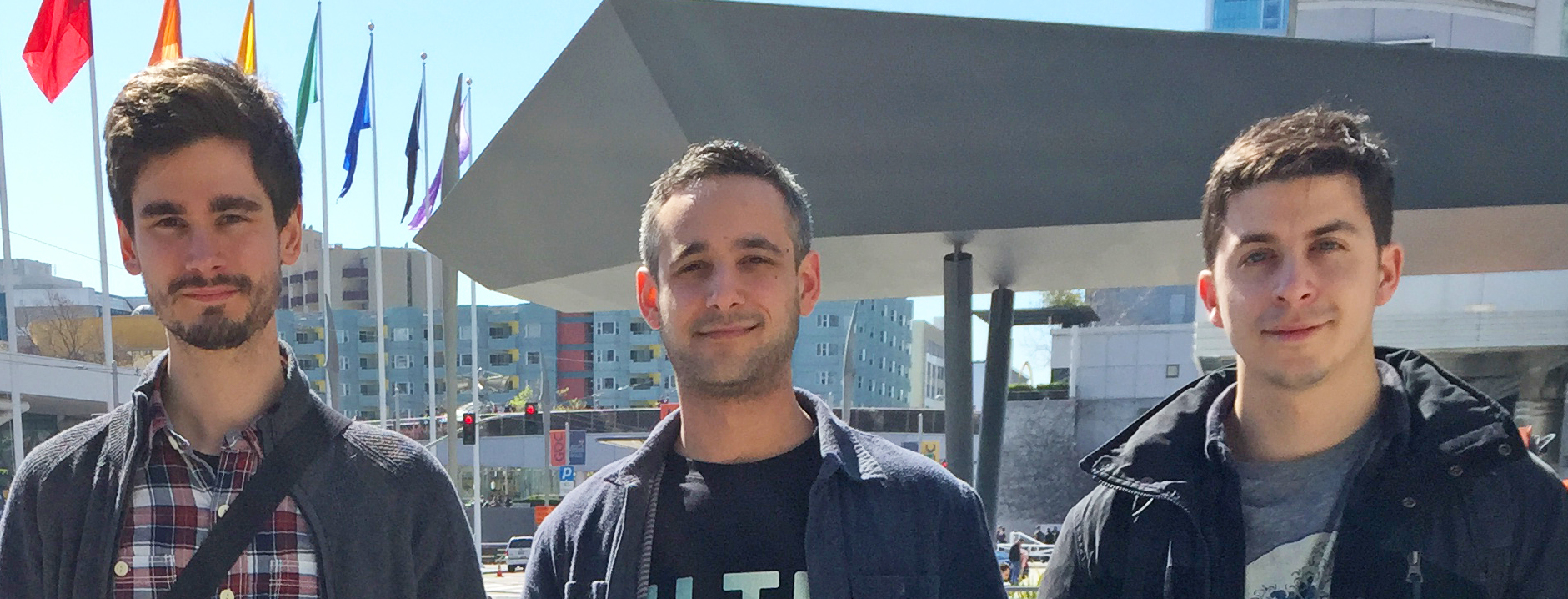
Harry Nesbitt (left) and Snowman at GDC 2015

Alto's Adventure was built in collaboration between Snowman, an indie development studio based in Toronto, and lead artist and programmer Harry Nesbitt, based in Devon, England, a collaboration known as Team Alto. Nesbitt has since gone on to found the studio Land & Sea to encompass a growing team of developers that continue to support the game and its sequel.

The developers intended the game to "capture the flow and feeling of snowboarding" and the way "everything else sort of just disappears" when "in rhythm with the mountain", unlike other snowboarding games. Team Alto also sought to address how other mobile games emphasize video game console-type elements with on-screen controls, which Snowman's co-founder Ryan Cash felt were largely not designed with the mobile platform in mind.

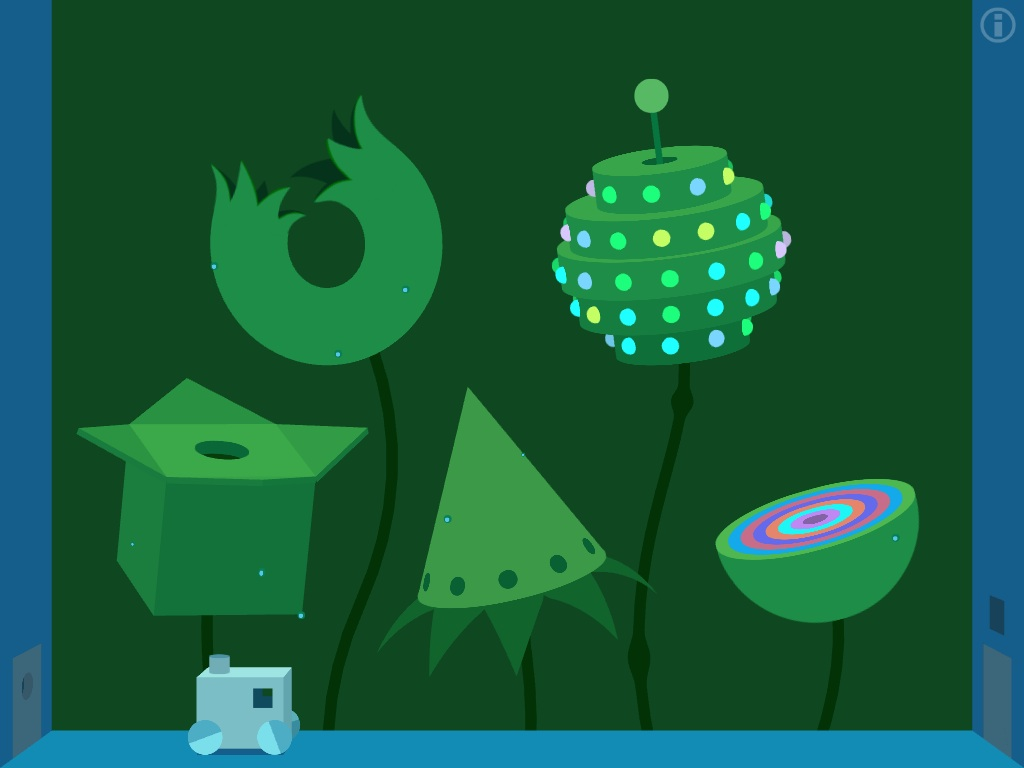
Alto's Adventure was inspired, in part, by Windosill (pictured).

Alto's Adventure was inspired by Journey (2012), Tony Hawk's Pro Skater 2 (2000), and Windosill (2009). Snowman's co-founders, Ryan Cash and Jordan Rosenberg, wanted to bring the essence of the Tony Hawk games of their youth into Alto's Adventure, including "fun, positive goals" and an "easy to learn, hard to master" trick system. They avoided goals from other endless runners that they considered negative, uninteresting, or repetitive. As inspired by Monument Valley (2014), the developers chose to charge above average for the game as a trade-off for not including offsets like in-game advertisements or in-app purchases. Team Alto has said any new content would be as an expansion along the lines of Monument Valley's "Forgotten Shores". The game was released for iOS on February 19, 2015.

A port for Android and Kindle Fire was announced in September later that year. The app was released for those platforms on February 11, 2016. Team Alto collaborated with Noodlecake Studios to make the Android port. Additionally, unlike the iOS version, which is launched as a "premium app" (which requires the user to pay $2.99 to download), the Android version is free to download. In an interview with The Verge, Ryan Cash of Snowman explained that their decision to make the Android Alto's Adventure free is due to iOS and Android being on a "completely different ecosystem", and mainly because of the bigger piracy issues on Android apps. Additionally, he said that those using the Android port will have the same experience as those playing Alto's in the iOS.

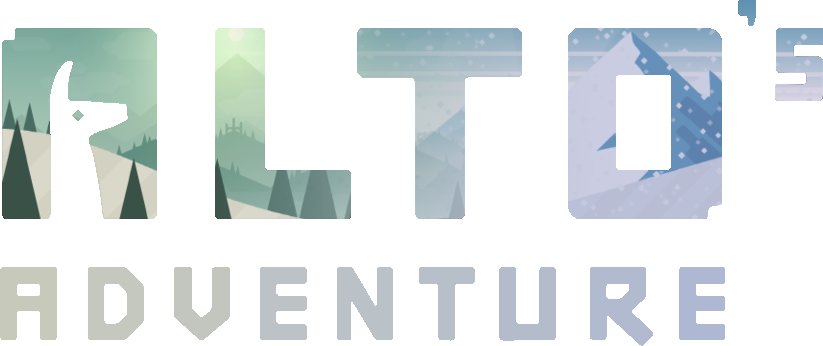
Logo of the game as seen on promo trailer

On August 4, 2019, Team Alto announced that Alto's Adventure, alongside its sequel Alto's Odyssey, would be released for Microsoft Windows, PlayStation 4, and Xbox One on August 13, 2020, as part of The Alto Collection. A Nintendo Switch version was released on November 26, 2020.

On March 25, 2022, Team Alto released an expansion for Apple Arcade titled Alto's Adventure: Spirit Of The Mountain. This version included the base game, plus new goals, abilities, and a new character named Pitu.

== Reception ==
Reception

Aggregate score
Aggregator	Score
Metacritic	92/100

Review scores
Publication	Score
Gamezebo	5/5
Pocket Gamer	9/10
TouchArcade	4.5/5

The game received "universal acclaim", according to video game review score aggregator website Metacritic. Reviewers had high praise for its art style and aesthetics but criticized its gameplay as unoriginal. Pocket Gamer awarded the game their Gold Award.

The Verge's Andrew Webster wrote that the game was a "supremely laid back" and "incredibly relaxing experience". He wrote that this "next great iPad game" was already one of his mobile favorites, and is set apart from others by its "style" and "achingly beautiful" mountain landscape. Webster found Alto's Adventure to be part art game and part "fun little time waster", and compared it to a combination of Sword & Sworcery and Tiny Wings. TouchArcade's Jared Nelson likened its art style to Journey and its gameplay to Ski Safari. While he did not find the game challenging, he enjoyed the "incredible" visuals: "tons of tiny details", like the character animations and changes in lighting and weather, contributed. Nelson also characterized TouchArcade readers' impressions as "highly positive".

Reviewers were impressed by the game's atmosphere.

Eric Ford, also of TouchArcade, found the gameplay "basic" as well—"not much here that truly innovates within the genre"—but felt that the game was worth experiencing for its "excellent visual style and soundtrack". He, too, compared the gameplay to Ski Safari and wrote that while the game's power-ups, quest objectives, currency, and score were "pretty standard", the trick system was praiseworthy and gave even easy tricks a sense of "accomplishment". Ford was not enticed by the available upgrades and wrote that he played not for the upgrades but for the game's "whole look and feel" that was made to feel like more than a game with its "awesome", "mellow", and "soothing" soundtrack. Ford added that the game earned "its hype" from its "amazing art style and visual effects" rather than from its gameplay. He was impressed with how much the dynamic weather changed the feel of the game even while the gameplay went unchanged. Ford predicted that players would respond to Alto's Adventure either in appreciation of its "sheer amount of artistic integrity and nuanced visuals," or in disappointment by its similarity to previous endless runners.

Harry Slater of Pocket Gamer thought the game was "pretty special" and "among the best on the App Store". He thought its "stunningly simple" gameplay to be a "compulsive and engaging experience" and "bloody good fun", though he found its core mechanics unoriginal. Eli Cymet of GameZebo said he wanted to live in the game's world and praised its "total, uncompromising dedication to the atmosphere" and how every choice felt "made to preserve experiential authenticity."

== Sequel ==
A sequel, Alto's Odyssey, was released for iOS in February 2018 and Android in July 2018. It keeps the same gameplay as the original, this time set in a desert with three biomes.
