= PlayStation =

Sony's video gaming brand

- Logo used since 2008
- Product type: Video game console (home, handheld and microconsole); Production company (PlayStation Productions; films and TV series)
- Current owner: Sony Interactive Entertainment
- Country: Minami-Aoyama, Minato, Tokyo, Japan
- Introduced: December 3, 1994; 31 years ago
- Markets: Worldwide
- Registered as a trademark in: Worldwide
- Tagline: "Play has no limits."
- Website: playstation.com

PlayStation (Note: Japanese: プレイステーション, Hepburn: Pureisutēshon; officially abbreviated as PS) is a video gaming brand owned and produced by Sony Interactive Entertainment (SIE), a subsidiary of Japanese conglomerate Sony. The brand is recognized primarily for its series of home video game consoles, though it also includes handheld devices, online services, and other media products.

The brainchild of Sony executive Ken Kutaragi, the brand began with the first PlayStation home console released in Japan in 1994 and worldwide the following year, which became the first console of any type to ship over 100 million units, which made PlayStation a globally recognized brand. Since then there have been numerous newer consoles—the most recent being the PlayStation 5 released in 2020—while there have also been a series of handheld consoles and a number of other electronics such as a media center and a smartphone. The main series of controllers utilized by the PlayStation series is the DualShock, a line of vibration-feedback gamepads. SIE also operate numerous online services like PlayStation Network, the PlayStation Store, and the subscription-based PlayStation Plus, which may also offer non-gaming entertainment services; the PlayStation Network has over 103 million active users monthly as of December 2019.

The series also has a strong line-up of first-party games due to PlayStation Studios, a group of many studios owned by Sony Interactive Entertainment that exclusively developed them for PlayStation consoles. In addition, the series features various budget re-releases of games by Sony with different names for each region; these include the PlayStation Hits, Platinum, Essentials, and The Best selection of games. It is also known for the four iconic PlayStation face buttons and has been known for its numerous marketing campaigns, the latest of which being the "Play Has No Limits" commercials.

== History ==
PlayStation consoles release timeline
| 1994 | Playstation |
1995–1998
| 1999 | PocketStation |
| 2000 | PS One |
| 2000 | Playstation 2 |
2001–2002
| 2003 | PSX |
| 2004 | Playstation 2 Slimline (SCPH-700xx) |
| 2004 | PlayStation Portable (PSP-1000) |
2005
| 2006 | Playstation 3 |
| 2007 | PlayStation Portable (PSP-2000) |
| 2007 | Playstation 2 Slimline (SCPH-9000x) |
| 2008 | PlayStation Portable (PSP-3000) |
| 2009 | Playstation 3 Slim |
| 2009 | PSP Go |
| 2010 | Sony BRAVIA KDL22PX300 (with inbuilt PlayStation 2) |
| 2011 | PSP Street |
| 2011 | PlayStation Vita (PCH-1000) |
| 2012 | Playstation 3 Super Slim |
| 2013 | PlayStation Vita (PCH-2000) |
| 2013 | PlayStation 4 |
| 2013 | PlayStation Vita TV |
2014–2015
| 2016 | PlayStation 4 Slim |
| 2016 | PlayStation 4 Pro |
2017
| 2018 | PlayStation Classic |
2019
| 2020 | PlayStation 5 |
2021–2022
| 2023 | PlayStation 5 Slim |
| 2024 | PlayStation 5 Pro |

=== Origins ===
PlayStation was the brainchild of Ken Kutaragi, a Sony executive who managed one of the company's hardware engineering divisions and was later dubbed "The Father of the PlayStation".

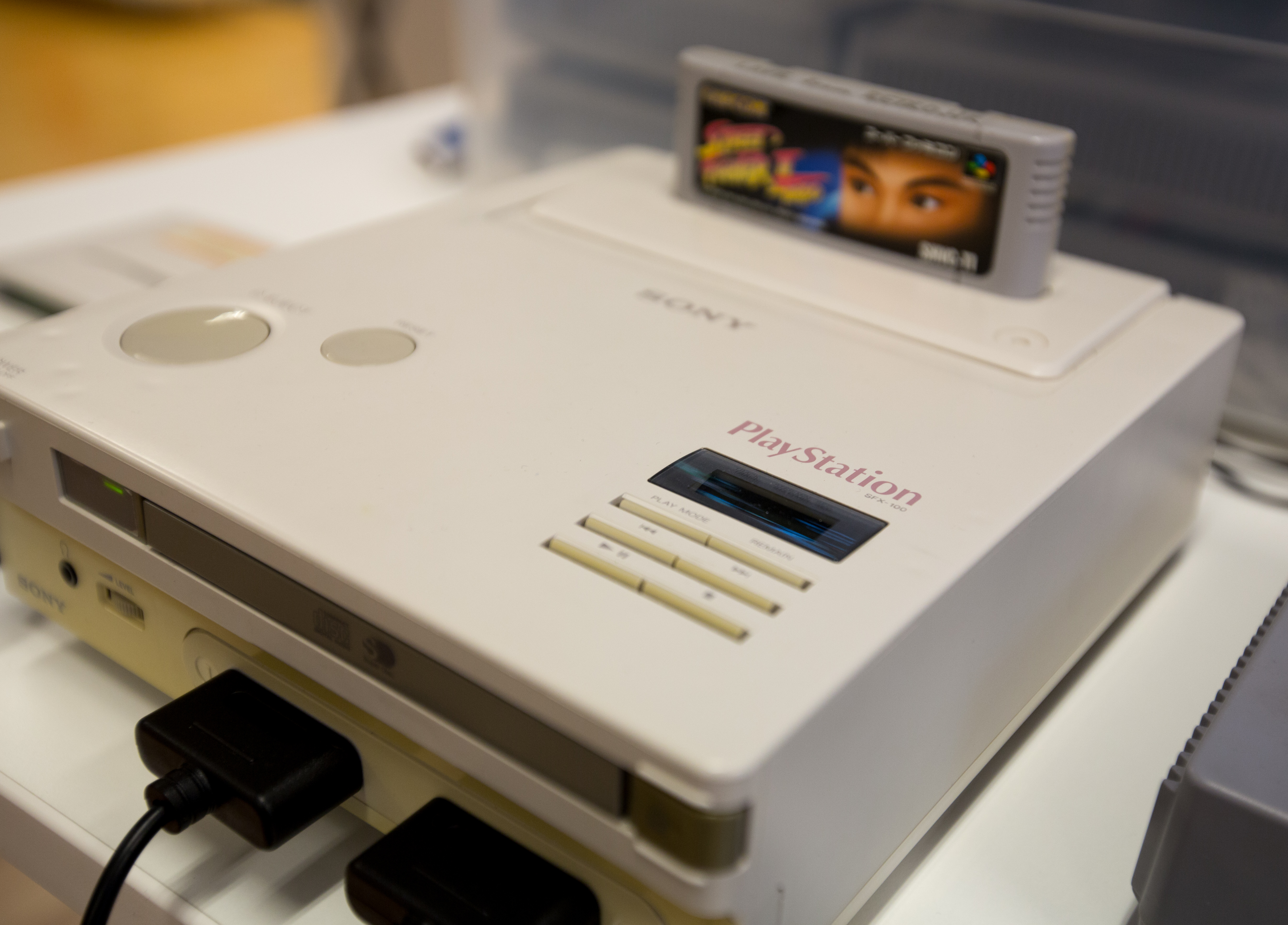
One of two known remaining prototypes of Sony's original "PlayStation", a Super NES with a built-in CD-ROM drive

Until 1991, Sony had little direct involvement with the video game industry. The company supplied components for other consoles, such as the sound chip for the Super Famicom from Nintendo, and operated a video game studio, Sony Imagesoft. As part of a joint project between Nintendo and Sony that began as early as 1988, the two companies worked to create a CD-ROM version of the Super Famicom, though Nintendo denied the existence of the Sony deal as late as March 1991. At the Consumer Electronics Show in June 1991, Sony revealed a Super Famicom with a built-in CD-ROM drive that incorporated Green Book technology or CD-i, called "Play Station" (also known as SNES-CD). However, a day after the announcement at CES, Nintendo announced that it would be breaking its partnership with Sony, opting to go with Philips instead but using the same technology. The deal was broken by Nintendo after they were unable to agree on how revenue would be split between the two companies. The breaking of the partnership infuriated Sony President Norio Ohga, who responded by appointing Kutaragi with the responsibility of developing the PlayStation project to rival Nintendo.

At that time, negotiations were still ongoing between Nintendo and Sony, with Nintendo offering Sony a "non-gaming role" regarding their new partnership with Philips. This proposal was swiftly rejected by Kutaragi who was facing increasing criticism over his work with regard to entering the video game industry from within Sony. Negotiations officially ended in May 1992 and in order to decide the fate of the PlayStation project, a meeting was held in June 1992, consisting of Sony President Ohga, PlayStation Head Kutaragi and several senior members of Sony's board. At the meeting, Kutaragi unveiled a proprietary CD-ROM-based system he had been working on which involved playing video games with 3D graphics to the board. Eventually, Sony President Ohga decided to retain the project after being reminded by Kutaragi of the humiliation he suffered from Nintendo. Nevertheless, due to strong opposition from a majority present at the meeting as well as widespread internal opposition to the project by the older generation of Sony executives, Kutaragi and his team had to be shifted from Sony's headquarters to Sony Music, a completely separate financial entity owned by Sony, so as to retain the project and maintain relationships with Philips for the MMCD development project (which helped lead to the creation of the DVD).

Original PlayStation logo introduced in 1994 (left); this version had been primarily marketed until the introduction of a monochrome variant in 2009 (right)

According to SCE's producer Ryoji Akagawa and chairman Shigeo Maruyama, there was uncertainty over whether the console should primarily focus on 2D sprite graphics or 3D polygon graphics. Eventually, after witnessing the success of Sega's Virtua Fighter in Japanese arcades, Sony realized "the direction of the PlayStation became instantly clear" and 3D polygon graphics became the console's primary focus.

The PlayStation logo was designed by Manabu Sakamoto. He wanted the logo to capture the 3D support of the console, but instead of just adding apparent depth to the letters "P" and "S", he created an optical illusion that suggested the letters in depth of space. Sakamoto also stuck with four bright principal colors, red, yellow, green, and blue, only having to tune the green color for better harmony across the logo. Sakamoto also designed the black-and-white logo based on the same design, reserved for times where colors could not be used.

=== Formation of Sony Computer Entertainment ===
Sony Computer Entertainment logo (1993–2016)

At Sony Music Entertainment, Kutaragi worked closely with Shigeo Maruyama, the CEO of Sony Music, and with Akira Sato to form Sony Computer Entertainment Inc. (SCEI) on November 16, 1993. A building block of SCEI was its initial partnership with Sony Music which helped SCEI attract creative talent to the company as well as assist SCEI in manufacturing, marketing and producing discs, something that Sony Music had been doing with Music Discs. The final two key members of SCEI were Terry Tokunaka, the president of SCEI from Sony's headquarters, and Olaf Olafsson. Olafsson was CEO and president of New York-based Sony Interactive Entertainment which was the parent company for the 1994-founded Sony Computer Entertainment of America (SCEA).

The PlayStation project, SCEI's first official project, was finally given the green light by Sony executives in 1993 after a few years of development. Also in 1993, Phil Harrison, who later became President of SCE Worldwide Studios, was recruited into SCEI to attract developers and publishers to produce games for their new PlayStation platform.

In March 1994, Computer Gaming World reported a rumor that the "Sony PS-X" would be released in Japan "before the end of this year and will retail for less than $400". After a demonstration of Sony's distribution plan as well as tech demos of its new console to game publishers and developers in a hotel in Tokyo in 1994, numerous developers began to approach PlayStation. Two of whom later became major partners were Electronic Arts in the West and Namco in Japan. One of the factors that attracted developers to the platform was the use of a 3D-capable, CD-ROM-based console that was much cheaper and easier to manufacture compared to Nintendo's rival console, which used cartridge systems. The project eventually hit Japanese stores in December 1994 and gained massive sales due to its lower price point than its competitor, the Sega Saturn. The popularity of the console spread after its release worldwide in North America and Europe.

== Home consoles ==
=== PlayStation ===
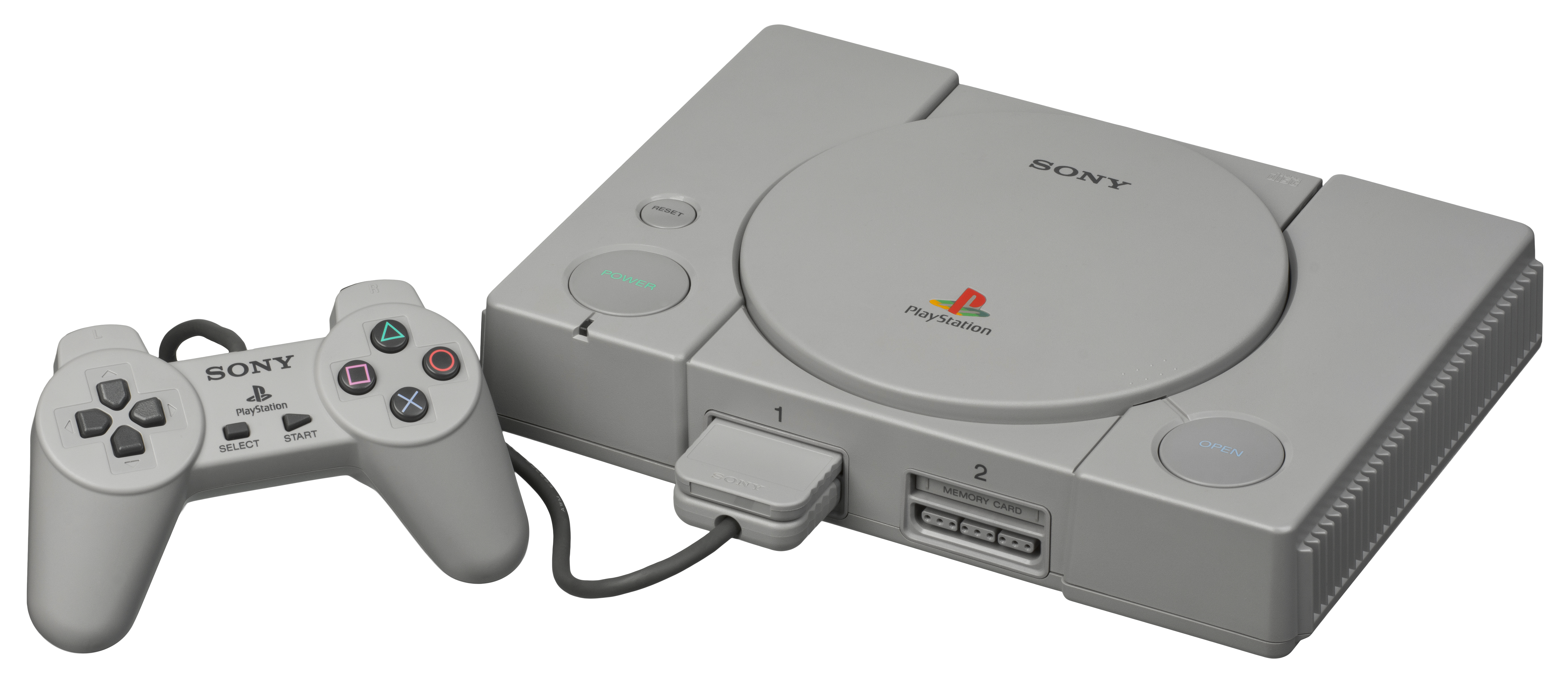
Original PlayStation with the original controller

The original PlayStation, released in Japan on December 3, 1994, was the first of the PlayStation series of console and hand-held game devices. It has included successor consoles and upgrades including the Net Yaroze (a special black PlayStation with tools and instructions to program PlayStation games and applications), "PS one" (a smaller version of the original) and the PocketStation (a handheld which enhances PlayStation games and also acts as a memory card). It was part of the fifth generation of video game consoles competing against the Sega Saturn and the Nintendo 64. By December 2003, the PlayStation and PS one had shipped a combined total of 102.49 million units, eventually becoming the first video game console to sell 120 million units.

==== PS One ====
Released on July 7, 2000, concurrently with its successor the PlayStation 2, the PS One (stylized as PS one) was a considerably smaller, redesigned version of the original PlayStation video game console. The PS one went on to outsell all other consoles, including its successor, throughout the remainder of the year. It featured two main changes from its predecessor, the first being a cosmetic change to the console and the second being the home menu's graphical user interface (GUI); a variation of the GUI previously used only on PAL consoles up to that point.

=== PlayStation 2 ===
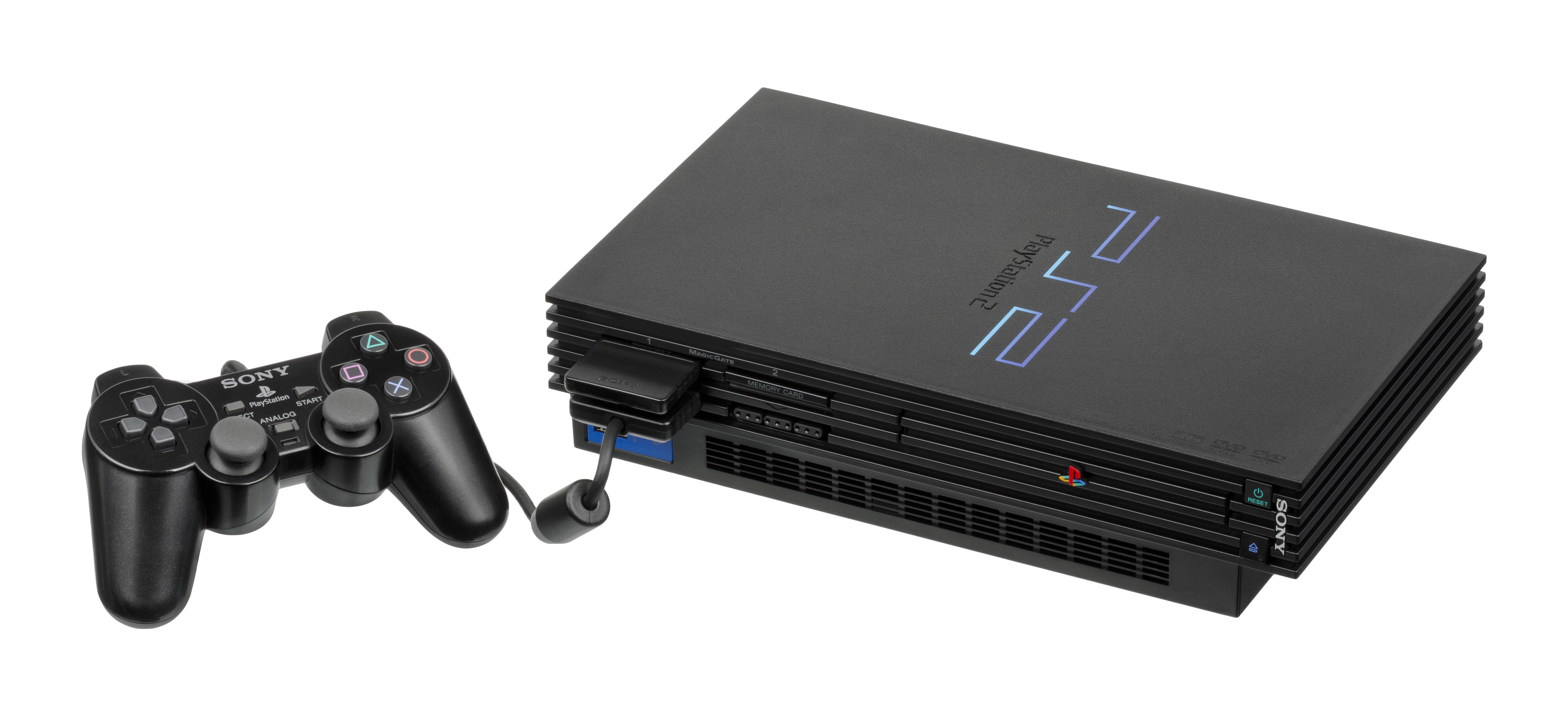
Original PlayStation 2 with a DVD disc drive and a DualShock 2 controller

Released in 2000, 15 months after the Dreamcast and a year before its other competitors, the Xbox and the GameCube, the PlayStation 2 is part of the sixth generation of video game consoles, and is backwards-compatible with most original PlayStation games. Like its predecessor, it has received a slimmer redesign. It is the most successful console in the world, having sold over 155 million units as of December 28, 2012. On November 29, 2005, the PS2 became the fastest game console to reach 100 million units shipped, accomplishing the feat within 5 years and 9 months from its launch. This achievement occurred faster than its predecessor, the PlayStation, which took "9 years and 6 months since launch" to reach the same figure. PlayStation 2 shipments in Japan ended on December 28, 2012. The Guardian reported on January 4, 2013, that PS2 production had ended worldwide, but studies showed that many people all around the world still own one even if it is no longer in use. PlayStation 2 has been ranked as the best-selling console of all time as of 2015.

==== Slimline model ====
Released in 2004, four years after the launch of the original PlayStation 2, the PlayStation 2 Slimline was the first major redesign of the PlayStation 2. Compared to its predecessor, the Slimline was smaller, thinner, quieter and also included a built-in Ethernet port (in some markets it also has an integrated modem). In 2007, Sony began shipping a revision of the Slimline which was lighter than the original Slimline together with a lighter AC adapter. In 2008, Sony released yet another revision of the Slimline which had an overhauled internal design incorporating the power supply into the console itself like the original PlayStation 2 resulting in a further reduced total weight of the console.

=== PlayStation 3 ===
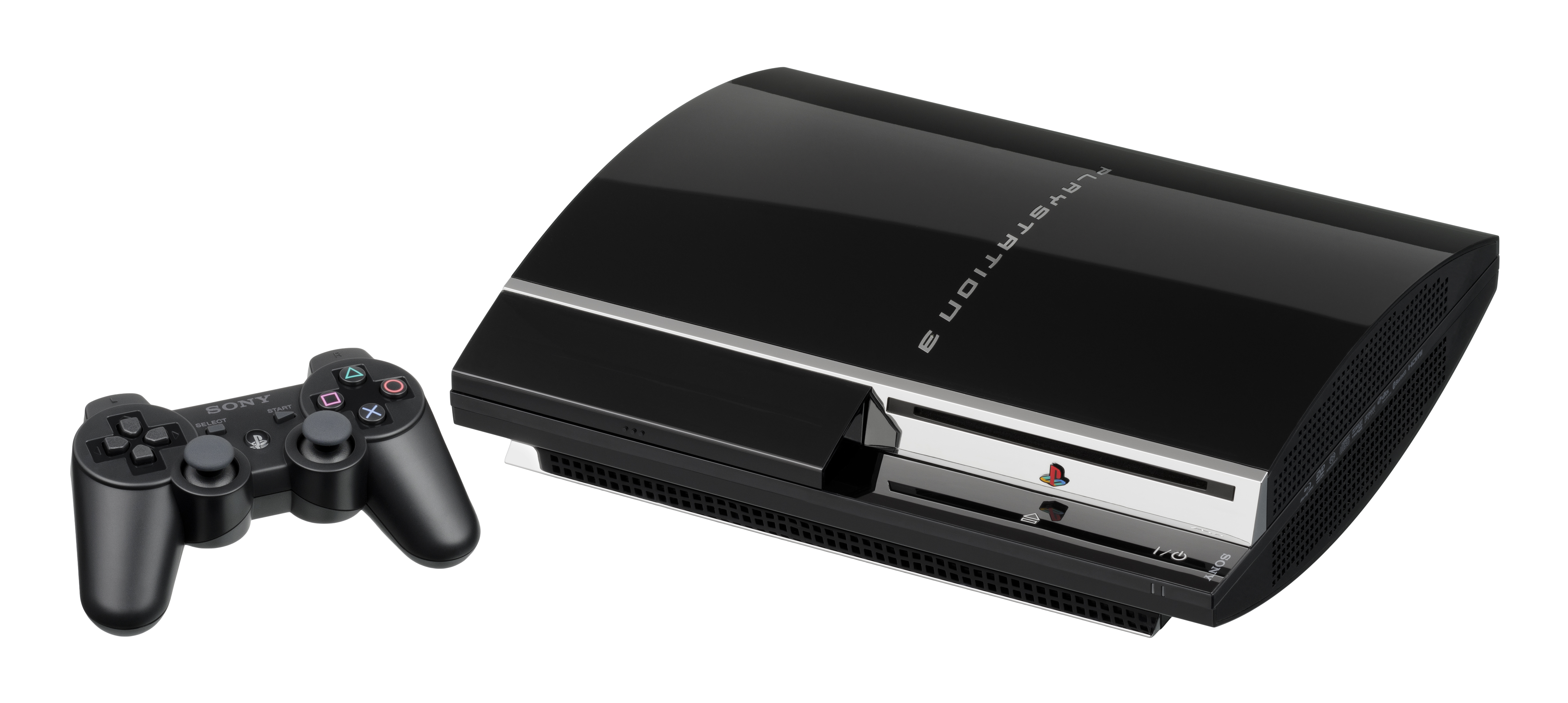
Original PlayStation 3 console with a Blu-ray disc drive and a DualShock 3 controller

Released on November 11, 2006, in Japan, the PlayStation 3 (PS3) is a seventh generation game console from Sony. It competes with the Microsoft Xbox 360 and the Nintendo Wii. The PS3 is the first console in the series to introduce the use of motion-sensing technology through its Sixaxis wireless controller. The console also incorporates a Blu-ray Disc player and features high-definition resolution. The PS3 was originally offered with either a 20 GB or 60 GB hard drive, but over the years its capacity increased in increments available up to 500 GB. The PlayStation 3 has sold over 80 million consoles worldwide as of November 2013.

==== Slim model ====
Like its predecessors, the PlayStation 3 was re-released in 2009 as a "slim" model. The redesigned model is 33% smaller, 36% lighter, and consumes 34% to 45% less power than previous models. In addition, it features a redesigned cooling system and a smaller Cell processor which was moved to a 45nm manufacturing process. It sold in excess of a million units within its first 3 weeks on sale. The redesign added support for CEC (branded as BRAVIA Sync, VIERA Link, and others), allowing console control via a TV remote. The PS3 slim also runs quieter and is cooler than previous models due to its 45 nm Cell. The PS3 Slim no longer has the "main power" switch (similar to PlayStation 2 slim), like the previous PS3 models, which was located at the back of the console. It was officially released on September 1, 2009, in North America and Europe and on September 3, 2009, in Japan, Australia and New Zealand.

==== Super Slim model ====
In 2012, Sony revealed a new "Super Slim" PlayStation 3. The new console, with a completely redesigned case that has a sliding door covering the disc drive (which has been moved to the top of the console), is 4.3 pounds, almost three pounds lighter than the previous "slim" model. The console comes with either 12 GB flash memory or a 250 GB, 500 GB hard drive. Several bundles which include a Super Slim PS3 and a selection of games are available.

=== PlayStation 4 ===
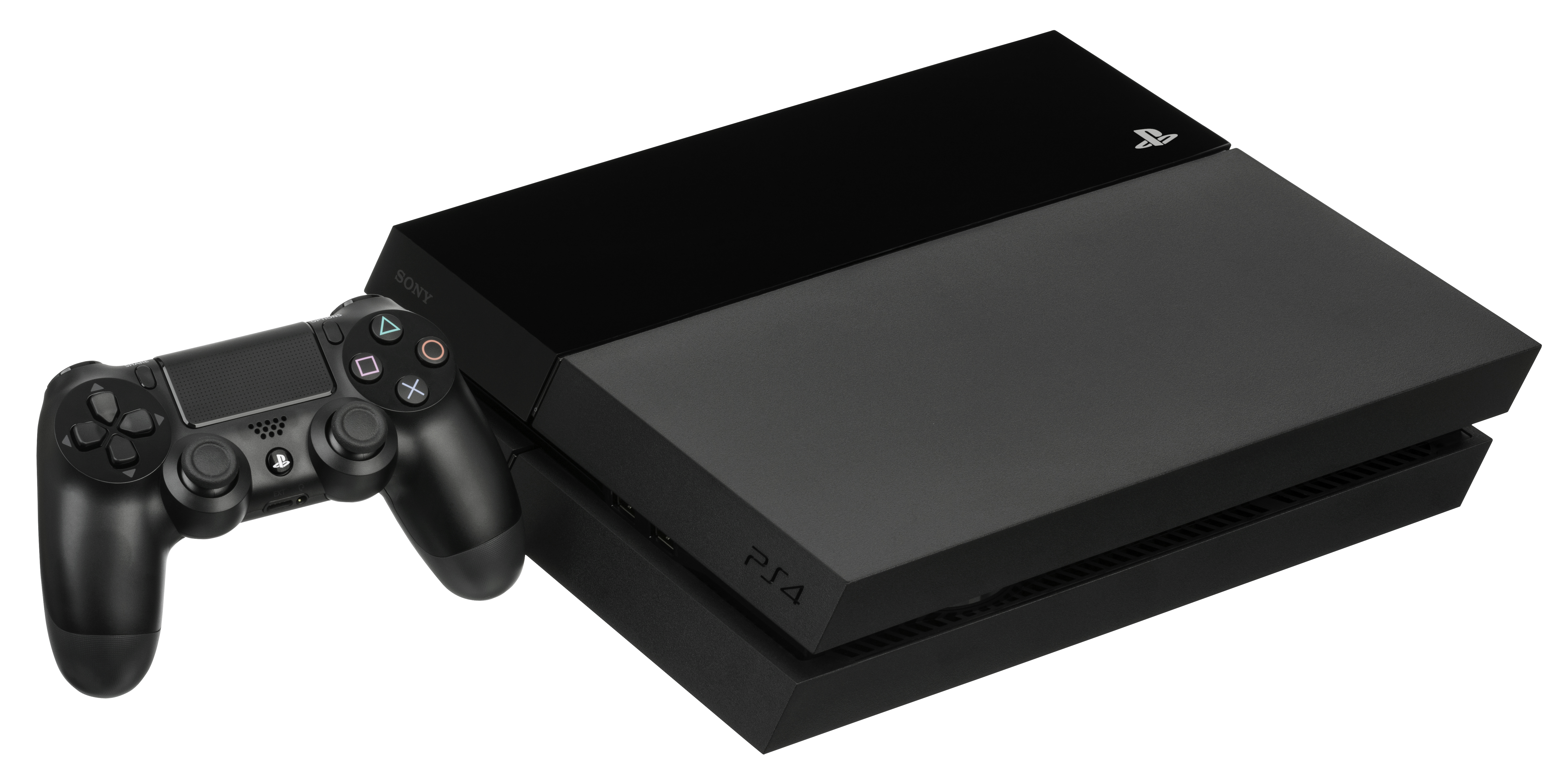
Original PlayStation 4 with a Blu-ray disc drive and a DualShock 4 controller

The PlayStation 4 (PS4) was announced by Sony Computer Entertainment at a press conference on February 20, 2013. In the meeting, Sony revealed some hardware specifications of the new console. It introduced the x86 architecture to the PlayStation series. According to lead system architect Mark Cerny, development on the PlayStation 4 began as early as 2008. PlayStation Europe CEO Jim Ryan emphasized in 2011 that Sony wanted to avoid launching the next-generation console behind the competition.

Among the new applications and services, Sony introduced the PlayStation App, allowing PS4 owners to turn smartphones and tablets into a second screen to enhance gameplay. The company also planned to debut PlayStation Now game streaming service, powered by technology from Gaikai. By incorporating a share button on the new controller and making it possible to view in-game content being streamed live from friends, Sony planned to place more focus on social gameplay as well. The PlayStation 4 was first released in North America on November 15, 2013. As part of the eighth generation of video game consoles, it competes with Microsoft's Xbox One and Nintendo's Wii U and Switch.

==== Slim model ====
PlayStation 4 Slim (officially marketed simply as PlayStation 4 or PS4) was unveiled on September 7, 2016. It is a revision of the original PS4 hardware with a streamlined form factor. The new casing is 40% smaller and carries a rounded body with a matte finish on the top of the console rather than a two-tone finish. The two USB ports on the front have a larger gap between them, and the optical audio port was also removed.^{[168]} It ships with a minor update to the DualShock 4 controller, with the light bar visible through the top of the touchpad and a dark matte grey coloured exterior instead of a partially shiny black. The PS4 Slim was released on September 15, 2016, with a 500 GB model at the same price point as the original PS4 model.^{[169]} Its model number is CUH-2000.^{[170]}

==== Pro model ====
PlayStation 4 Pro or PS4 Pro for short (originally announced under the codename Neo)^{[35]} was unveiled on September 7, 2016. Its model number is CUH-7000.^{[170]} It is an updated version of the PlayStation 4 with improved hardware, including an upgraded GPU with 4.2 teraflops of processing power, and a higher CPU clock. It is designed primarily to enable selected games to be playable at 4K resolution, and improved quality for PlayStation VR. All games are backwards and forward compatible between PS4 and PS4 Pro, but games with optimizations will have improved graphics performance on PS4 Pro. Although capable of streaming 4K video from online sources, PS4 Pro does not support Ultra HD Blu-ray.^{[171] [172] [173]} Additionally the PS4 Pro is the only PS4 model which can remote play at 1080p. The other models are limited to 720p.^{[174]}

=== PlayStation 5 ===
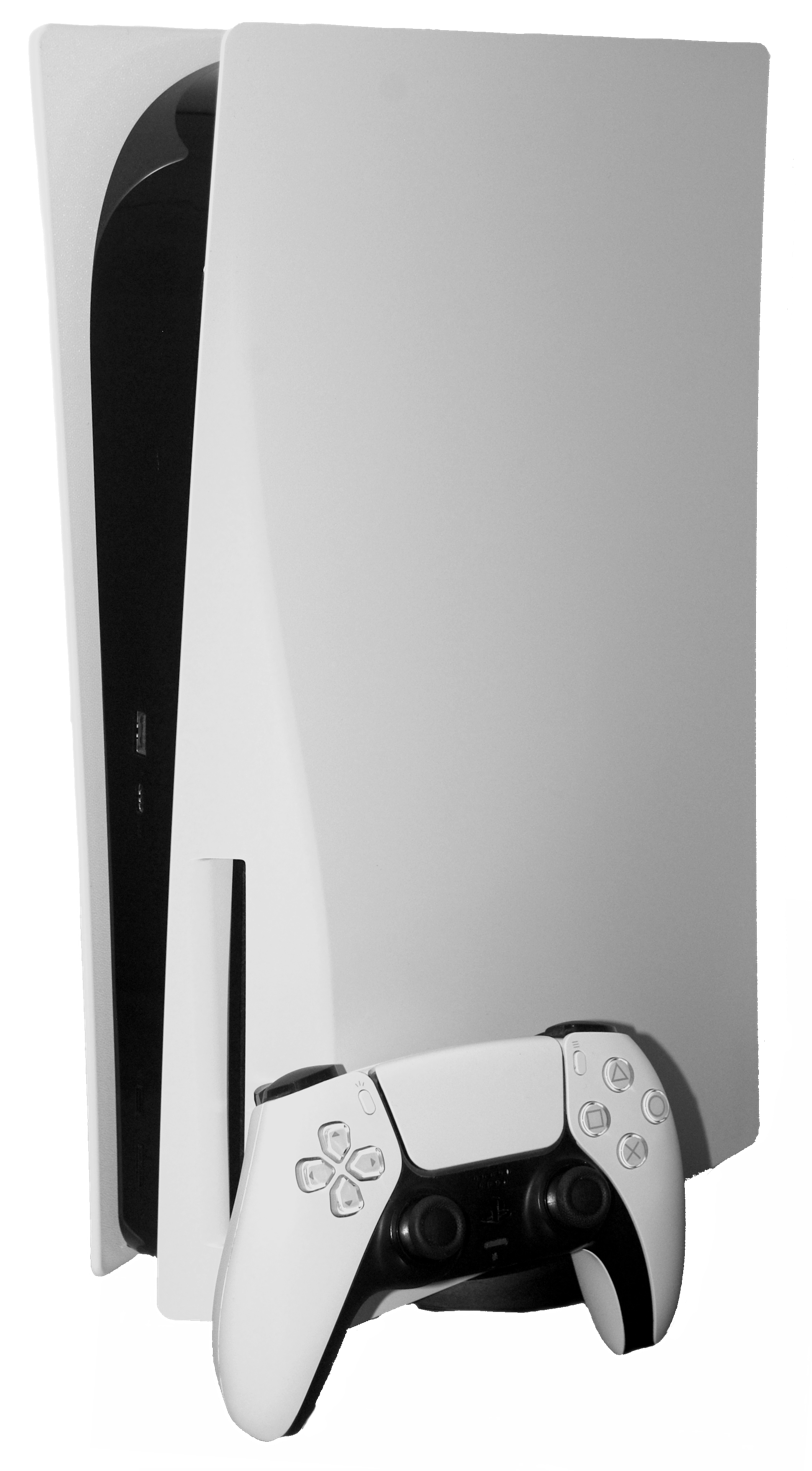
Original PlayStation 5 with a 4K Blu-ray disc drive and a DualSense controller

The PlayStation 5 (PS5) was released worldwide on November 12, 2020, and, alongside the Xbox Series X and Series S, released the same month, is part of the ninth generation of video game consoles. The first news of the PS5 came from Mark Cerny in an interview with Wired in April 2019. Sony intended for the PlayStation 5 to be its next-generation console and planned to ship it worldwide by the end of 2020. In early 2019, Sony's financial report for the quarter ending March 31, 2019, affirmed that new next-generation hardware was in development but would ship no earlier than April 2020.

The current specifications were released in October 2019. The console uses an 8-core, 16-thread CPU based on AMD's Zen 2 microarchitecture, manufactured on the 7 nanometer process node. The graphics processor is a custom variant of AMD's Navi family using the RDNA microarchitecture, which includes support for hardware acceleration of ray-tracing rendering, enabling real-time ray-traced graphics. The new console ships with a custom SSD storage, as Cerny emphasized the need for fast loading times and higher bandwidth to make games more immersive, as well as to support the required content streaming from disc for 8K resolution. In a second interview with Wired in October 2019, further details of the new hardware were revealed: the console's integrated Blu-ray drive would support 100 GB Blu-ray discs and Ultra HD Blu-ray; while a game installation from a disc is mandatory as to take advantage of the SSD, the user will have some fine-grain control of how much they want to have installed, such as only installing multiplayer components of a game. Sony is developing an improved suspended gameplay state for the PlayStation 5 to consume less energy than the PlayStation 4.

The system's new controller, the DualSense has adaptive triggers that can change the resistance to the player as necessary, such as changing the resistance during the action of pulling an arrow back in a bow in-game. The controller also has strong haptic feedback through voice coil actuators, which together with an improved controller speaker is intended to give better in-game feedback. USB-C connectivity, together with a higher-rated battery are other improvements to the new controller.

The PlayStation 5 features a completely revamped user interface. The PlayStation 5 is backwards-compatible with most PlayStation 4 and PlayStation VR games, with Cerny stating that the transition to the new console is meant to be a soft one. In a later interview, Jim Ryan talked of the PlayStation 5 being able to play "99%" of PlayStation 4 games, an estimate derived from a sample size of "thousands".

==== Slim model ====
A revised slimmer design for the PS5, similar to past "slim" rereleases, was released in October 2023. Besides the slimmer design, the slim model features 1 TB of internal storage and replaces one of the USB-A ports with USB-C. The base version also removes the internal optical disc drive, replaced by an external drive.

==== Pro model ====
The PlayStation 5 Pro was released in November 2024. It features three main upgrades over the base PS5 model: a GPU that was about 45% faster than the base PS5 GPU, the inclusion of an image upscaling technology called PlayStation Spectral Super Resolution (PSSR), and an increase of internal storage to 2 TB. Games are able to take advantage of the improved graphical performance if programmed for it, with about 50 games ready to use this feature at launch.

=== Comparison ===
| Console | PlayStation (PS) | PlayStation 2 (PS2) | PlayStation 3 (PS3) | PlayStation 4 (PS4) | PlayStation 5 (PS5) |
|---|---|---|---|---|---|
| Image | Top: PS Bottom: PS One | Top: PS2 Middle: PS2 Slimline (2004) Bottom: PS2 Slimline (2007) | Top: PS3 Middle: PS3 Slim Bottom: PS3 Super Slim | Top: PS4 Middle: PS4 Slim Bottom: PS4 Pro | Top: PS5 Bottom: PS5 Digital Edition |
| Launch price | PS ¥39,800; US$299 £299 PS One ¥15,000; US$99 £79 | PS2 ¥39,800; US$299 £299 PS2 Slimline (2004); US$149 €149 £99 PS2 Slimline (2007) ¥16,000; US$99 | PS3 ¥49,980 (20 GB); US$499 (20 GB) US$599 (60 GB) £425 (60 GB) €599 (60 GB) PS3 Slim ¥29,980 (120 GB); US$299 (120 GB) €299 (120 GB) PS3 Super Slim ¥24,980 (250 GB); US$269 (250 GB) €299 (500 GB) | PS4 ¥38,980 (500 GB); US$399 (500 GB) €399 (500 GB) £349 (500 GB) PS4 Slim; US$299 (500 GB); US$349 (1 TB) €299 (500 GB) €349 (1 TB) PS4 Pro ¥44,980 (1 TB); US$399 (1 TB) €399 (1 TB) £349 (1 TB) | PS5 ¥49,980 (825 GB); US$499,99 (825 GB) €499,99 (825 GB) £449,99 (825 GB) PS5 Digital Edition ¥39,980 (825 GB); US$399,99 (825 GB) €399,99 (825 GB) £359,99 (825 GB) PS5 Slim (detachable disc drive included) ¥66,980 (1 TB); US$499,99 (1 TB) €550 (1 TB) £480 (1 TB) PS5 Slim Digital Edition (without disc drive in package) ¥58,980 (1 TB); US$449,99 (1 TB) €450 (1 TB) £390 (1 TB) PS5 Pro (without disc drive in package) ¥119,980 (2 TB); US$699,99 (2 TB) €799,99 (2 TB) £699,99 (2 TB) |
| Release date | PS: JP: December 3, 1994; NA: September 9, 1995; EU: September 29, 1995; AU: November 15, 1995; PS One: EU: 2000; JP: July 7, 2000; NA: September 19, 2000 | PS2: JP: March 4, 2000; NA: October 26, 2000; EU: November 24, 2000; AU: November 30, 2000; PS2 Slimline (2004): EU: October 29, 2004; JP: November 3, 2004; NA: November 2004; PS2 Slimline (2007): JP: November 22, 2007; EU: 2008; NA: 2008 | PS3: JP: November 11, 2006; NA: November 17, 2006; EU: March 23, 2007; AU: March 23, 2007; PS3 Slim: JP: August 27, 2009; NA: September 1, 2009; EU: September 1, 2009; PS3 Super Slim: NA: September 25, 2012; EU: September 28, 2012; JP: October 4, 2012 | PS4: NA: November 15, 2013; EU: November 29, 2013; AU: November 29, 2013; JP: February 22, 2014; PS4 Slim: JP: September 15, 2016; NA: September 15, 2016; EU: September 15, 2016; PS4 Pro: JP: November 10, 2016; NA: November 10, 2016; EU: November 10, 2016 | PS5; PS5 Digital Edition: JP: November 12, 2020; NA: November 12, 2020; EU: November 12, 2020; AU: November 19, 2020; PS5 Slim; PS5 Slim Digital Edition: JP: November 10, 2023; NA: November 10, 2023; EU: November 29, 2023; PS5 Pro: JP: November 7, 2024; NA: November 7, 2024; EU: November 7, 2024 |
| Units shipped | 102.49 million incl. 28.15 million PS one (as of March 31, 2007) | 155 million (as of December 28, 2012) | 87.4 million (as of March 31, 2017) | 117.2 million (as of March 31, 2022) | 92.2 million (as of January 31, 2026) |
| Best-selling game | Gran Turismo; 10.85 million shipped (as of April 30, 2008) | Grand Theft Auto: San Andreas; 17.33 million shipped (as of March 26, 2008) | Grand Theft Auto V; over 15 million shipped (as of December 7, 2013) | Marvel's Spider-Man; over 20 million shipped (as of November 18, 2020) | Marvel's Spider-Man 2; over 11 million shipped (as of April 20, 2024) |
| Media | CD-ROM | DVD-ROM/CD-ROM | BD-ROM, DVD-ROM, CD-ROM, SACD (1st and 2nd Gen Only) | Blu-ray, DVD; Blu-ray 6x CAV, DVD 8x CAV | PS5: Ultra HD Blu-ray, Blu-ray, DVD PS5 Digital Edition: Digital Content Only PS5 Slim: Ultra HD Blu-ray, Blu-ray, DVD via detachable disc drive PS5 Pro: Ultra HD Blu-ray, Blu-ray, DVD via detachable disc drive |
| Included accessories and extras | RFU Adapter; Controller (PlayStation Controller or DualShock, depending on production date) | DualShock 2 Controller; Composite AV cable | Internal hard drive (20, 40, 60, 80, 120, 160, 250, 320 or 500 GB, depending on model); Wireless DualShock 3 / Sixaxis Controller; Composite AV cable; Ethernet cable; USB cable | Internal hard drive (500 GB/1 TB) (PS4 and PS4 Slim), Internal hard drive (1 TB) (PS4 Pro); Wireless DualShock 4 Controller; Mono Headset; Power Cable; HDMI Cable; USB Cable | Internal solid-state drive (825 GB, 1 or 2 TB, depending on model); Wireless DualSense controller; Base; Power Cable; HDMI Cable; USB Cable |
| Accessories (retail) | PlayStation Controller; Dual Analog Controller; DualShock; Multitap (up to 4 players); Fishing reel controllers (Bass Landing and Reel Fishing); GunCon; Jogcon; Konami Justifier; BeatMania controller; NeGcon; PocketStation; Flightstick; Memory Card; S-Video cable; Euro-AV Cable (RGB-SCART) | DualShock 2; PlayStation 2 HDD Internal hard drive supported by PlayStation 2 Expansion Bay (model 30000 and 50000 only); PlayStation 2 Headset; EyeToy; Driving Force Steering Wheels with Force Feedback; Onimusha 3 katana controller; Resident Evil 4 chainsaw controller; PlayStation 2 DVD remote control; Network adapter Built-in for slim case model (PSTwo, model 70000); Memory Card (8 MB, 16 MB, 32 MB, 64 MB, 128 MB) (for PlayStation 2); Guitar Hero SG Controller; 'Buzz' Controllers (with all versions of Buzz); Light gun (GunCon 2); Multitap (multi-controller adaptor); Component AV cable; S-Video cable; Euro-AV Cable (RGB-SCART); Microphones (with Karaoke Revolution and SingStar games); USB Mouse & Keyboard | PlayStation Move; PlayStation Eye; DualShock 3 Wireless Controller; Blu-ray Remote Control; S-Video cable; Component AV cable; D-Terminal AV cable; HDMI cable; PlayTV; torne; Various rhythm game controllers for Guitar Hero, DJ Hero, Band Hero, Rock Band and Singstar games; Microphones; Guitar and Bass Guitar controllers; Drum controllers; Turntable controllers (DJ Hero/DJ Hero 2); Keyboard controller (Rock Band 3); Light Gun (GunCon 3) | DualShock 4 Wireless controller; DualShock 4 charging station; PlayStation Camera; PlayStation VR; Console covers | Input Devices: DualSense Wireless controller; DualSense Edge Wireless Controller; DualSense Charging Station; Access Controller; FlexStrike Wireless Fight Stick; Audio: Pulse 3D Wireless Headset; Pulse Elite Wireless Headset; Pulse Explore Wireless Earbuds; Pulse Elevate Wireless Speakers; Camera & Media: HD camera; Media Remote; Remote Play & VR: PlayStation Portal; PlayStation VR2; PlayStation VR2 PC Adapter; PlayStation VR2 Sense Controller Charging Station; System & Customization: Disc Drive; Vertical Stand; Console covers; PlayStation Link USB Adapter |
| CPU | R3000A 32bit RISC chip @ 33.7 MHz – Manufactured by LSI Corporation | 300 MHz MIPS "Emotion Engine" | Cell Broadband Engine (3.2 GHz Power ISA 2.03-based PPE with eight 3.2 GHz SPE) | PS4 and PS4 Slim: 8-Core 1.6 GHz AMD "Jaguar" PS4 Pro: 8-Core 2.1 GHz AMD "Enhanced Jaguar" | All models: 8-Core variable frequency (3.5 GHz capped) AMD "Zen 2" |
| GPU | 16.47 million colors Resolution: 256×224 – 640×480 Sprite/BG drawing Adjustable frame buffer No line restriction Unlimited CLUTs (Color Look-Up Tables) 4,000 8×8 pixel sprites with individual scaling and rotation Simultaneous backgrounds (Parallax scrolling) 620,000 polygons/sec | 147 MHz "Graphics Synthesizer"; fill rate 2.352 gigapixel/sec; 1.1 gigapixel w. 1 texture(diffuse); 588-megapixel/sec w. 2 textures (2 diffuse maps or 1 diffuse map and 1 other(0 around 74 mill, 1 around 40 mill, 2 around 20 mill); 2 textures per pass Capable of multi-pass rendering; Connected to VU1 on CPU (a vector only for visual style coding things with 3.2 GFLOPS) to deliver enhanced shader graphics and other enhanced graphics | 550 MHz RSX "Reality Synthesizer" (based on Nvidia G70 architecture) 192 - 251.2 GFLOPS | PS4 and PS4 Slim: Custom AMD Radeon 18 out of 20 Compute Units enabled (1152 out of 1280 shaders enabled) @ 800 MHz 1.84 TFLOPS PS4 Pro: Custom AMD Radeon, 36 out of 40 Compute Units enabled (2304 out of 2560 shaders enabled) @ 911 MHz 4.19 TFLOPS | PS5 and PS5 Slim: Custom AMD RDNA 2, 36 out of 40 Compute Units enabled (2304 out of 2560 shaders enabled), variable frequency (2.23 GHz capped), up to 10.28 TFLOPS PS5 Pro: Custom AMD RDNA 2.x (hybrid RDNA 3/4 features), 60 out of 64 Compute Units enabled (3840 out of 4096 shaders enabled), variable frequency (2.17 GHz – 2.35 GHz boost), up to 16.7 TFLOPS (FP32) / 33.5 TFLOPS (dual-issue) |
| Online service | —N/a | Non-unified service | PlayStation Network; PlayStation Store; Internet browser A/V chat via PlayStation Eye or PS2 EyeToy, voice chat via headset | PlayStation Network; PlayStation Store; Internet browser | |
| Backward compatibility | —N/a | PlayStation | 20 GB and 60 GB: All PlayStation and PlayStation 2 titles Original 80 GB: All PS1 titles, most PS2 titles. All other models (model code CECHGxx and later): Support for PS1 titles only. | No native backwards compatibility. Cloud based backwards compatibility via PlayStation Now. Emulated PlayStation 2 titles available from the PlayStation Store. | Most PlayStation 4 and PlayStation VR games |
| System software | Proprietary OS | Proprietary OS, Linux; DVD Playback Kit | XrossMediaBar (XMB) | Orbis OS | Orbis OS (partial, otherwise TBA.) |
| System software features | Audio CD playback | Audio CD playback DVD Playback | Operating systems can be installed and run via a hypervisor (feature unavailable with Slim Model); Audio CD playback Audio file playback (ATRAC3, AAC, MP3, WAV, WMA); Video file playback (MPEG1, MPEG2, MPEG4, H.264-AVC, DivX) Blu-ray playback DVD playback Image editing and slideshows (JPEG, GIF, PNG, TIFF, BMP); Mouse and keyboard support Folding@Home client with visualizations from the RSX | Blu-ray playback DVD playback Audio playback from inserted USB flash drive | Blu-ray playback Ultra HD Blu-ray playback DVD playback |
| Consumer programmability | Requires the Net Yaroze kit | Yabasic software, Linux for PlayStation 2 | Development on console via free Linux platform or PC. | —N/a | —N/a |

=== Future consoles ===
Sony has trademarked future PlayStation consoles from 6 through 10, as of 2019.

Cerny said in October 2025 that the next PlayStation console, anticipated to be the PlayStation 6, was in early development and likely to be released in "a few years time". Sony is collaborating with AMD to use its new Radience Cores in the GPU to better support real-time ray tracing and upscaling so as to offload these from other components. However, over 2025 and 2026, RAM and other computer component prices rose significantly as part of the AI boom, among other global factors. It was estimated that the RAM alone for the PlayStation 6 would cost US$680, bringing the potential cost over $1000. In June 2026, Sony said it would not sell hardware at a loss, and was reevaluating its plans for the next PlayStation console release including its release window.

== Handheld consoles ==
=== PocketStation ===
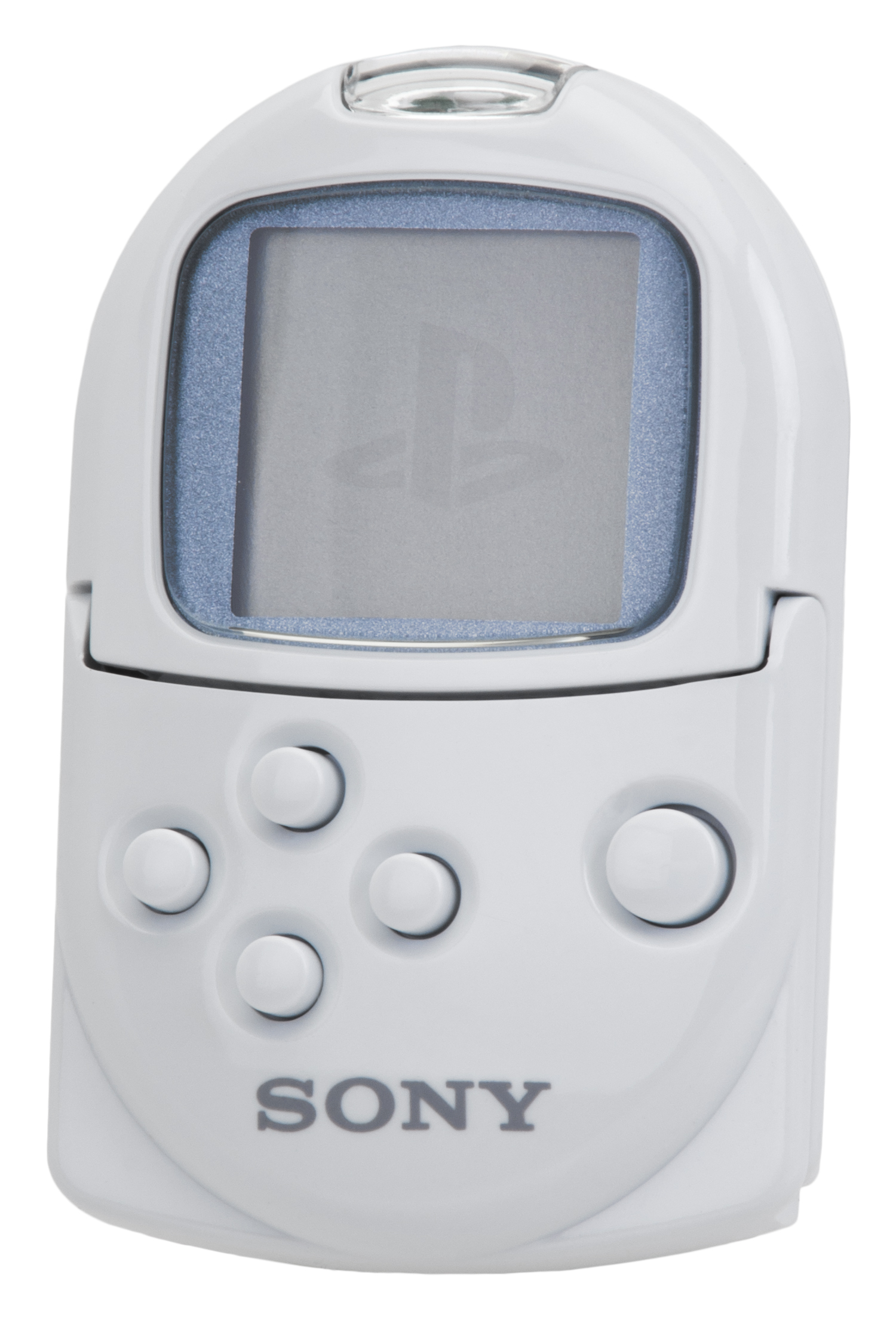
PocketStation

The PocketStation is a Memory Card peripheral by Sony Computer Entertainment for the original PlayStation. Categorized by Sony as a combination of a Memory Card and a miniature personal digital assistant. Released exclusively in Japan on January 23, 1999, it featured a monochrome LCD, a speaker, a real-time clock and infrared communication capability. It could also be used as a standard PlayStation memory card by connecting it to a PlayStation memory card slot. As a handheld device, it allowed users to play minigames downloaded from compatible PlayStation discs on the go. Over 80 PlayStation games featured integration with the peripheral, allowing players to download exclusive minigames, train characters, or unlock special items for titles like Final Fantasy VIII, Street Fighter Alpha 3, and Ridge Racer Type 4. It was extremely popular in Japan and Sony originally had plans to release it in the United States but the plan was ultimately scrapped due to various manufacturing and supply-and-demand problems.

=== PlayStation Portable ===
The PlayStation Portable (PSP) was Sony's first handheld console to compete with Nintendo's DS console. The original model (PSP-1000) was released in December 2004 and March 2005, The console is the first to utilize a new proprietary optical storage medium known as Universal Media Disc (UMD), which can store both games and movies. It contains 32 MB of internal flash memory storage, expandable via Memory Stick PRO Duo cards. It has a similar control layout to the PS3 with its PlayStation logo button and its ('Triangle'), ('Circle/O'), ('Cross/X') and ('Square') buttons in their white-colored forms.

==== PSP-2000 and PSP-3000 models ====
The PSP-2000 (also known as the Slim & Lite in PAL territories) was the first major hardware revision of the PlayStation Portable, released in September 2007. The 2000 series was 33% lighter and 19% slimmer than the original PlayStation Portable. The capacity of the battery was also reduced by ⅓ but the run time remained the same as the previous model due to lower power consumption. Older model batteries will still work and they extend the amount of playing time. The PSP Slim & Lite has a new gloss finish. Its serial port was also modified to accommodate a new video-out feature (while rendering older PSP remote controls incompatible). On a PSP-2000, PSP games will only output to external monitors or TVs in progressive scan mode, so that televisions incapable of supporting progressive scan will not display PSP games; non-game video will output in either progressive or interlaced mode. USB charging was also made possible. Buttons are also reportedly more responsive on the PSP-2000. In 2008, Sony released a second hardware revision called the PSP-3000 which included several features that were not present in the PSP-2000, such as a built-in microphone and upgraded screen, as well as the ability to output PSP games in interlaced mode.

==== PSP Go model ====
Released in October 2009, the PSP Go diverged from the original design of the previous models in multiple facets. Unlike previous PSP models, the PSP Go does not feature a UMD drive but instead has 16 GB of internal flash memory to store games, videos and other media. This can be extended by up to 32 GB with the use of a Memory Stick Micro (M2) flash card. Also unlike previous PSP models, the PSP Go's rechargeable battery is not removable or replaceable by the user. The unit is 43% lighter and 56% smaller than the original PSP-1000, and 16% lighter and 35% smaller than the PSP-3000. It has a 3.8" 480 × 272 LCD (compared to the larger 4.3" 480 × 272 pixel LCD on previous PSP models). The screen slides up to reveal the main controls. The overall shape and sliding mechanism are similar to that of Sony's mylo COM-2 internet device. The PSP Go was produced and sold concurrently with its predecessor the PSP-3000 although it did not replace it. All games on the PSP Go must be purchased and downloaded from the PlayStation Store as the handheld is not compatible with the original PSP's physical media, the Universal Media Disc. The handheld also features connectivity with the PlayStation 3's controllers the Sixaxis and DualShock 3 via Bluetooth connection.

==== PSP Street ====
The PSP Street (also known as the PSP-E1000) is a budget-focused PSP model which, unlike previous PSP models, does not feature Wi-Fi or stereo speakers (replaced by a single mono speaker) and has a matte "charcoal black" finish similar to the slim PlayStation 3. The E1000 was announced at Gamescom 2011 and available across the PAL region for an RRP of €99.99.

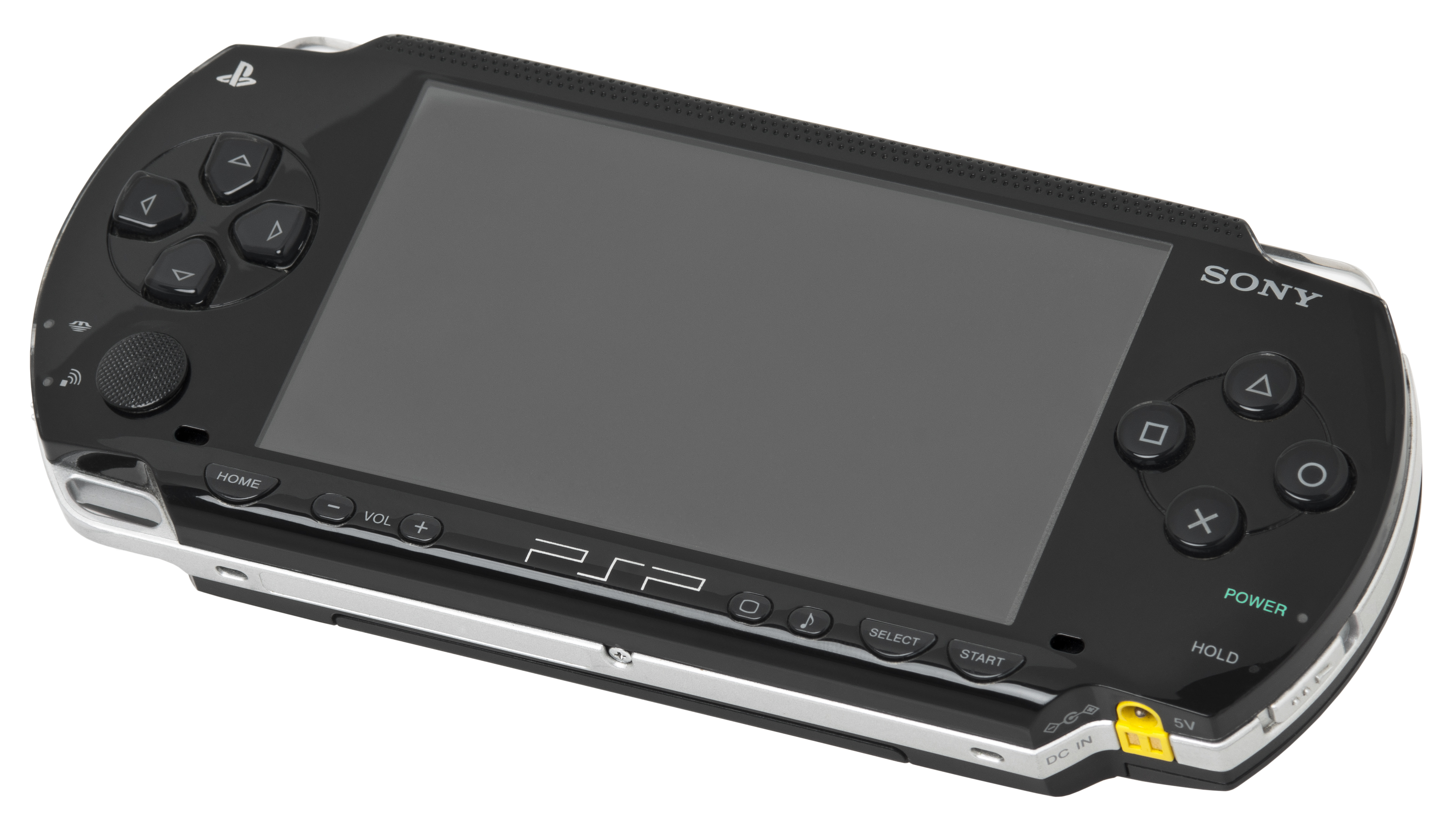
The original PlayStation Portable (PSP-1000)

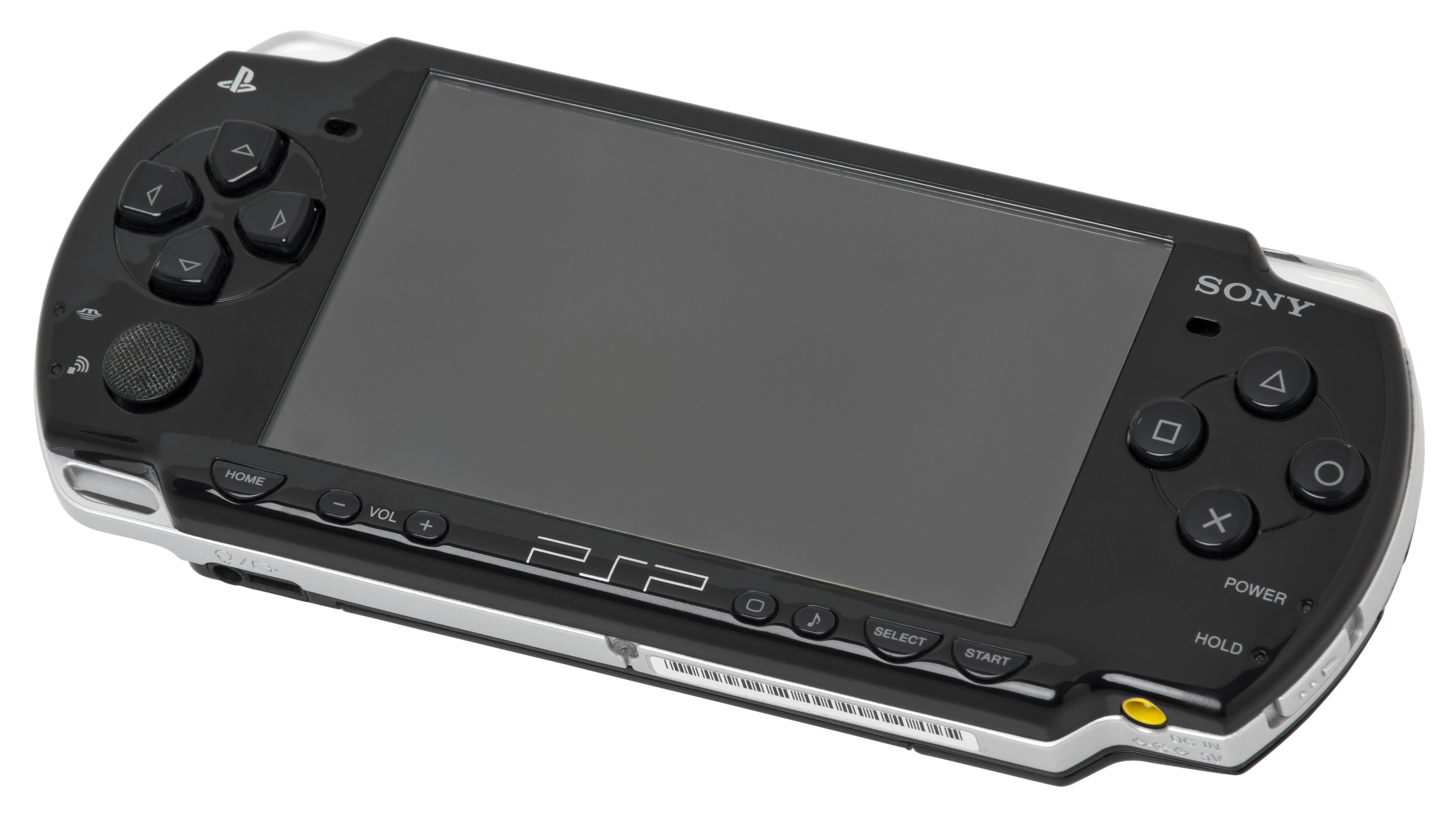
PSP-2000

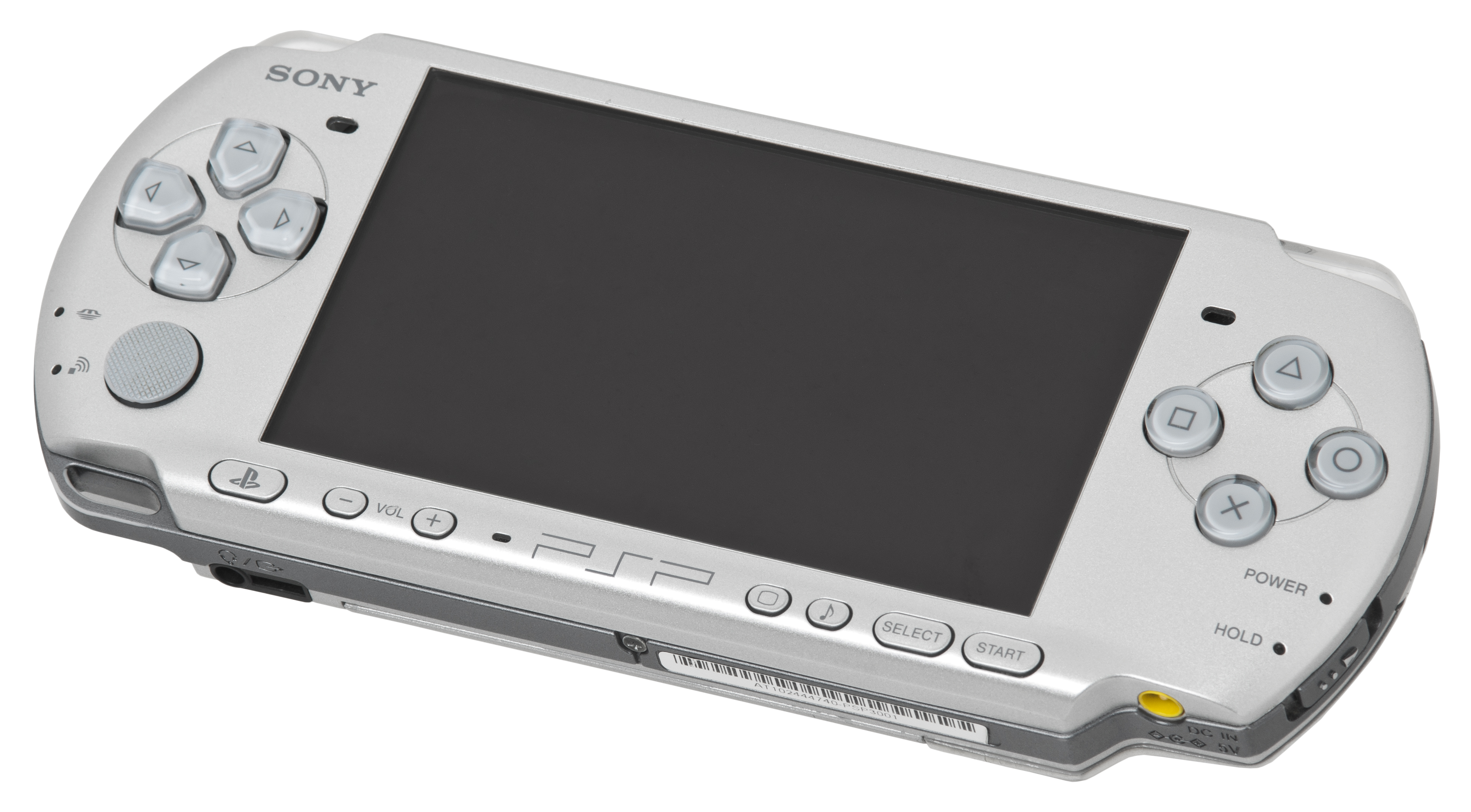
PSP-3000

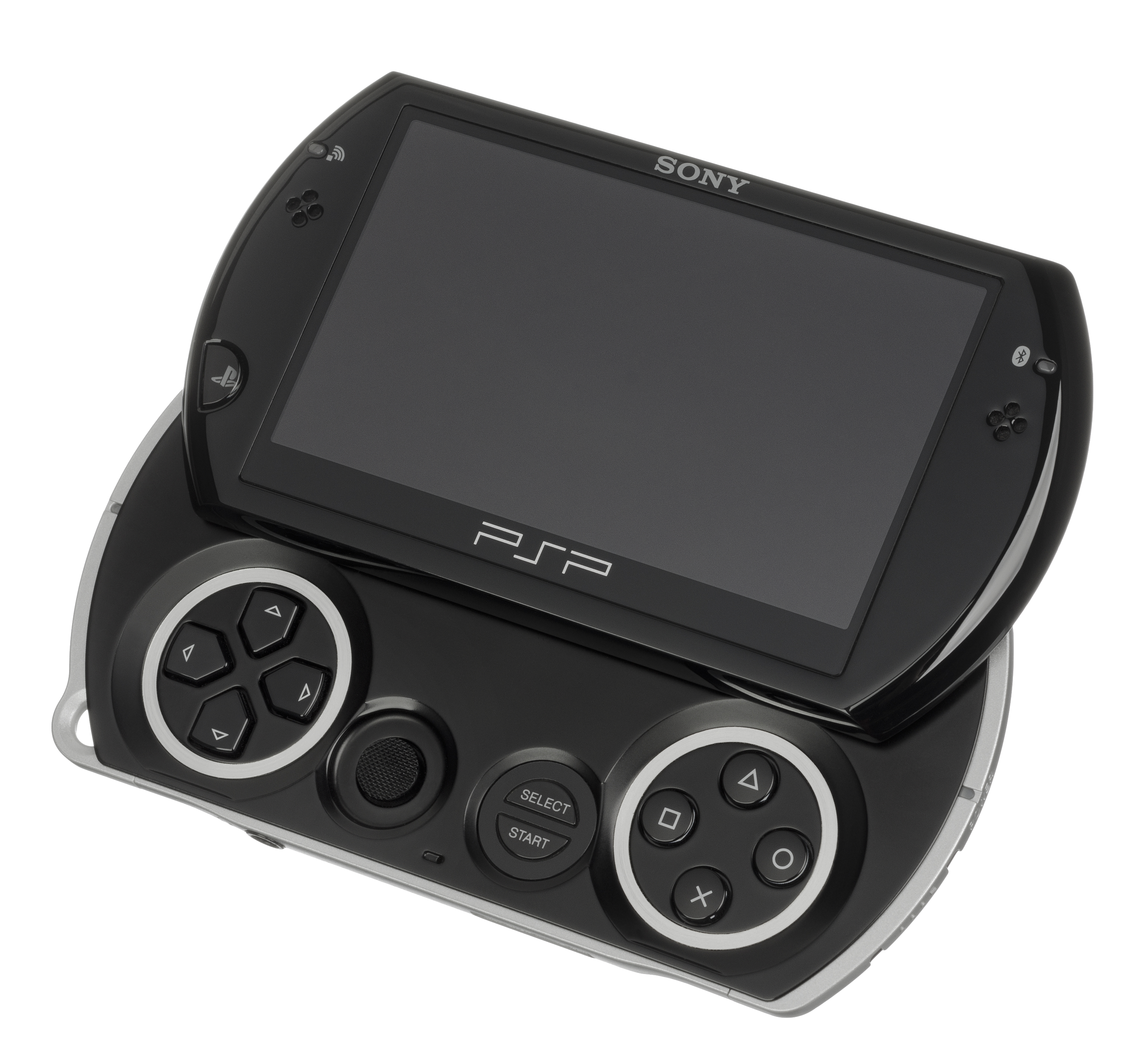
PSP Go
(open position)

PSP Street (PSP-E1000)

=== PlayStation Vita ===
Released in Japan on December 17, 2011, and North America on February 22, 2012, the PlayStation Vita was previously codenamed Next Generation Portable (NGP). It was officially unveiled by Sony on January 27, 2011, at the PlayStation Meeting 2011. The original model of the handheld, the PCH-1000 series features a 5-inch OLED touchscreen, two analog sticks, a rear touchpad, Sixaxis motion sensing and a 4 core ARM Cortex-A9 MPCore processor.

The new PCH-2000 series system is a lighter redesign of the device that was announced at the SCEJA Press Conference in September 2013 prior to the Tokyo Game Show. This model is 20% thinner and 15% lighter compared to the original model, has an additional hour of battery life, an LCD instead of OLED, includes a micro USB Type B port, and 1 GB of internal storage memory. It was released in Japan on October 10, 2013, in six colors: white, black, pink, yellow, blue, and olive green, and in North America on May 6, 2014.

The Vita was discontinued in March 2019. SIE president Jim Ryan said that while the Vita was a great device, they have moved away from portable consoles, "clearly it's a business that we're no longer in now".

==== PlayStation TV ====
PlayStation TV, known in Asia as PlayStation Vita TV or PS Vita TV, is a microconsole and a non-portable variant of the PlayStation Vita handheld. It was announced on September 9, 2013, at a Sony Computer Entertainment Japan presentation. Instead of featuring a display screen, the console connects to a television via HDMI. Users can play using a Sixaxis or a DualShock 3 controller, although due to the difference in features between the controller and the handheld, certain games are not compatible with PS TV, such as those that are dependent on the system's touchscreen, rear touchpad, microphone or camera. The device is said to be compatible with over 100 Vita games, as well as various digital PlayStation Portable, PlayStation and PC Engine titles. The system supports Remote Play compatibility with the PlayStation 4, allowing players to stream games from the PS4 to a separate TV connected to PS TV, and also allows users to stream content from video services such as Hulu and Niconico, as well as access the PlayStation Store. The system was released in Japan on November 14, 2013, in North America on October 14, 2014, and in Europe and Australasia on November 14, 2014.

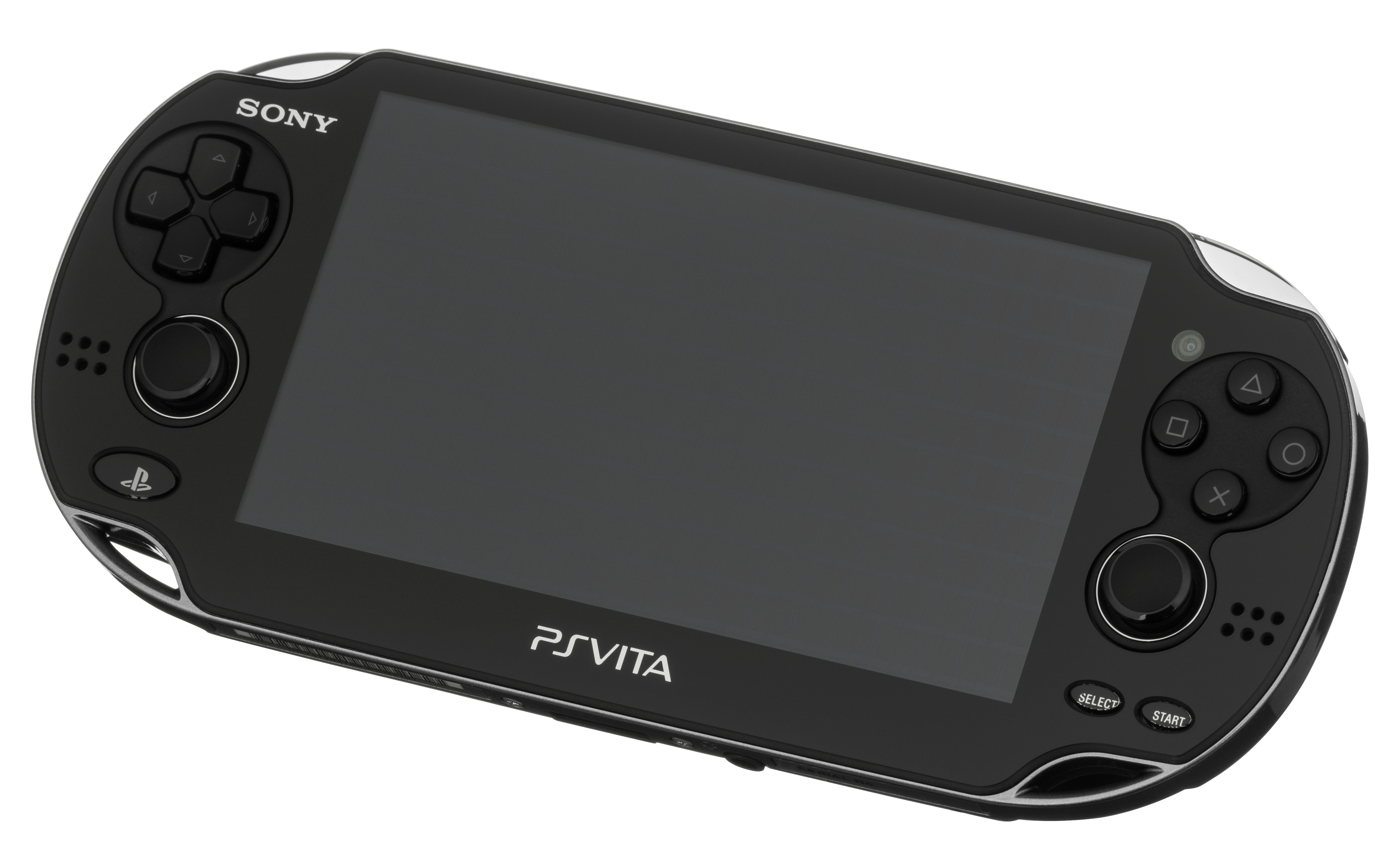
The original PlayStation Vita (PCH-1000)

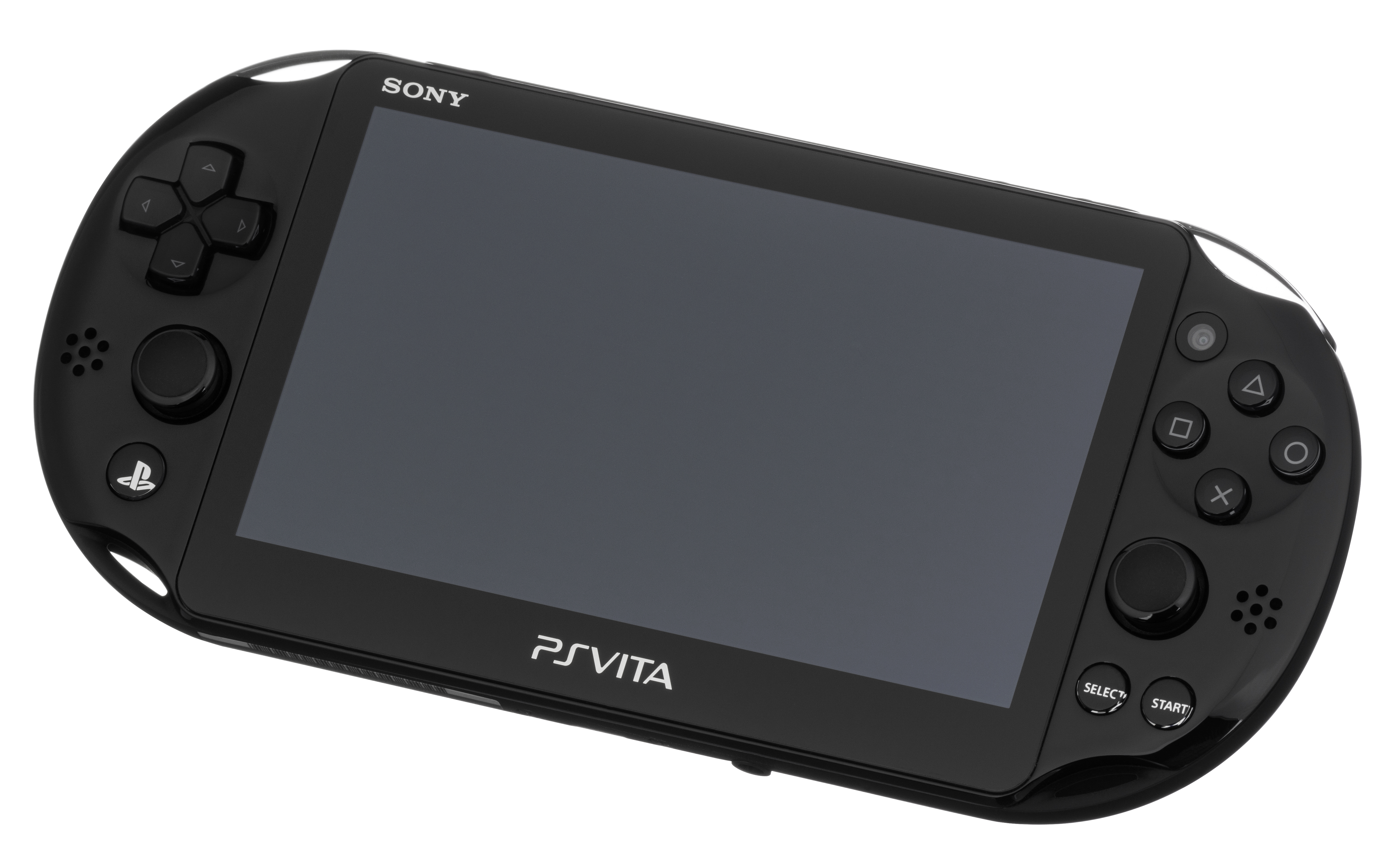
The second generation PS Vita system, PCH-2000

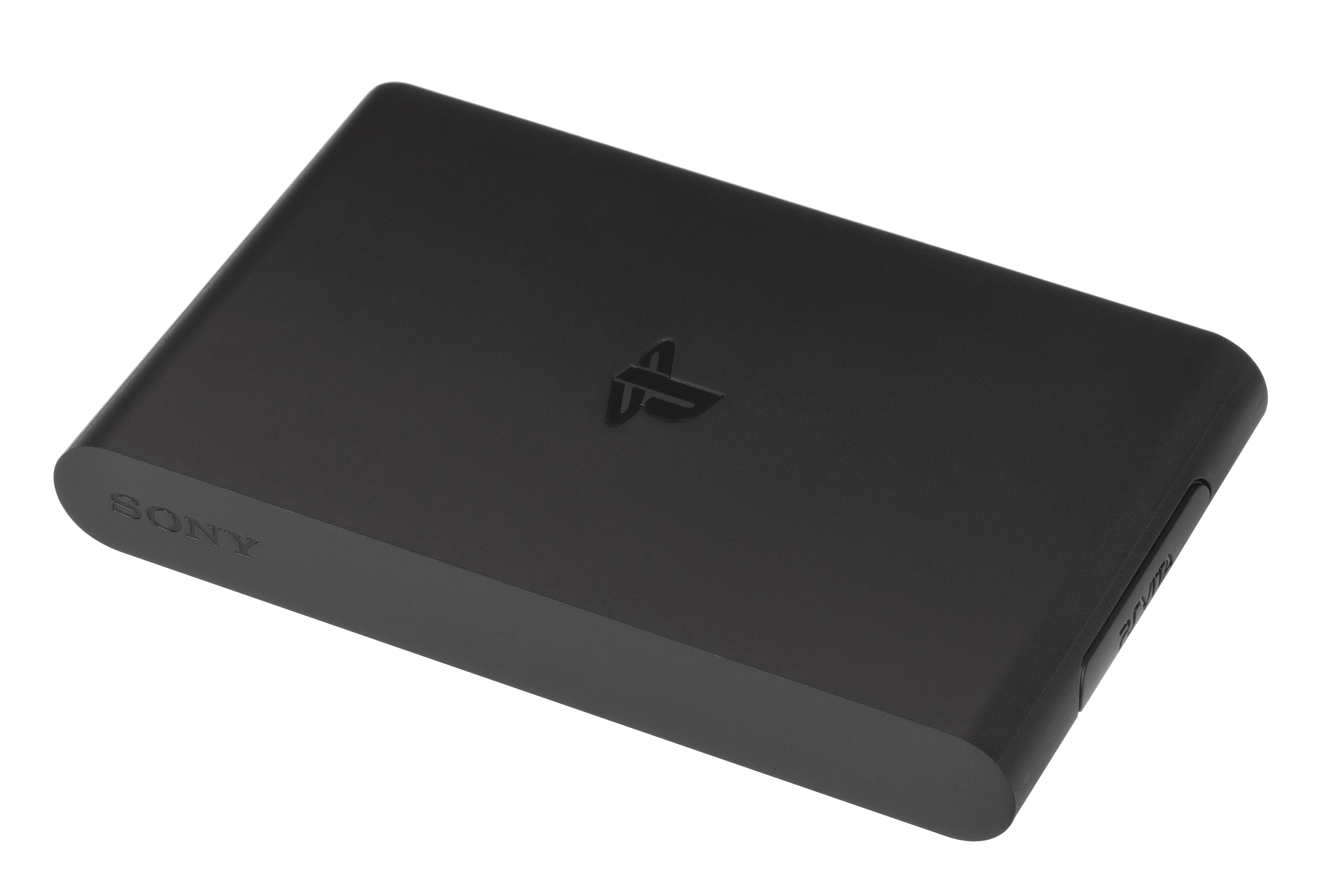
PlayStation Vita TV/PlayStation TV

== Controllers ==
Comparison of PlayStation controllers
| Controller | Buttons | Sticks | D-pad | Triangle Square Circle Cross | L1 R1 | L2 R2 | L3 R3 | Motion | Other |
|---|---|---|---|---|---|---|---|---|---|
| PlayStation controller | Start; Select | —N/a | digital | | | | —N/a | —N/a | — |
| Dual Analog Controller | Start; Select; Analog | 2× analog | digital | | | | digital | —N/a | The Japanese version of the controller (SCPH-1150) includes a vibration feedback feature |
| DualShock | Start; Select; Analog | 2× analog | digital | | | | digital | —N/a | Introduced vibration feedback to all DualShock controllers |
| DualShock 2 | Start; Select; Analog | 2× analog | pressure-sensitive | | | | digital | —N/a | |
| Sixaxis; DualShock 3 | Start; Select; PS | 2× analog | | | | analog | digital | rotation, acceleration (see Sixaxis) | Sixaxis controller lacked vibration capability |
| DualShock 4 | Start; Select; PS | 2× analog | digital | | | analog | digital | rotation, acceleration (see Sixaxis) | 2 point touchpad with click mechanism |
| DualSense | Create; Options; PS | 2× analog | digital | | | analog | digital | rotation, acceleration (see Sixaxis) | 2 point touchpad with click mechanism |
| DualSense | Create; Options; PS | 2× analog | digital | | | analog | digital | rotation, acceleration (see Sixaxis) | Dual-microphone array Mute microphone button |

=== Early PlayStation controllers ===
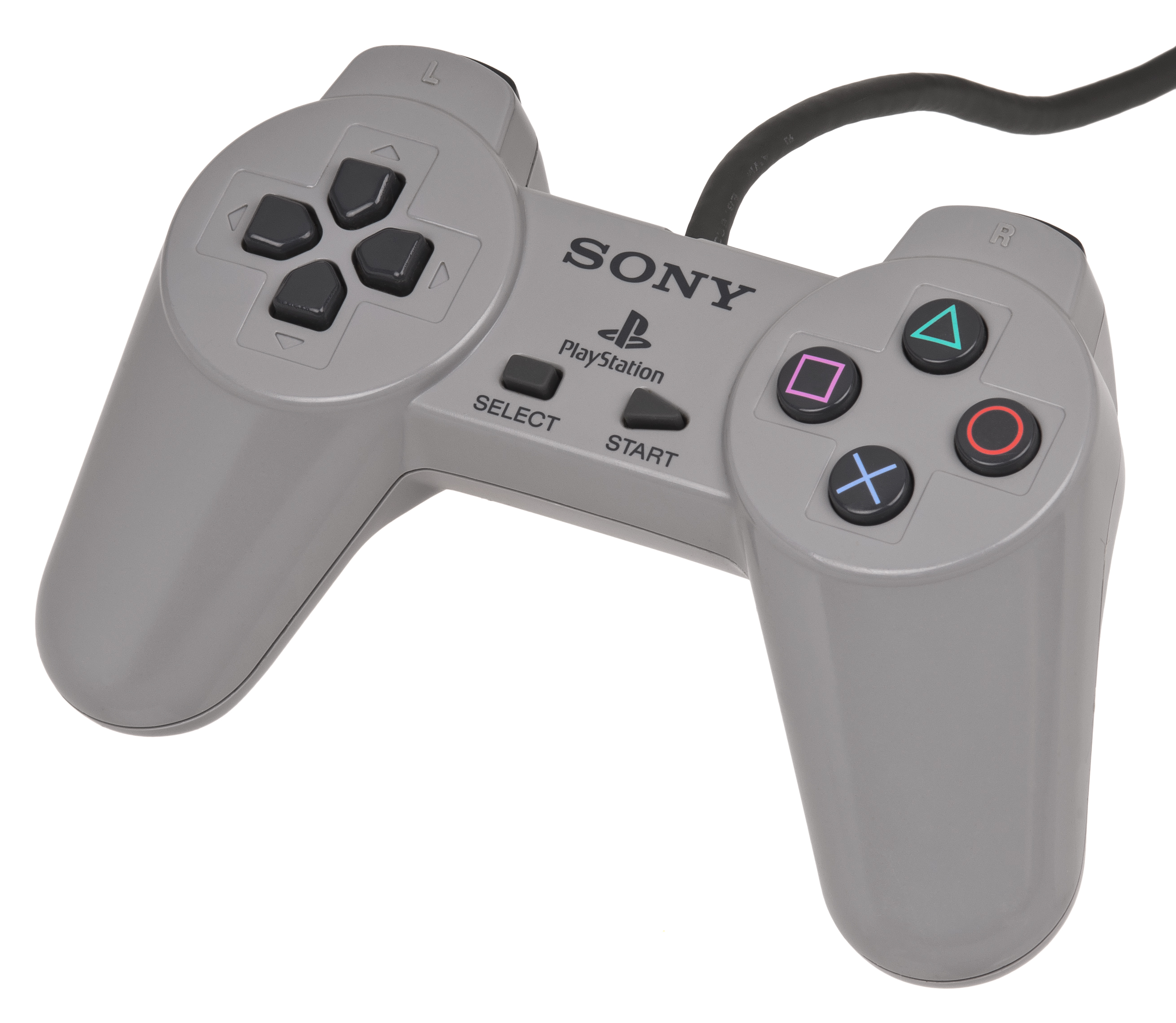
An original PlayStation controller

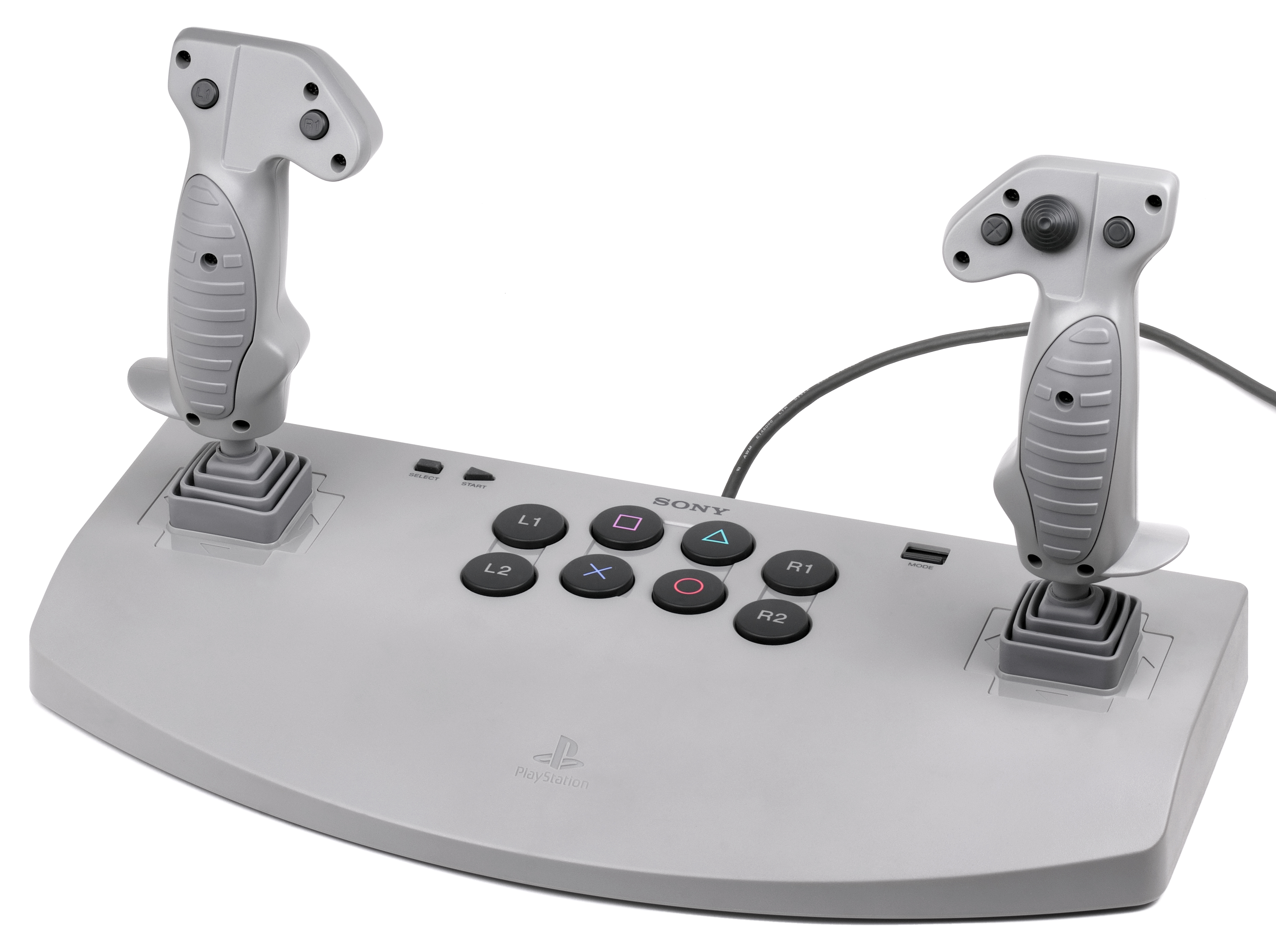
PlayStation Analog Joystick

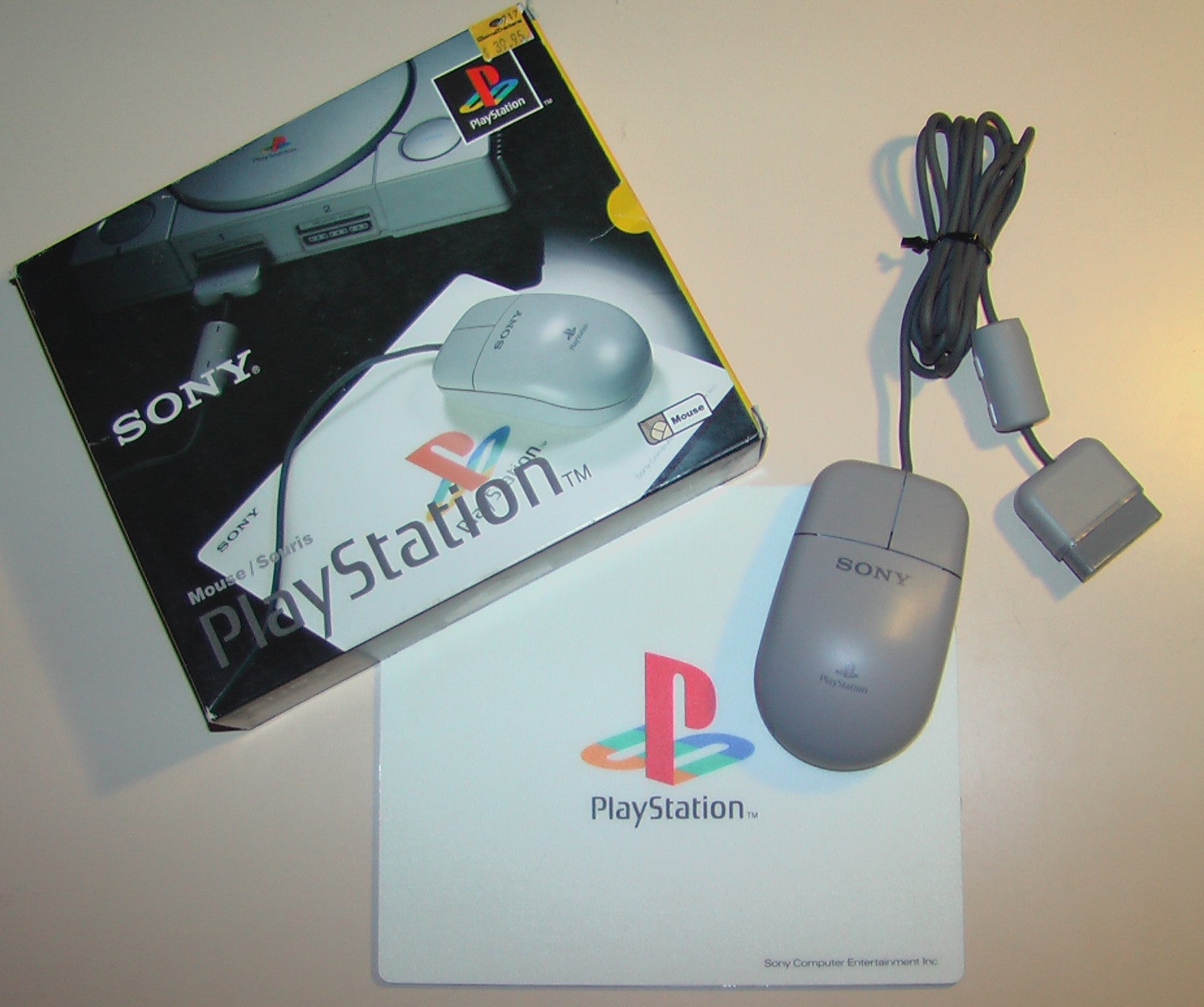
PlayStation Mouse

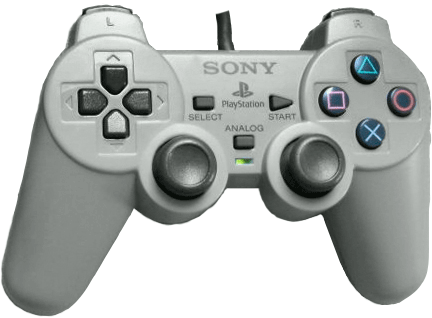
Dual Analog controller

Released in 1994, the PlayStation control pad was the first controller made for the original PlayStation. It featured a basic design of a D-pad, 4 main select buttons ( ('Green Triangle'), ('Red Circle/Red O')), ('Blue Cross/Blue X') and ('Pink Square'), and start and select buttons on the face. 'Shoulder buttons' are also featured on the top [L1, L2, R1, R2] (named by the side [L=Left, R=Right] and 1 and 2 [top and bottom]). In 1996, Sony released the PlayStation Analog Joystick for use with flight simulation games. The original digital controller was then replaced by the Dual Analog in 1997, which added two analog sticks based on the same potentiometer technology as the Analog Joystick. This controller was then also succeeded by the DualShock controller.

=== DualShock, Sixaxis and DualSense ===
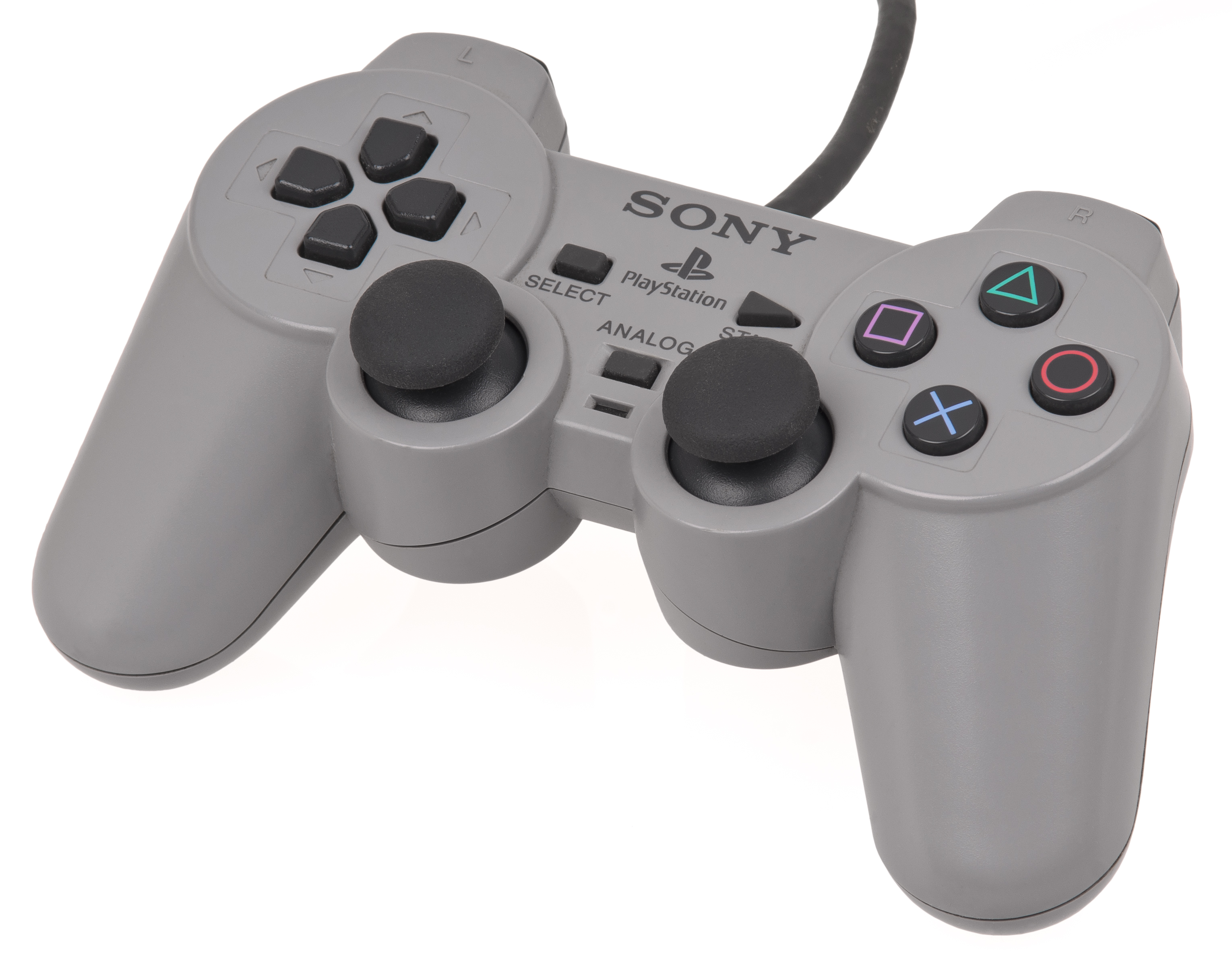
An original DualShock controller

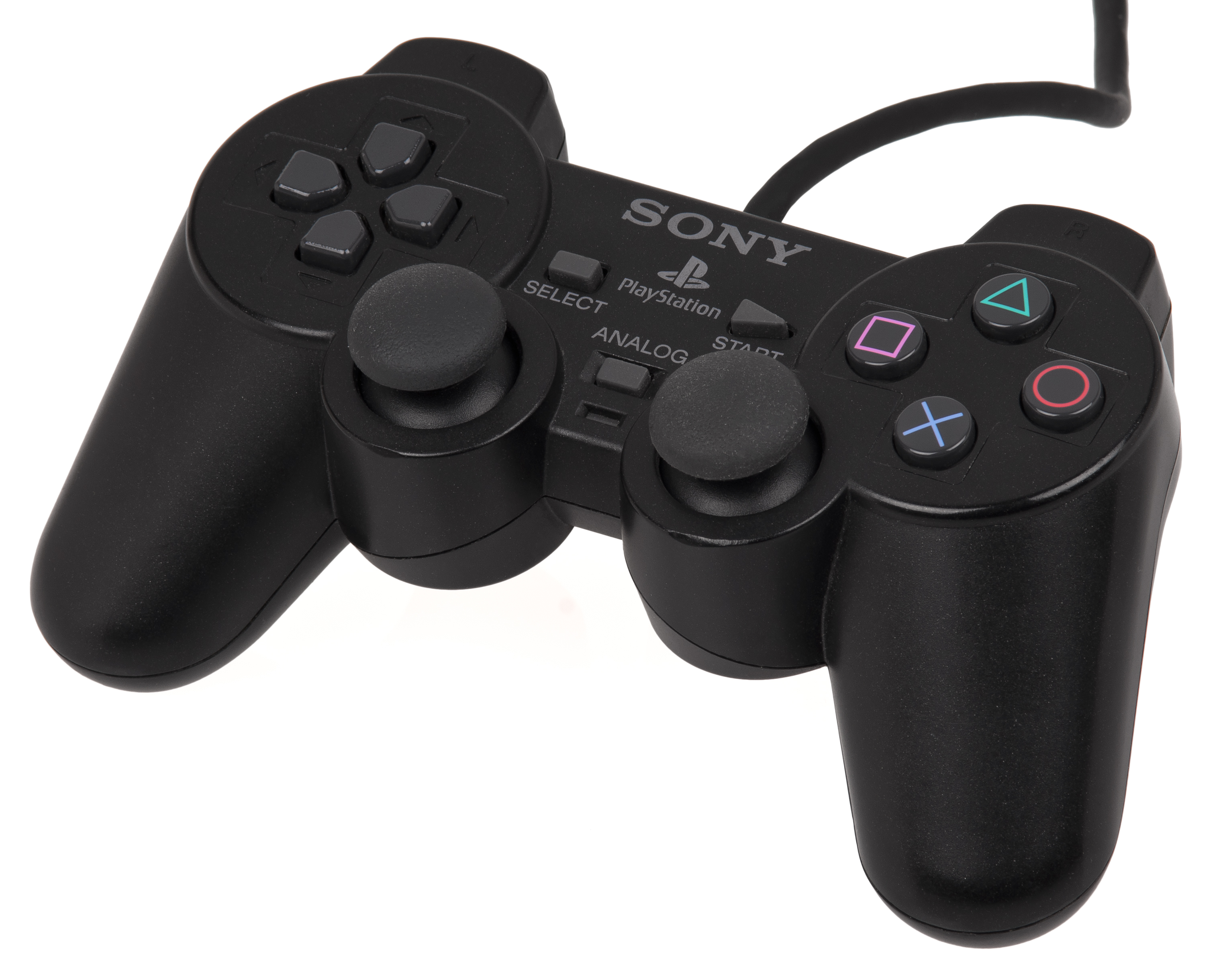
DualShock 2 controller

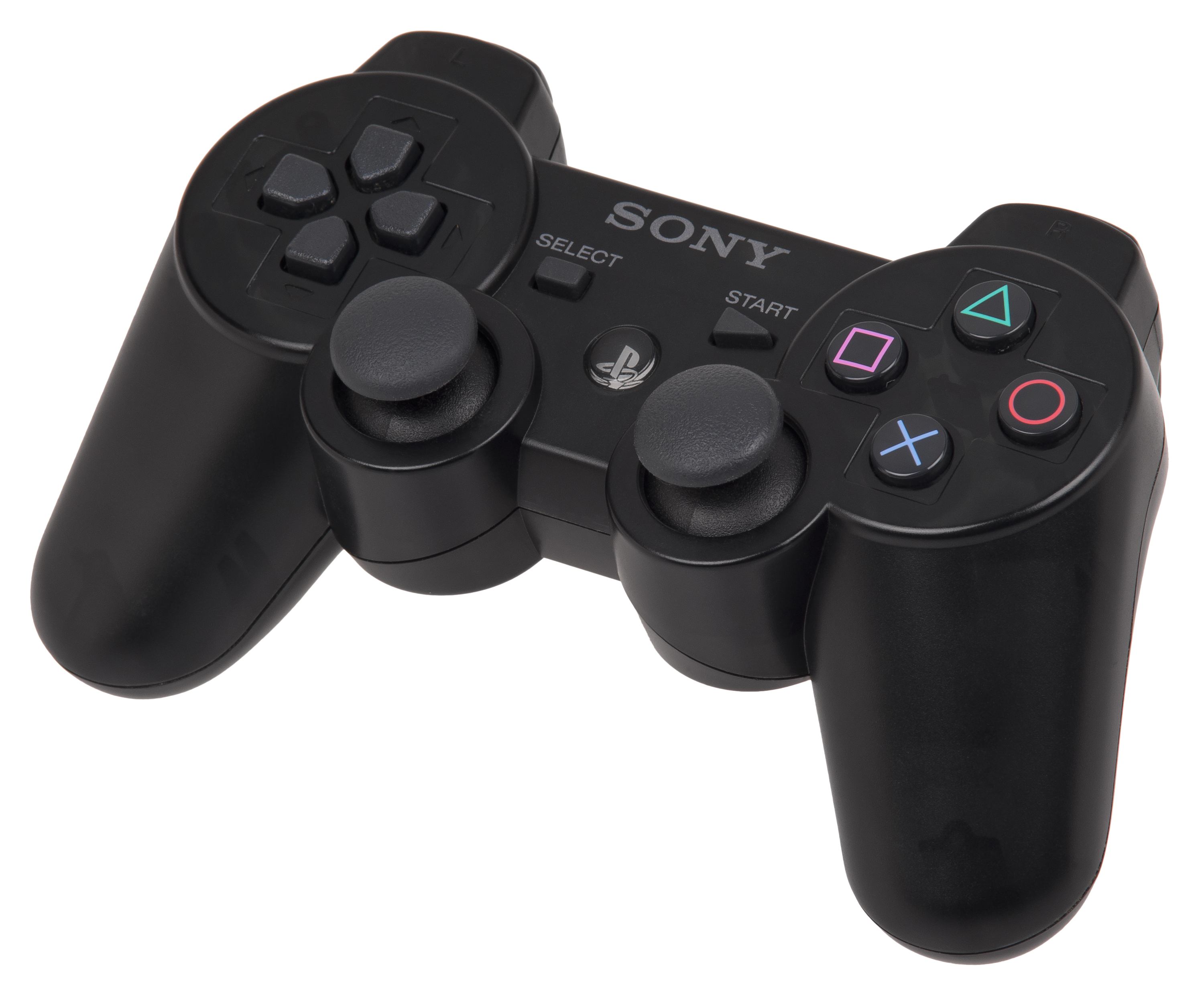
Sixaxis controller

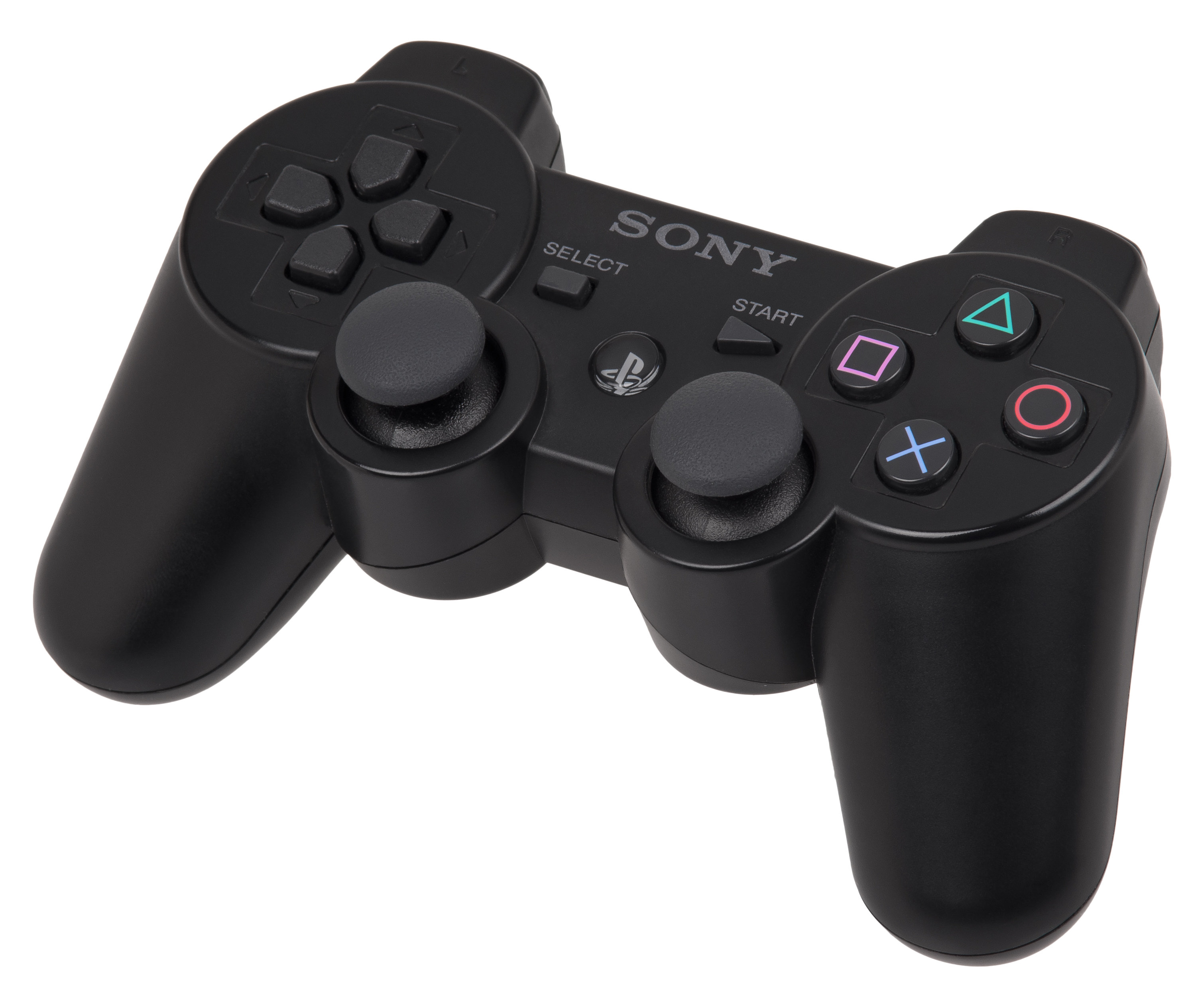
DualShock 3 controller

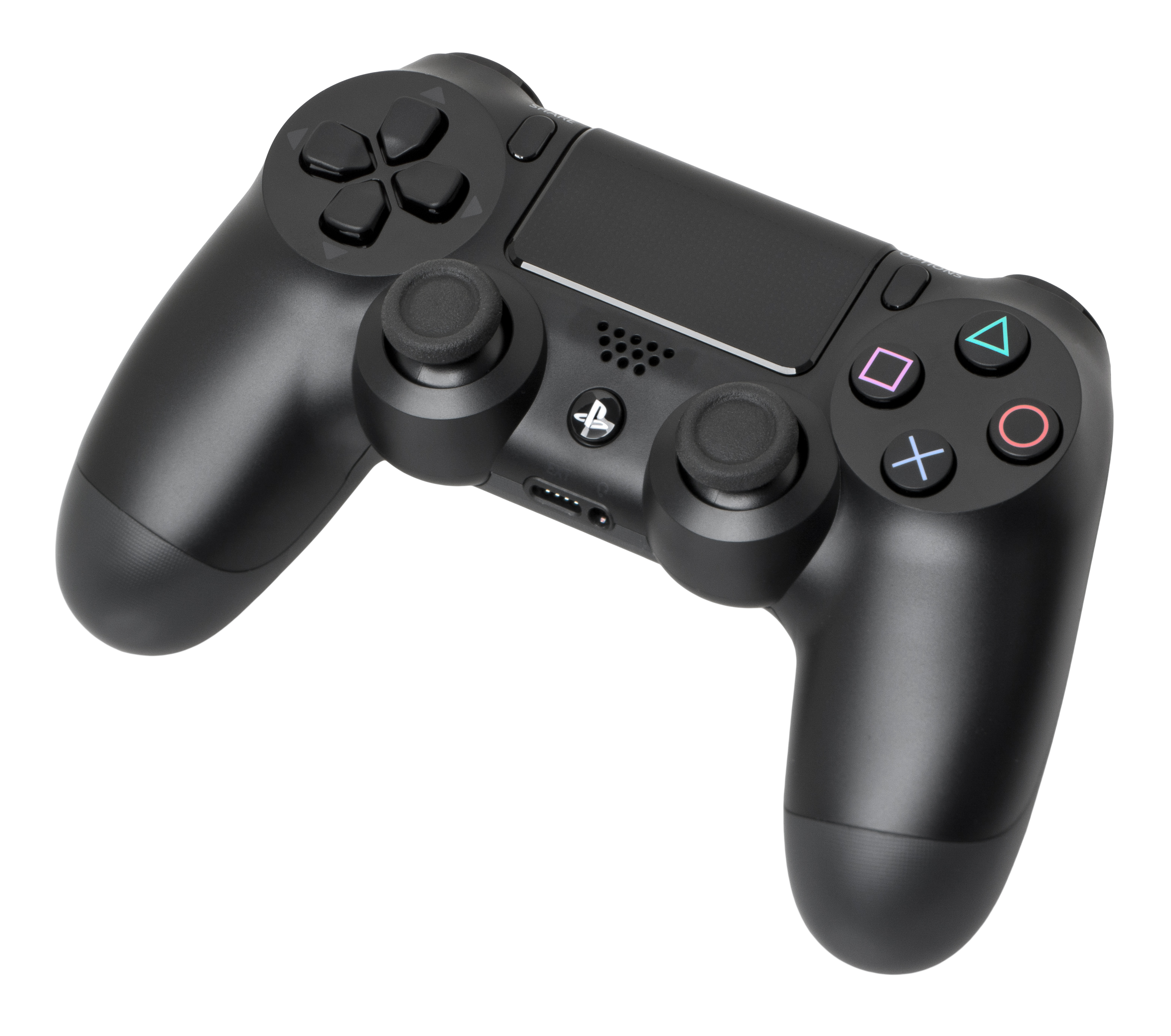
DualShock 4 controller

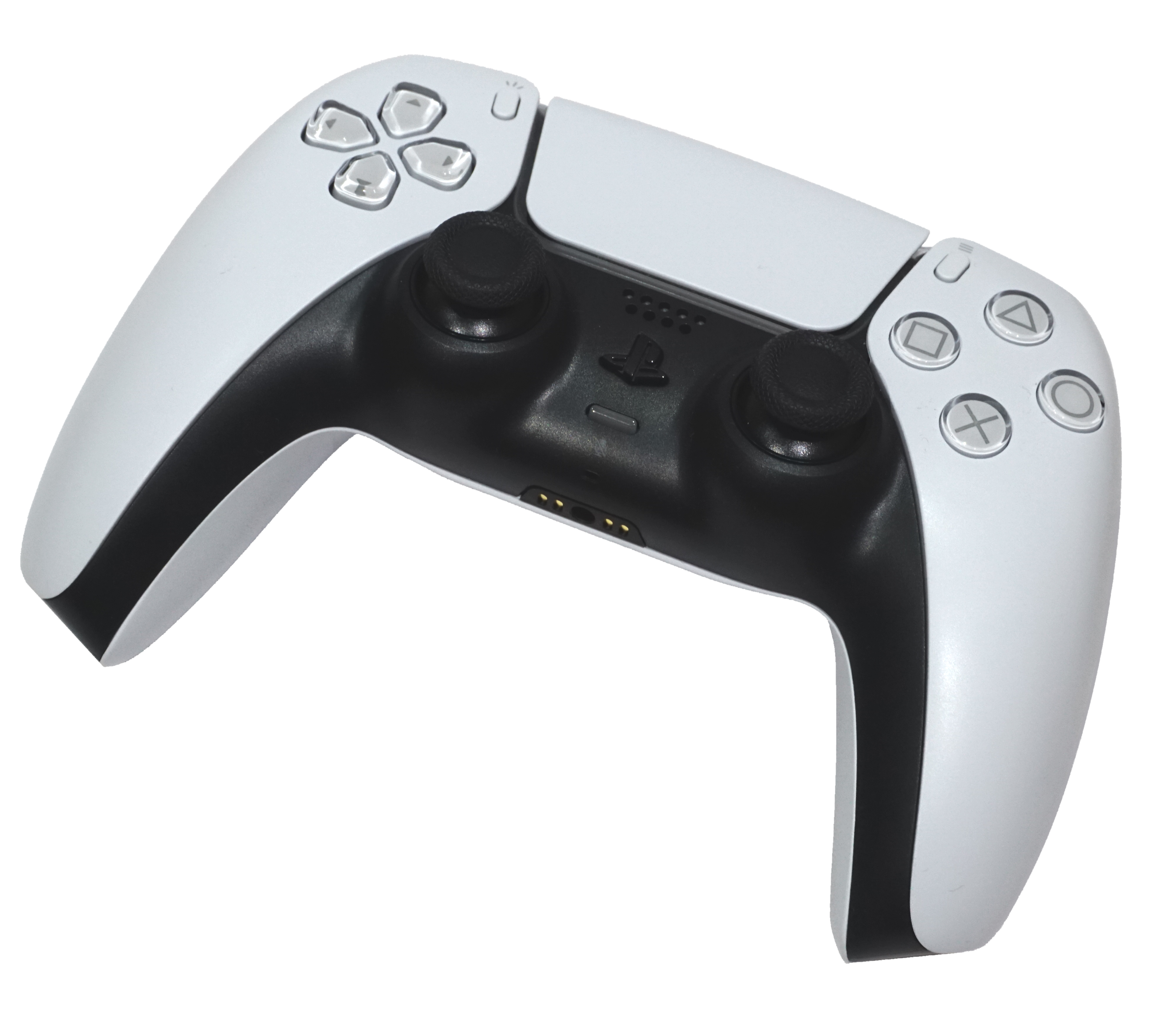
DualSense controller

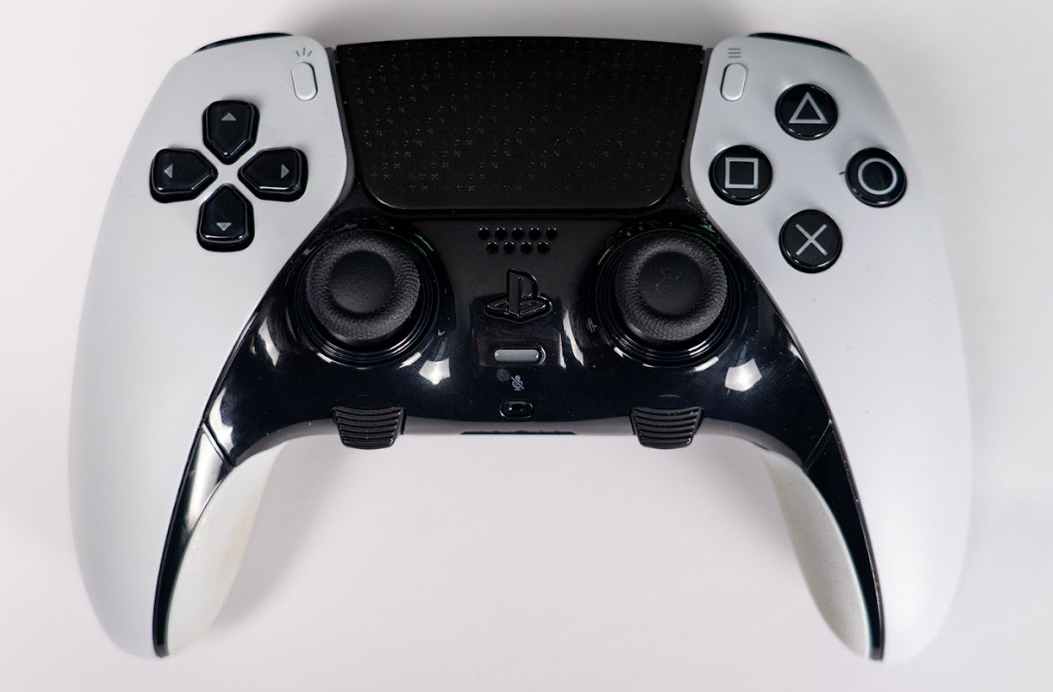
DualSense Edge controller

Released in 1998, the DualShock controller for the PlayStation succeeded its predecessor, the Dual Analog, and became the longest-running series of controllers for the PlayStation brand. In addition to the inputs of the original, digital controller (L1, L2, R1, R2, Start, Select and a D-pad), the DualShock featured two analog sticks similarly to the previous Dual Analog controller, which can also be depressed to activate the L3 and R3 buttons.

The DualShock series consists of four controllers: the DualShock which was the fourth controller released for the PlayStation; the DualShock 2, the only standard controller released for the PlayStation 2, and the DualShock 3, the second and current controller released for the PlayStation 3, and the DualShock 4, which went through a massive redesign and is the default input of the PlayStation 4, and upon release was compatible with the PS3 originally only via USB and eventually with a firmware update, Bluetooth connectivity was enabled. The Sixaxis was the first official controller for the PlayStation 3, and is based on the same design as the DualShock series (but lacking the vibration motors of the DualShock series of controllers).

Like the Dual Analog, the DualShock and DualShock 2 feature an "Analog" button between the analog sticks that toggles the analog sticks on and off (for use with games which support only the digital input of the original controller). On the PlayStation 3 Sixaxis and DualShock 3 controllers, the analog sticks are always enabled. Beginning with the Sixaxis, a 'PlayStation button' (which featured the incorporated PS logo and is similar in function to the Xbox 360 "Guide" button) was included on controllers. The PlayStation button replaces the "Analog" button of the DualShock and DualShock 2 controllers. Pressing the PS button on the PS3 brings up the XMB, while holding it down brings up system options, known as "Quick Menu" on the PS4 (such as quit the game, change controller settings, turn off the system, and turn off the controller).

=== PlayStation Move ===
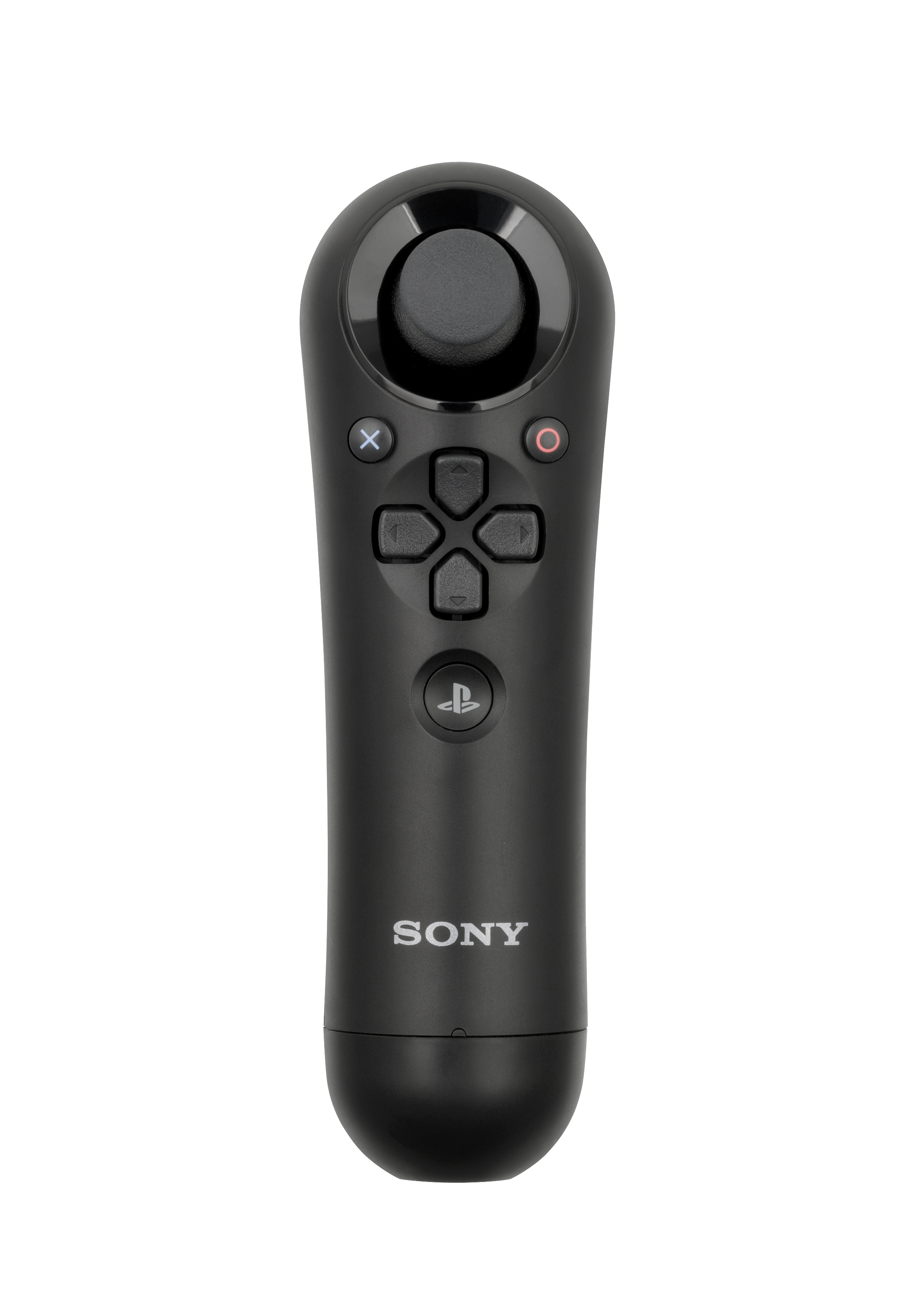
PlayStation Move navigation controller

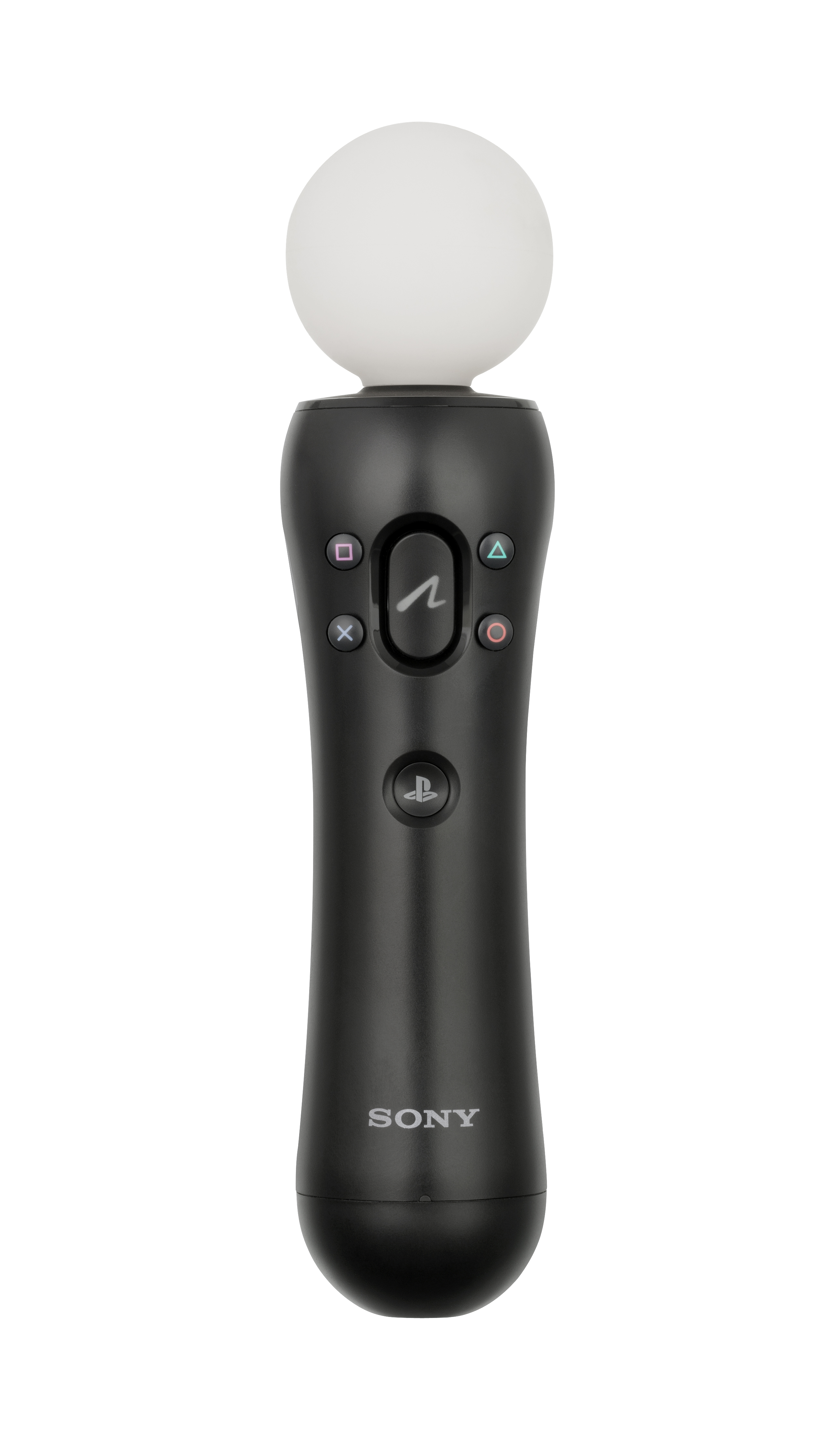
PlayStation Move controller

PlayStation Move is a motion-sensing game controller platform for the PlayStation 3, PlayStation 4, and PlayStation VR video game consoles by Sony Computer Entertainment (SCE). Based on the handheld motion controller wand, PlayStation Move uses the PlayStation Eye (PS3) and PlayStation Camera (PS4, PSVR) webcams to track the wand's position and the inertial sensors in the wand to detect its motion. First revealed on June 2, 2009, PlayStation Move was launched in Q3/Q4 2010. Hardware available at launch included the main PlayStation Move motion controller and an optional PlayStation Move sub-controller. Although PlayStation Move is implemented on the existing PlayStation 3 console, Sony stated that it is treating Move's debut as its own major "platform launch", planning an aggressive marketing campaign to support it. In addition to selling the controllers individually, Sony also planned to provide several different bundle options for PlayStation Move hardware; including a starter kit with a PS Eye, a Move motion controller, and a demo/sampler disc, priced under US$100; a full console pack with a PS3 console, DualShock 3 gamepad, PS Eye, and Move motion controller; and bundles of a Move motion controller with select games. The PlayStation Move was compatible with the PS4, although in a limited number of games, and then repurposed as motion controllers for the PlayStation VR.

== Other hardware ==
=== LCD Screen for PSone ===
Released in 2000, an optional 5-inch LCD screen (SCPH-131) was released for the PSone (a redesigned version of the original PlayStation), featuring built-in speakers and a headphone jack, as well as an AV input jack. It was later included as a pack-in bundle with the PSone called the "Combo Pack" in 2002.

=== PSX (2003) ===
Released solely in Japan in 2003, the Sony PSX was a fully integrated DVR and PlayStation 2 video game console. It was the first Sony product to utilize the XrossMediaBar (XMB) and can be linked with a PlayStation Portable to transfer videos and music via USB. It also features software for video, photo and audio editing. PSX supports online game compatibility using an internal broadband adapter. Games that utilize the PS2 HDD (for example, Final Fantasy XI) are supported as well. It was the first product released by Sony under the PlayStation brand that did not include a controller with the device itself.

=== Television sets ===
Released in 2010, the Sony BRAVIA KDL22PX300 is a 22-inch (56 cm) 720p television which incorporates a PlayStation 2 console, along with 4 HDMI ports.

A 24-inch 1080p PlayStation branded 3D television, officially called the PlayStation 3D Display, was released in late 2011. A feature of this 3D television is SimulView. During multiplayer games, each player will only see their respective screen (in full HD) appear on the television through their respective 3D glasses, instead of seeing a split screen (e.g. player 1 will only see player 1's screen displayed through their 3D glasses).

=== PlayTV ===
PlayTV is an add-on unit for the PlayStation 3 that allows the PS3 to act as an HDTV or DTV receiver, as well as a digital video recorder (DVR).

=== Sony Ericsson Xperia Play ===
The Xperia Play is an Android-powered smartphone with a slide-up gamepad resembling the PSP Go developed by Sony Ericsson aimed at gamers and is the first to be PlayStation Certified.

=== Sony Tablets ===
Sony Tablets are PlayStation Certified Android tablets, released in 2011, 2012, and 2013. They offer connectivity with PlayStation 3 controllers and integrate with the PlayStation Network using a proprietary application. The following models were released between 2011 and 2013: Sony Tablet S, Sony Tablet P, Xperia Tablet S and Xperia Tablet Z.

=== PlayStation VR ===
PlayStation VR is a virtual reality device that is produced by Sony Computer Entertainment. It features a 5.7-inch 1920×1080 resolution OLED display, and operates at 120 Hz which can eliminate blur and produce a smooth image; the device also has a low latency of less than 18ms. Additionally, it produces two sets of images, one being visible on a TV and one for the headset, and includes 3D audio technology so the player can hear from all angles. The PlayStation VR was released in October 2016.

=== PlayStation Classic ===
The PlayStation Classic is a miniature version of the original 1994 Model SCPH-1001 PlayStation console that comes preloaded with 20 games and two original-style controllers. It was launched on the 24th anniversary of the original console on December 3, 2018.

=== PlayStation Portal ===
In early 2023, Sony announced the development of a new portable system (originally announced under the codename Project Q) that can stream PS5 games from a home console, and on August 23, 2023, it was officially unveiled as PlayStation Portal. It released on November 15, 2023, for $199.99.

=== Image gallery ===
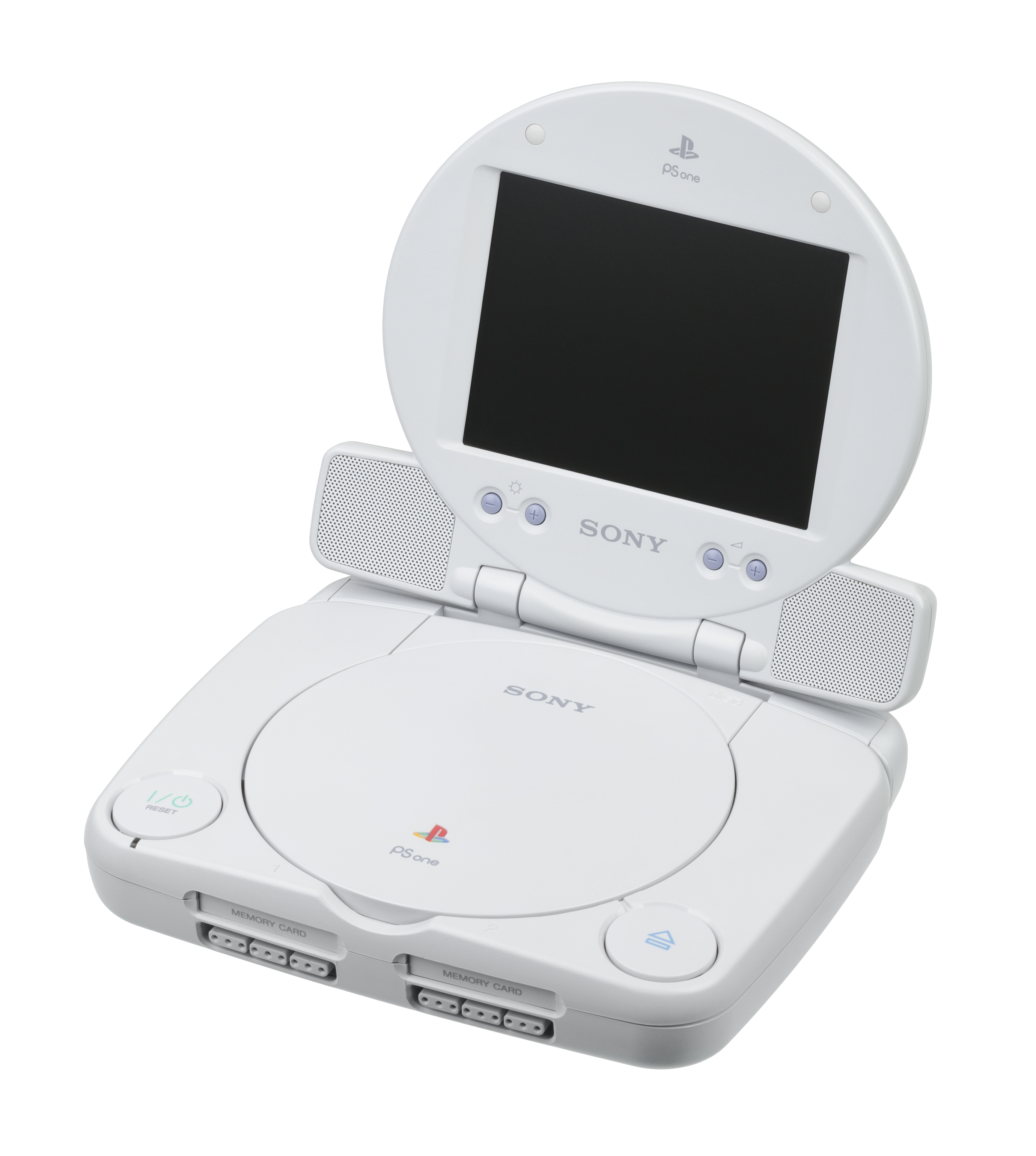
LCD screen for PSone

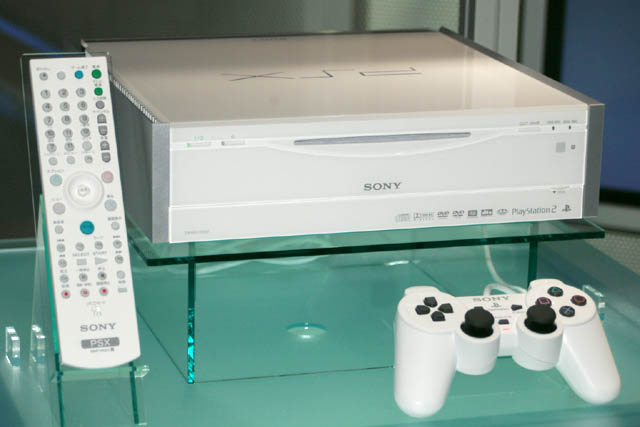
PSX

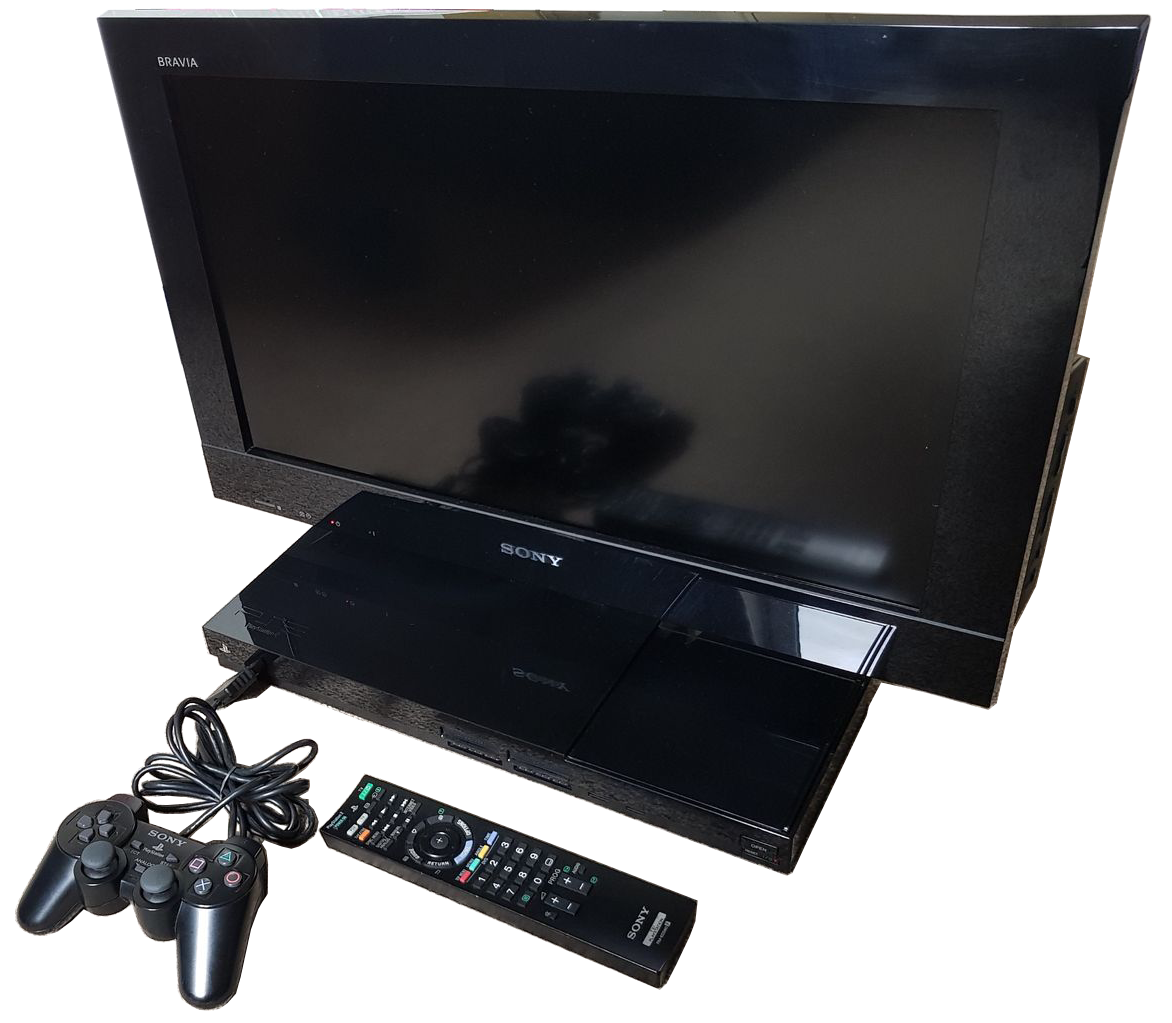
BRAVIA KDL22PX300

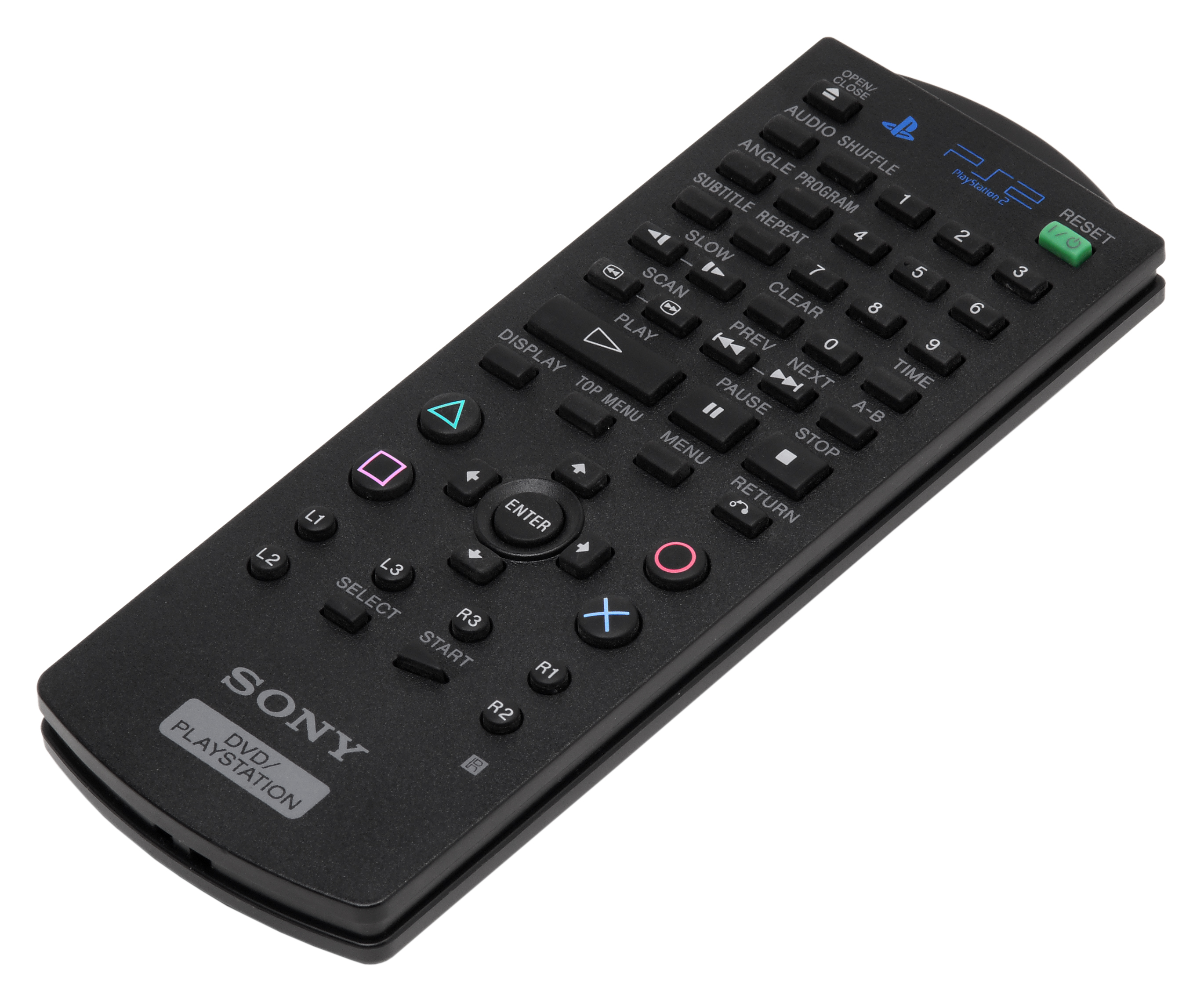
The official PS2 DVD remote control

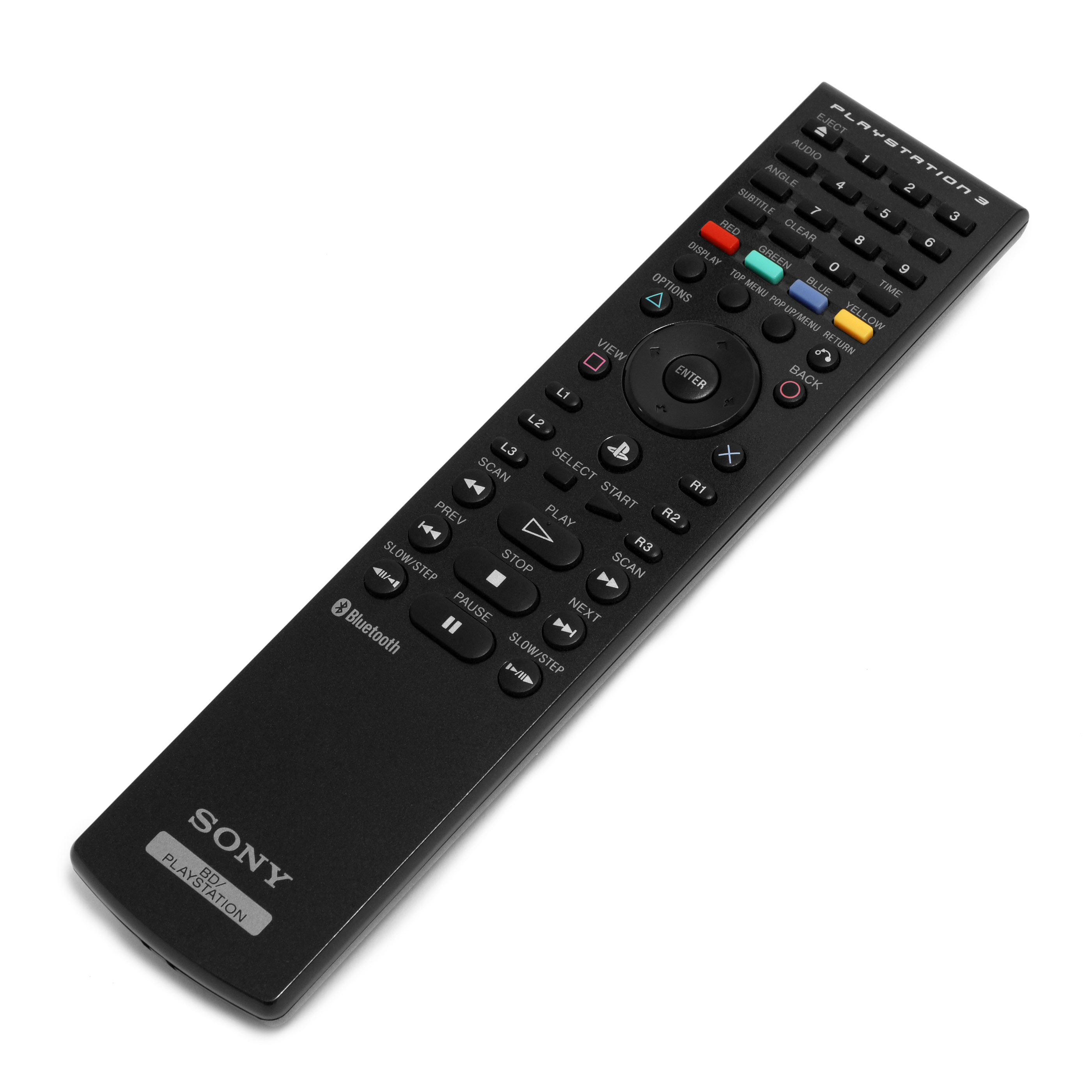
The official PlayStation 3 Bluetooth remote control

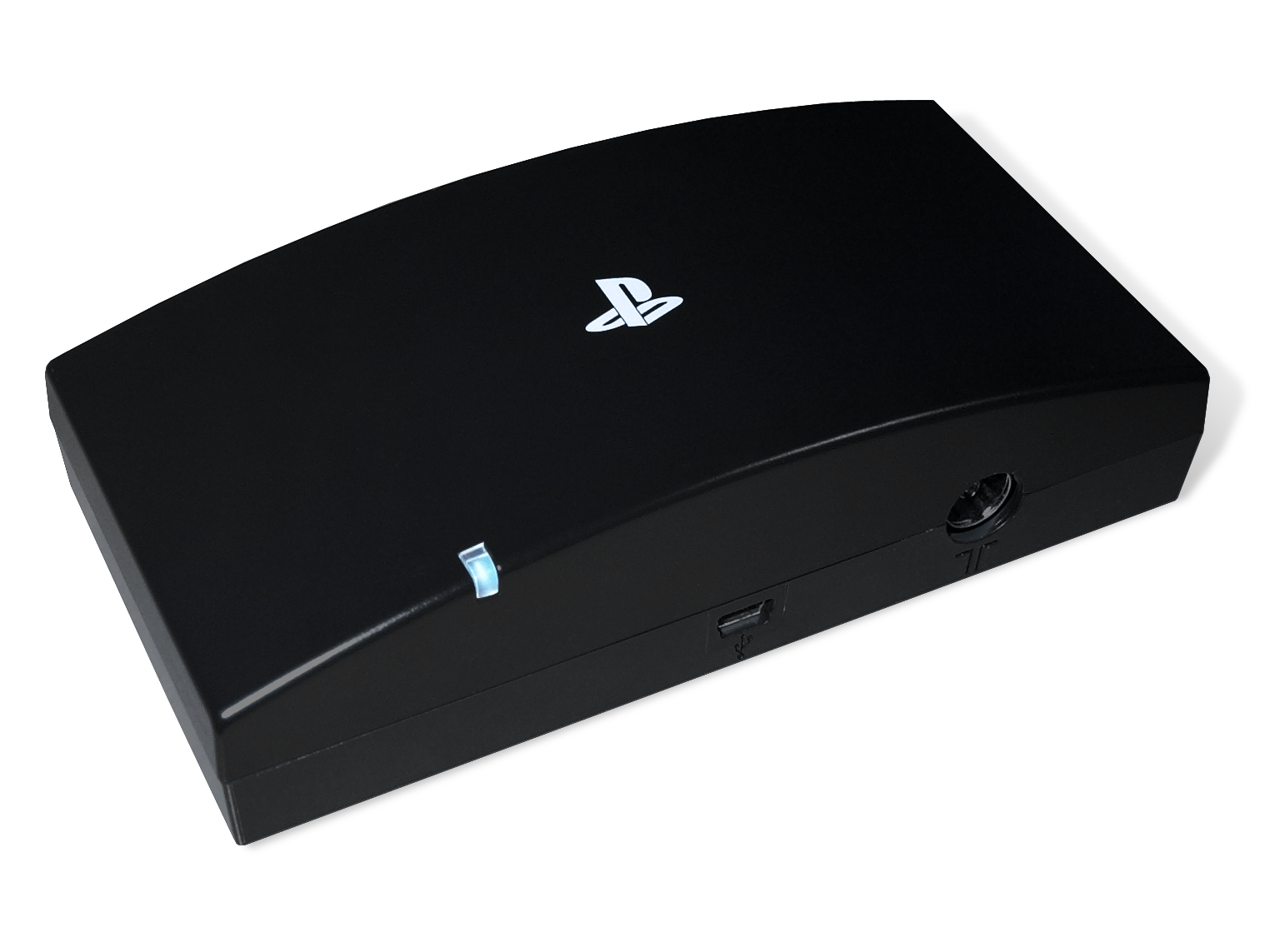
PlayTV

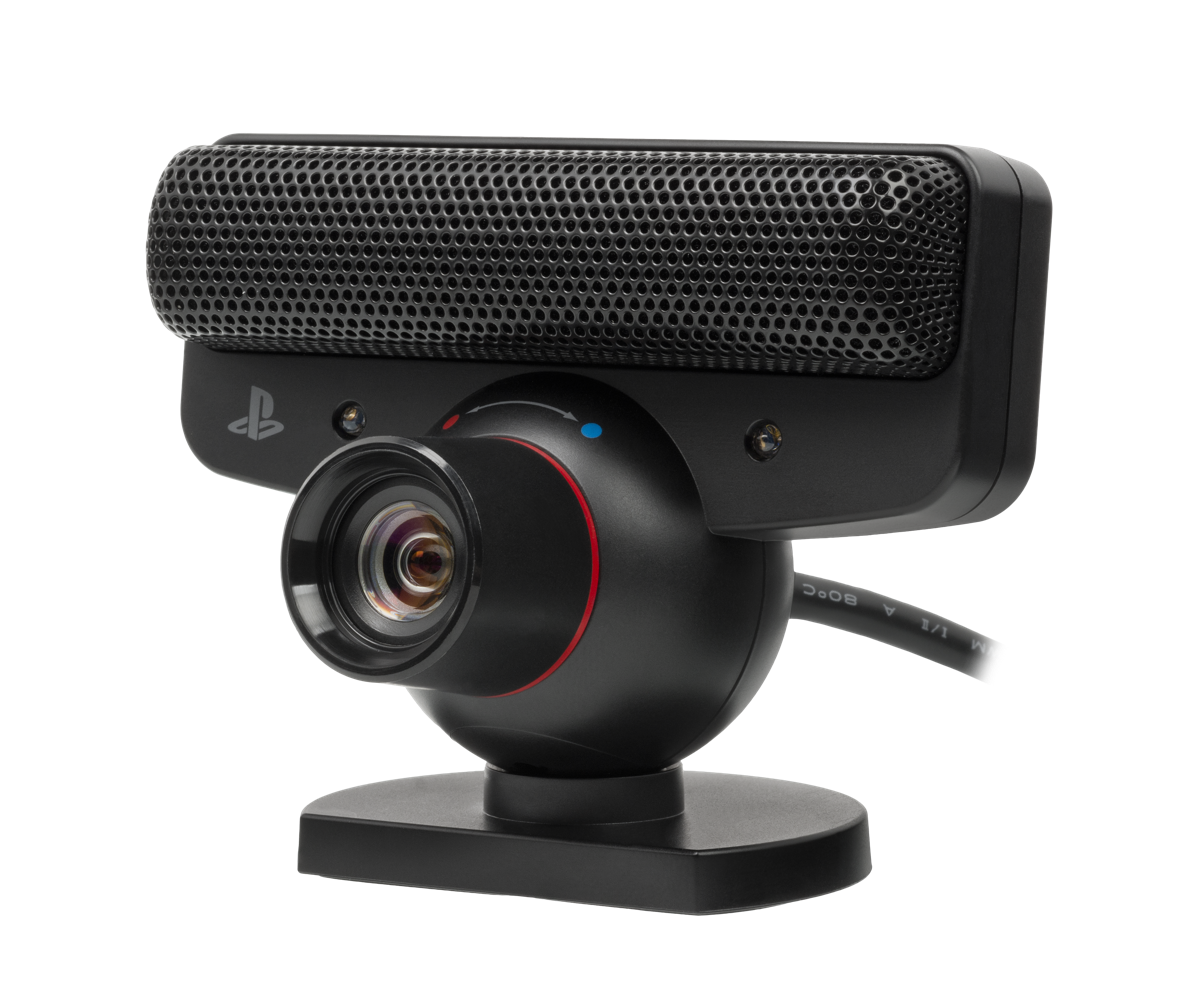
PlayStation Eye

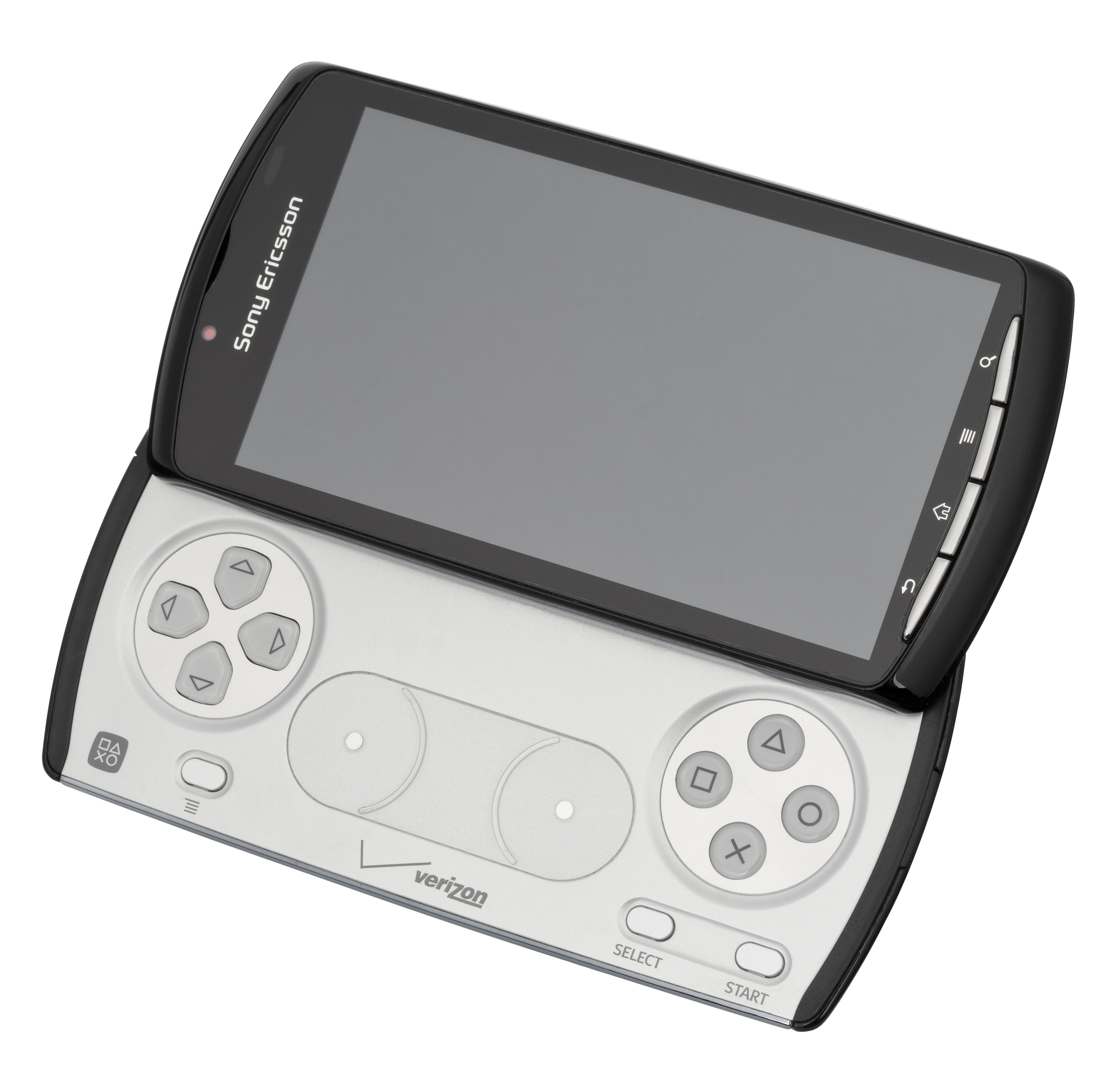
Xperia Play
(open position)

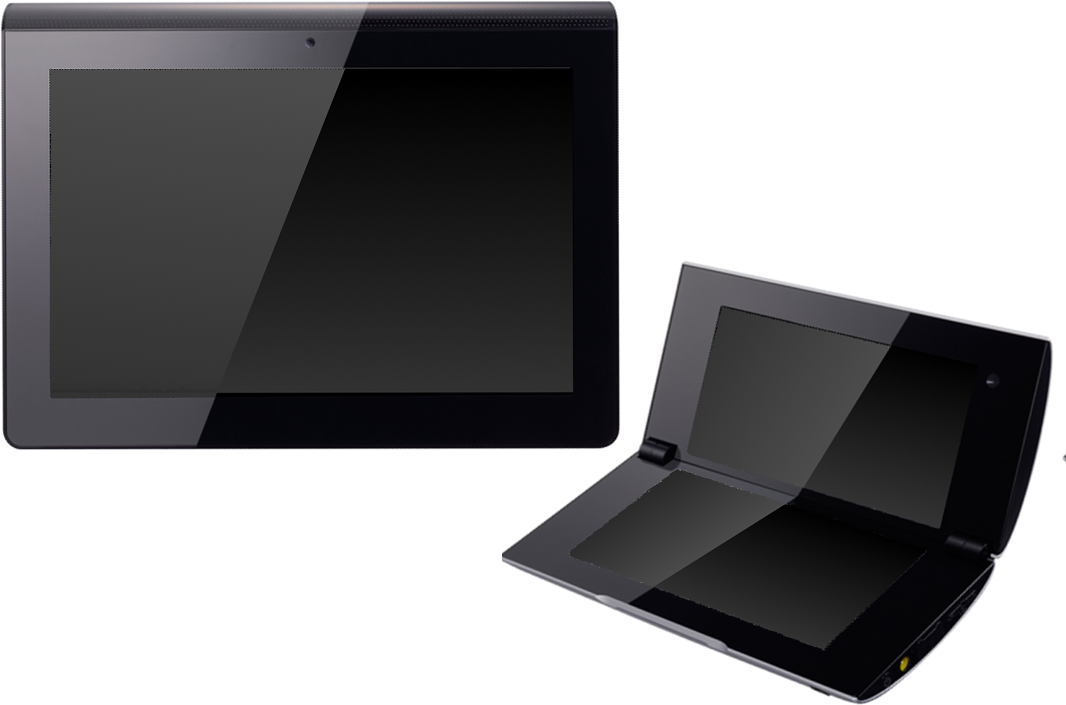
Sony Tablet

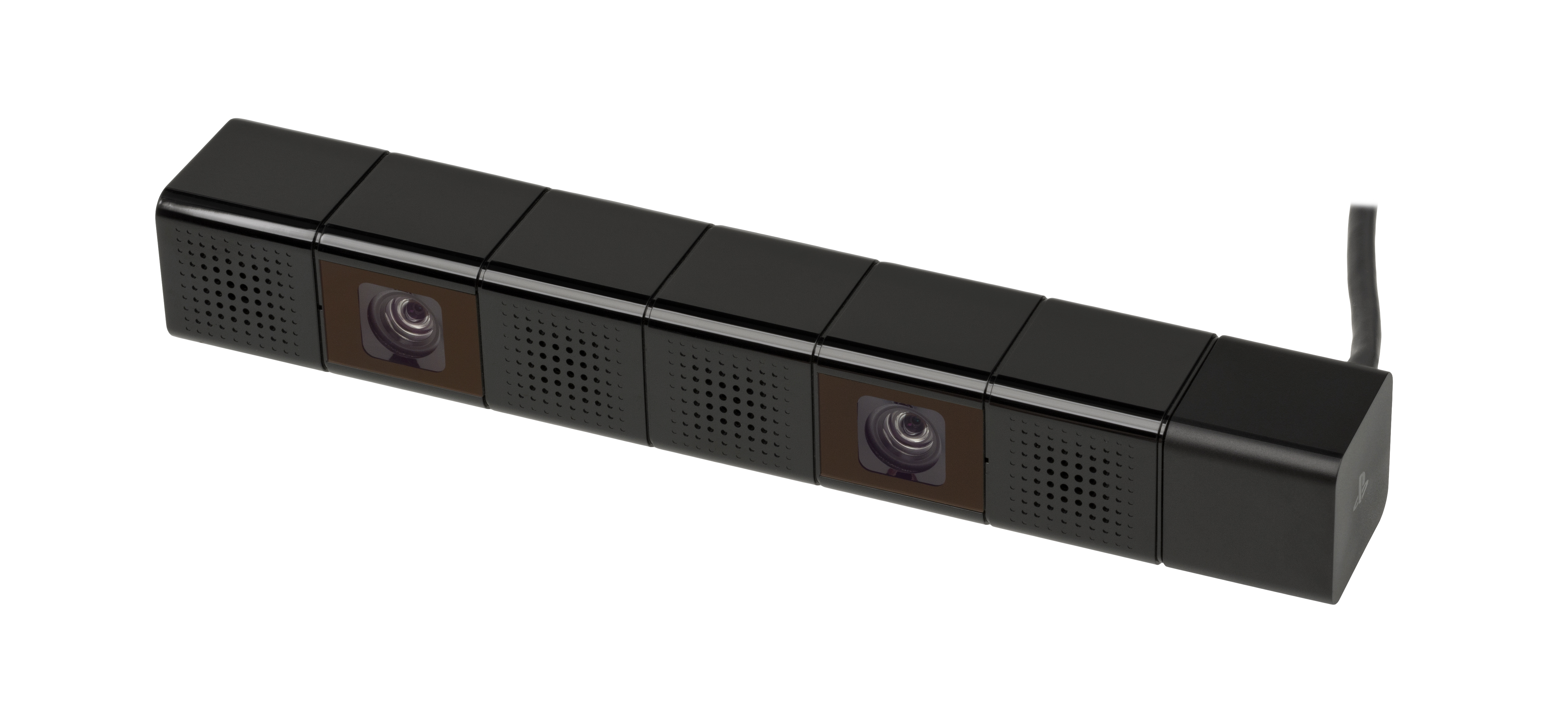
PlayStation Camera

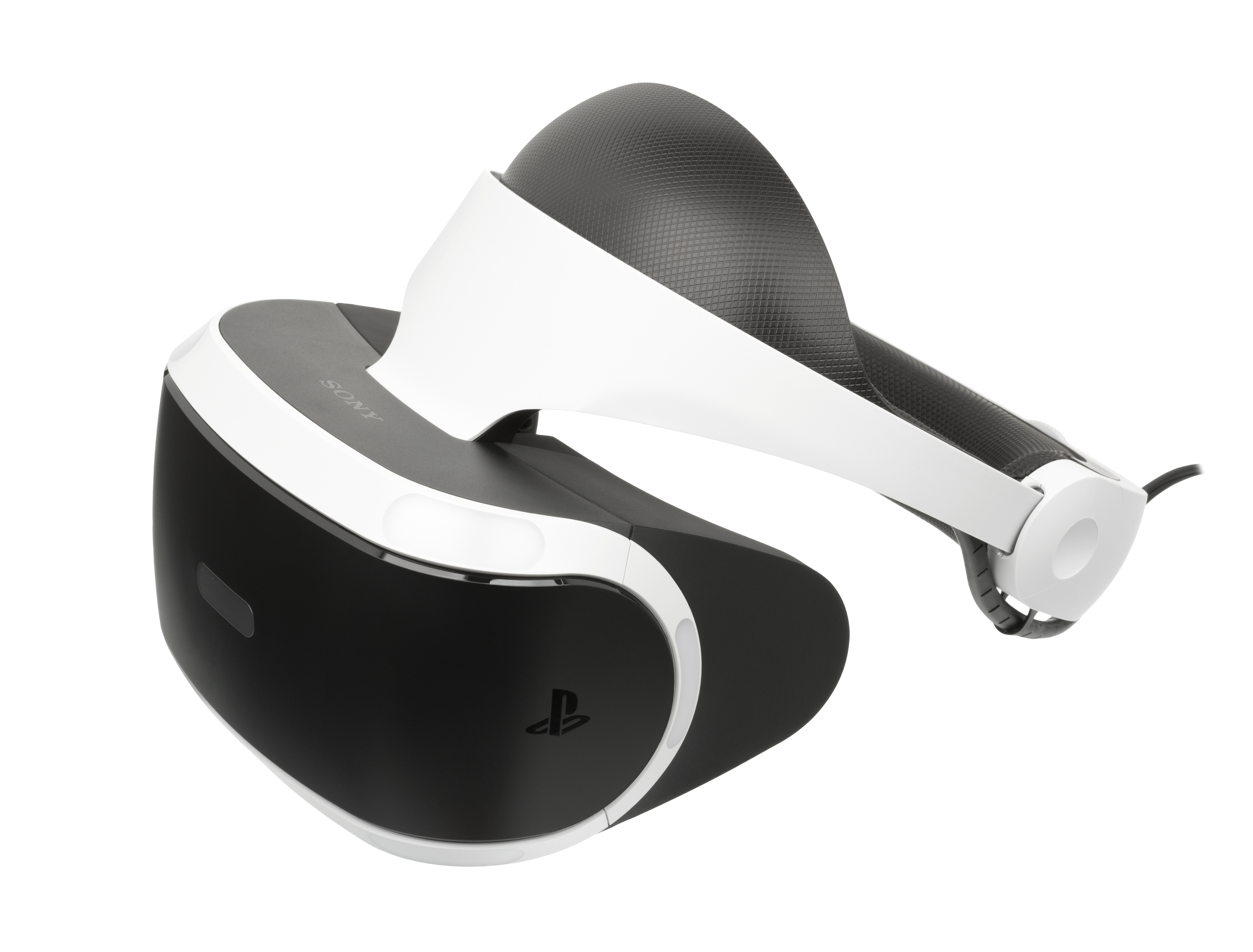
PlayStation VR

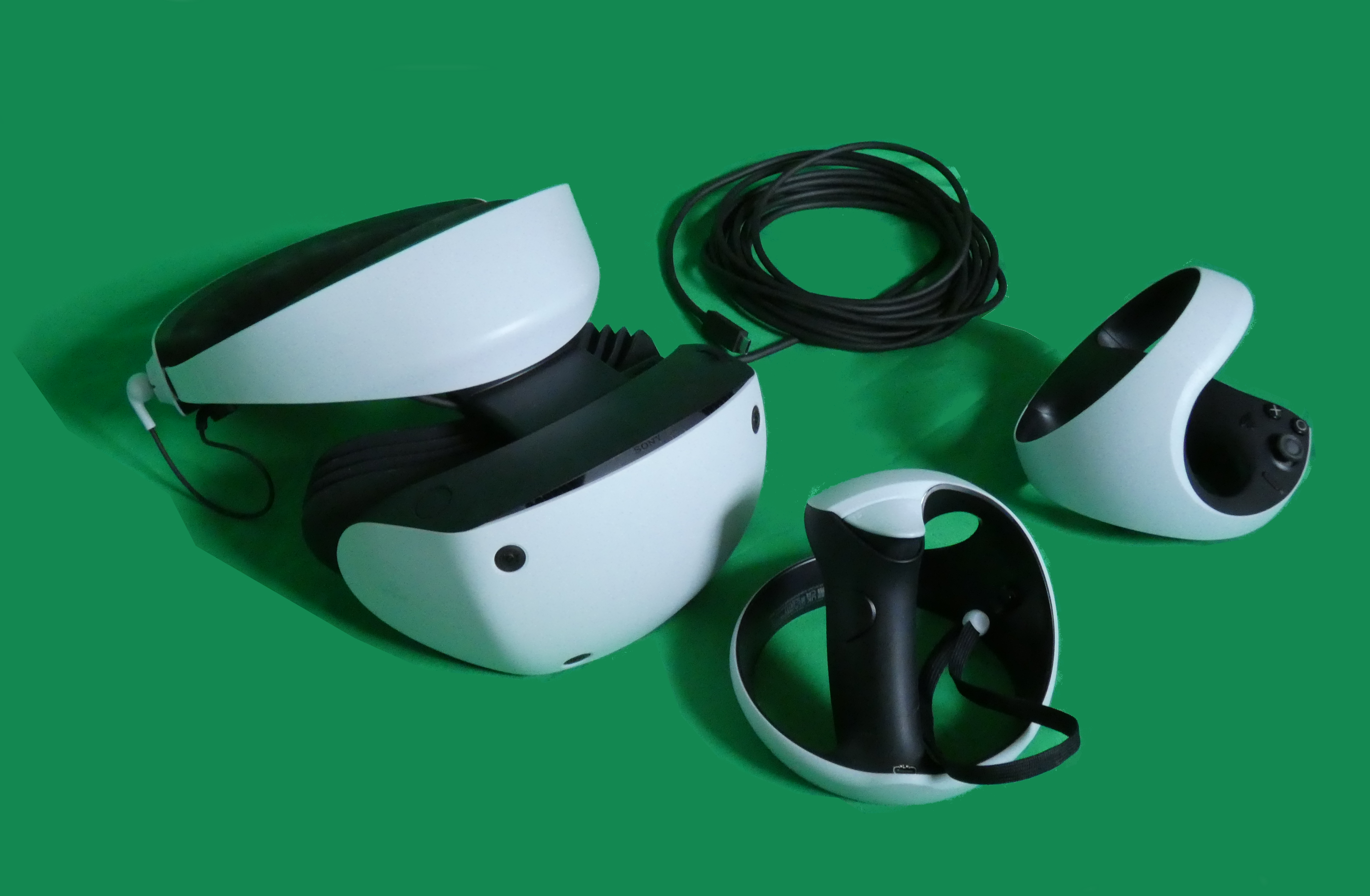
PlayStation VR2

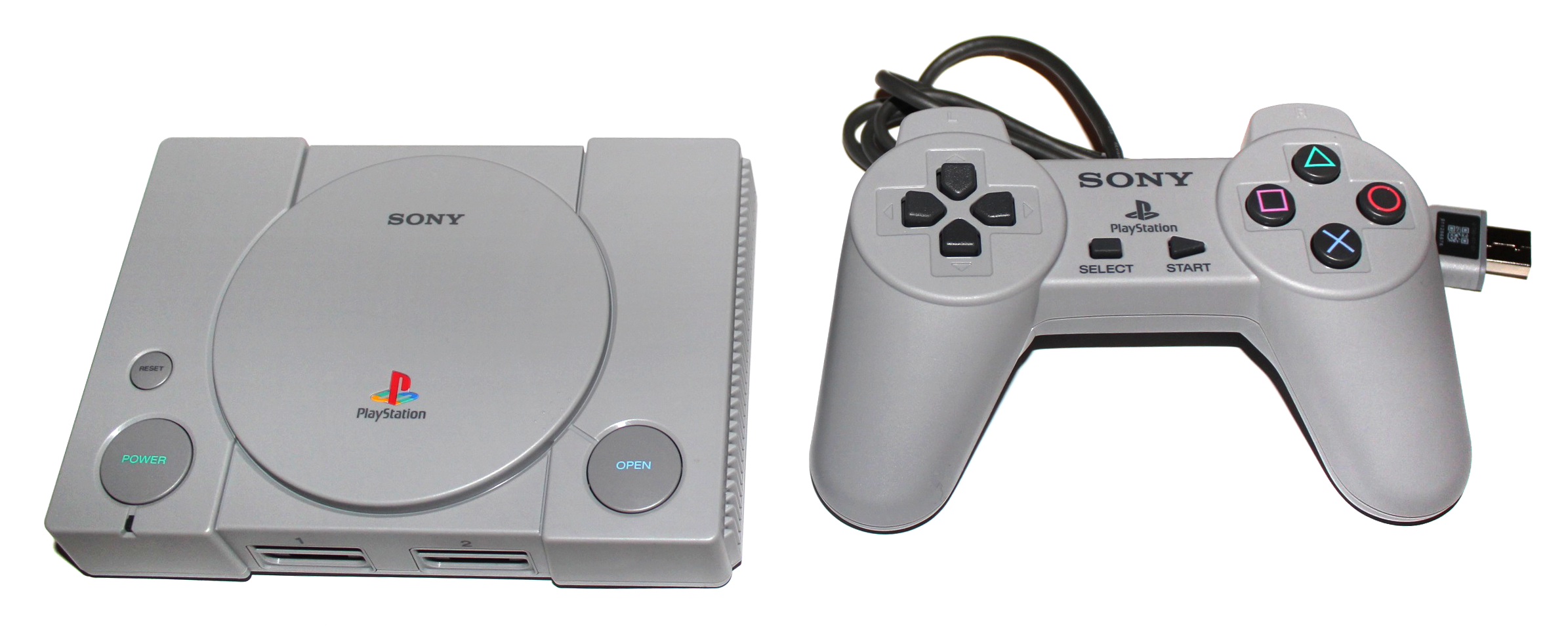
PlayStation Classic

== Games ==
Each console has a variety of games. The PlayStation 2, PSX and PlayStation 3 exhibit backwards compatibility and can play most of the games released on the original PlayStation. Some of these games can also be played on the PlayStation Portable but they must be purchased and downloaded from a list of PS one Classics from the PlayStation Store. Games released on the PlayStation 2 can currently only be played on the original console as well as the PSX and the early models of the PlayStation 3 which are backwards compatible. The PlayStation 3 has two types of games: those released on Blu-ray Discs and downloadable games from the PlayStation Store. The PlayStation Portable consists of numerous games available on both its physical media, the Universal Media Disc and Digital Download from the PlayStation Store. However, some games are only available on the UMD while others are only available on the PlayStation Store. The PlayStation Vita consists of games available on both its physical media, the PlayStation Vita card and digital download from the PlayStation Store.

On July 1, 2026, Sony announced that, from January 2028, new PlayStation games will no longer release on physical discs. Games will still be sold in stores, but the box will contain a digital download code instead of a disc.

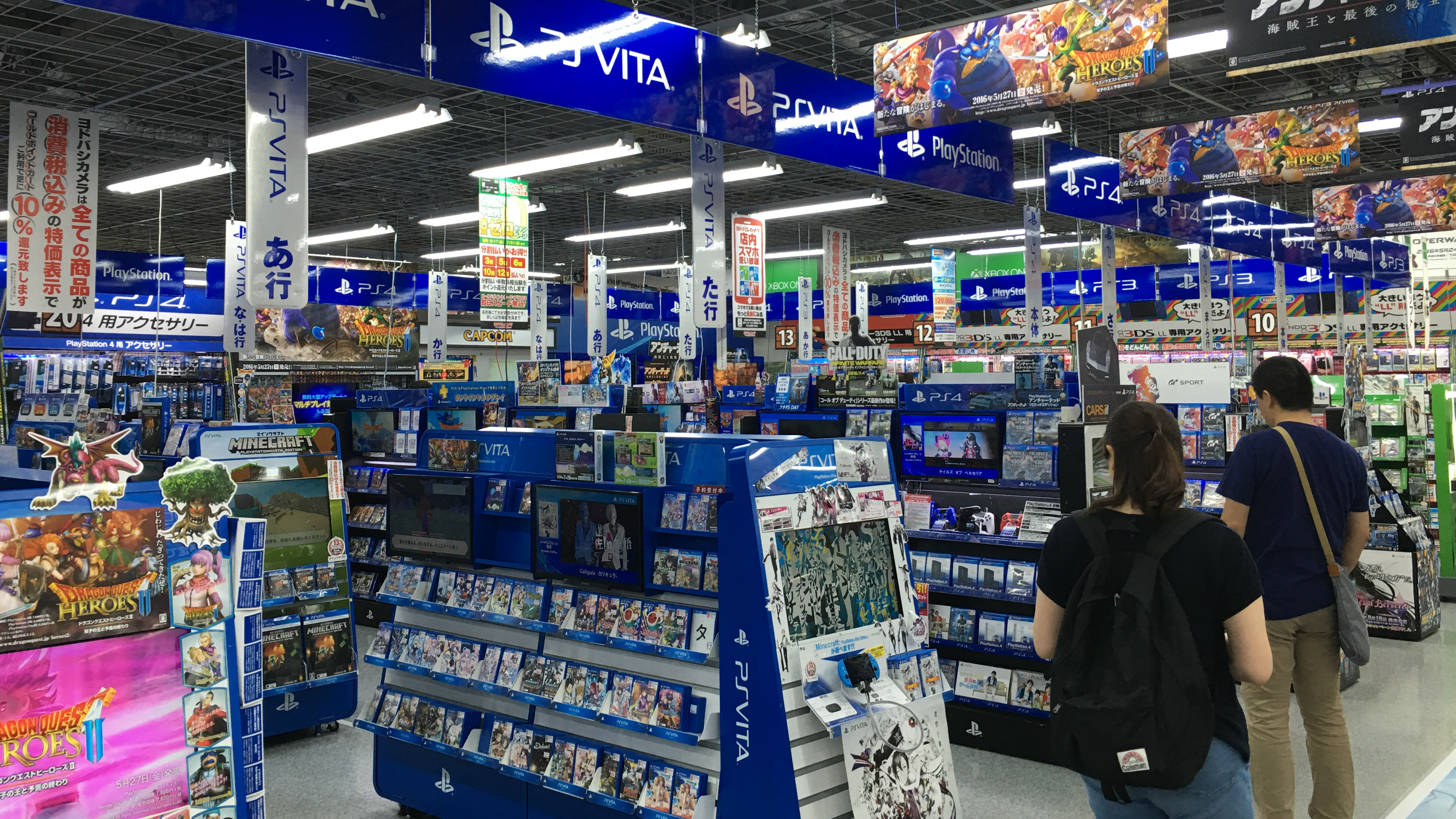
PlayStation games in Japanese store

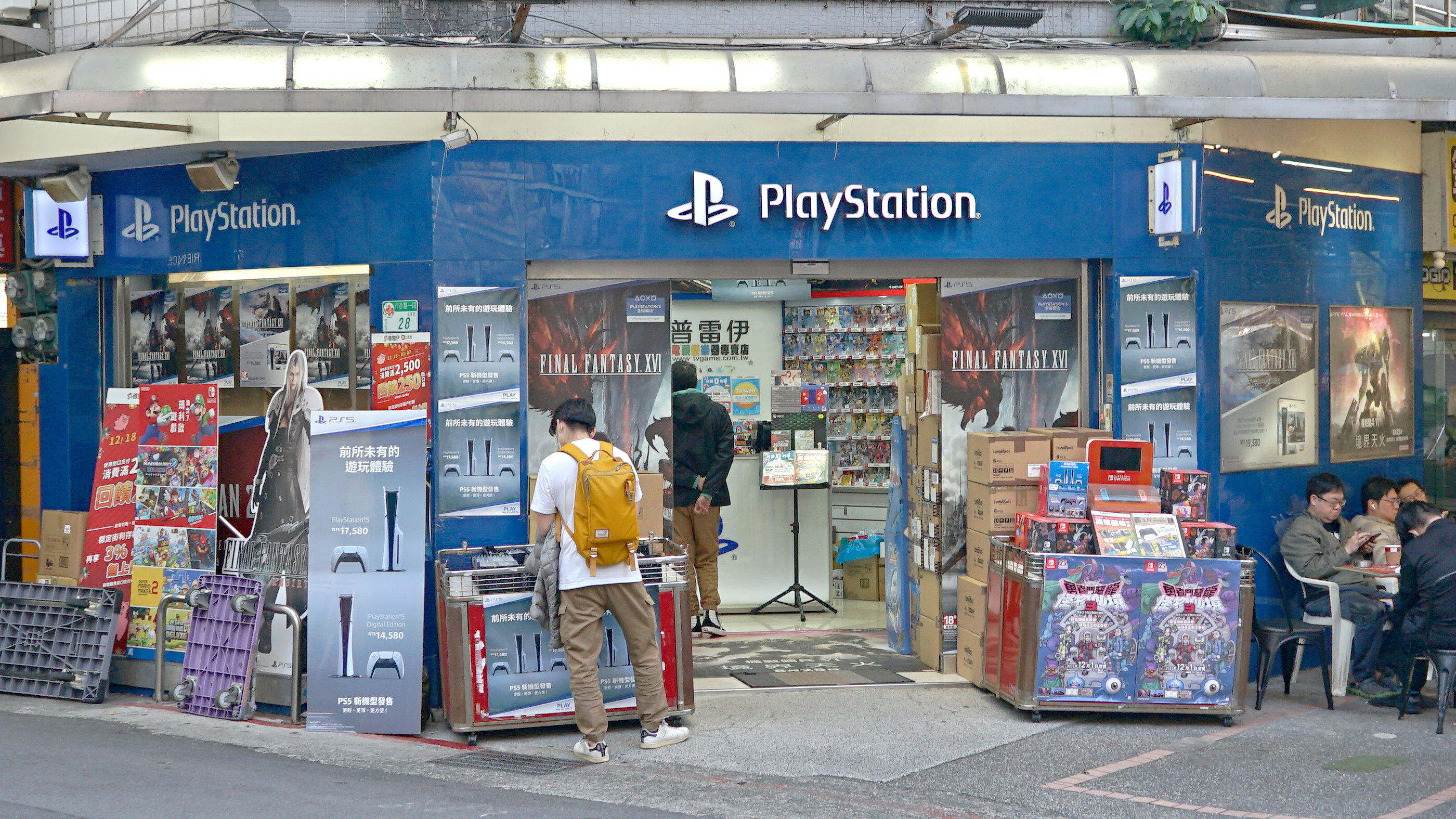
PlayStation store in Taiwan

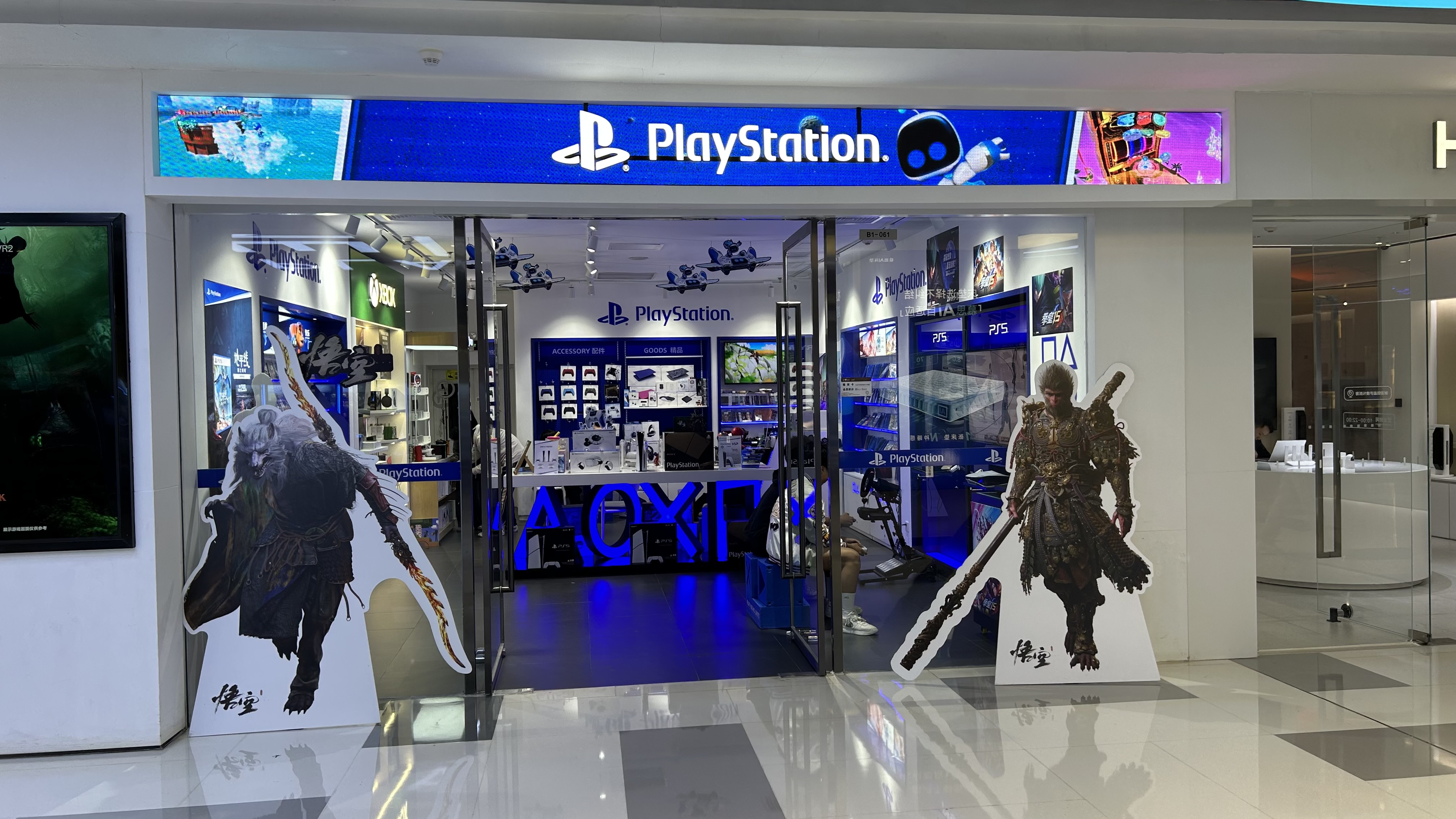
PlayStation store in China

=== First party games ===
PlayStation Studios logo

PlayStation Studios is a group of video game developers owned by Sony Interactive Entertainment. It is dedicated to developing video games exclusively for the PlayStation series of consoles. The series has produced several best-selling franchises such as the Gran Turismo series of racing video games as well as critically acclaimed titles such as the Uncharted series. Other notable franchises include God of War, Ratchet & Clank, Twisted Metal and more recently, LittleBigPlanet, Infamous, The Last of Us and Spider-Man.

=== Re-releases ===
Greatest Hits (North America), Platinum Range (PAL territories) and The Best (Japan and Asia) are video games for the Sony PlayStation, PlayStation 2, PlayStation 3, and PlayStation Portable consoles that have been officially re-released at a lower price by Sony. Each region has its own qualifications to enter the re-release program. Initially, during the PlayStation era, a game had to sell at least 150,000 copies (later 250,000) and be on the market for at least a year to enter the Greatest Hits range. During the PlayStation 2 era, the requirements increased with the minimum number of copies sold increasing to 400,000 and the game had to be on the market for at least 9 months. For the PlayStation Portable, games had to be on the market for at least 9 months with 250,000 copies or more sold. Currently, a PlayStation 3 game must be on the market for 10 months and sell at least 500,000 copies to meet the Greatest Hits criteria. PS one Classics were games that were released originally on the PlayStation and have been re-released on the PlayStation Store for the PlayStation 3 and PlayStation Portable. Classics HD are compilations of PlayStation 2 games that have been remastered for the PlayStation 3 on a single disc with additional features such as upscaled graphics, PlayStation Move support, 3D support and PlayStation Network trophies. PlayStation Mobile (formerly PlayStation Suite) is a cross-platform, cross-device software framework aimed at providing PlayStation content, currently original PlayStation games, across several devices including PlayStation Certified Android devices as well as the PlayStation Vita.

=== PlayStation Indies ===
Sony has generally supported indie game development since incorporating the digital distribution storefront in the PlayStation 3, though initially required developers to complete multiple steps to get an indie game certified on the platform. Sony improved and simplified the process in transitioning to the PlayStation 4.

As Sony prepared to transition from the PlayStation 4 to PlayStation 5, they introduced a new PlayStation Indies program led by Shuhei Yoshida in July 2020. The program's goals are to spotlight new and upcoming indie titles for the PlayStation 4 and 5, focusing on those that are more innovative and novel, akin to past titles such as PaRappa the Rapper, Katamari Damacy, LittleBigPlanet, and Journey. Sony also anticipates bringing more indie titles to the PlayStation Now series as part of this program.

== Online services ==
=== PlayStation 2 online service ===
Online gaming on PlayStation consoles first started in July 2001 with the release of PlayStation 2's unnamed online service in Japan. Later in August 2002 it was released in North America, followed by the European release in June 2003. This service was shut down on March 31, 2016.

=== PlayStation Network ===
Released in 2006, the PlayStation Network is an online service focusing on online multiplayer gaming and digital media delivery. The service is provided and run by Sony Computer Entertainment for use with the PlayStation 3, and was later implemented on the PlayStation Portable, PlayStation Vita, PlayStation 4 and PlayStation 5 video game consoles. The service has over 103 million active users monthly (as of December 2019). The Sony Entertainment Network provides other features for users like PlayStation Home, PlayStation Store, and Trophies.

=== PlayStation Store ===
The PlayStation Store is an online virtual market available to users of the PlayStation 3, PlayStation 4, PlayStation 5 and PlayStation Portable game consoles via the PlayStation Network. The store uses both physical currency and PlayStation Network Cards. The PlayStation Store's gaming content is updated every Tuesday and offers a range of downloadable content both for purchase and available free of charge. Available content includes full games, add-on content, playable demos, themes and game and movie trailers. The service is accessible through an icon on the XMB on the PS3 and PSP. The PS3 store can also be accessed on the PSP via a Remote Play connection to the PS3. The PSP store is also available via the PC application, Media Go. As of September 24, 2009, there have been more than 600 million downloads from the PlayStation Store worldwide.

=== Life with PlayStation ===
Life with PlayStation was a Folding@home application available for PlayStation 3 which connected to Stanford University's Folding@home distributed computer network and allowed the user to donate their console's spare processing cycles to the project. Folding@home is supported by Stanford University and volunteers make a contribution to society by donating computing power to this project. Research made by the project may eventually contribute to the creation of vital cures. The Folding@home client was developed by Sony Computer Entertainment in collaboration with Stanford University. Life with PlayStation also consisted of a 3D virtual view of the Earth and contained current weather and news information of various cities and countries from around the world, as well as a World Heritage channel which offered information about historical sites, and the United Village channel which is a project designed to share information about communities and cultures worldwide. As of PlayStation 3 system software update version 4.30 on October 24, 2012, the Life With PlayStation project has ended.

=== PlayStation Plus ===
PlayStation Plus, a subscription-based service on the PlayStation Network, complements the standard PSN services. It enables an auto-download feature for game patches and system software updates. Subscribers gain early or exclusive access to some betas, game demos, premium downloadable content (such as full game trials of retail games like Infamous, and LittleBigPlanet) and other PlayStation Store items, as well as a free subscription to Qore. Other downloadable items include PlayStation Store discounts and free PlayStation Network games, PS one Classics, PlayStation Minis, themes and avatars. It offers a 14-day free trial.

=== PlayStation Blog ===
PlayStation Blog (stylized as PlayStation.Blog) is an online PlayStation-focused gaming blog, part of the PlayStation Network. It was launched on June 11, 2007 and has featured in numerous interviews with third-party companies such as Square Enix. It features posts from high-ranking Sony Interactive Entertainment executives. A sub-site of the blog called PlayStation Blog Share was launched on March 17, 2010, and allowed readers of the blog as well as users of the PlayStation Blog to submit ideas to the PlayStation team about anything PlayStation-related and vote on the ideas of other submissions. Sony Computer Entertainment Europe launched a European sub-outlet, PlayStation Blog Europe, on May 28, 2009, to replace the "semi-official" site Three Speech that shut down on April 17. This branch was merged into the main outlet on June 1, 2020.

=== PlayStation App ===
The PlayStation App is an application that was released on January 11, 2011, in several European countries for iOS (version 4 and above) and for Android (version 1.6 and above), and has been installed more than 3.6 million times as of March 2, 2014. It allows users to view their trophies, see which of their PSN friends are online and read up to date information about PlayStation. It does not feature any gaming functionality.

=== PlayStation Mobile ===
The PlayStation Mobile (formerly PlayStation Suite) was a software framework that was used to provide downloadable PlayStation content to devices running Android 2.3 and above as well as the PlayStation Vita. As such, it was a cross-platform and cross-device framework, which Sony dubbed "hardware-neutral". It was set to release before the end of calendar year 2011, and released on October 3, 2012. In addition, Android devices that had the ability to playback PlayStation Suite content smoothly was certified with the PlayStation Certified certification. The PlayStation Mobile program did not gain much traction, and after depreciating Android support was discontinued after 2015.

=== PlayStation Now ===
PlayStation Now (PS Now) was a Gaikai-based video game streaming service used to provide PlayStation gaming content to PlayStation 3 (PS3), PlayStation 4 (PS4), PlayStation 5 (PS5), PlayStation Vita, PlayStation TV and BRAVIA televisions. The service allowed users to pay for access to a selection of original PlayStation 3 titles on either a per-game basis or via a subscription. PlayStation Now was announced on January 7, 2014, at the 2014 Consumer Electronic Show. At CES, Sony presented demos of The Last of Us, God of War: Ascension, Puppeteer and Beyond: Two Souls, playable through PS Now on Bravia TVs and PlayStation Vitas. PlayStation Now was launched in Open Beta in the United States and Canada on PS4 on July 31, 2014, on PS3 on September 18, 2014, on PS Vita and PS TV on October 14, 2014, with support for select 2014 Bravia TVs coming later in the year. It was merged into PlayStation Plus in May and June 2022, and is no longer available as a standalone subscription.

=== Online social networking services ===
==== PlayStation Home ====
PlayStation Home was a community-based social gaming networking service for the PlayStation 3 on the PlayStation Network (PSN). It was available directly from the PlayStation 3 XrossMediaBar. Membership is free and only requires a PSN account. Home has been in development since early 2005 and started an open public beta test on December 11, 2008. Home allows users to create a custom avatar, which can be made to suit the user's preference. Users can decorate their avatar's personal apartment ("HomeSpace") with default, bought, or won items. They can travel throughout the Home world (except across regions), which is constantly updated by Sony and partners. Each part of the world is known as a space. Public spaces can just be for display, fun, or for meeting people. Home features many mini-games which can be single player or multiplayer. Users can shop for new items to express themselves more through their avatars or HomeSpace. Home features video screens in many places for advertising, but the main video content is shown at the theatre for entertainment. Home plays host to a variety of special events which range from prize-giving events to entertaining events. Users can also use Home to connect with friends and customize content. Xi, a once notable feature of Home, is the world's first console based Alternate Reality Game that took place in secret areas in Home and was created by nDreams.

==== Room for PlayStation Portable ====
"Room" (officially spelled as R∞M with capital letters and the infinity symbol in place of the "oo") was being beta tested in Japan from October 2009 to April 2010. Development of Room was halted on April 15, 2010, due to negative feedback from the community. Announced at TGS 2009, it was supposed to be a similar service to the PlayStation Home and was being developed for the PSP. Launching directly from the PlayStation Network section of the XMB was also to be enabled. Just like in Home, PSP owners would have been able to invite other PSP owners into their rooms to "enjoy real time communication." A closed beta test had begun in Q4 2009 in Japan.

=== Others ===
In 2015, Sony launched PlayStation Gear, an online merchandise and apparel store. Jason Schreier of Bloomberg News reported in December 2021 that Sony was working to create a new subscription service, code-named Spartacus, intended as a competitor to the Xbox Game Pass service by Microsoft, with plans to release in the second quarter of 2022. The multi-tiered service would incorporate PlayStation Plus, PlayStation Now, and additional features, such as the most-expensive tier that would give players access to PlayStation 1, 2, and 3 games.

== Software ==
=== XrossMediaBar ===
The XrossMediaBar, originally used on the PSX, is a graphical user interface used for the PlayStation 3 and PlayStation Portable, as well as a variety of other Sony devices. The interface features icons that are spread horizontally across the screen. Navigation moves the icons instead of a cursor. These icons are used as categories to organize the options available to the user. When an icon is selected on the horizontal bar, several more appear vertically, above and below it (selectable by the up and down directions on a directional pad). The XMB can also be accessed in-game albeit with restrictions, it allows players to access certain areas of the XMB menu from within the game and is only available for the PlayStation 3. Although the capacity to play users' own music in-game was added with this update, the feature is dependent on game developers who must either enable the feature in their games or update existing games.

=== LiveArea ===
LiveArea, designed to be used on the PlayStation Vita, is a graphical user interface set to incorporate various social networking features via the PlayStation Network. It has been designed specifically as a touchscreen user interface for users.

=== Linux operating systems ===
==== Linux for PlayStation 2 ====
In 2002, Sony released the first useful and fully functioning operating system for a video game console, after the Net Yaroze experiment for the original PlayStation. The kit, which included an internal hard disk drive and the necessary software tools, turned the PlayStation 2 into a full-fledged computer system running Linux. Users can utilize a network adapter to connect the PlayStation 2 to the internet, a monitor cable adaptor to connect the PlayStation 2 to computer monitors as well as a USB Keyboard and Mouse which can be used to control Linux on the PlayStation 2.

==== Linux for PlayStation 3 ====
The PlayStation 3 (excluding PlayStation 3 Slim) also supports running Linux OS on firmware versions before 3.21 without the need to buy additional hardware. Yellow Dog Linux provides an official distribution that can be downloaded, and other distributions such as Fedora, Gentoo and Ubuntu have been successfully installed and operated on the console. The use of Linux on the PlayStation 3 allowed users to access 6 of the 7 Synergistic Processing Elements; Sony implemented a hypervisor restricting access to the RSX. The feature to install a second operating system on a PlayStation 3 was removed in a firmware update released in 2010.

== Magazines ==
Historically, the PlayStation brand was supported by a global network of officially licensed print publications that operated in close cooperation with Sony. These magazines served as primary information hubs for the gaming community, featuring industry news, upcoming game previews, exclusive developer interviews, and comprehensive reviews, along with gameplay strategies and cheat codes. They also frequently included promotional demo discs for upcoming PlayStation games. Over time, changing media consumption habits led to the cessation of these print titles. Readers increasingly migrated to specialized video game news websites for immediate coverage, while Sony simultaneously shifted its marketing and community engagement to digital platforms like the PlayStation Blog and State of Play broadcasts. By the early 2020s, all official PlayStation print publications had ceased operations.

The brand's history features numerous defunct publications. In the United Kingdom, the original Official UK PlayStation Magazine covered the first-generation console from 1995 to 2004, while the Official UK PlayStation 2 Magazine focused on its successor from 2000 until its 100th and final issue in July 2008. PlayStation Official Magazine – UK and PlayStation Official Magazine – Australia both concluded publication in 2021 after publisher Future plc chose not to renew the official licensing agreement with Sony. Following the closure of these official publications, Future plc launched Play Magazine (stylized as PLAY) as an independent, unofficial successor to continue coverage of PlayStation consoles, which was distributed in both the United Kingdom and Australia (as PLAY Australia) until the magazine itself ceased publication in late 2024. Sony also expanded coverage to the Irish market with the Official PlayStation Magazine – Ireland in 2000, which ran until its closure in 2001.

Regional variations were established across other global markets, featuring dedicated European editions such as France's PlayStation Le Magazine Officiel and PlayStation 2 Le Magazine Officiel, Germany's Das Offizielle PlayStation Magazin and Das Offizielle PlayStation 2 Magazin, Italy's PlayStation Magazine Ufficiale and PlayStation 2 Magazine Ufficiale, Spain's PlayStation Revista Oficial - España and PlayStation 2 Revista Oficial - España, Portugal's Revista Oficial Playstation – Edição Portuguesa and PlayStation 2 Revista Oficial - Portugal, the Netherlands and Belgium's Officieel PlayStation Magazine – Benelux, the Netherlands Officieel PlayStation Magazine and PlayStation 2 Officieel Nederlandstalig Magazine, Czechia's Oficiální Český PlayStation magazín and PlayStation 2 Oficiální Magazín - CZ, Poland's Oficjalny Polski PlayStation Magazyn and PlayStation 2 Oficjalny Polski Magazyn, Hungary's Hivatalos Magyar PlayStation Magazin, Bulgaria's PlayStation Ofitsialnoto Bŭlgarsko Izdanie, Greece's Official PlayStation Magazine – GR and PlayStation 2 Official Magazine - GR, Denmark's Officielt Dansk PlayStation Magasin and PlayStation 2 Officielt Dansk Magasin, Norway's Offisielt Norsk PlayStation Magasin and PlayStation 2 Offisielt Norsk Magasin, Sweden's Svenska PlayStationmagasinet, Finland's Virallinen PlayStation-lehti, Turkey's PlayStation Official Magazine - TR and Resmi PlayStation 2 Dergisi, and Russia's Official PlayStation Magazine Rossiya and PlayStation 2 Official Magazine Rossiya.

Beyond Europe, localized official editions were established in major console markets, Brazil's Playstation Revista Oficial - Brasil concluded its 300-issue run in January 2023. Japan's prominent, long-running, and officially licensed publication Dengeki PlayStation ceased regular print operations in March 2020, after 25 years of publication and 686 issues.

The Official U.S. PlayStation Magazine operated for 112 issues between 1997 and 2007. Following its discontinuation, Sony officially licensed the independent magazine PSM: 100% Independent PlayStation Magazine, which rebranded as PlayStation: The Official Magazine (US) in late 2007 and published its final issue in December 2012.

PlayStation Underground was a non-traditional magazine that Sony Computer Entertainment America produced and published between Spring 1997 to Spring 2001 in the United States. Subscribers received two PlayStation CDs, along with a booklet and colorful packaging every quarter. The CDs contained interviews, cheats, programmers moves, game demos and one-of-a-kind Memory Card saves. Several issues showed how a game was created from basic design to final product. Since the CDs could only be run on a PlayStation, it proved a useful marketing tool which spawned a line of PlayStation Underground JamPacks Demo CDs and which contained highlights from recent issues of PlayStation Underground, along with seemingly as many game demos that could be packed on a single CD. Unlike PlayStation Underground these were available in most stores for $4.95, were published twice a year in Summer and Winter and usually spotlighted newly released or coming soon games. By 2001, Sony had decided to phase out Underground to focus on the JamPacks with the release of the PlayStation 2. PlayStation Underground CDs are mainly in the hands of collectors these days.

== Marketing ==
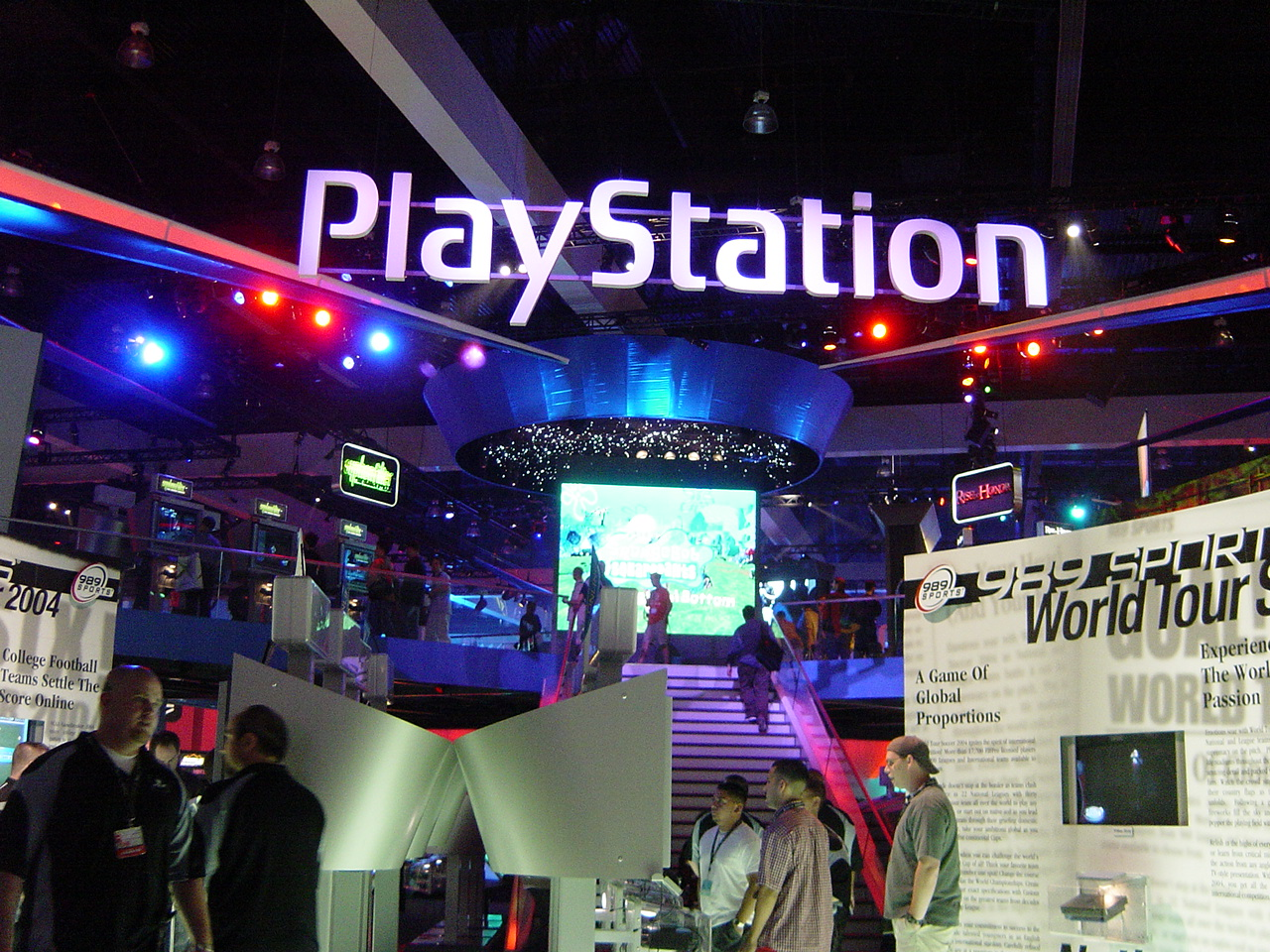
Promotion of the PlayStation at the Electronic Entertainment Expo 2003

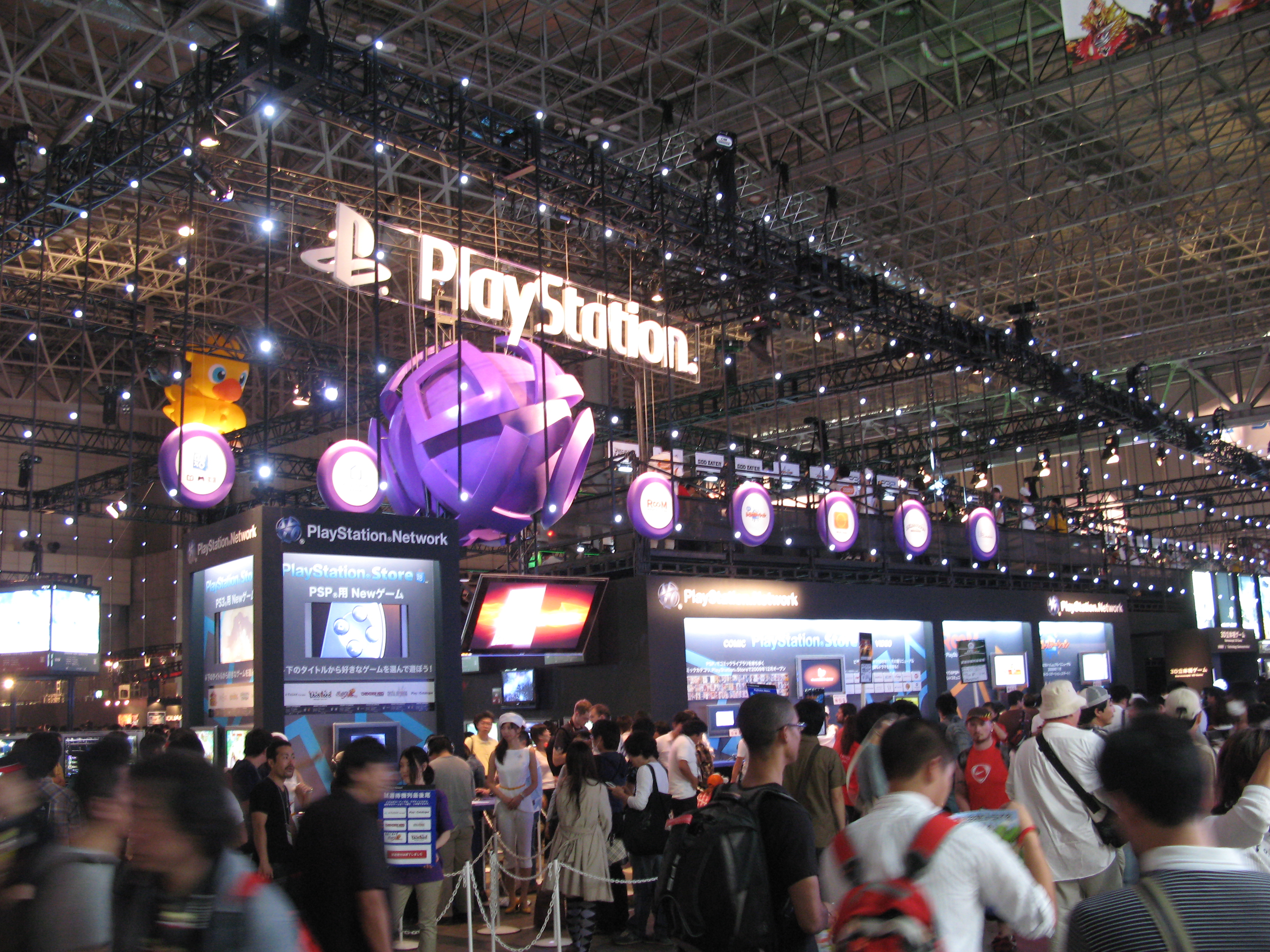
PlayStation booth at the Tokyo Game Show 2009

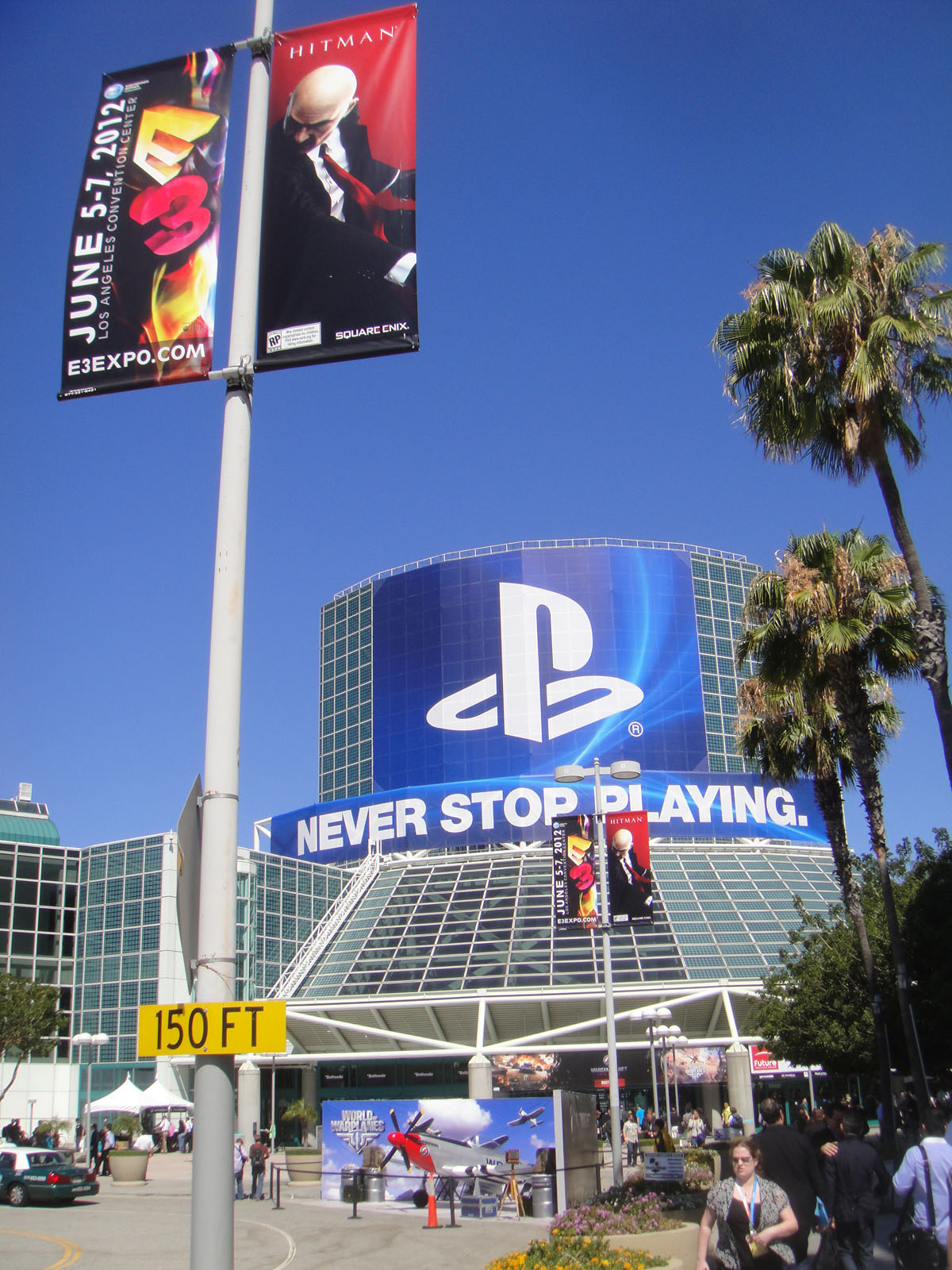
PlayStation banner at the Electronic Entertainment Expo 2012

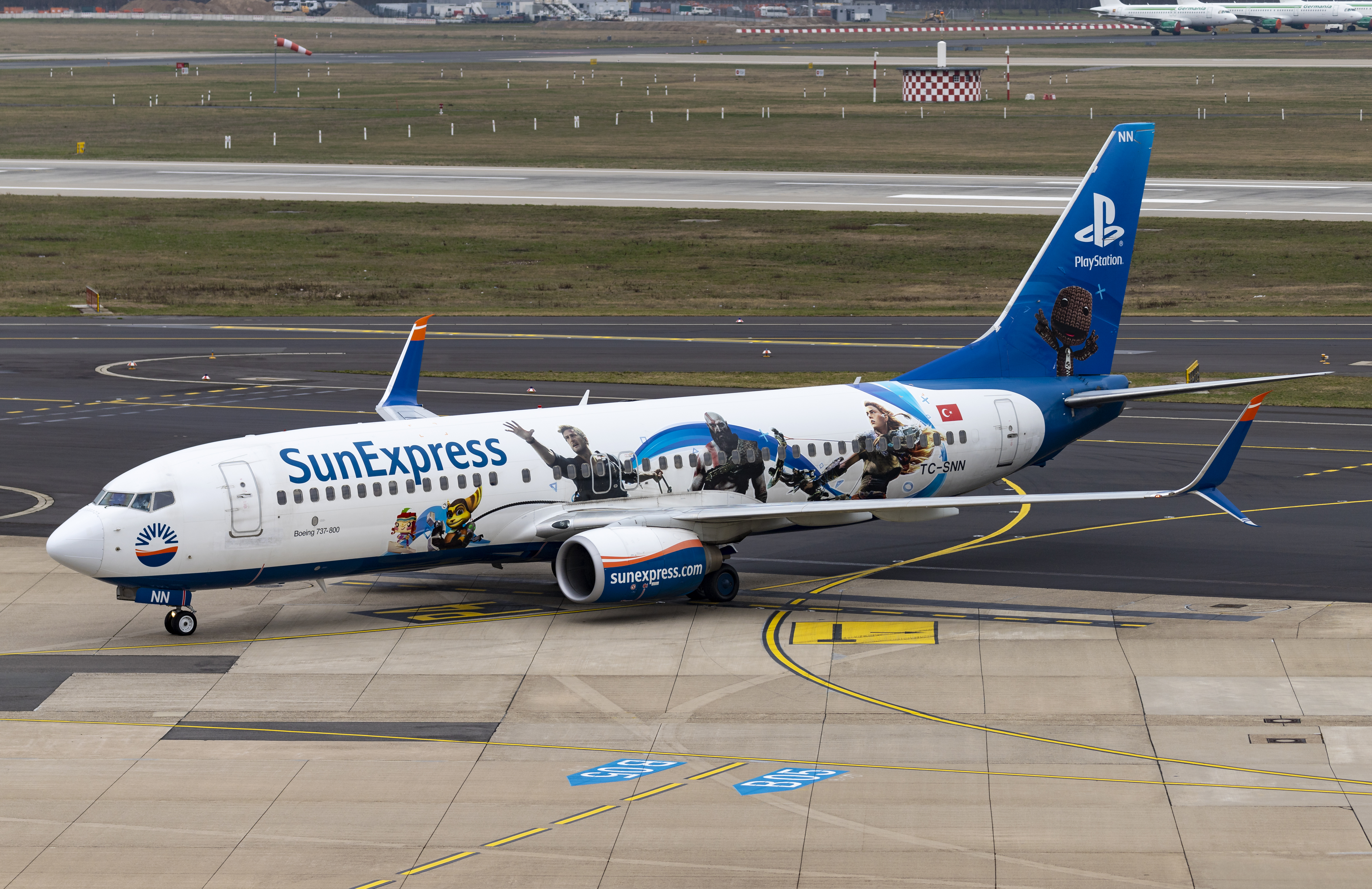
PlayStation-themed livery at the Boeing 737

=== Slogans ===
Advertising slogans used for each PlayStation console iteration:

PlayStation

- "eNoS Lives" (The first letter 'E' was printed in red to denote the word, ready. Enos stood for Ready, Ninth of September) (US Commercials)
- "U R Not e" (The letter 'E' was printed in red to denote the word, ready, as in You Are Not Ready)
- "Do Not Underestimate The Power of PlayStation." (From the S.A.P.S. – Society Against PlayStation — series of adverts)

PS one

- "Wherever, Whenever, Forever."

PlayStation 2

- "The Beginning."
- "Live In Yur Wrld, Ply In urs." (The PlayStation face button icons were used to denote certain letters: Live In Your World, Play In Ours)
- "(Welcome to the) Third Place."
- "Fun, Anyone?"
- "The ultimate just got better – PlayStation 9 – teleport yours today."

PlayStation Portable

- "PSP Hellz Yeah" (PSP-1000 Series)
- "Dude, Get Your Own..." (PSP-2000 Series)
- "Everywhere Just Got Better" (PSP-3000 Series and PSPgo)
- "It's GO Time" (PSPgo)
- "Your Whole World In Your Hands" (UK & Europe Territories)
- "Step Your Game Up" (US Territory, PSP-3000 Series and PSPgo)

PlayStation 3

- "The Wait Is Over"
- "Welcome Chang3" (the number three is used to denote an 'e' and was printed in red)
- "This is Living."
- "Play B3yond" (the number three is used to denote an 'e' and was printed in red)
- "It Only Does Everything" (US Commercials) (PS3 Slim)
- "The Game Is Just The Start. Start PS3." (EU countries)
- "Long Live Play" (PS3 Slim)
- "Never Stop Playing" (PS3 Slim)
- "Greatness Awaits" (PS3 SuperSlim)

PlayStation Move

- "This Changes Everything"
- "Move Into The Action"

PlayStation Network

- "Download, Play, Connect."

PlayStation Vita

- "Never Stop Playing."
- "The World is in Play." (EU only)

PlayStation 4

- "See the Future"
- "Push the boundaries of Play"
- "Greatness Awaits"
- "This is 4 the Players"
- "Where the Greatest Play"

PlayStation 5

- "Play Has No Limits"
- "It Happens on PlayStation 5"

=== Notable advertising campaigns ===
==== It Only Does Everything ====
The most notable of recent PlayStation commercials is the series of "It Only Does Everything" commercials featuring a fictional character called Kevin Butler who is a vice president at PlayStation. These commercials usually advertise the PlayStation 3 and its games through a series of comedic answers to "Dear PlayStation" queries. These commercials garnered popularity among gamers, though its debut commercial received criticism from the Nigerian government due to a reference to the common 419 scams originating in Nigeria. Sony issued an apology and a new version of the advert with the offending line changed was produced.

A spin-off of the campaign has been created for the PlayStation Portable which features similar campaign commercials called the "Step Your Game Up" campaign featuring a fictional teenage character named Marcus Rivers acting similarly to Kevin Butler but answering the "Dear PlayStation" queries about the PSP.

==== Netherlands Ceramic White PSP Commercials ====
In July 2006, an advertising campaign in the Netherlands was released in which a white model dressed entirely in white and a black model dressed entirely in black was used to compare Sony's new Ceramic White PSP and the original Piano Black PSP. This series of ads depicted both models fighting with each other and drew criticism from the media for being racist, though Sony maintains that the ad did not feature any racist message.

==== All I want for Xmas is a PSP ====
In November 2006, a marketing company employed by Sony's American division created a website entitled "All I want for Xmas is a PSP", designed to promote the PSP virally. The site contained a blog which was purportedly written by "Charlie", a teenage boy attempting to get his friend Jeremy's parents to buy him a PSP, and providing a "music video" of either Charlie or Jeremy "rapping" about the PSP. Visitors to the website quickly recognized that the domain name was registered to a marketing company, exposing the campaign on sites such as YouTube and digg. Sony was forced to admit that the site was in fact a marketing campaign and in an interview with next-gen.biz, Sony admitted that the idea was "poorly executed".

=== Sponsorship ===
Between 1999 and 2007 and 2009 to 2010, PlayStation was the main kit sponsor of French Ligue 1 club AJ Auxerre and Olympique Lyonnais, respectively.

PlayStation had been an official sponsor of WWE pay-per-view events in the past, including In Your House: Buried Alive, WrestleMania 13, Badd Blood: In Your House and InVasion, while the PlayStation 2 had sponsored 3 consecutive Royal Rumble events (2003–2005), Armageddon 2004, and No Mercy 2005.

Between 2016 and 2022, PlayStation was the sponsor of the Fiesta Bowl.

== Reception ==
In 2005, Australian newspaper The Age wrote an article about the PlayStation brand. Among the numerous interviews conducted with various people in the industry was an interview with Jeffrey Brand, associate professor in communication and media at Bond University who said, "PlayStation re-ignited our imagination with video games". Game designer Yoshiki Okamoto called the brand "revolutionary — PlayStation has changed gaming, distribution, sales, image and more", while Evan Wells of Naughty Dog said "PlayStation is responsible for making playing games cool."

In 2009, ViTrue, Inc. listed the PlayStation brand as number 13 on their "The Vitrue 100: Top Social Brands of 2009". The ranking was based on various aspects mainly dealing with popular social media sites in aspects such as Social Networking, Video Sharing, Photo Sharing and Blogs.

In 2010, Gizmodo stated that the PlayStation brand was one of the last Sony products to completely stand apart from its competitors, stating that "If you ask the average person on the street what their favorite Sony product is, more often than not you'll hear PlayStation". As of April 2012, the PlayStation brand is the "most followed" brand on social networking site, Facebook, with over 22 million fans and followers in total which is more than any other brand in the entertainment industry. A study by Greenlight's Entertainment Retail has also shown that the PlayStation brand is the most interactive making 634 posts and tweets on social networking sites Facebook and Twitter.

In July 2014, Sony boasted in a company release video that the PlayStation 3, PlayStation 4 and PlayStation Vita sold a combined total of 100 million units. It was announced at Tokyo Game Show on September 1, 2014, that PlayStation home game consoles claim 78% market share of all home consoles in Japan.

As of 2015, PlayStation is the best-selling home console brand worldwide.

== See also ==
- Xbox
- Nintendo
- Sega
- Atari
- SNK
