= PlayStation 2 =

Home video game console by Sony

- Left: Original PlayStation 2 (2000); Center: Slim PlayStation 2 (2004); Right: Slim PlayStation 2 (2007)
- Also known as: PS2
- Developer: Sony Computer Entertainment
- Manufacturer: Sony Corporation; Foxconn
- Product family: PlayStation
- Type: Home video game console
- Generation: Sixth
- Released: 4 March 2000: PlayStation 2; JP: 4 March 2000; NA: 26 October 2000; EU: 24 November 2000; AU/ZA: 30 November 2000; HK: 13 December 2001; TW: 24 January 2002; KR: 22 February 2002; RUS: 7 November 2002; IND: 13 August 2003; CHN: 1 January 2004 PlayStation 2 Slimline; EU: 29 October 2004; JP: 3 November 2004; NA: 25 November 2004; AU: 2 December 2004; IND: 10 September 2008; BRA: 15 October 2009
- Introductory price: ¥39,800 (equivalent to ¥44,330 in 2024); US$299 (equivalent to $560 in 2025); £299 (equivalent to £570 in 2025)
- Discontinued: JP: 28 December 2012; WW: 4 January 2013
- Units shipped: 160 million
- Media: DVD, CD
- CPU: Emotion Engine @ 294.912 MHz
- Memory: 32 MB RAM, 4 MB Video RAM
- Storage: 40 GB hard drive (optional)
- Removable storage: 8 MB PS2 memory card; 128 KB PS1 memory card; PocketStation
- Display: 240p, 288p, 480p, 480i, 576i, 1080i
- Graphics: Graphics Synthesizer @ 150 MHz
- Sound: Audio output formats: AV Multi: (2ch), (4ch), (5.1ch); Analog stereo; Dolby Pro Logic / Pro Logic II (Analog) Optical audio: (2ch), (4ch), (5.1ch); Dolby Digital (video only); Dolby Pro Logic / Pro Logic II (Digital); DTS (video only); DTS Interactive; Linear PCM (44.1 kHz, 48 kHz)
- Controller input: DualShock 2 (Note: Also backwards compatible with original PlayStation controller, Dual Analog and original DualShock.); EyeToy; DVD Remote Control
- Connectivity: List: Audio/video output; AV Multi port (with stereo audio); Component; Composite; D‑Terminal; SCART/JP21; S‑Video; VGA (Note: Progressive scan capable software only.); Optical audio Other; Ethernet/modem (early models require adaptor); 2 × USB 1.1; USB 2.0; i.LINK (early models); IR receiver (later models and Slim models)
- Online services: Developer-run servers
- Dimensions: Original: 3.1 × 11.9 × 7.2 in (78.7 × 302.3 × 182.9 mm)
- Weight: Original: 4.85 lb (2.2 kg); Slim: 1.98 lb (0.9 kg)
- Best-selling game: Grand Theft Auto: San Andreas (17.33 million) (list)
- Backward compatibility: PlayStation
- Predecessor: PlayStation
- Successor: PlayStation 3
- Related: PSX
- Website: us.playstation.com/consoles.aspx?id=2 at the Wayback Machine (archived 2005-02-04)

The PlayStation 2 (PS2) is a home video game console developed by Sony Computer Entertainment. It was first released in Japan on March 4, 2000, in North America on October 26, in Europe on November 24, in Australia on November 30, and other regions thereafter. It is the successor to the original PlayStation as well as the second installment in the PlayStation brand of consoles. As a sixth-generation console, it competed primarily against Nintendo's GameCube, Sega's Dreamcast, and Microsoft's Xbox.

Announced in 1998, Sony began developing the console after the immense success of its predecessor. In addition to serving as a game console, it featured a built-in DVD drive. Full backward compatibility with original PlayStation games and accessories gave it access to a vast launch library, far surpassing those of its competitors. The console's hardware was also notable for its custom-built Emotion Engine processor, co-developed with Toshiba, which was promoted as being more powerful than most personal computers of the era.

The PlayStation 2 remains the best-selling video game console of all time, having sold 160 million units worldwide—nearly triple the combined sales of competing sixth-generation consoles. It received widespread critical acclaim and amassed a global library of over 4,000 game titles, with 1.54 billion copies sold. In 2004 Sony released a smaller, lighter PS2 model officially known as the "Slimline". Even after the release of its successor, the PlayStation 3, on 11 November 2006, it remained in production and continued to receive new game releases for several years with the last game for the system Pro Evolution Soccer 2014 being released exclusively in Europe on 8 November 2013. The console was discontinued on 4 January 2013, giving it one of the longest lifespans in video game history.

== History ==
=== Background ===
Released in 1994, the original PlayStation proved to be a phenomenal worldwide success and signalled Sony's rise to power in the video game industry. Its launch elicited critical acclaim and strong sales; it eventually became the first computer entertainment platform to ship over 100 million units. The PlayStation enjoyed particular success outside Japan in part due to Sony's refined development kits, large-scale advertising campaigns, and strong third-party developer support. By the late 1990s, Sony had dethroned established rivals Sega and Nintendo in the global video game market. Sega, spurred on by their declining market share and significant financial losses, launched the Dreamcast in 1998 as a last-ditch attempt to stay in the industry. Fuelled by a large marketing campaign, it sold over 500,000 units within two weeks.

=== Development ===
Though Sony has kept details of the PlayStation 2's development secret, Ken Kutaragi, "the Father of the PlayStation", reportedly began working on a second console around the time of the original PlayStation's launch in late 1994. At some point during development, employees from Argonaut Games, under contract for semiconductor manufacturer LSI Logic Corporation, were instructed to design a rendering chip for Sony's upcoming console. Jez San, founder of Argonaut, recalled that his team had no direct contact with Sony during the development process. Unbeknownst to him, Sony was designing their own chip in-house and had instructed other companies to design rendering chips merely to diversify their options.

By early 1997, the press was reporting that a new PlayStation was being developed and would have backward-compatibility with the original PlayStation, a built-in DVD player, and Internet connectivity. However, Sony continued to officially deny that a successor was being developed. Chris Deering, then-president of Sony Computer Entertainment Europe (SCEE) recalled that there was a degree of trepidation among Sony leaders to produce a console which would recapture or exceed the success of its predecessor. As such, Sony aimed for a consecutive market success, noting that neither Nintendo nor Sega had achieved back-to-back console victories. Deering compared the goal to winning "two gold medals in two back-to-back Olympics".

Sony officially revealed the first details of the PlayStation 2 on March 2, 1999, confirming in a press release that its processor would ensure full backwards compatibility with original PlayStation software, significantly boosted performance, four-fold increase in data transfer rates, and a 20-times faster serial interface. Kutaragi affirmed that the new console would allow video games to convey "unprecedented emotions". Indeed, Sony estimated the PlayStation 2 could render 7.5 million to 16 million polygons per second, whereas contemporary independent estimates ranged from 3 million to 20 million, compared to Sega's estimates of more than 3 million to 6 million for the rival Dreamcast. Later in the year, Nintendo announced their next console, the GameCube, and Microsoft began development of their own console, the Xbox.

Rumours soon emerged suggesting that, despite its technical capabilities, the PlayStation 2 was notably difficult to develop for. Capcom designer Shinji Mikami, known for creating the Resident Evil and Dino Crisis franchises, criticised the lack of adequate development tools provided by Sony. Having worked on titles for multiple fifth-generation platforms, Mikami described the PlayStation 2 as the most challenging system he had encountered. Likewise, Konami's Hideo Kojima expressed disappointment with the console's power, feeling it had not met his expectations.

"PlayStation 2's real-time graphics have no limitations. That's why I chose the colour black as it represents the infinity of the universe. The blue represents the intelligence and life spouting up."

— Teiyu Goto reflecting on the PlayStation 2's aesthetics

The PlayStation 2 was officially unveiled at the Tokyo Game Show on September 20, 1999, in the presence of around 1,500 journalists. A press release issued the same day described the hardware as featuring "the world's fastest graphics rendering processor", capable of producing "movie-quality 3D graphics in real time". One of the event's most symbolic moments came when Sony president Norio Ohga expressed pride in formally associating the Sony name with the PlayStation brand—a notable reversal from the company's cautious stance during the development of the original console, when concerns about entering the video game industry had led executives to distance the corporate brand from the project. By this point, the PlayStation had sold over 50 million units worldwide and become one of Sony's most profitable divisions, accounting for roughly a quarter of their operating income. Shortly after its unveiling, Sony announced a major restructuring that included workforce reductions and a shift in focus towards PlayStation as a core part of the company's future. Kutaragi, once considered a maverick for championing the original PlayStation, remarked: "We're just going to be forced to educate the Sony Corporation a bit".

On April 1, 1999, Sony and Toshiba established a joint venture in Nagasaki Prefecture to manufacture the PlayStation 2's central processor, known as the Emotion Engine. Sony Computer Entertainment (SCE) held a 49 per cent stake in the new company, which was formed to ensure a steady supply of the chip and avoid production issues similar to those faced by rivals such as Sega and NEC. The Emotion Engine was central to Kutaragi's vision for the console. Designed specifically for gaming, it featured strong floating-point performance and could deliver 6.2 gigaflops at 300 MHz—twice the speed of the leading PC processors at the time. Kutaragi envisioned the chip as enabling more lifelike and emotionally resonant gameplay. According to then-Worldwide Studios head Phil Harrison, the processor's architecture was initially met with scepticism when presented at a chip design conference, with some experts doubting it could be manufactured at scale. Sony ultimately invested over $1 billion in production during the console's first two years. The ultimate success of the Emotion Engine helped elevate SCE's profile from a game developer to a serious player in semiconductor design.

Incorporating a DVD player in the console proved to be a pivotal decision. While Sony presented it primarily as a gaming device, the DVD functionality would prove influential in expanding its appeal. Ray Maguire, then-managing director of SCE UK, later said that although the DVD feature was acknowledged in marketing, the focus remained on games. In contrast, Deering noted that in regions such as Southern Europe, where gaming was less prevalent, the DVD capability was to be promoted more heavily. This strategy proved successful in increasing console penetration in markets like Spain, where the PS2 significantly expanded the installed base of video game hardware. The decision to include DVD-Video support was the result of Kutaragi witnessing a demonstration for the Nuon, an enhancement chip developed by VM Labs that added video game support to commercial DVD players. The original PlayStation's success had elevated Kutaragi's stature within Sony to the extent that he could overrule the company's concerns over cannibalizing sales of their standalone DVD players.

=== Launch ===
==== Japan ====
Sony launched the PlayStation 2 in Japan on March 4, 2000, at a price of ¥39,800. Reported scenes of "hysteria" contrasted with the relatively subdued launch of the original PlayStation in 1994. More than 10,000 people queued across Tokyo on its launch day, some of whom had started waiting four days earlier. Demand was exceptionally high, with all one million launch units selling out over the course of the first weekend. A black market had quickly opened up in Akihabara, with most consoles on eBay selling in excess of $2000 each. One Japanese man committed suicide after failing to purchase one. Within five days, a million PlayStation 2 had been sold. Despite very strong hardware sales, the Japanese launch was not without issues. Software sales were initially low, with reports suggesting that many consumers purchased the console primarily for its DVD playback capabilities. Additionally, early complaints about faulty memory cards contributed to a dip in Sony's stock price on the Tokyo Stock Exchange in the days following the release.

We were awfully unprepared [...] because of the fast transition between PS1 and PS2, we had no idea how the industry manages these things.

— Shuhei Yoshida, speaking at a conference in 2018.

Former Worldwide Studios president Shuhei Yoshida acknowledged that Sony had been "awfully unprepared" for the transition from the original PlayStation, noting the company's limited experience in managing generational console launches. Due to a lack of launch software, much of the early consumer interest centered on the console's ability to play DVDs. According to Yoshida, in Japan, the best-selling title during the launch period was not a game, but a DVD of The Matrix (1999). He remarked that while standalone DVD players were still expensive at the time, the PlayStation 2 offered comparable functionality at a significantly lower price point, contributing to its immediate commercial success. The PlayStation 2 launched with eleven "underwhelming" titles, including Ridge Racer V, Tekken Tag Tournament, and Street Fighter EX3. By March 31, 2000, the PlayStation 2 had sold its entire inventory of 1.4 million units in Japan.

==== North America ====
The United States launch on October 26, 2000, received a mixed reception. Sony reduced their initial shipment from one million units to approximately 500,000 due to supply constraints and manufacturing issues with a new, smaller version of the Graphics Synthesizer chip, leading to widespread shortages. This sparked rumors of intentional stock manipulation to drive hype, especially as small supplies remained available in Japan. Retailers, who had taken pre-orders based on the higher estimates, were forced to cancel many reservations. Despite the frustration, the scarcity created a media frenzy, with widespread coverage of long queues and eager buyers camping outside stores. Technology journalist, analyst and blogger Michael Gartenberg remarked that "you could not get a PlayStation 2 in the US in that first holiday season", and felt that its demand could have harmed Sony's image when consumers were looking to purchase, but ultimately could not.

However, the launch was supported by a broader selection of games compared to Japan. Electronic Arts (EA) sold 40,000 copies of Madden NFL 2001 prior to the console's release, and Rockstar Games saw early success with Midnight Club: Street Racing (2000) and Smuggler's Run (2000). Despite some criticism of the launch itself, Rockstar's Sam Houser remarked that it marked the "beginning of a new era" for the video game industry. American sales of the console generated $250 million on the first day, beating the $97 million made on the first day of the Dreamcast. Sony's strategy of shipping approximately 100,000 PlayStation 2 units per week to the American market did little to ease consumer frustration. While the console was readily available in Japan, it remained largely sold out in the United States until March 2001 due to manufacturing delays.

==== Europe ====
The PlayStation 2 had a yet more troubled launch in the United Kingdom and rest of Europe on November 24, 2000. The BBC's consumer investigative journalism programme Watchdog criticized the console's £299 price as part of a "Rip-off Britain" segment. Additionally, some media outlets speculated that Sony had deliberately limited supply to create artificial demand. This perception was intensified by the decision to allocate only 80,000 preorders to the European market, despite Sony having previously identified Europe as its largest PlayStation territory, with 28 million original PlayStation units sold—compared to 27 million in North America and 17 million in Japan. Particularly serious were complaints about faults with the new consoles, many of which purportedly failed to work on Christmas Day.

The European launch of the PlayStation 2 was marked by stock shortages, which led to an unusual scene on release night as journalists searched unsuccessfully for the kind of large-scale consumer queues seen in Japan and the United States. Early resale attempts online saw ambitious asking prices of up to £1,500, though most units ultimately sold for closer to £500. Post-launch criticism emerged online, with some gaming outlets focusing on the console's lack of anti-aliasing and developers voicing frustration over the system's programming complexity. At the time, Phil Harrison dismissed the backlash as indicative of the "worldwide cultural significance" of the console's arrival.

=== Market domination ===
Despite its problematic launch, the PlayStation 2 was an immediate financial and competitive triumph. Its success at the end of 2000 compounded Sega's serious financial issues; having sold 6.5 million Dreamcast consoles over a period of 22 months, Sony managed to ship 10 million PlayStation 2 units in under 15 months, with sales continuing to accelerate. As the PlayStation 2 increasingly dominated the market, and with Nintendo and Microsoft preparing to enter with new consoles, Sega chairman Isao Okawa made the decision to exit the hardware business. The Dreamcast was discontinued on March 31, 2001. On the same day, Sony announced that over 10.6 million units had been sold worldwide.

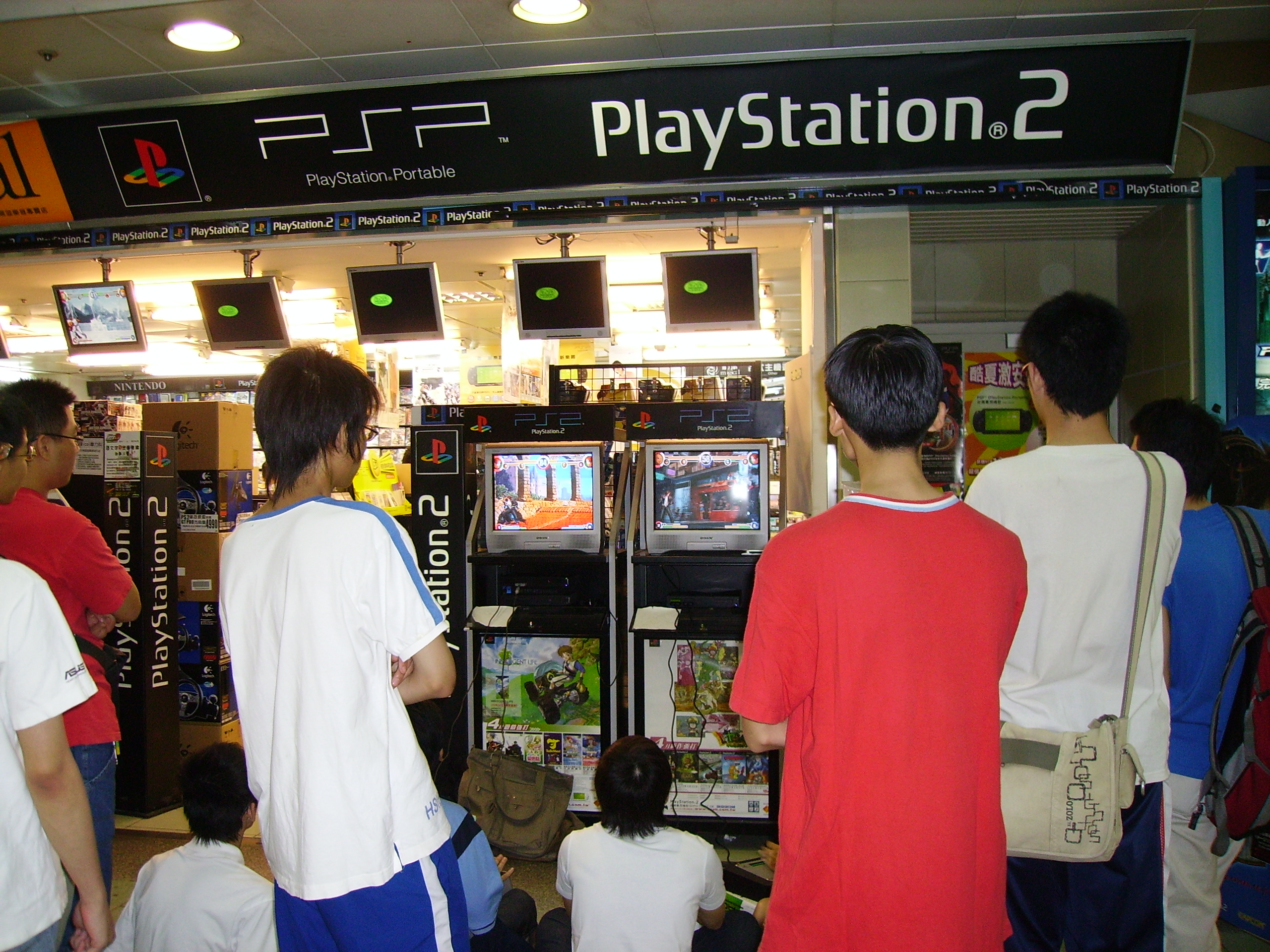
A PlayStation 2 display in Taipei, Republic of China (Taiwan)

Sony soon faced a new challenge from Microsoft's entry into the gaming sector with their release of the Xbox in November 2001. Internally, Sony executives recognized the scale of the threat, aware that Microsoft held significantly greater financial resources. Whilst the Japanese team were less alarmed, SCEE's Chris Deering anticipated intense competition and took a cautious approach. However, Microsoft's US-centric strategy resulted in the Xbox struggling to gain traction outside North America, despite hiring talented staff. Sony's emphasis on building strong relationships with third-party publishers, and attractive incentives such as reduced platform fees, marketing support, and access to advanced development kits, secured key exclusives that helped maintain their market lead. This initiative was heavily emphasized by Ken Kutaragi, who advocated for a diverse ecosystem of software support. He advised that Sony should not dominate more than a third of its own software market to avoid alienating third-party developers.

By 2001, Sony had established a commanding lead in the gaming market, bolstered by the break-out success of Rockstar's Grand Theft Auto III and Konami's Metal Gear Solid 2: Sons of Liberty. The former game's open world design captured the attention of a broad audience and marked a turning point in the PlayStation 2's momentum. The console's growing library reflected the same wide-ranging appeal that had defined the original PlayStation, offering something for "every type" of consumer. Sony also positioned itself at the forefront of innovation. Early trade show demonstrations showcased the PlayStation 2's USB capabilities, with developers experimenting with motion controls long before they became industry standard. This experimentation would eventually lead to the release of the EyeToy, a camera-based peripheral that introduced a new form of interactive play and inspired a wave of titles aimed at broader, non-traditional audience.

Many analysts initially predicted a close three-way matchup among the PlayStation 2, Xbox and GameCube. While the Xbox boasted the most powerful hardware, and the GameCube was the least expensive of the three, the PlayStation 2 continued to rapidly outsell both platforms. By October 2002, it had sold 40 million units worldwide. Market research firm In-Stat projected that Sony would sell 120 million consoles by 2006, reaffirming the platform's commercial dominance. The report highlighted the expanding scale of the video game industry, characterizing it as an increasingly significant segment of the consumer electronics market. Sony cut the price of the console in 2002 from $299 to $199 in North America, undercutting both the Xbox and GameCube. Further price drops in Japan followed in the following year.

In early 2004, Sony Computer Entertainment America (SCEA) reported over 25 million PlayStation 2 units had sold in North America. Of these, approximately 2.6 million were equipped for online play, with one million users actively engaging in online gaming services. While hardware sales were expected to decline as the PlayStation 2 entered its post-peak sales period, software sales remained strong. Analysts projected continued growth in the platform's game library and online engagement, particularly as new online-compatible titles were released and existing users looked to extend the utility of their consoles.

In September 2004, Sony revealed a newer, slimmer model of the PlayStation 2 dubbed the "Slimline" for US$149 (equivalent to $250 in 2025). An apparent manufacturing issue and underestimated demand caused initial slowdown in producing the new unit caused in part by shortages between the time Sony cleared out the old units and the new units were ready. The issue was compounded in the United Kingdom when a Russian oil tanker became stuck in the Suez Canal, blocking a ship from China carrying PlayStation 2s bound for the Port of Felixstowe. During one week in November 2004, British sales totaled 6,000 units—compared to 70,000 units a few weeks prior. Sony remedied the issue by hiring Russian Antonov An-24 cargo planes to airlift units twice a week. There were shortages in more than 1,700 shops in North America on the day before Christmas.

It became the fastest game console to sell 100 million units by 2008, accomplishing the feat within 5 years and 9 months from its launch; though this was surpassed 4 years later when the Nintendo DS reached 100 million shipments in 4 years and 5 months from its launch.

=== Later years and discontinuation ===
The PlayStation 2 remained the best-selling and most played console by 2008, even surpassing the PlayStation 3. By July 2009, the system had sold 138.8 million units worldwide, with 51 million of those units sold in PAL regions. Later that year, Sony announced that it had discontinued all console colours, however sales remained consistently strong. In 2010, Sony introduced a Bravia television with a built-in PlayStation 2.

Sales dropped significantly to 600,000 units by the beginning of 2012, partly due to the global launch of the PlayStation Vita a few months prior. By March 31, 2012, 12 years after its launch, over 155 million units were sold worldwide. Sony officially stopped supplying updated sales numbers of the system in the same year. Production was officially discontinued on January 4, 2013, after almost thirteen years of production—one of the longest lifespans of any video game console. Sales in the fourth quarter of 2012 reached an "astonishing" 1.6 million units, totalling to 5 million units sold that year, surpassing the previous year's sales of 4.1 million units. New games continued to be made until the end of 2013, including the final expansion pack for Final Fantasy XI for Japan, and FIFA 14: Legacy Edition for North America and South America. The last game ever released for the system was Pro Evolution Soccer 2014 for the United Kingdom on November 8, 2013. Repair services for the system in Japan ended on September 7, 2018, due to a shortage of parts.

In February 2024, Jim Ryan (CEO of Sony Interactive Entertainment) confirmed on the Official PlayStation Podcast that the PlayStation 2 had sold 160 million units worldwide. This statement was not directly corroborated by Sony themselves until eight months later, when this figure officially appeared on the PlayStation 30th Anniversary website in November that year.

== Hardware ==
=== Technical specifications ===
Emotion Engine CPU	PlayStation 2 graphics synthesiser	I/O processor
Emotion Engine CPU	Graphics Synthesizer	I/O processor
memory controller	SCPH-10000 motherboard	SCPH-70001 motherboard
Scratchpad memory controller	An early SCPH-10000 motherboard	A late SCPH-70001 motherboard

The main central processing unit (CPU) is the 64-bit R5900-based "Emotion Engine", custom-designed by Sony and Toshiba. (Note: The Emotion Engine was referred to as a "128-bit" processor in marketing materials, referring to its SIMD instructions that operate on 128-bit wide groups of integers in a single instruction, but the customized variant of the MIPS III instruction set architecture implemented by the processor uses general registers with a size of 64 bits.) The Emotion Engine consists of eight separate "units", each performing a specific task, integrated onto the same die. These units include a central CPU core, two Vector Processing Units (VPU), a 10-channel DMA unit, a memory controller, and an Image Processing Unit (IPU). There are three interfaces: an input output interface to the I/O processor running at a clock speed of 36.864 MHz, a graphics interface to the graphics synthesizer, and a memory interface to the system memory. The Emotion Engine CPU has a clock rate of 294.912 MHz (299 MHz on newer versions) and 6,000 MIPS, with a floating point performance of 6.2 GFLOPS. The system's I/O processor was based on the PlayStation's CPU and was designed to provide full backward compatibility with the PlayStation. The system has 32 MB of RDRAM.

The GPU is likewise custom-designed for the console, named the "Graphics Synthesizer". It has a fillrate of 2.4 gigapixels per second, capable of rendering up to 75 million polygons per second. The GPU also runs with a clock frequency of 147.456 MHz (which is half the clock speed of the Emotion Engine), 4 MB of DRAM is capable of transmitting a display output of 1280 x 1024 pixels on both PAL and NTSC televisions. The PlayStation 2 has a maximum colour depth of 16.7 million true colours. When accounting for features such as lighting, texture mapping, artificial intelligence, and game physics, the console has a real-world performance of 25 million polygons per second. The PlayStation 2 also features two USB ports, and one IEEE 1394 (Firewire) port for SCPH-10000 to 3900x models only. A hard disk drive can be installed in an expansion bay on the back of the console, and is required to play certain games, notably the popular Final Fantasy XI. The system has 4 MB of Video RAM in the form of eDRAM.

Software was distributed primarily on DVD-ROMs, with earlier titles being published on blue-tinted CD-ROM format. In addition, the console can play audio CDs and DVD films and is backward-compatible with almost all original PlayStation games. The PlayStation 2 also supports PlayStation memory cards and controllers, although original PlayStation memory cards will only work with original PlayStation games and the controllers may not support all functions (such as analogue buttons) for PlayStation 2 games. The standard PlayStation 2 memory card has an 8 megabyte (MB) capacity and features MagicGate encryption.

The PlayStation 2 can natively output video resolutions on SDTV and HDTV from 480i to 480p (NTSC) and 576i to 576p (PAL/SECAM), and some games, such as Gran Turismo 4 (2004) and Tourist Trophy (2006), are known to support up-scaled 1080i resolution. The PlayStation 2 supports the following standards: composite video(480i/576i), S-Video (480i/576i), RGB SCART (576i/p), VGA (for progressive scan games and PS2 Linux only), YP_{B}P_{R} component video (240p, 480i/p, 1080i), and D-Terminal. Cables are available for all of these signal types; these cables also output analogue stereo audio. Additionally, an RF modulator is available for the system to connect to older TVs.

=== Models ===
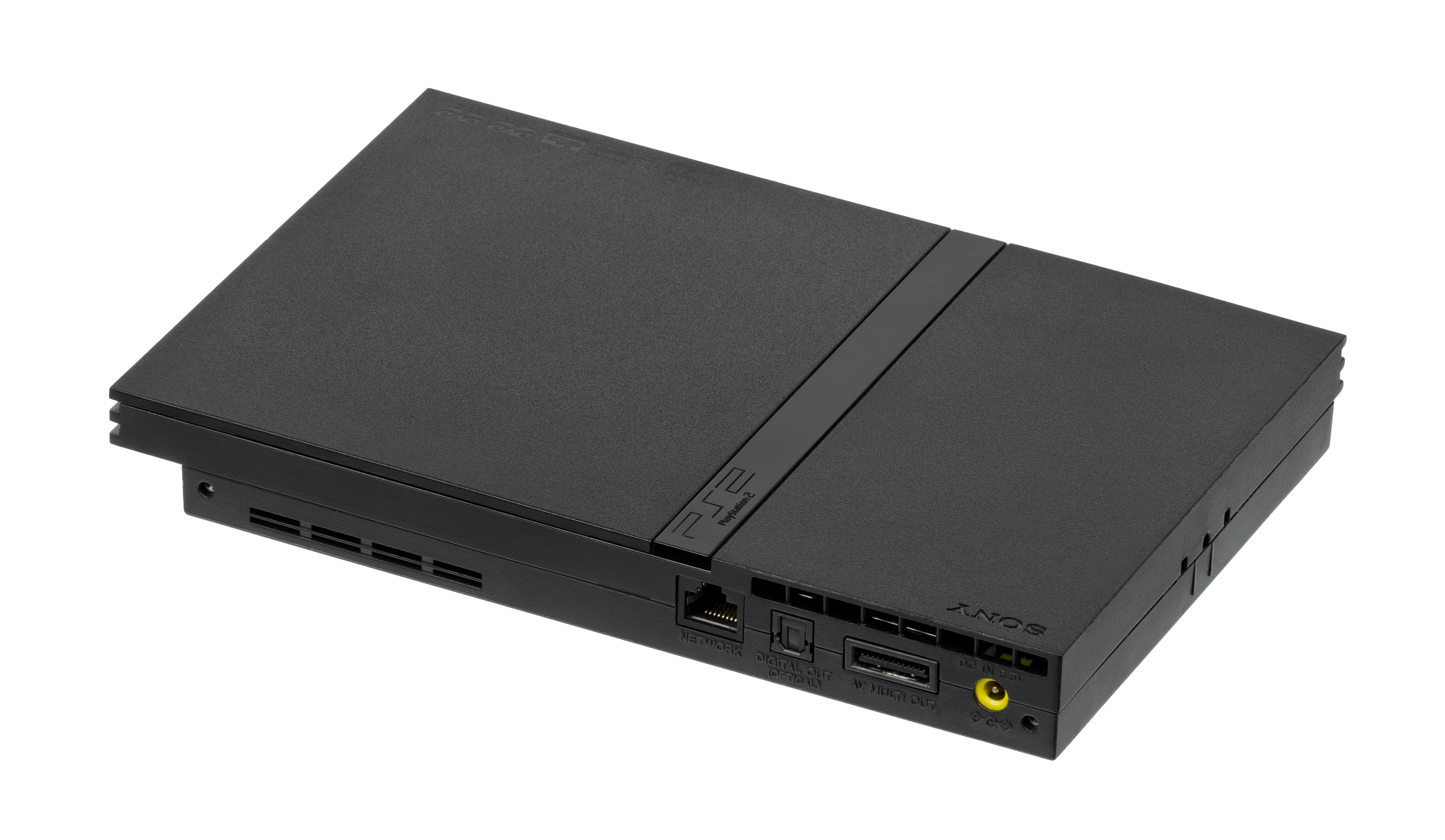
Rear of the "slimline" model, showing its built-in networking

The PlayStation 2 underwent many revisions during its lifespan. It is primarily differentiated between models featuring the original "fat" case design and "slimline" models, which were introduced at the end of 2004. In 2010, the Sony Bravia KDL-22PX300 was made available to consumers. It was a 22" HD-Ready television which incorporated a built-in PlayStation 2.

The standard color of the PS2 is matte black. Several variations in color were produced in different quantities and regions, including ceramic white, light yellow, aqua, metallic silver, navy blue, opaque blue, midnight black, pearl white, sakura purple, satin gold, satin silver, snow white, super red, ocean blue, and pink, which was distributed in some regions such as Oceania, and parts of Asia.

In October 2004, Sony released the "Slimline", a smaller, redesigned version of the original PlayStation 2. It includes a built-in Ethernet port and an external power supply. Due to its thinner profile, it does not contain the 3.5" expansion bay and therefore does not support the internal hard disk drive. The removal of the expansion bay was criticized as a limitation to software, due to the existence of titles such as Final Fantasy XI, which required the HDD use. The slimline model features a top-loading disc mechanism, replacing the motorized tray-loading system of the original version. Like its predecessor, the slimline console is designed to operate in both horizontal and vertical orientations; however, vertical placement requires a dedicated stand for stability.

Sony also manufactured a consumer electronic device, the PSX, which was marketed as an all-in-one home media center. Integrating nanotechnology, the system combines the PlayStation 2's Graphics Synthesizer and Emotion Engine processors into a single chipset, known as the 90 nm EE+GS. In addition to its gaming capabilities, the PSX features an integrated analogue television tuner, as well as the ability to record both television programmes and DVDs. The device also supports broadband internet connectivity and features a memory card slot, enabling users to view digital photographs and play MP3 audio files directly on a connected television. It was released exclusively in Japan on December 13, 2003, in two models: the DESR-5000, featuring a 160 GB hard drive, priced at ¥79,800, and the DESR-7000, with a 250 GB hard drive, priced at ¥99,800.

=== Online support ===
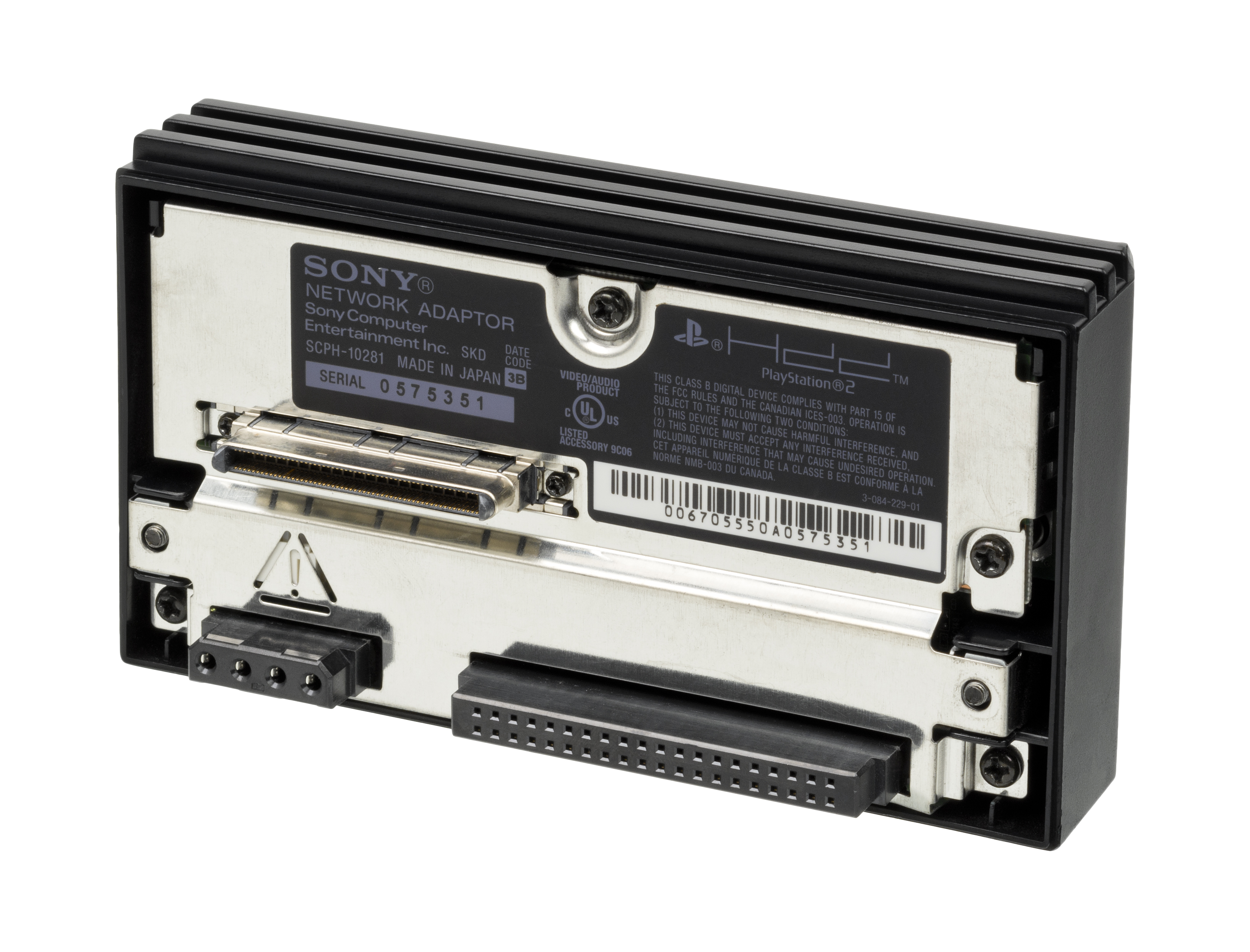
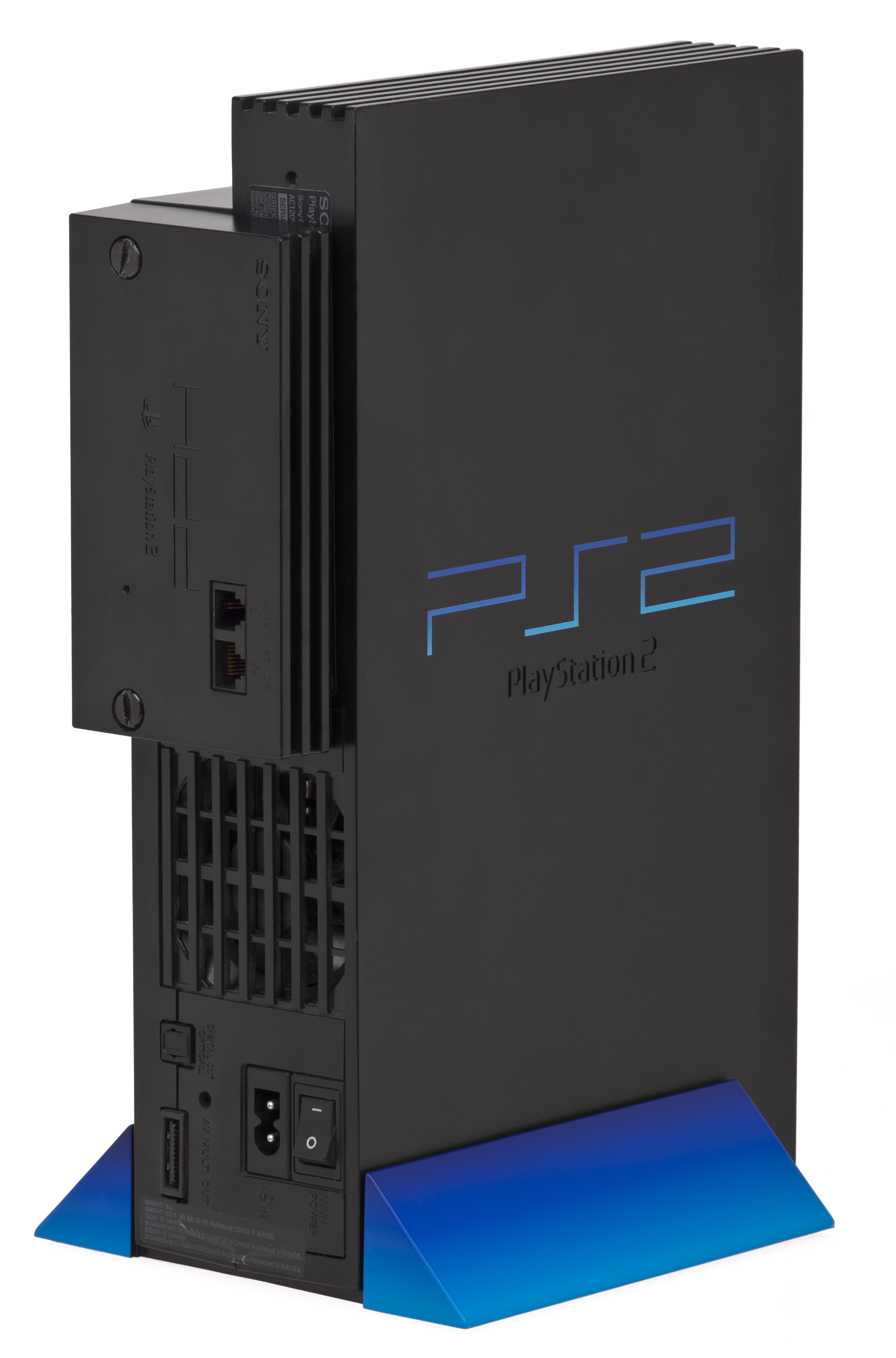
A PS2 Network Adaptor shown by itself (top) and inserted to a console (North American Dial-up/LAN/broadband version; bottom)

The PlayStation 2 introduced optional online functionality via a dedicated network adaptor, which enabled both Ethernet and dial-up Internet connections. The hardware component of the adaptor was compact—smaller than a standard paperback book—and installed easily into the expansion bay at the rear of the console. Once secured with two screws and connected to a telephone line or Ethernet cable, the adaptor was ready for use. Sony did not operate their own subscription-based online service for the PlayStation 2, instead allowing users to connect through existing Internet service providers. However, some providers, such as AOL, imposed additional charges for console connectivity—typically around $4.95 per month.

A key distinction in Sony's approach was their support for both broadband and dial-up connections, in contrast to Microsoft's broadband-only requirement for the Xbox. While broadband provided a significantly smoother experience, Sony's decision ensured greater accessibility for users with limited internet infrastructure. For households with established home networks, connecting the PlayStation 2 via Ethernet to a router was straightforward and efficient. Sony also delegated the responsibility for online functionality to individual game developers and publishers. Each third-party developer was required to manage their own servers and infrastructure for their respective titles. This decentralized model meant that users often needed to create separate login credentials for each game, and the quality of online services varied depending on the developer's expertise and resources.

=== Controllers ===
The PlayStation 2's DualShock 2 controller retains most of the same functionality as its predecessor, with several key enhancements. The most significant functional upgrade is the inclusion of pressure-sensitive inputs across all primary controls. Unlike the original DualShock controller, which featured only digital input for the directional pad and face buttons, the DualShock 2 allowed for 255 levels of pressure sensitivity on the directional pad; four face buttons, and four shoulder buttons. Aesthetically, the DualShock 2 is distinguished by its black color scheme and minor adjustments in weight and internal components. It is marginally lighter than the original, due in part to a reduction in the mechanical complexity of the vibration motors. The DualShock 2 maintained the overall layout and ergonomics of the original controller. Like its predecessor, the DualShock 2 controller has force feedback, or "vibration" functionality.

Specialized controllers include light guns (GunCon), fishing rod and reel controllers, a Dragon Quest VIII "slime" controller, a Final Fantasy X-2 "Tiny Bee" dual pistol controller, an Onimusha 3 katana controller, and a Resident Evil 4 chainsaw controller.

=== Peripherals ===
EyeToy	DVD remote	8MB memory card
EyeToy camera	DVD remote	8MB memory card
PlayStation Multitap	40GB hard drive	Network adaptor
Multitap	40GB hard drive	Network adaptor

Much like the original PlayStation, Sony released a series of peripherals to add extra layers of functionality. Such peripherals include memory cards, a DVD remote control, an internal or external hard disk drive (HDD), network adapter, horizontal and vertical stands, the Multiplayer Adapter (a four-player multitap), a USB motion camera (EyeToy), keyboard and mouse, and a headset. Unlike the original PlayStation, which requires the use of an official PlayStation Mouse to play mouse-compatible games, the few PlayStation 2 games with mouse support also work with a standard USB mouse as well as a USB trackball.

Early versions of the console could be networked via an i.LINK port, though this had little game support and was ultimately removed in the "Slimline" model. Some third-party companies, such as Joytech, produced LCD monitor and speaker attachments for the PlayStation 2, which attach to the rear of the console. These allow users to play games without access to a television as long as there is access to mains electricity or a similar power source.

There are many accessories for music games, such as dance pads for Dance Dance Revolution titles, Konami microphones for use with the Karaoke Revolution games, wireless microphones (sold with and used exclusively for SingStar games), various "guitar" controllers (for the GuitarFreaks series and Guitar Hero series), the drum set controller (sold in a box set (or by itself) with a "guitar" controller and a USB microphone (for use with Rock Band and Guitar Hero series), and a taiko drum controller for Taiko: Drum Master (2004).

Sony released a Linux-based operating system kit, Linux for PlayStation 2, which included a keyboard, mouse, Ethernet adapter and HDD. In Europe and Australia, the consoles comes with a free Yabasic interpreter on the bundled demo disc. This allows users to create simple programs for the PlayStation 2. A port of the NetBSD project and BlackRhino GNU/Linux, an alternative Debian-based distribution, are also available.

== Game library ==
The PlayStation 2 features a diverse global library. Premier franchises include the Grand Theft Auto, Final Fantasy, Silent Hill, Gran Turismo, Persona and Metal Gear series, most games of which were released exclusively for the console. Several prolific series first arrived on the console, including God of War (2005), Ratchet & Clank (2002), Jak and Daxter: The Precursor Legacy (2001), Sly Cooper (2002), Katamari (2004), Devil May Cry (2001), and Kingdom Hearts (2002). The best-selling PlayStation 2 game is Grand Theft Auto: San Andreas (2004), which sold 17.33 million units. After the PlayStation 2's discontinuation in 2013, the cumulative software shipment was 1.54 billion units.

Following its 2000 launch in Japan, the PlayStation 2 was released with 11 launch titles; early notable games included Ridge Racer V (2000) and Tekken Tag Tournament (2000). This was increased to 29 titles for its North American launch, and 30 in Europe. The last games released for the console were Final Fantasy XI: Seekers of Adoulin (2013) in Japan, FIFA 14 (2013) in North America, and Pro Evolution Soccer 2014 (2013) in the United Kingdom.

== Reception ==
The PlayStation 2 received critical acclaim upon release. Initial reviews commended its hardware and graphics capabilities, ability to play DVDs, and backward compatibility with games and hardware for the original PlayStation. Early points of criticism included the lack of online support at the time, its inclusion of only two controller ports, and the system's price at launch compared to the Dreamcast in 2000. PC Magazine in 2001 called the console "outstanding", praising its "noteworthy components" such as the Emotion Engine CPU, 32 MB of RAM, support for IEEE 1394 (branded as "i.LINK" by Sony and "FireWire" by Apple), and the console's two USB ports while criticizing its "expensive" games and its support for only two controllers without the multitap accessory.

The inclusion of DVD playback was a major factor in the commercial success of the PlayStation 2. At launch, the PS2 was priced comparably to standalone DVD players, making it an attractive option for consumers. This multifunctionality also increased the console's appeal beyond traditional gamers and accelerated DVD adoption in households.

There was, however, some concern about the system's abilities following the lack of anti-aliasing in the two most popular early titles, Ridge Racer V (2000) and Tekken Tag Tournament (2000). It was exacerbated for a period of time post-launch amid concerns about the relative lack of new quality software. This situation was eventually turned around following a spate of highly acclaimed games in the final quarter of 2001. Later reviews, especially after the launch of the competing GameCube and Xbox systems, continued to praise the PlayStation 2's large game library and DVD playback, while routinely criticizing the PlayStation 2's lesser graphics performance compared to the newer systems and its rudimentary online service compared to Xbox Live. In 2002, CNET rated the console 7.3 out of 10, calling it a "safe bet" despite not being the "newest or most powerful", noting that the console "yields in-game graphics with more jagged edges". CNET also criticized the DVD playback functionality, claiming that the console's video quality was "passable" and that the playback controls were "rudimentary", recommending users to purchase a remote control. The console's two controller ports and the high cost of its memory cards were also a point of criticism.

The slim model of the PlayStation 2 received positive reviews for its small size and built-in networking, but received criticism for easily overheating due to the exclusion of the original model's built-in fan. The requirement for a separate power adapter was criticized while the top-loading disc drive was noted as being less likely to break compared to the tray-loading drive of the original model.

=== Legacy ===
The PlayStation 2 overcame the earlier launch of the Sega's Dreamcast and then fended off competition from Microsoft's newcomer Xbox and Nintendo's GameCube. Its immense success and failure of the Dreamcast were among the main factors which led to Sega abandoning the console market entirely. Sony's integration of a DVD player into the console not only positioned it as a cost-effective home entertainment device, but also helped broaden its reach beyond traditional gaming audiences. This feature contributed to the PlayStation 2's widespread adoption, particularly as DVD technology was gaining popularity.

Additionally, the console served as the exclusive platform for several early landmark titles such as Grand Theft Auto III (2001), Final Fantasy X (2001), and Metal Gear Solid 2: Sons of Liberty (2001), during a period marked by significant innovation in game design. This era saw the emergence of cinematic storytelling and expansive open-world gameplay, which further solidified the system's appeal. According to Piers Harding-Rolls, a senior analyst at IHS Screen Digest, Sony's marketing strategy—particularly its alignment with association football—was instrumental in securing strong market penetration in regions where console gaming had previously been underdeveloped. In its later years, the PlayStation 2 expanded its demographic by incorporating lifestyle and social games, further enhancing its longevity and appeal during the mid-2000s.

The PlayStation 2 has often ranked among the best video game consoles. In 2020, Keith Stuart from The Guardian named it as the second best console, declaring that its "utter dominance" and technical prowess heralded a golden era in video gaming. IGN ranked the PlayStation 2 in 2009 as the third best console, noting its diverse game library and appeal towards all audiences to be a strong testament to its "staying power". In 2018, Retro Gamer named it the fifth best console, similarly crediting its large library and appeal to developers as key factors in gaining mass success, lauding it as a machine with "mad architecture".

== See also ==
- Linux for PlayStation 2
- PCSX2 – PlayStation 2 (PS2) emulator for Microsoft Windows, Linux, and macOS
- PlayStation Broadband Navigator
