= PSX =

PSX may refer to:

- Pakistan Stock Exchange, a stock exchange in Pakistan with trading floors in Karachi, Islamabad and Lahore
- Phillips 66 (NYSE ticker: PSX), an American multinational energy company
- PlayStation (console) (codenamed PSX), a home video game console developed and marketed by Sony Computer Entertainment
- PlayStation Experience, an annual event for the video game industry presented by Sony Interactive Entertainment
- PSX (digital video recorder), a Sony digital video recorder with a fully integrated PlayStation 2 home video game console
