= PSX (digital video recorder) =

Sony digital video recorder with an integrated PlayStation 2

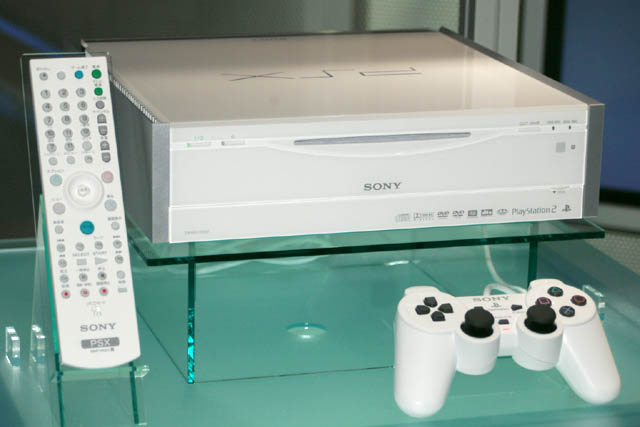
- PSX on display at CEATEC 2003
- Developer: Sony Computer Entertainment
- Manufacturer: Sony Corporation
- Product family: PlayStation
- Type: Digital video recorder; Home video game console
- Generation: Sixth
- Released: JP: December 13, 2003
- Introductory price: 160 GB: ¥79,800 (equivalent to ¥90,657 in 2024); 250 GB: ¥99,800 (equivalent to ¥113,378 in 2024)
- Discontinued: JP: 2005
- Media: DVD, CD
- Operating system: XrossMediaBar, G Guide
- CPU: Emotion Engine
- Storage: 160 or 250 GB hard drive
- Removable storage: 8 MB PS2 memory card; 128 KB PS1 memory card
- Display: Composite video; S-Video; D-Terminal
- Graphics: Graphics Synthesizer
- Sound: Dolby Digital 5.1; DTS 5.1
- Input: Remote control
- Controller input: DualShock 2, DualShock
- Connectivity: Details: 2 × MagicGate memory card; 1 × i.LINK IEEE 1394 interface*; 1 × USB 1.1; 1 × MemoryStick/PRO/Duo; 2 × infrared receiver; 2 × DualShock 2 controller port; 1 × Fast Ethernet (100 base/TX); 1 × D-Terminal out (component video); 1 × VHF/UHF in; 1 × VHF/UHF out; 1 × BS-IF in; 1 × BS-IF out*; 1 × S-Video out; 1 × composite video out; 2 × S-Video in; 2 × composite video in; 1 × S/PDIF out (TOSLINK) *7500/7700 only
- Power: 100 V, 50/60 Hz
- Dimensions: 312 × 323 × 88 mm (12.3 × 12.7 × 3.5 in)
- Weight: 5.8 kg (13 lb)
- Predecessor: PlayStation
- Successor: PlayStation 3
- Related: PlayStation 2; PlayStation Portable
- Website: psx.sony.co.jp

The PSX is a digital video recorder and home video game console released by Sony in Japan on December 13, 2003. Since it was designed to be a general-purpose consumer video device, it was marketed by the main Sony Corporation instead of Sony Computer Entertainment and does not carry the usual PlayStation branding. Initial sales were strong, with the console selling 100,000 units during its first week, thus selling out. Its high cost, however, resulted in poor sales later on, prompting Sony to cancel plans to release the PSX outside Japan. After the price had been lowered in September 2004, sales increased again.

== Features ==
The device is a fully functional digital video recorder with an included Infrared remote control and S-Video, composite video, and RF inputs. It is able to tune analog VHF, UHF, and CATV. It can also be linked with a PlayStation Portable to transfer photos, videos and music via USB ports, and features software for non-linear video editing, image editing and audio editing. DVD+R support was to be introduced in a future update.

It was the first device to use Sony's XrossMediaBar (XMB) graphical user interface, which was later used on the PlayStation Portable, PlayStation 3, some Blu-ray Disc players, and 2008-era BRAVIA TVs. Like standard PS2 consoles, the PSX can be laid horizontally or stood up vertically.

The PSX fully supports both PlayStation and PlayStation 2 software by its slot-loading DVD drive, as the onboard EE+GS chip is a unification of the PS2's Emotion Engine and Graphics Synthesizer chips. Online game compatibility was available using the broadband connection; Games that used the PS2 HDD (such as Final Fantasy XI) were supported as well.

Shortly before release, Sony omitted numerous features from the PSX, citing that it was necessary to launch by Christmas 2003 time. Playback of CD-R and DVD+RW discs for example were dropped, as well as MP3 format audio, and instead DVD-RW discs and ATRAC format audio were retained upon release. However, firmware updates (versions 1.10 and 1.20) added these features later on.

== Peripherals ==
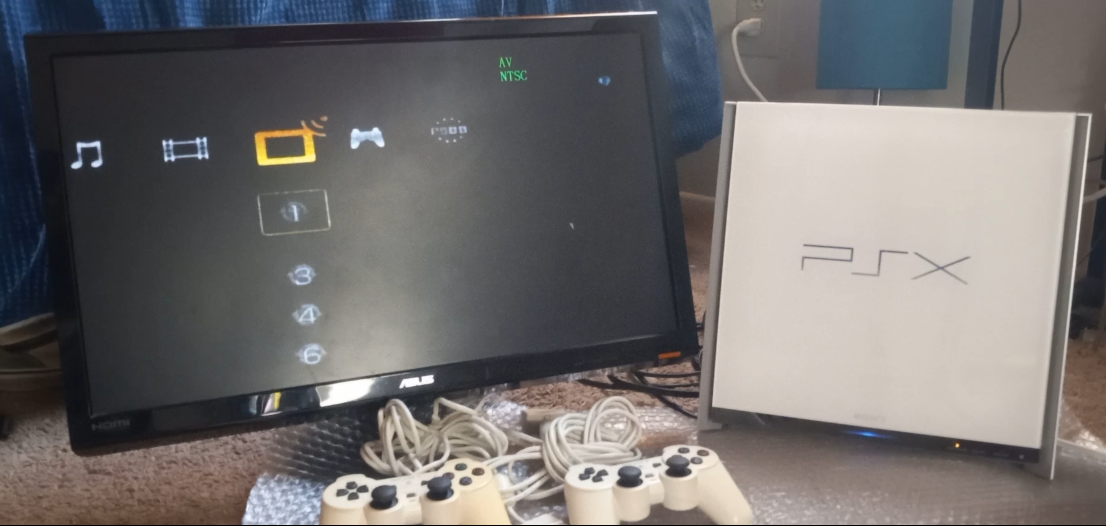
PSX DESR 7000 with its XrossMediaBar menu

The PSX is compatible with all first-party PlayStation and PlayStation 2 controllers and memory cards, with the exception of the PocketStation. The main unit has two controller ports located on the back side and two memory card slots on the front side hidden behind a panel cover. While the unit itself was sold without a game controller, a PSX-branded variant of the DualShock 2 analog controller was sold separately which features a 4-meter long cord (a bit longer than the standard versions of the controller). Because of the different placement of controller ports and memory card slots (which are located above each other on standard PlayStation and PlayStation 2 consoles), the PSX is incompatible with all versions of the multitap, and no PSX-specific multitap was ever made to get around this issue. Games that require the use of two or more USB ports are also incompatible with the PSX.

== Retail configurations ==
The PSX was released in eight retail configurations during its lifespan; the 5000 series (with an embossed logo on top and grey stripe at the back) shipped with 160 GB Hard disk drives, while the 7000 series (with a colored logo on top and black stripe at the back) contained 250 GB drives. Software updates were made available by disc and download.

The 7500/7700 models added a Ghost Reduction Tuner. The inclusion of BS and UHF/VHF connectors varied by model. Starting with firmware version 2.10, users could export videos to a Memory Stick. The exported files are compatible for playback on the PSP. This feature is unavailable on earlier models due to the later firmware versions never being released for them. Contrary to popular belief, no variant of this console supports PSP games or is compatible with UMD discs.

Comparison of PSX systems
Model No.	Power Consumption	Weight	Case		Hard Drive	FireWire	VHF/UHF tuner		BS tuner analog only		Memory Stick video export	Writable disc formats	Release Firmware	Current Firmware	Launch pricing	Release date
Model No.	Power Consumption	Weight	Color	Light strip	Hard Drive	FireWire	In	Out	In	Out	Memory Stick video export	Writable disc formats	Release Firmware	Current Firmware	Launch pricing	Release date
DESR-5000	80 W	5.7 kg	white	–	160 GB	No	Yes	No	Yes	No	No	DVD-RW, DVD-R, DVD+RW (DVD+RW only on Firmware 1.20 or later)	1.06	1.31	79,800 ¥	December 13, 2003
DESR-7000	80 W	5.8 kg	white/transparent	back	250 GB	No	Yes	No	Yes	No	No	DVD-RW, DVD-R, DVD+RW (DVD+RW only on Firmware 1.20 or later)	1.06	1.31	99,800 ¥	December 13, 2003
DESR-5100	80 W	5.7 kg	white	–	160 GB	No	Yes	No	Yes	No	No	DVD-RW, DVD-R, DVD+RW	1.30	1.31	74,000 ¥	July 1, 2004
DESR-5100S	80 W	5.7 kg	silver	–	160 GB	No	Yes	No	Yes	No	No	DVD-RW, DVD-R, DVD+RW	1.30	1.31	–	July 1, 2004
DESR-7100	80 W	5.8 kg	white/transparent	back	250 GB	No	Yes	No	Yes	No	No	DVD-RW, DVD-R, DVD+RW	1.30	1.31	95,000 ¥	July 1, 2004
DESR-5500	70 W	6.2 kg	white	front	160 GB	No	Yes	Yes	No	No	Yes (after having been updated to 2.11)	DVD-RW, DVD-R, DVD+RW, DVD+R	2.06	2.11	44,800 ¥	December 2004
DESR-7500	84 W	6.5 kg	white/transparent	front, back	250 GB	Yes	Yes	Yes	Yes	Yes	Yes (after having been updated to 2.11)	DVD-RW, DVD-R, DVD+RW, DVD+R	2.06	2.11	59,800 ¥	December 2004
DESR-5700	70 W	6.2 kg	white	front	160 GB	No	Yes	Yes	No	No	Yes	DVD-RW, DVD-R, DVD+RW, DVD+R	2.10	2.11	60,000 ¥	April 2005
DESR-7700	84 W	6.5 kg	white/transparent	front, back	250 GB	Yes	Yes	Yes	Yes	Yes	Yes	DVD-RW, DVD-R, DVD+RW, DVD+R	2.10	2.11	80,000 ¥	April 2005

All models have two sets of status LEDs and Infrared receivers; one along the front for horizontal orientation, and a second strip along the top-back for vertical orientation. The 'HDD Access' indicator was added to the front of the device in later models. Additionally, some models have one or two decorative blue LED light strips, either on the front located under the disc slot or in the back. DESR-5XXX consoles have a solid white case with an embossed PSX logo (except DESR-5100S, which has a silver case). DESR-7XXX consoles have a clear-white case with a colored PSX logo printed on.

== Etymology ==
Up until the release of the PlayStation 2, the first PlayStation console came to be known colloquially outside of Japan by its provisional codename of PSX (this was adopted to echo the MSX, a home computer standard sold by Sony and other companies throughout the 1980s). This can cause some confusion as to which device is being referred to.

== Colors ==
The PSX was initially displayed at CEATEC in white, silver, yellow, red and blue. The white variant was released commercially, with a limited edition silver model made available in 2004.

== See also ==
- Panasonic Q
