= PlayStation 2 accessories =

Overview of the accessories made for the PlayStation 2

Various accessories for the PlayStation 2 video game console have been produced by Sony, as well as third parties. These include controllers, audio and video input devices such as microphones and video cameras, and cables for better sound and picture quality.

== Game controllers ==
=== DualShock 2 ===
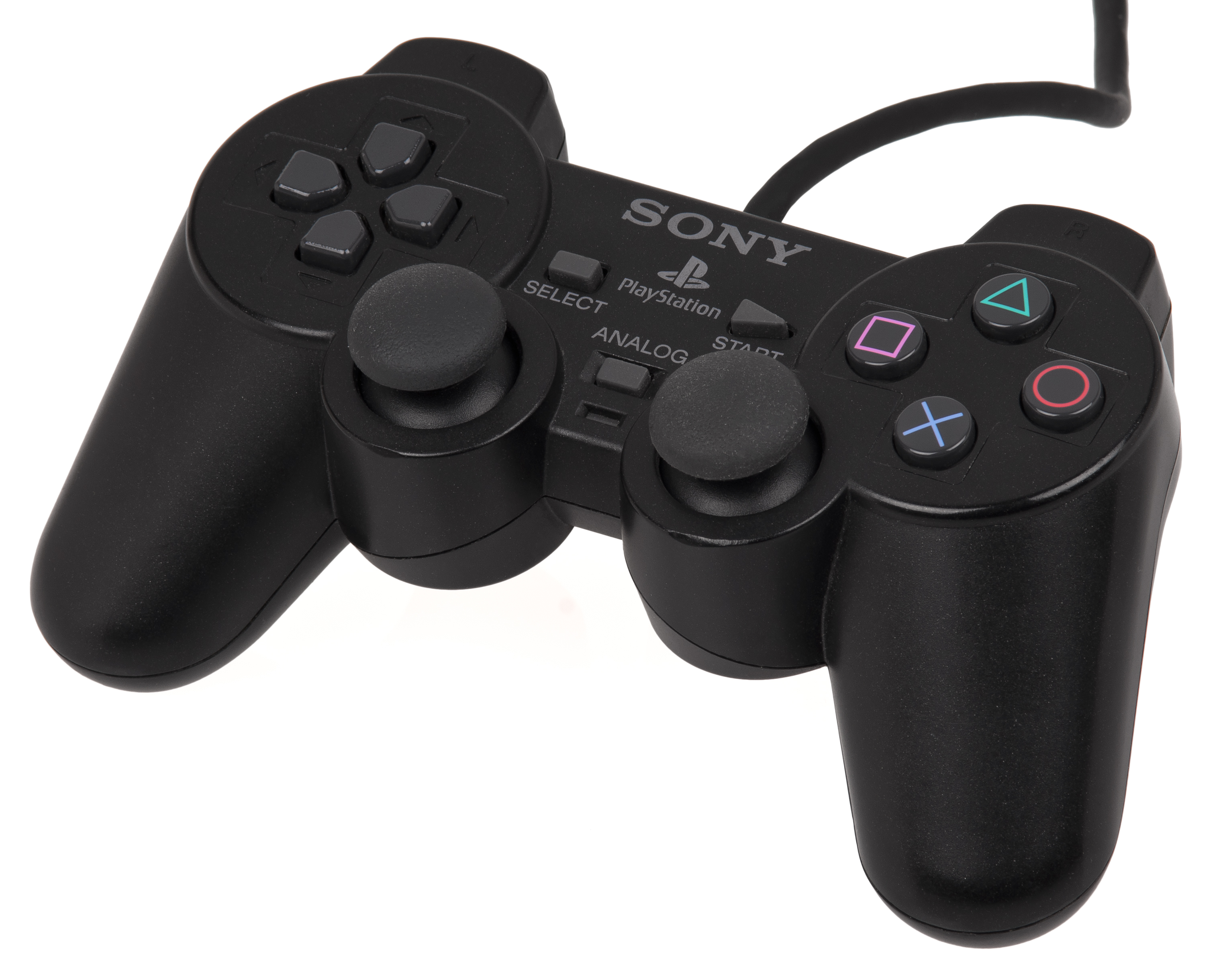
Standard black DualShock 2 controller

The DualShock 2 Analog Controller (SCPH-10010) is the standard controller for the PlayStation 2 and is almost identical to the original DualShock controller for the original PlayStation console with only minor changes. All the buttons other than L3, R3 and "Analog" feature analog pressure sensitivity; the connecting cable is slightly longer than the original DualShock and is black rather than grey; the connector is squarer; DualShock 2 is printed on the top of the controller and it features two more levels of vibration feedback.

=== Logitech Cordless Action Controller ===
Logitech Cordless Action Controller
- Manufacturer: Logitech
- Type: Video game controller
- Generation: Sixth generation era
- Input: Inputs: 2× Analog sticks (8-bit precision); 10× Pressure sensitive buttons (L1, R1, L2, R2, Start, Select); Pressure sensitive D-Pad; 3× Digital buttons ("Analog", L3, R3)
- Connectivity: PlayStation (2) controller port, proprietary 2.4 GHz wireless.
- Dimensions: 155 × 102 × 60 mm; 6.1 × 4 × 2.36 in
- Successor: Logitech Cordless Precision Controller

The Logitech Cordless Action Controller is an officially licensed wireless controller for the PlayStation 2 made by Logitech. It features all of the inputs found the standard DualShock 2 controller, i.e. ten analog (pressure-sensitive) buttons (L1, R1, L2, R2, Start and Select), three digital buttons (L3, R3 and the analog mode button) and two analog sticks. As its buttons are pressure-sensitive, the controller is compatible with games which require a DualShock 2. The controller also features two vibration motors for haptic feedback, which are compatible with DualShock/DualShock 2 enabled games. As a power saving measure, the vibration may be turned on or off by the user by way of a button on the controller's face. It is powered by two AA batteries. It communicates with the console using a proprietary 2.4 GHz RF protocol wireless by way of a dongle which connects to the PS2's controller port in a similar manner to Nintendo's WaveBird wireless controller.

=== Logitech Cordless Controller ===
Logitech Cordless Controller
- Manufacturer: Logitech
- Type: Video game controller
- Generation: Sixth generation era
- Input: Inputs: 2× Analog sticks (8-bit precision); 10× Pressure sensitive buttons (L1, R1, L2, R2, Start, Select); Pressure sensitive D-Pad; 3× Digital buttons ("Analog", L3, R3)
- Connectivity: PlayStation (2) controller port, proprietary 2.4 GHz wireless.

Like the Logitech Cordless Action Controller, the Logitech Cordless Controller is an officially licensed wireless PlayStation 2 controller made by Logitech. It features all of the buttons (including analog functionality) of the standard DualShock 2 controller and is compatible with games requiring a DualShock 2. It is powered by two AA batteries, and as a power-saving measure, the vibration function can be turned off. It communicates with the console via a wireless dongle which connects to the PS2's controller port and uses a proprietary 2.4 GHz RF technology.

=== Sega Saturn PS2 Controller ===
The Sega Saturn PS2 Controller is a controller for the PS2 based around the Sega Saturn type-2/Japanese style controller. The controller is officially licensed by both Sony and Sega, and the first version was released in black exclusively in Japan in 2005. A second version was produced in the color purple as part of a joint venture between Sega and Capcom to coincide with the launch of Vampire: Darkstalkers Collection in Japan. Other than the connector, it is almost identical to the original Saturn controller, with a few minor changes. In place of the original Saturn start button are indented PlayStation style start and select buttons. Additionally, the reset, stop, play/pause, rewind and fast-forward labels above the X, Y, Z, L and R buttons have been removed, and labels of the corresponding PlayStation buttons have been added as listed below.

Saturn button	PlayStation button
A	Cross
B	Circle
C	R1
X	Square
Y	Triangle
Z	L1
L	L2
R	R2

=== Logitech Driving Force GT ===
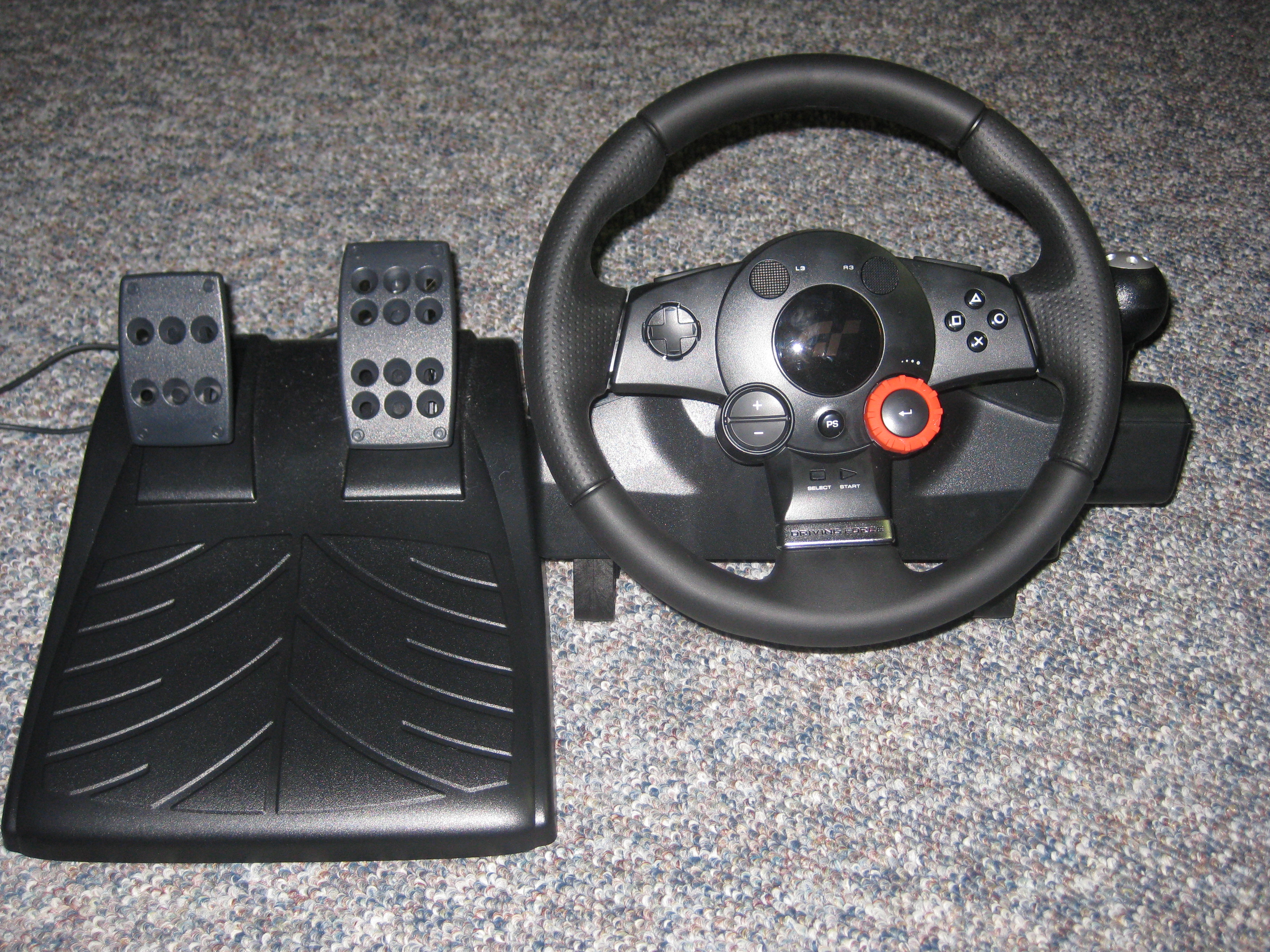
A Logitech Driving Force GT wheel and pedals

=== Arcade sticks ===
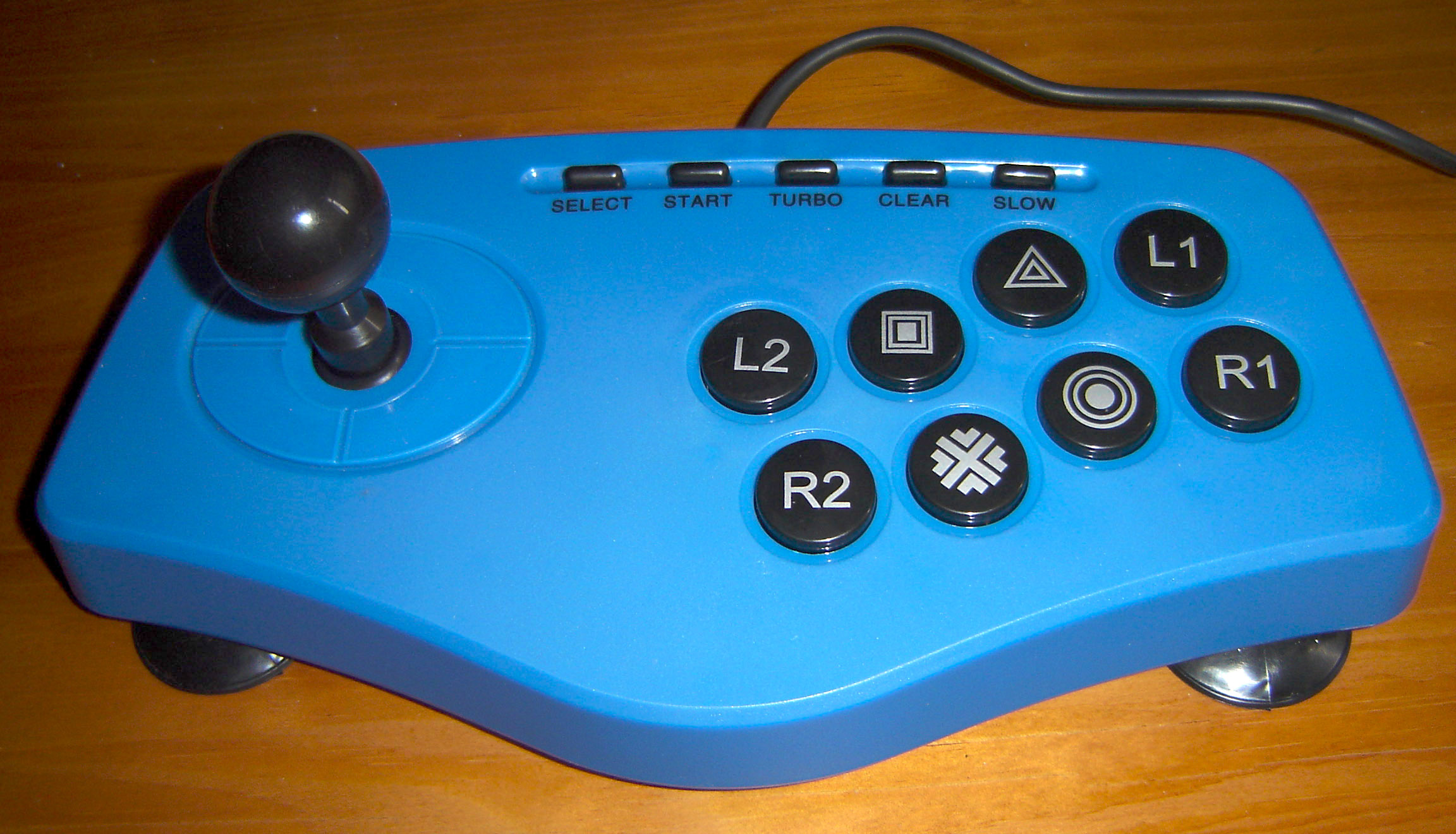
A PS2 arcade stick.

=== Rhythm game controllers ===
==== Microphones ====
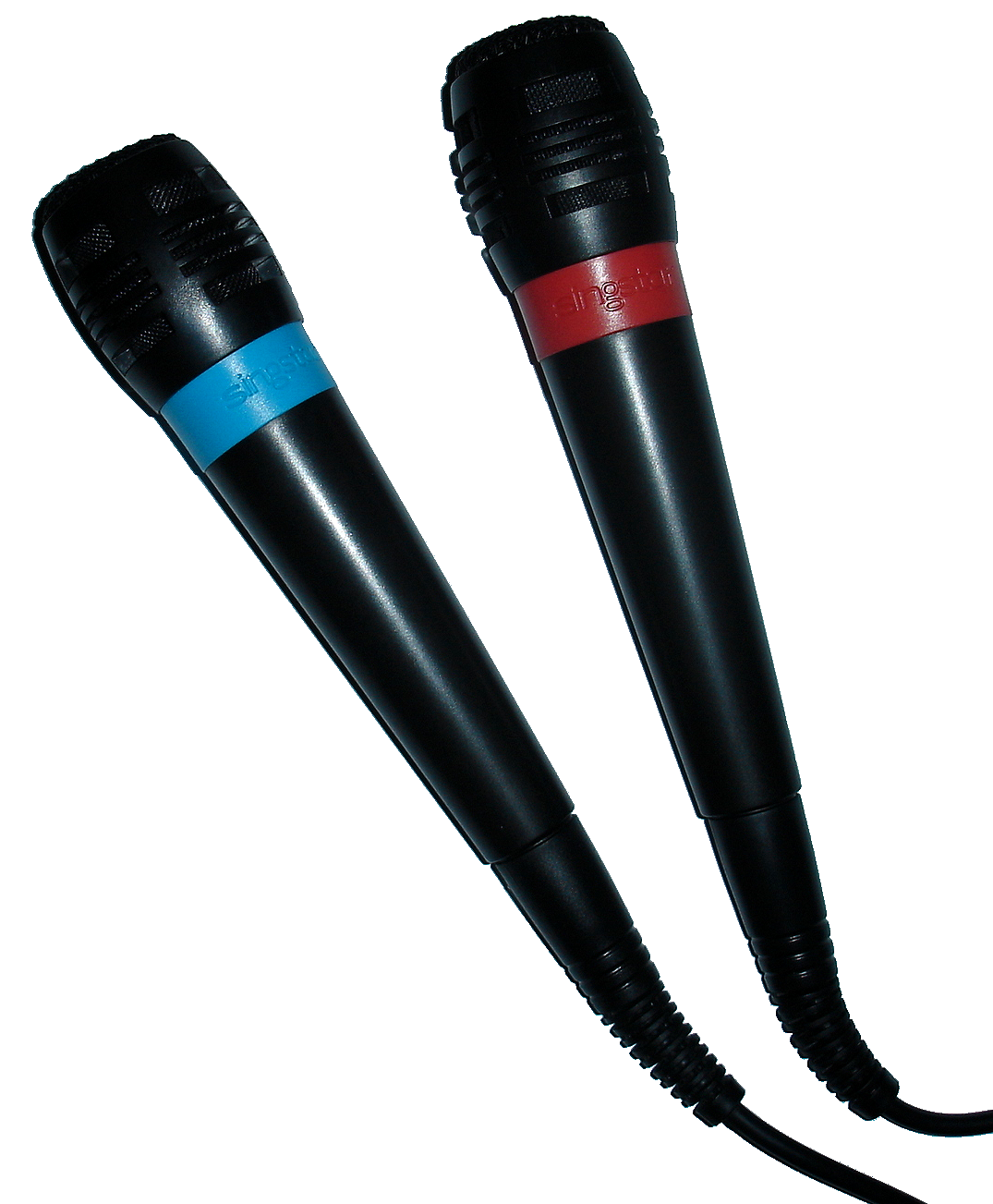
Wired Singstar microphones

Various microphones are available for use on the PlayStation 2 with rhythm games such as Sony's own Singstar karaoke games and Harmonix's Rock Band series. Singstar microphones are available in both wired and wireless varieties; both connect to the console via USB.

==== Dance mats/pads ====
On certain PS2 Games that are dance pad compatible allows the player to follow alongside on the game actions as the player must perform, they are usually found on games such as, Dance Dance Revolution games.

=== Buzz! Buzzer ===
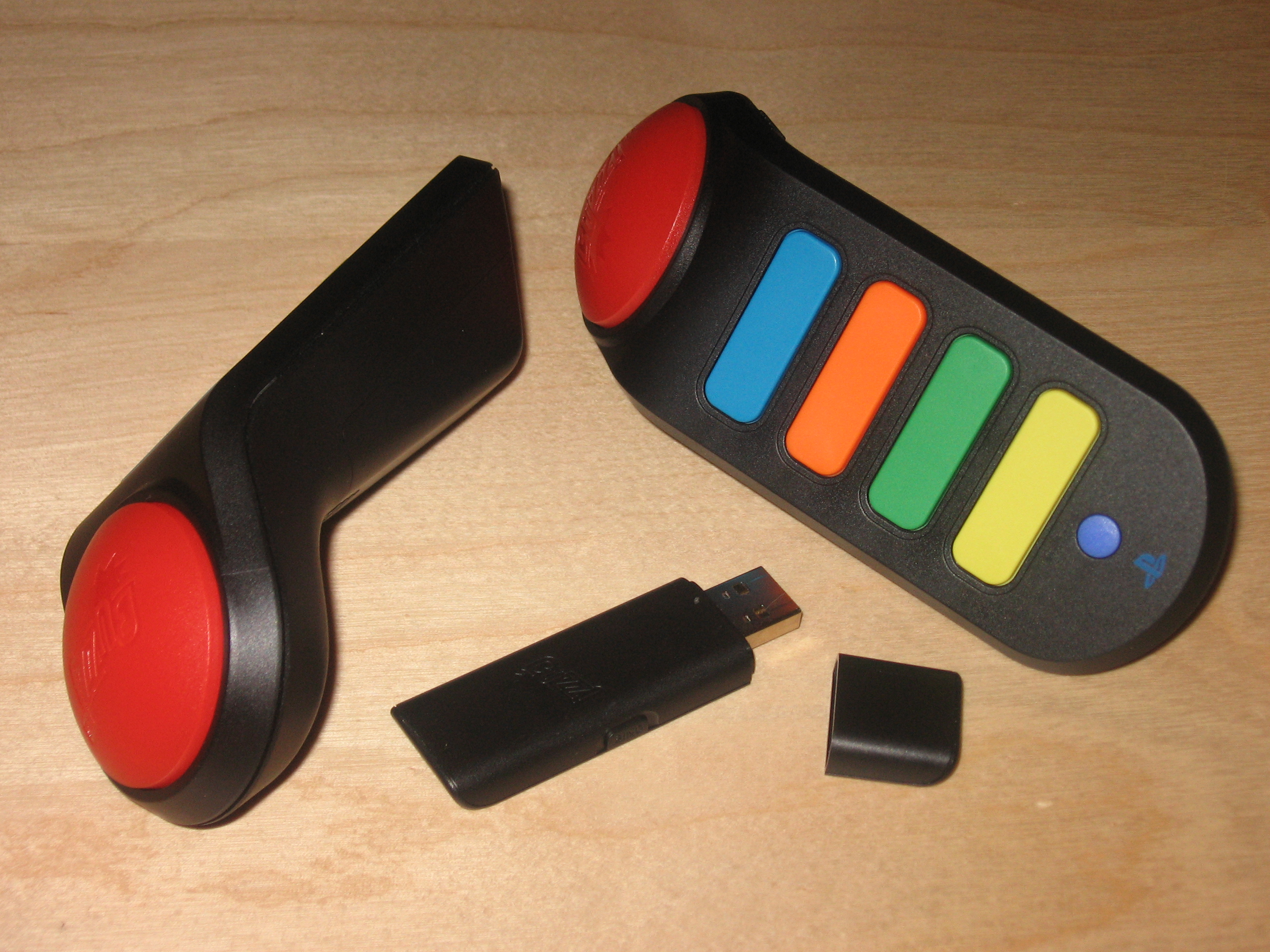
Wireless Buzzers and USB adapter

The Buzz! Buzzer is a special controller designed specifically for the Buzz! quiz game series. The controllers feature large red buzzer buttons and four smaller coloured buttons for answer selection. Both wired and wireless versions are available and come bundled with Buzz! games. A four-buzzer set acts as a single USB device and connects a USB port on the PlayStation 2. Wireless versions connect via a USB dongle, with each dongle able to support up to 4 wireless buzzers at a time. A second dongle is required for additional buzzers (for 8 player games). Both the wired and wireless versions of the buzzers are compatible with both PlayStation 2 and PlayStation 3. The Xbox 360 Big Button Pads heavily resemble and fulfil the same function as buzzers.

=== DVD Remote Control ===
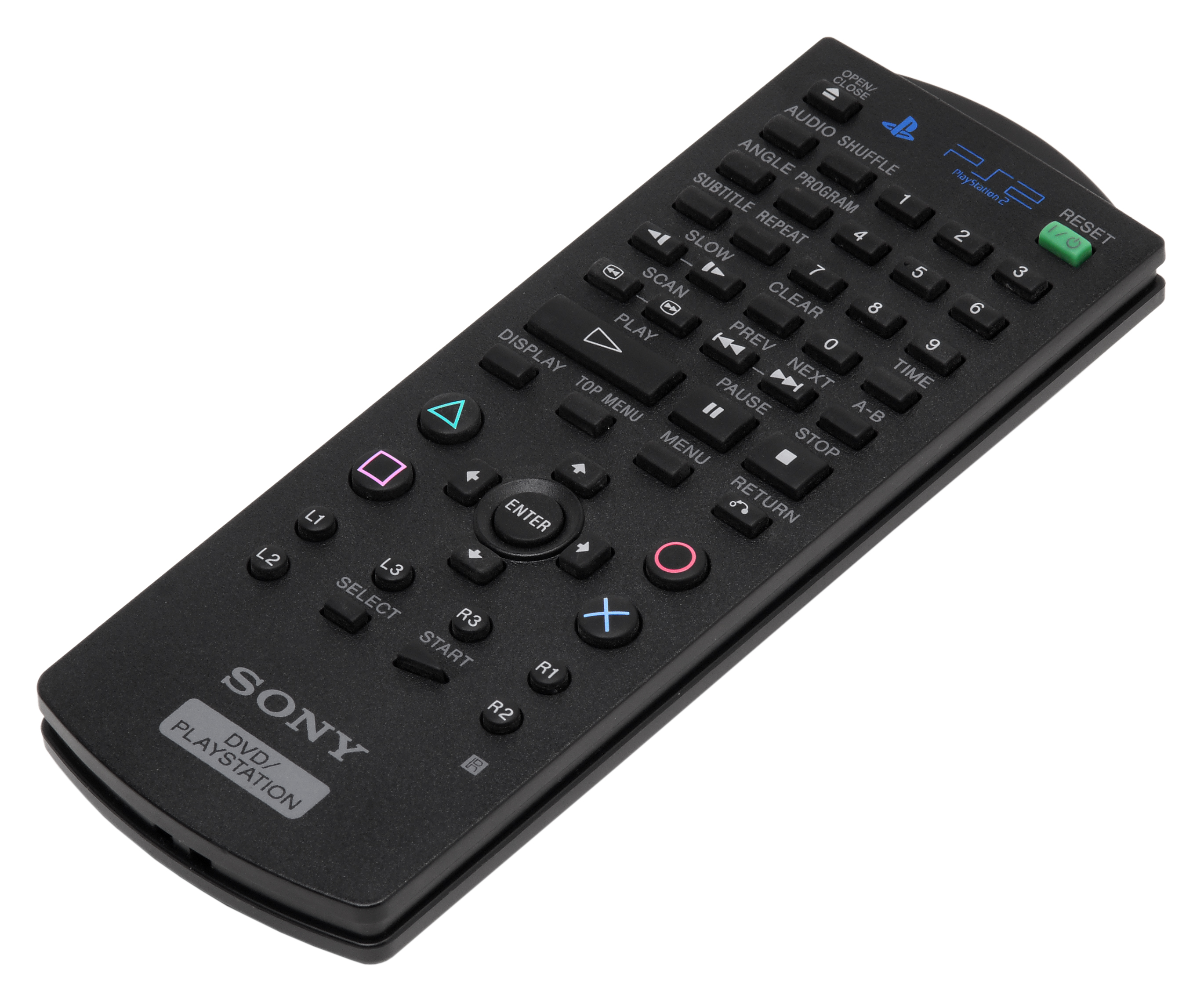
PS2 DVD remote control (new model)

The DVD Remote Control is an infrared remote control for the PlayStation 2 designed to allow easier control of DVD movies. The first remote came bundled with an infrared receiver dongle (SCPH-10160) which attached to one of the PS2's controller ports; this dongle is not needed on later PS2 models (beginning from SCPH-500xx) and slimline PS2 models (SCPH-700xx to SCPH-900xx) as they featured an integrated IR port.

There are two different models of the DVD remote control that were released, which had minor differences. The first one to be released is the SCPH-10150 (some are labeled as SCPH-10170, 10171 or 97042). The second, SCPH-10420U/97076, is visually and functionally identical apart from the addition of eject and reset/power buttons. The eject button only works on the SCPH-500xx fat PS2 model, as the slimline PS2 models had no motorized disc tray to eject.

Both versions of the remote featured all of the standard PS2 buttons in addition to DVD playback controls.

== A/V cables ==
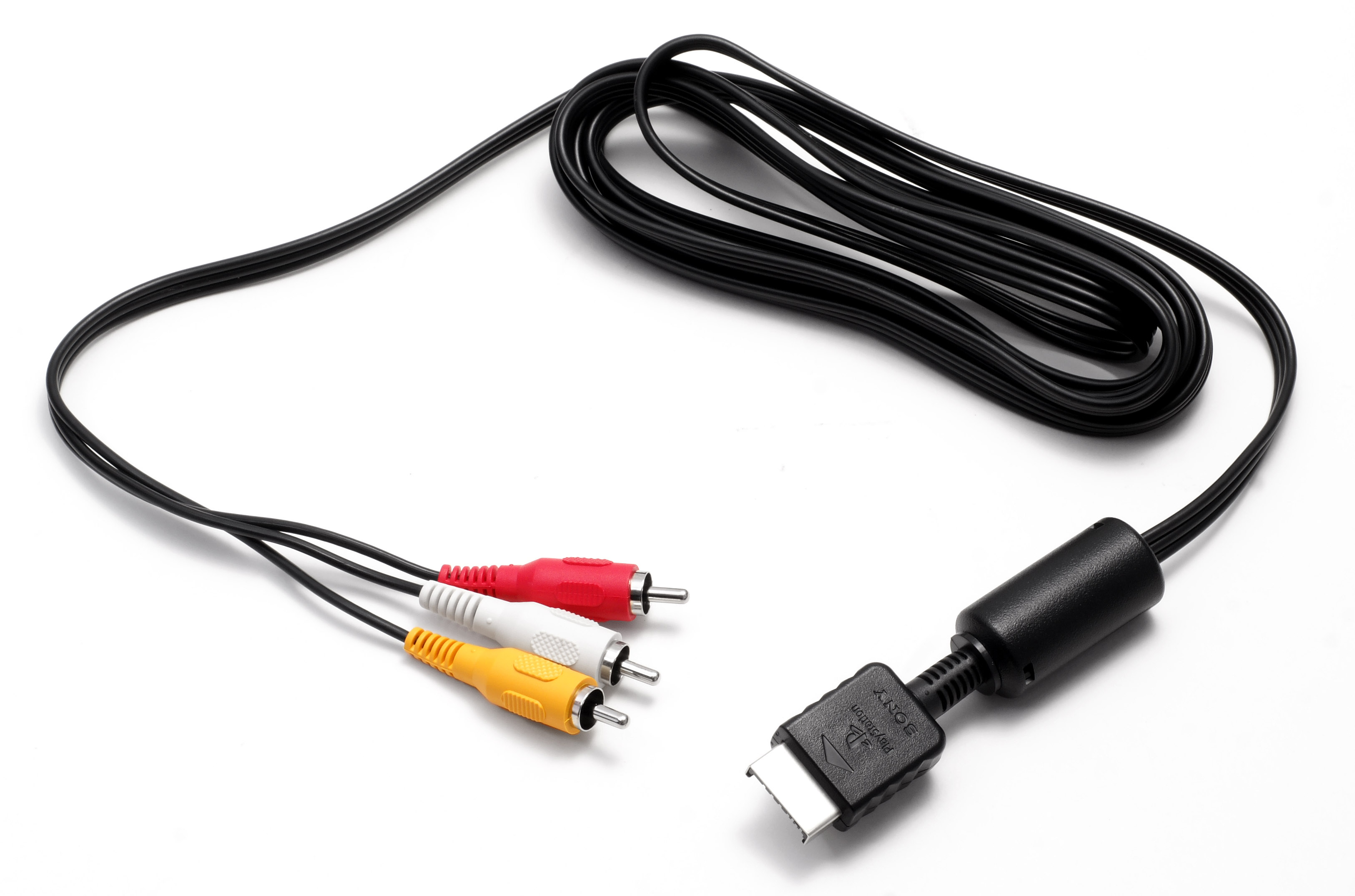
PlayStation A/V (composite video/stereo audio) cable

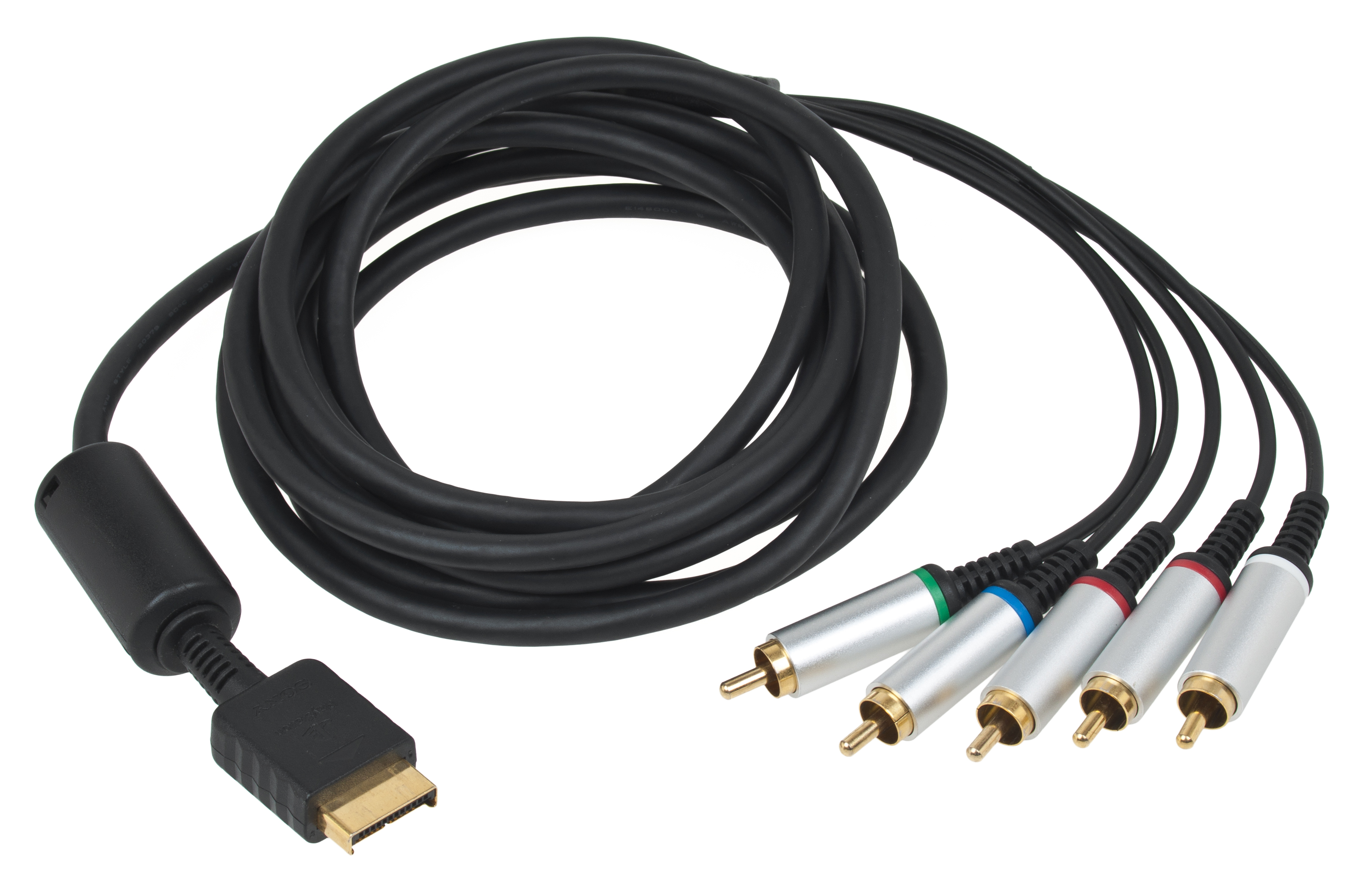
PlayStation component (YP_{B}P_{R}) cable

Various A/V cables have been made available for the PlayStation 2, offering varying levels of picture quality. Additionally, the PS2 features a TOSLINK port, which facilitates the output of digital S/PDIF audio - 2-channel LPCM, 5.1-channel Dolby Digital and 5.1-channel DTS (the latter two are only available during DVD playback when it is encoded on the disc). The PS2 is compatible with all PlayStation and PlayStation 3 cables which use the AV-multi port.

=== RFU adapter ===
The RFU Adapter (SCPH-1122) is an RF Modulator and cable that carries mono audio and video at 576i/50 Hz (PAL) or 480i/60 Hz (NTSC) via an RF signal and connects using a TV aerial plug. It is similar to the RFU adapter cable available for the PlayStation.

=== A/V (Composite) cable ===
The AV cable (SCPH-10500) is included with the PS2 and carries dual-channel (stereo) audio and composite video at 576i/50 Hz (PAL) or 480i/60 Hz (NTSC). It is identical to the composite cables available for the PlayStation and PlayStation 3. Consoles in PAL territories also come bundled with a composite/stereo SCART adapter block to facilitate connection to SCART enabled TVs. This is merely an adapter and provides no quality improvement over a direct composite connection.

=== S-Video cable ===
The S-Video cable (SCPH-10060U/97030) carries dual-channel (stereo) audio and S-Video at 576i/50 Hz (PAL) or 480i/60 Hz (NTSC), which provides a clearer picture than the standard A/V (composite) cable.

=== A/V Adaptor ===
The AV Adaptor with S Video Out Connector (SCPH-10130) is a break-out box which provides an additional AV-Multi out port, as well as composite, S-Video and stereo audio connectors to allow connection to an A/V receiver or similar device.

=== EURO A/V (RGB SCART) cable ===
The EURO A/V Cable (SCPH-10142) is a SCART cable capable of carrying 576i/50 Hz or 480i/60 Hz using the RGB standard, as well as standard stereo audio and composite video. It provides a clearer picture than either S-Video or composite signals. The Euro A/V Cable can also carry 480p and 1080i signals, but to do so it switches off RGBs (RGB Sync) signals and switches to RGsB (RGB sync on green). This can lead to compatibility issues with certain monitors and even SCART to HDMI upscalers. To use the EURO A/V cable, the PS2 must be set to RGB mode in the options.

=== Component A/V cable ===
The Component A/V Cable (SCPH-10100 and SCPH-10490) is a cable capable of carrying 576i/50 Hz or 480i/60 Hz using the YP_{B}P_{R} and RGB standards, as well as standard stereo audio, via RCA connectors. It provides a clearer picture than either S-Video or composite signals. It is also required for games which support other video modes such as "progressive scan" (480p) or 1080i. While the PS2 does support 240p output (which includes PS1 games) through component video, it is not supported in the YP_{B}P_{R} standard, and so may cause some compatibility issues with newer TVs and HDTVs when playing PS1 games or games with 240p progressive scan mode. To use the Component A/V cable, the PS2 must be set to YP_{B}P_{R} mode in the options.

=== D-Terminal cable ===
The D-Terminal cable is identical to that of the Component A/V Cable in functionality apart from its connector, which uses the Japanese D-Terminal standard instead of RCA connectors. It was only sold in Japan.

=== VGA cable ===
The PlayStation 2 VGA cable carries RGBHV video via a VGA connector. It is only compatible with progressive scan games and PS2 Linux. Because the PS2 does not output separate sync, sync on green (RGsB) must be used instead, which may cause compatibility issues with some monitors.

== Other accessories ==
=== Memory Card ===
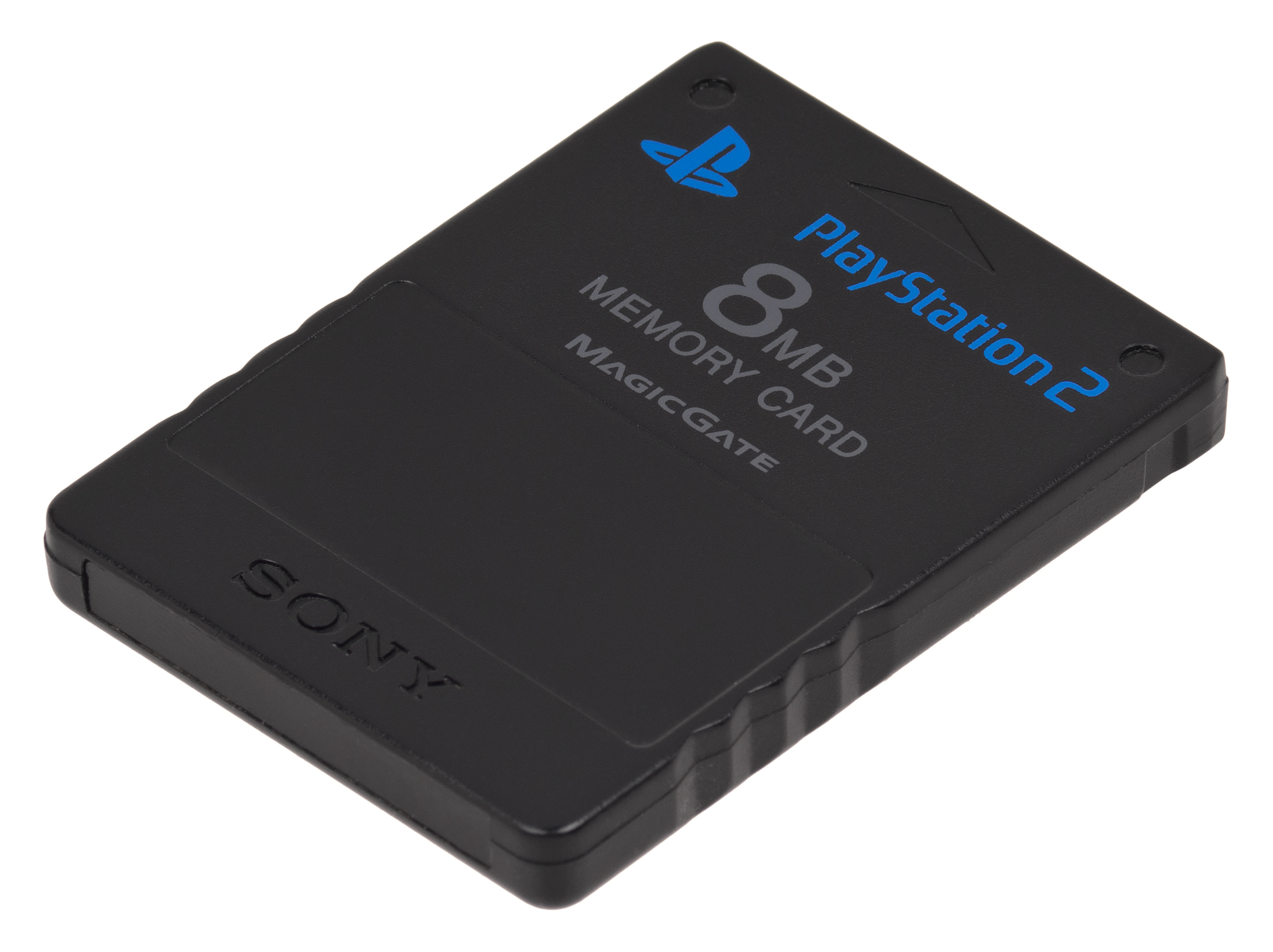
Official PS2 Memory Card

The Memory Card (8 MB) (SCPH-10020) with MagicGate encryption is used to store settings, EyeToy video messages and savegames. It is the earliest known commercial product to use ferroelectric RAM (FeRAM). The Memory Card's microcontroller (MCU) contains 4 KB of embedded FeRAM manufactured by Toshiba. It was fabricated using a 500 nm complementary metal–oxide–semiconductor (CMOS) process. These memory cards came in black, satin silver, pink, crimson red, ocean blue and emerald in PAL and NTSC territories, with more exclusive variants in Japan.

Official Sony memory cards are only available at a size of 8 MB. Later, Sony partnered with a third-party accessories company Katana to make Memory Cards that came in 16 MB and 32 MB. These were officially licensed products, as they all have the PlayStation 2 logo and word-mark along with the MagicGate logo on them.

Third party memory cards are available from different manufacturers and vendors, with storage capacities of up to 256 MB.

=== Multitap ===
The Multitap for PlayStation 2 allows up to four controllers and four memory cards to be attached to a single controller port and memory card slot. Up to 8 controllers and memory cards may be attached to the console at any one time by using two multitaps simultaneously. Certain Multitaps will not work with specific PS2 models due to slight differences in slot placement. SCPH-10090 was designed to fit the original consoles, while SCPH-70120 was instead designed for the slim consoles.

=== EyeToy ===
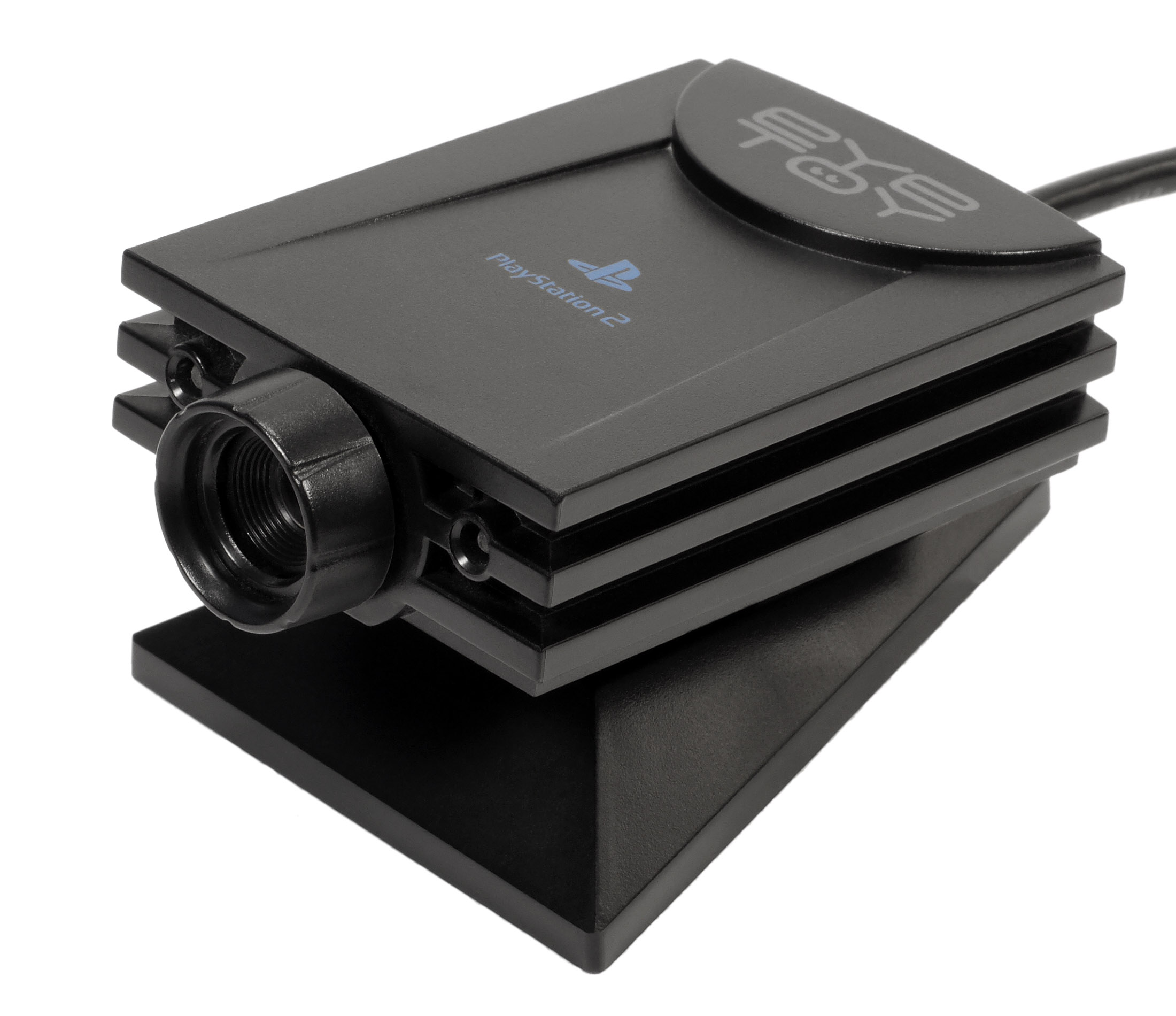
A PlayStation 2 EyeToy.

The EyeToy is a digital camera device, similar to a webcam, for the PlayStation 2. Originally, EyeToys were manufactured by Logitech (known as "Logicool" in Japan), while later models were manufactured by Namtai. The EyeToy is mainly used for playing specifically designed EyeToy games, but can also be used to capture images and videos. It is also compatible with the PlayStation 3.

=== Headset ===
The PS2 headset connects via USB 1.1 on the front of the console. The headset is most commonly used in online multiplayer games; however, it can also be used in some karaoke style games, for voice control, and to enhance the immersive experience of some single player games.

=== Headphone Splitter ===
The 3.5mm Audio Stereo Y Splitter can transfer audio from the PlayStation 2 into two output devices, including headphones, headset, and speakers.

=== Network Adapter ===
The PlayStation 2 Network Adaptor is an optional accessory for use with some internet multiplayer compatible games. It can also be paired with a PS2 hard disk drive. The original "fat" PS2 models required the purchase of a separate network adapter to play online, while the PS2 Slim models had one built-in.

=== Keyboard and Mouse ===
An official PlayStation 2 USB keyboard and mouse came bundled as part of the Linux for PlayStation 2 kit, which turns any original model PS2 into a Linux computer. Any other standard USB keyboard and mouse will also work. In addition to the Linux kit, there were a handful of games that used a keyboard and mouse or just a mouse or trackball.

=== Vertical Stand ===
The Vertical Stand is attached to the PlayStation 2 console to allow it to stand vertically. Three different versions are available: SCPH-10040 for original (large) consoles, SCPH-70110 for slimline SCPH-700xx consoles and SCPH-90110 for slimline SCPH-900xx consoles.

=== Horizontal Stand ===
The horizontal stand is attached to the base of original "fat" PlayStation 2 consoles to add height, and style.
