= CEATEC =

Trade show in Japan

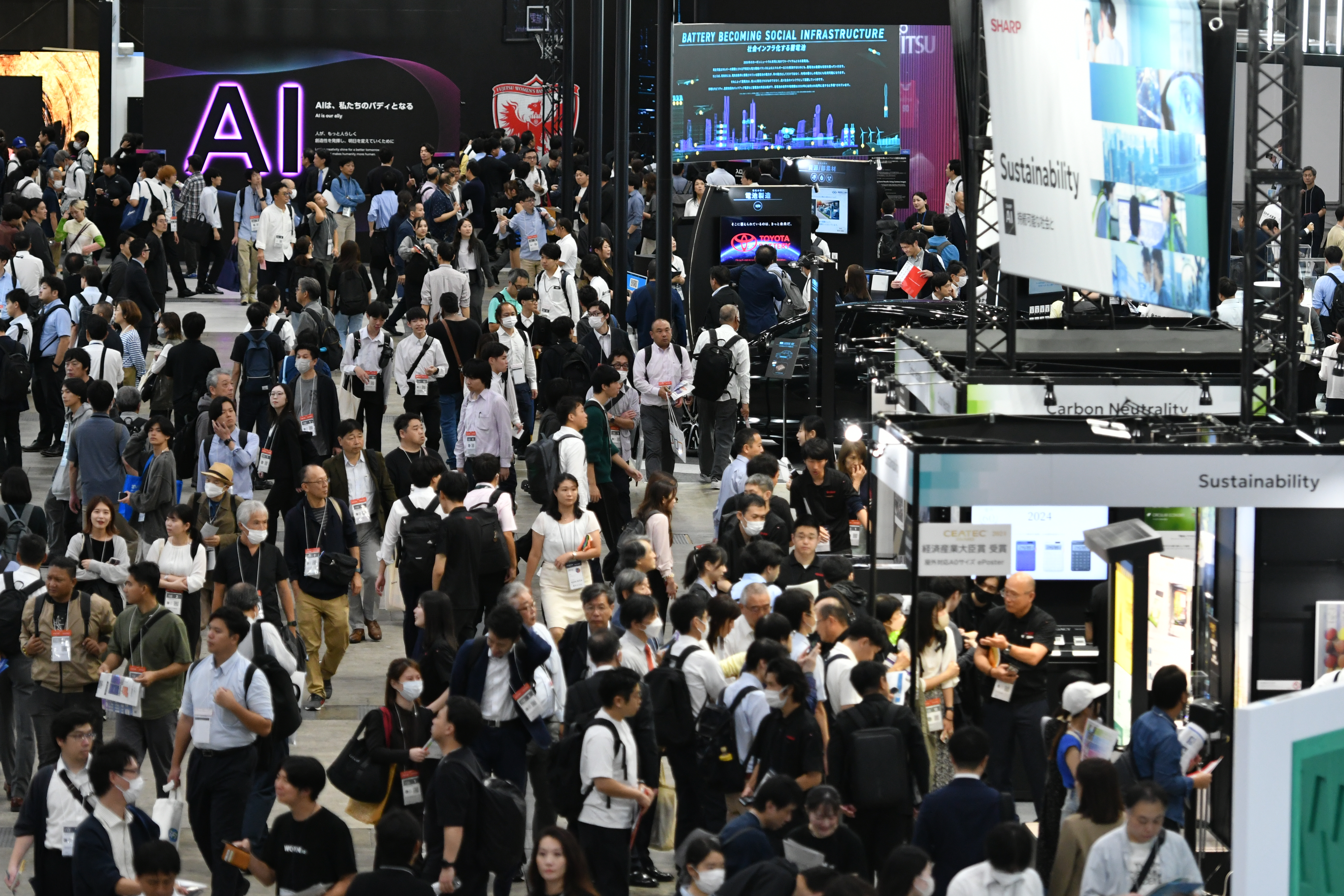

Combined Exhibition of Advanced Technologies (also known as CEATEC) is an annual trade show in Japan. It is regarded as the Japanese equivalent of Consumer Electronics Show. It is Japan's largest IT and electronics exhibition and conference.

== History ==
The show is held every year in October in Makuhari Messe since the first CEATEC in 2000. The most recent exhibition, the ninth iteration of CEATEC, was held between September 30 to October 4, 2008. CEATEC Japan 2008, attracted nearly 197,000 visitors, with some 804 exhibitors and 138 seminars. Attendance was down from the almost 206,000 people and 895 companies in 2007 as it apparently felt the crunch of the 2008 financial crisis.

== Show highlights ==
=== 2003 ===
Sony shown off the PSX.

=== 2007 ===
Sony and Panasonic announced devices that could play as well as record shows in Blu-ray Disc format.

=== 2014 ===
NTT DoCoMo will show their latest technologies, while both Sharp and SEGA mentioned about attending in their Twitter posts.

== See also ==
- CeBIT (Hanover, Germany)
- CES (Las Vegas, Nevada, USA)
- COMDEX (Las Vegas, Nevada, USA)
- COMPUTEX (Taipei, Taiwan)
- Mobile World Congress (Barcelona, Spain)
- GITEX (Dubai, UAE)
