= Michael Gartenberg =

American technology journalist

- Occupations: Technology journalist; blogger
- Website: Michael Gartenberg Blog

Michael Gartenberg is an American technology journalist, analyst and blogger. He is a former Apple Inc. employee, and was previously a Research Director at Gartner, focussed on the world of the interconnected consumer.

Gartenberg now writes as Analyst-in-Residence for imore.com.

== Work ==
After a 10-year absence, Gartenberg re-joined Gartner in 2010. He previously worked as a partner at Altimeter Group, as Vice President of Strategy and Analysis at Interpret, LLC, and as a vice president at Jupiter Research.

Gartenberg had an aborted employment with Microsoft. He was hired in February 2007 with the job title "Enthusiast Evangelist" to publicize Windows Vista but left after three weeks in March 2007, returning to his former job at Jupiter Research.

Gartenberg also contributes to many media outlets. He has monthly online columns in Computerworld and Macworld and a weekly online column on Engadget. He previously wrote a weekly column for SlashGear.

In October 2007, regarding a potential Microsoft Windows competitor, Linux, he wrote "Linux still doesn't make it on desktop.... For now and the foreseeable future, it's going to remain a Microsoft world. Linux still isn't the answer." Gartenberg repeated the claim in an opinion piece published in March 2010, wherein he denied that use of a free operating system significantly reduces cost of computer ownership.

In July 2009, Google announced the development of an operating system for netbooks, ChromeOS, due for release in late 2010. Gartenberg opined "Chrome OS is not a threat to Windows.... By creating of lot of Fear, Uncertainty and Doubt this morning... they hope to take the attention and luster off of [Microsoft] Windows 7" and "... history doesn't run in favour of Chrome OS's principles".
