= D-Terminal =

Analog video connector used in Japan

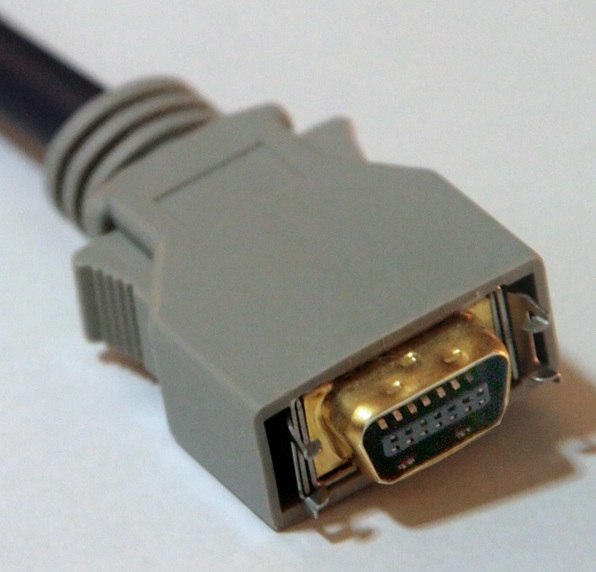
- A D-Terminal connector
- Type: Analogue video connector

Production history
- Designer: EIAJ (Electronic Industry Association of Japan)
- Designed: July 1999 (EIAJ RC-5237); January 2000 (JEITA CP-4120)
- Produced: Late 1990s to present
- Superseded: S-Video

General specifications
- Audio signal: device-dependent
- Video signal: Analogue component video: 480i, 480p, 1080i, 720p, 1080p
- Pins: 14 (6 video, 3 data, 3 reserve, 2 detection)

Data
- Data signal: Resolution, scanning format, and aspect ratio information

D-Terminal (Japanese: D端子, Hepburn: D Tanshi; lit. D Connector) is a type of analogue video connector found only on consumer electronics sold in Japan. It was developed by the Electronic Industries Association of Japan (EIAJ) under standards EIAJ RC-5237 and JEITA CP-4120 for use in high-definition digital broadcasts.

The connector gets its name from the trapezoidal shape resembling a D, just like with the D-subminiature connector family. It does not come from the word "digital".

== Overview ==
The connector was standardised by the EIAJ under the RC-5237 specification in July 1999 as the "D Connector for Digital Broadcasting Component Video Signal(Y,Pb,Pr)connection". It began to see widespread use in the Japanese domestic market during the 2000s for use with high-definition digital broadcast and video output signals. However, despite this title, it only transmits analogue video signals.

Originally, YP_{B}P_{R} component video signals required three cables (with either RCA connectors for the consumer market or BNC connectors for the professional market). While this remained the standard in the rest of the world, in Japan, D-Terminal was created to be a single cable incorporating all these discrete signal lines. However, as with the previous component connection methods, D-Terminal does not carry audio and requires separate cables to transmit audio (often standard RCA cables). Since all YP_{B}P_{R} formats carry identical YP_{B}P_{R} component signals, a passive breakout cable can be used to connect a D-Terminal output to standard RCA or BNC connector inputs.

Additionally, the specification introduced identification signal lines that transmit the resolution (number of scan lines), scanning format (interlaced or progressive), and aspect ratio. The connector also includes dedicated pins for plug insertion detection.

The connector's 14 pins, arranged in two rows of seven, are allocated as follows:

- 2 for luminance (Y)
- 4 for colour-difference (P_{B}/P_{R})
- 3 for the resolution, scanning format, and aspect ratio identification signal lines
- 2 for plug insertion detection
- 3 for reserve lines

Since the three identification signal lines (lines 1–3) use shield ground, effectively there are 15 connection points.

== Specifications and compatibility ==
=== Resolution tiers ===
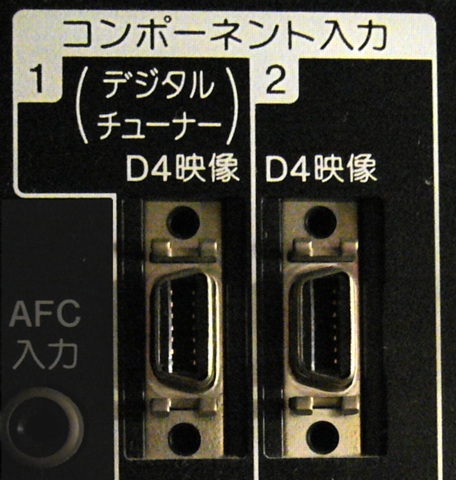
Two D4 tier D-Terminal video connectors. Both labelled "component video" and the first labelled for an ISDB digital tuner.

The JEITA CP-4120 format specification divides D-Terminal capabilities into distinct tiers based on scan line count and scan type. Higher-numbered tiers are backward-compatible with all lower-numbered tiers. However, a source device is only required to output the highest tier specified. For example, if a D4 device is connected to a display that only supports D1, it will output no signal unless it explicitly supports lower-numbered tiers.

D-Terminal resolution tiers
Tier	Format	Total lines	Active resolution	Scan type	Definition
D1	480i	525i	720 × 480	Interlaced	SD
D2	480p	525p	720 × 480	Progressive	SD
D3	1080i	1125i	1920 × 1080	Interlaced	HD
D4	720p	750p	1280 × 720	Progressive	HD
D5	1080p	1125p	1920 × 1080	Progressive	Full HD

The D3 tier serves the primary design goal of the connector, as 1080i was established as the standard format for high-definition digital broadcasts. This format was adopted in Japan as well, with the ARIB STD-B21 receiver specification explicitly recommending D-Terminal connections for digital broadcast reception.

=== Pins ===
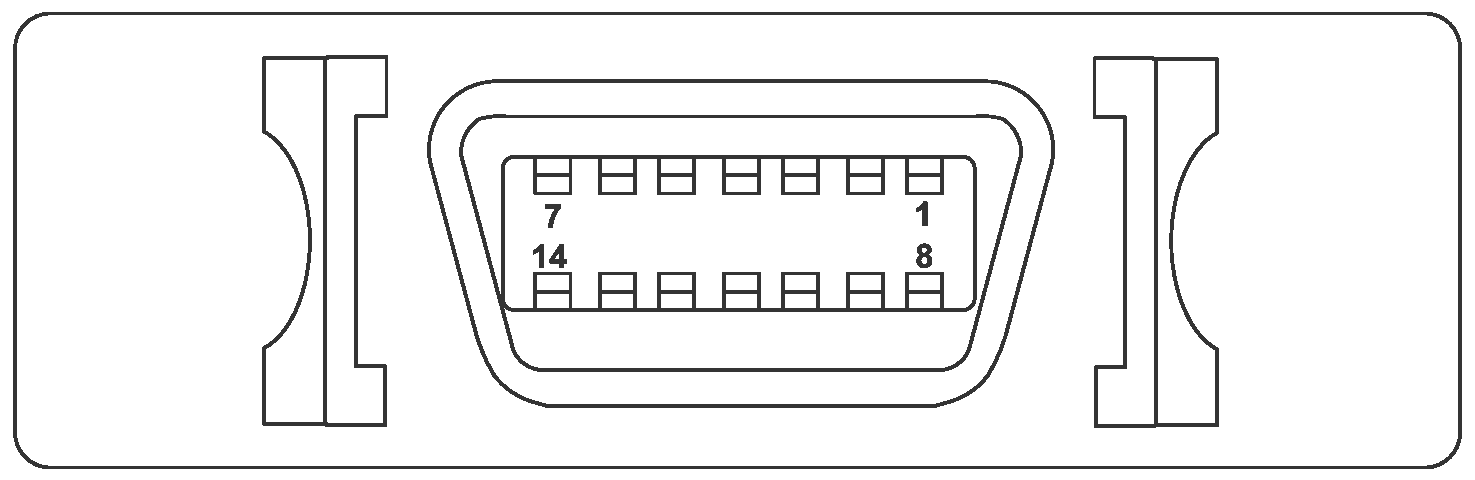
Female D-Terminal connector diagram

Pin layout
Pin	Signal	Pin	Signal
1	Y	8	Identification signal line 1, number of scan lines
2	Y, ground	9	Identification signal line 2, scanning format
3	P_{B}	10	Reserved line 2
4	P_{B}, ground	11	Identification signal line 3, aspect ratio
5	P_{R}	12	Plug insertion detection, ground
6	P_{R}, ground	13	Reserved line 3
7	Reserved line 1	14	Plug insertion detection
Tabs	Shield ground		

Identification signal lines
Voltage	Line 1 Total scan lines (active scan lines)	Line 2 Scanning format	Line 3 Aspect ratio
5V	1125 (1080)	Progressive	16:9
2.2V	750 (720)	Undefined	4:3
0V	525 (480)	Interlaced	4:3

=== Video game console compatibility ===
Several video game consoles released in Japan, including American Xbox consoles, support D-Terminal cables.

Video game console D-Terminal compatibility
Console	Model	Formats Supported	Notes	Ref.
GameCube	DOL-001	D1–2	D2 output is limited to supported games	
PlayStation 2	All models	D1–D3	Only SCPH-50000 and later models support D2 output for DVD-Video; D2-3 output is limited to supported games	
Xbox	All models	D1–D4	DVD-Video playback is restricted to D1 output; D2-4 output is limited to supported games	
Wii	All models	D1–D2		
PlayStation 3	All models	D1–D5		
Xbox 360	Launch; S	D2–D5	D5 output was added in an update; Model E only supports composite and HDMI	
Wii U	All models	D1–D2 (Wii spec); D3–D5 (Unverified)		
PlayStation Portable	2000; 3000; Go	D1–D2	At launch, PSP-2000 models could not output D1 and continued to require D2 output for PSP games; PSP-3000 and Go models also support D1 output for PSP games	

== Transition to HDMI and decline ==
While D-Terminal was widely used during early HD adoption, the lack of encryption on these signals due to their analogue nature led to content distributors and hardware manufacturers placing increasing restrictions on analogue HD output. This ultimately drove the widespread adoption of High-Definition Multimedia Interface (HDMI) by both the industry and consumers.

DVD players equipped with upscaling capabilities were restricted to a maximum of D2 (480p) output over component video, due to the terms of the Content Scramble System (CSS) and Content Protection for Recordable Media (CPRM) licences.

Additionally, HDMI came to support High-bandwidth Digital Content Protection (HDCP) and this was required for HD video disc (HD DVD and Blu-ray) playback, restricting the analogue output of those formats. Starting 1 January 2011, the Advanced Access Content System (AACS) licensing agreement mandated that all new HD video disc players restrict their analogue HD output to D1 (480i). Manufacturing of new Blu-ray players with analogue output ultimately ceased on 31 December 2013.

Driven by these restrictions, Japanese consumer electronics manufacturers ultimately phased out analogue outputs and inputs as a whole.

== See also ==
- Amphenol connector
- D-subminiature
- SCART
- EIAJ 8 pin connector
