= 2004 in video games =

2004 saw many sequels and prequels in video games, such as Madden NFL 2005, NBA Live 2005, ESPN NBA 2K5, Tony Hawk's Underground 2, WWE Smackdown! vs. Raw, Doom 3, Dragon Quest VIII, Gran Turismo 4, Grand Theft Auto: San Andreas, Half-Life 2, Halo 2, Metal Gear Solid 3: Snake Eater, Myst IV: Revelation, Ninja Gaiden, Pokémon FireRed/LeafGreen/Emerald, Pikmin 2, Everybody's Golf 4 (Hot Shots Golf Fore!), Prince of Persia: Warrior Within, and World of Warcraft. New intellectual properties included Fable, Far Cry, FlatOut, Killzone, Katamari Damacy, Monster Hunter, N, Red Dead Revolver, SingStar, and Sacred. The Nintendo DS was also launched that year, the first major console of the seventh generation.

The year has been retrospectively considered one of the best and most influential in video game history due to the release of numerous critically acclaimed, commercially successful and influential titles across all platforms and genres at the time. The year's best-selling video game was Grand Theft Auto: San Andreas. The year's most critically acclaimed titles were Dragon Quest VIII and Gran Turismo 4 in Japan, and Half-Life 2 and San Andreas in the West.

== Legend ==
Video game platforms
DS	Nintendo DS, DSiWare, iQue DS	GBA	Game Boy Advance, iQue GBA	GCN	GameCube
OSX	macOS	PS1	PlayStation 1	PS2	PlayStation 2
PSP	PlayStation Portable	WIN	Windows, all versions Windows 95 and up	XB	Xbox, Xbox Live Arcade

== Financial performance ==
In 2004, the total U.S. sales of video game hardware, software and accessories was 9.9 billion compared with 10 billion in 2003. Total software sales rose 8 percent over the previous year to 6.2 billion. Additionally, sales of portable software titles exceeded 1 billion for the first time. Hardware sales were down 27 percent for the year due in part to shortages during the holiday season and price reductions from all systems.

=== Best-selling video games ===
Worldwide

Best-selling video games worldwide in 2004
Rank	Title	Platform	Publisher	Sales			
Rank	Title	Platform	Publisher	Japan	USA	Europe	Worldwide
1	Grand Theft Auto: San Andreas	PS2	Rockstar Games	—N/a	5,144,214	1,750,000+	6,894,214+
2	Prince of Persia: Warrior Within	PS2, XB	Ubisoft	56,414	5,132,612	1,158,612	6,347,928+
3	Pokémon FireRed / LeafGreen	GBA	The Pokémon Company	2,392,005	2,367,431	Unknown	5,800,000
4	FIFA Football 2005		EA Sports	56,075	53,804+	Unknown	4,500,000
5	Halo 2	XB	Microsoft Game Studios	42,310	4,288,397	Unknown	4,330,707+
6	Madden NFL 2005	PS2, XB	EA Sports	3,705	4,274,243	Unknown	4,277,948+
7	Dragon Quest VIII	PS2	Square Enix	3,327,167	—N/a	—N/a	3,327,167
8	ESPN NFL 2K5	PS2	Take-Two Interactive	—N/a	2,632,393	—N/a	2,632,393
9	Pro Evolution Soccer 4 (Winning Eleven 8)	PS2	Konami	1,120,272	Unknown	1,500,000+	2,620,272+
10	Need For Speed: Underground 2	PS2, XB	Electronic Arts	—N/a	2,453,829	Unknown	2,453,829+

Japan

Best-selling video games in Japan in 2004
Rank	Title	Platform	Publisher	Genre	Sales
1	Dragon Quest VIII	PS2	Square Enix	Role-playing	3,327,167
2	Pokémon FireRed / LeafGreen	GBA	The Pokémon Company	Role-playing	2,392,005
3	Pokémon Ruby / Sapphire / Emerald	GBA	The Pokémon Company	Role-playing	1,670,000
4	Dragon Quest V	PS2	Square Enix	Role-playing	1,611,974
5	Pro Evolution Soccer 4 (Winning Eleven 8)	PS2	Konami	Sports	1,120,272
6	Samurai Warriors	PS2	Koei	Hack and slash	1,024,253
7	Fist of the North Star	PS2	Sammy Corporation	Pachislot	916,765
8	Metal Gear Solid 3: Snake Eater	PS2	Konami	Stealth	694,307
9	Gran Turismo 4	PS2	Sony	Racing simulation	663,543
10	Derby Stallion 04	PS2	Enterbrain	Simulation	603,815

United States

Best-selling video games in the United States in 2004 (NPD Group)
Rank	Title	Platform(s)	Publisher	Sales	Revenue	Inflation
1	Grand Theft Auto: San Andreas	PS2	Rockstar Games	5,144,214	$252,000,000	$430,000,000
2	Halo 2	XB	Microsoft Game Studios	4,288,397	$223,000,000	$380,000,000
3	Madden NFL 2005	PS2, XB, GCN	EA Sports	4,274,243	$209,000,000	$356,000,000
4	ESPN NFL 2K5	PS2, XB	Take-Two Interactive	2,632,393	$50,000,000	$85,000,000
5	Need For Speed: Underground 2	PS2, XB, GCN	Electronic Arts	2,453,829	$118,000,000	$201,000,000
6	Pokémon FireRed / LeafGreen	GBA	Nintendo	2,367,431	$76,000,000	$130,000,000
7	NBA Live 2005	PS2, XB	EA Sports	1,723,190	$57,000,000	$97,000,000
8	Spider-Man 2	PS2, GCN	Activision	1,569,251	$67,000,000	$114,000,000
9	ESPN NBA 2K5	PS2, XB	Take-Two Interactive	1,280,314	Unknown	
10	Star Wars: Battlefront	PS2, XB	LucasArts	1,224,927	Unknown	

PAL regions

Best-selling video games in PAL regions in 2004
Rank	United Kingdom			Australia	
Rank	Title	Platform(s)	Sales	Title	Platform
1	Grand Theft Auto: San Andreas	PS2	1,750,000	Grand Theft Auto: San Andreas	PS2
2	Prince of Persia: Warrior Within		Unknown	Halo 2	XB
3	Need For Speed: Underground 2		Unknown	Need For Speed: Underground 2	PS2
4	The Simpsons: Hit & Run		Unknown	The Simpsons: Hit & Run	PS2
5	Pro Evolution Soccer 4		Unknown	Need for Speed: Underground	PS2
6	Sonic Heroes		Unknown	Ratchet & Clank	PS2
7	Spider-Man 2		Unknown	V8 Supercars 2	PS2
8	Need for Speed: Underground		Unknown	SingStar	PS2
9	Halo 2	XB	Unknown	Grand Theft Auto: Twin Pack	XB
10	DRIV3R		Unknown	Gran Turismo 3: A-Spec	PS2

== Top-rated games ==
=== Critically acclaimed games ===
Famitsu

In Japan, the following video game releases in 2004 entered Famitsu magazine's "Platinum Hall of Fame" and received Famitsu scores of at least 36 out of 40.

Title	Platform	Publisher	Genre	Score (out of 40)
Dragon Quest VIII	PS2	Square Enix	Role-playing	39
Gran Turismo 4	PS2	Sony	Racing simulation	39
Grand Theft Auto: San Andreas	PS2	Capcom	Action-adventure	37
Metal Gear Solid 3: Snake Eater	PS2	Konami	Stealth	37
Kessen III	PS2	Koei	Real-time tactics	37
Onimusha 3: Demon Siege	PS2	Capcom	Hack and slash	36
Metal Gear Solid: The Twin Snakes	GCN	Konami	Stealth	36
Kirby & the Amazing Mirror	GBA	Nintendo	Metroidvania	36
Pikmin 2	GCN	Nintendo	Real-time strategy	36
WarioWare: Twisted!	GBA	Nintendo	Party	36
The Legend of Zelda: The Minish Cap	GBA	Nintendo	Action-adventure	36
Kingdom Hearts: Chain of Memories	GBA	Square Enix	Action role-playing	36
WarioWare: Touched!	DS	Nintendo	Party	36
FIFA Football 2005	PS2	Electronic Arts	Sports	36

Metacritic and GameRankings

In the West, Metacritic (MC) and GameRankings (GR) are aggregators of video game journalism reviews.

2004 games and expansions scoring at least 88/100 (MC) or 87.5% (GR)
Game	Publisher	Release date	Platform	MC score	GR score
Half-Life 2	Valve	November 16, 2004	WIN	96/100	95.48%
Grand Theft Auto: San Andreas	Rockstar Games	October 26, 2004	PS2	95/100	95.08%
Halo 2	Microsoft Game Studios	November 9, 2004	XB	95/100	94.57%
Burnout 3: Takedown	Electronic Arts	September 8, 2004	XB	94/100	93.06%
Burnout 3: Takedown	Electronic Arts	September 8, 2004	PS2	93/100	93.32%
Unreal Tournament 2004	Atari	March 16, 2004	WIN	93/100	92.57%
Tom Clancy's Splinter Cell: Pandora Tomorrow	Ubisoft	March 23, 2004	XB	93/100	92.37%
World of Warcraft	Blizzard Entertainment	November 23, 2004	WIN	93/100	91.89%
Ninja Gaiden	Tecmo	March 2, 2004	XB	91/100	92.54%
Metroid Prime 2: Echoes	Nintendo	November 15, 2004	GCN	92/100	91.87%
Rome: Total War	Activision	September 22, 2004	WIN	92/100	91.75%
ESPN NFL 2K5	Sega	July 20, 2004	XB	92/100	90.52%
Metal Gear Solid 3: Snake Eater	Konami	November 17, 2004	PS2	91/100	91.77%
Ratchet & Clank: Up Your Arsenal	Sony Computer Entertainment	November 3, 2004	PS2	91/100	91.54%
Pro Evolution Soccer 4	Konami	August 5, 2004	PS2	91/100	91.12%
Madden NFL 2005	EA Sports	August 9, 2004	PS2	91/100	90.33%
Madden NFL 2005	EA Sports	August 9, 2004	XB	91/100	89.5%
Tiger Woods PGA Tour 2005	EA Sports	September 20, 2004	WIN	91/100	88.24%
The Chronicles of Riddick: Escape from Butcher Bay – Developer's Cut	Vivendi Universal Games	December 3, 2004	WIN	90/100	90.95%
The Sims 2	Electronic Arts	September 14, 2004	WIN	90/100	90.76%
The Legend of Zelda: The Minish Cap	Nintendo	November 4, 2004	GBA	89/100	90.36%
Metroid: Zero Mission	Nintendo	February 9, 2004	GBA	89/100	90.19%
Pro Evolution Soccer 4	Konami	November 26, 2004	XB	90/100	90.11%
Dragon Quest VIII	Square Enix	November 27, 2004	PS2	89/100	90.05%
Madden NFL 2005	EA Sports	August 9, 2004	GCN	90/100	90%
Pikmin 2	Nintendo	April 29, 2004	GCN	90/100	89.44%
MVP Baseball 2004	EA Sports	March 9, 2004	PS2	90/100	88.89%
MVP Baseball 2004	EA Sports	March 9, 2004	XB	90/100	88.73%
Viewtiful Joe	Capcom	August 24, 2004	PS2	90/100	87.95%
Lumines: Puzzle Fusion	Bandai	December 12, 2004	PSP	89/100	89.93%
Counter-Strike: Source	Valve	November 1, 2004	WIN	88/100	89.71%
EVE Online: Exodus	CCP Games	November 17, 2004	WIN	N/A	89.62%
Gran Turismo 4	Sony Computer Entertainment	December 28, 2004	PS2	89/100	89.53%
NCAA Football 2005	EA Sports	July 15, 2004	PS2	88/100	89.45%
FirePower for Microsoft Combat Flight Simulator 3	Microsoft Game Studios	June 11, 2004	WIN	88/100	89.43%
Far Cry	Ubisoft	March 23, 2004	WIN	89/100	89.38%
Nancy Drew: Curse of Blackmoor Manor	DreamCatcher Interactive	October 5, 2004	WIN	81/100	89%
Football Manager 2005	Sega	November 5, 2004	WIN	89/100	88.81%
The Chronicles of Riddick: Escape from Butcher Bay	Vivendi Universal Games	June 1, 2004	XB	89/100	88.61%
NCAA Football 2005	EA Sports	July 15, 2004	XB	89/100	88.4%
MVP Baseball 2004	EA Sports	March 9, 2004	GCN	89/100	87.43%
Ridge Racer	Namco	December 12, 2004	PSP	88/100	88.62%
RalliSport Challenge 2	Microsoft Game Studios	May 4, 2004	XB	87/100	88.54%
Pro Evolution Soccer 4	Konami	December 3, 2004	WIN	88/100	88.5%
Out of the Park Baseball 6	Out of the Park Developments	June 14, 2004	WIN	87/100	88.4%
Sid Meier's Pirates!	Atari	November 22, 2004	WIN	88/100	88.34%
Paper Mario: The Thousand-Year Door	Nintendo	July 22, 2004	GCN	87/100	88.05%
NCAA Football 2005	EA Sports	July 15, 2004	GCN	88/100	88.01%
Sly 2: Band of Thieves	Sony Computer Entertainment	September 14, 2004	PS2	88/100	87.92%
Rise of Nations: Thrones and Patriots	Microsoft Game Studios	April 27, 2004	WIN	88/100	87.86%
WarioWare: Twisted!	Nintendo	October 14, 2004	GBA	88/100	87.79%
Tiger Woods PGA Tour 2005	EA Sports	September 20, 2004	GCN	88/100	87.68%
Tiger Woods PGA Tour 2005	EA Sports	September 20, 2004	PS2	88/100	87.08%
Tiger Woods PGA Tour 2005	EA Sports	September 20, 2004	XB	88/100	86.51%
ESPN NHL 2K5	Sega	August 30, 2004	XB	88/100	86.22%
Wings of Power: WWII Heavy Bombers and Jets	Tri Synergy	September 13, 2004	WIN	83/100	87.83%
NASCAR 2005: Chase for the Cup	EA Sports	September 4, 2004	GCN	N/A	87.61%

=== Top game rentals in the United States ===
Top video game rentals in the United States
Rank	Title	Publisher	Platform
1	Prince of Persia: Warrior Within	Ubisoft	PS2
2	Grand Theft Auto: San Andreas	Rockstar Games	PS2
3	DRIV3R	Atari	PS2
4	Dragon Ball Z: Budokai 2	Atari	PS2
5	Madden NFL 2005	EA Sports	PS2
6	NFL Street	EA Sports	PS2
7	Red Dead Revolver	Rockstar Games	PS2
8	James Bond 007: Everything or Nothing	EA Games	PS2
9	NCAA Football 2005	EA Sports	PS2
10	The Sims Bustin' Out	EA Games	PS2

== Major events ==
Date	Event	Ref.
January 12	Ubisoft acquires Tiwak.	
January 20	Wired's Vaporware Awards gives its first "Lifetime Achievement Award" to recurring winner Duke Nukem Forever.	
February	Electronic Arts consolidates, rolls most of Maxis and all of Origin Systems into its Redwood Shores, California HQ.	
March 4	Academy of Interactive Arts & Sciences hosts the 7th Annual Interactive Achievement Awards; inducts Peter Molyneux into the AIAS Hall of Fame.	
March 22–26	Game Developers Conference hosts 4th annual Game Developers Choice Awards and Gama Network's 6th annual Independent Games Festival (IGF).	
April 6	Midway Games acquires Surreal Software.	
April 13	T1, a South Korean esports organization, is founded.	
May 11	Nintendo officially announces its "Revolution" (later named Wii) console.	
May 11–13	The 10th annual E3 is held in Los Angeles, California, United States.	
May	Sammy Corporation buys a controlling share in Sega Corporation at a cost of1.1 billion creating the new company, Sega Sammy Holdings, one of the biggest video game companies in the world.	
July	IEMA (Interactive Entertainment Merchants Association) hosts 5th annual Executive Summit.	
July	Square Enix restructures executive branches around the world.	
August 1	A viral portion of a Street Fighter III: 3rd Strike match takes place during the Evo 2004 tournament.	
August 3	Doom 3 is released, restarting the breakthrough franchise, and featured complex graphics features such as unified lighting and shadowing, real-time fully dynamic per-pixel lighting and stencil shadowing. The game became id's best selling game to date.	
September 1	Acclaim declares bankruptcy and closes its doors.	
October 6–10	The 2004 World Cyber Games are held.	
October 11	Midway Games acquires Inevitable Entertainment and renames it Midway Studios Austin.	
October 12	EA Sports launches the multi-format FIFA Football 2005. It is the last major title to be released for the original PlayStation console.	
November 5	Nobuo Uematsu resigns from Square Enix and becomes a freelancer, starting his own business, called Smile Please Co., Ltd.	
November 30	Midway Games acquires developer Paradox Development.	
November	Counter-Strike: Source and Half-Life 2 are officially released on PC around the world, bringing in a new era for the first-person shooter genre of video games, with advanced graphics & physics.	
December 13	Electronic Arts purchases a 5-year exclusive agreement for the rights to the NFL, which includes NFL teams, stadiums and players for use in EA's football video games.	
December 14	The 2004 Spike Video Game Awards are held.	
December 20	Electronic Arts purchases 20% stake in Ubisoft. The purchase at the time was considered "hostile", by Ubisoft.	

== Notable deaths ==
- February 26 – Castle Wolfenstein creator Silas Warner dies at age 54.

== Hardware releases ==
The seventh generation of video game consoles began this year with the launch of the Nintendo DS and PlayStation Portable (only in Japan for the latter).

Additionally, Nokia released an updated version of their original N-Gage, called the N-Gage QD. Sony also released the PlayStation 2 slimline, a smaller revision model of the PlayStation 2.

As of 2026, the Nintendo DS is the best-selling handheld game console of all time and the 2nd best video game console overall (right behind the PlayStation 2).

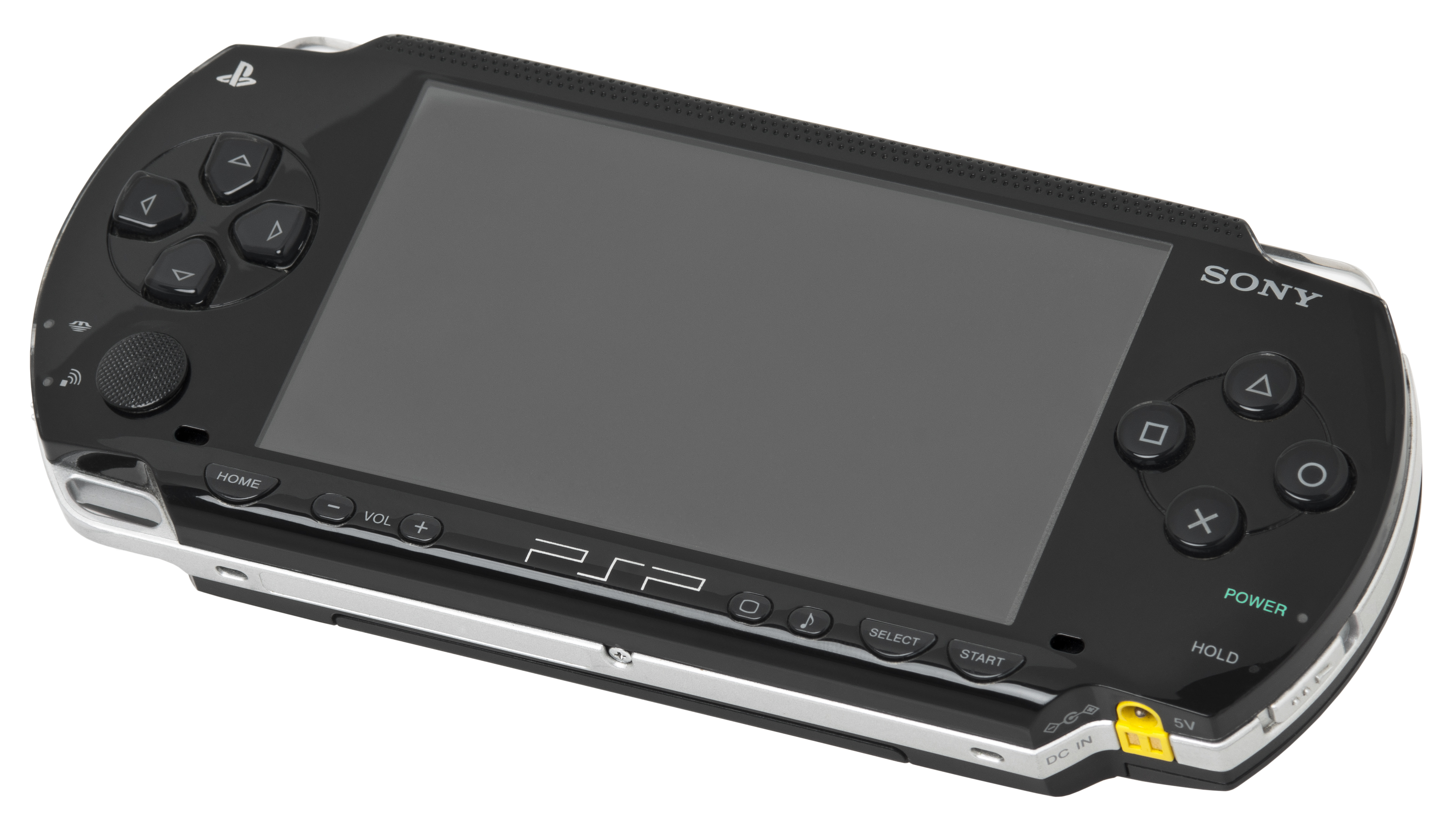
PlayStation Portable

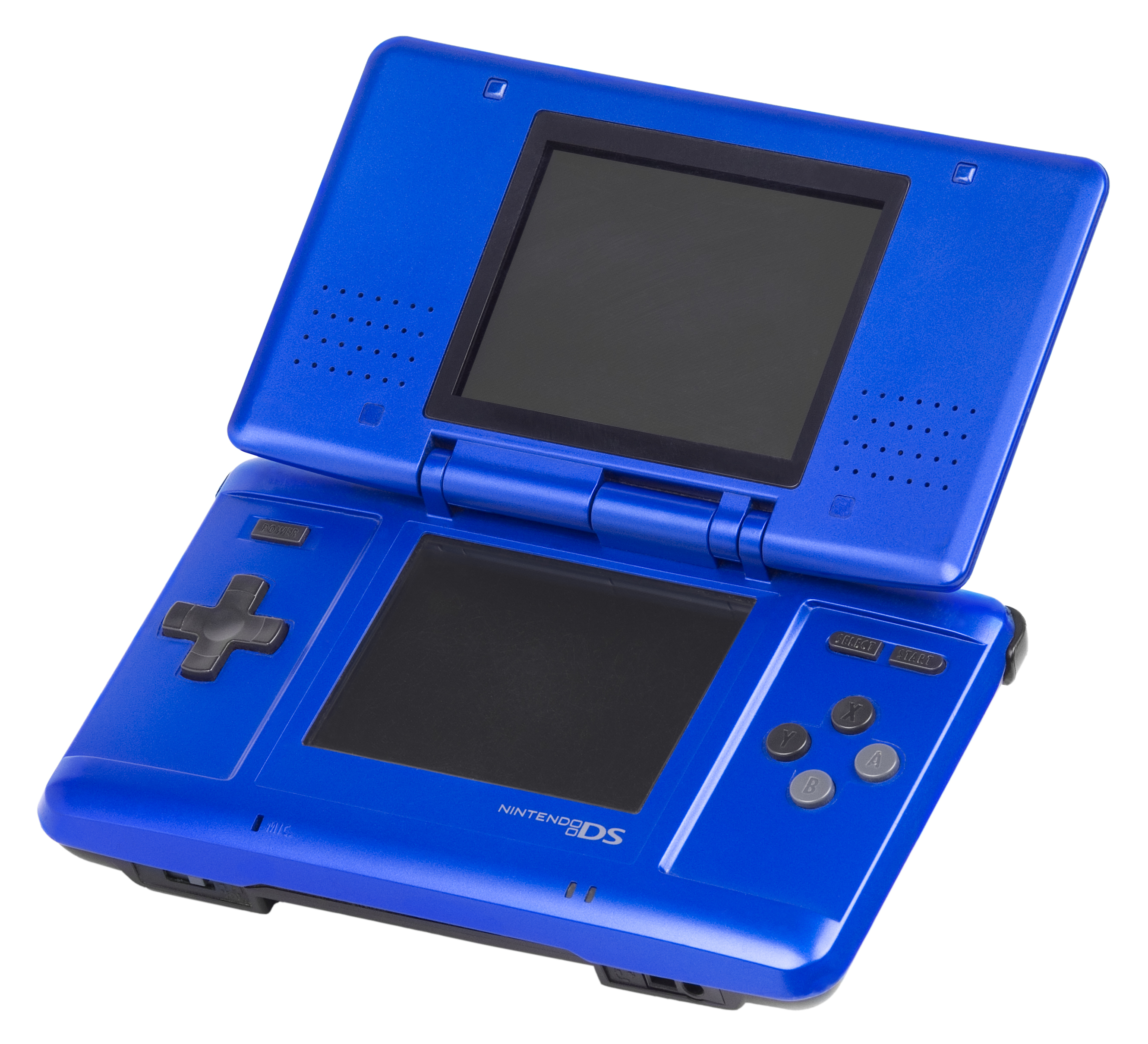
Nintendo DS

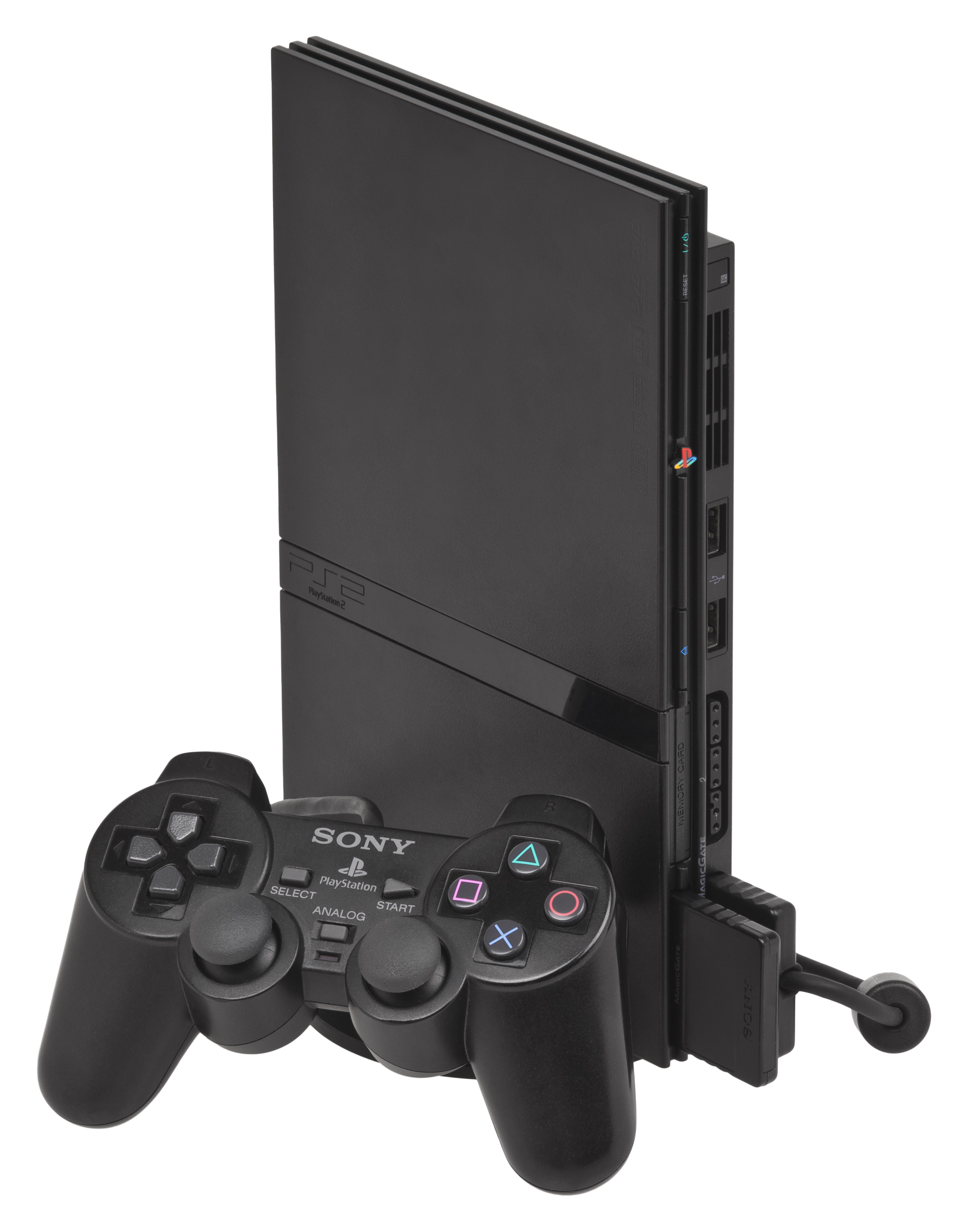
PlayStation 2 slimline

Date	System	Ref.
January 1	PlayStation 2^{CHN}	
October 29	PlayStation 2 slimline^{EU}	
November 1	PlayStation 2 (SCPH-70000)^{JP}	
November 3	PlayStation 2 slimline^{JP}	
November 17	Atari Flashback	
November 21	Nintendo DS^{NA}	
November 25	PlayStation 2 slimline^{NA}	
December 2	Nintendo DS^{JP}	
December 2	PlayStation 2 slimline^{AU}	
December 11	PlayStation Portable^{JP}	

== Games released in 2004 ==
Release date	Title	Platform	Genre	Ref.
January 5	Sonic Battle	GBA		
January 13	Fallout: Brotherhood of Steel	PS2, XB		
January 14	.hack//Quarantine Part 4	PS2		
January 20	Delta Force: Black Hawk Down – Team Sabre	WIN, PS2		
January 20	Maximo vs. Army of Zin	PS2		
January 28	Mafia: The City of Lost Heaven	PS2		
January 28	Vietcong: Fist Alpha	WIN, PS2, XB		
January 29	Pokémon FireRed and LeafGreen (JP)	GBA		
February	Cops 2170: The Power of Law (RU)	WIN		
February 2	R-Type Final	PS2		
February 9	EverQuest: Gates of Discord	WIN		
February 9	Final Fantasy Crystal Chronicles	GCN		
February 9	Metroid: Zero Mission	GBA		
February 10	Nightshade	PS2		
February 10	Unreal II: The Awakening	XB		
February 10	Wrath Unleashed	PS2, XB		
February 10	Yu-Gi-Oh! World Championship Tournament 2004	GBA		
February 11	Feeding Frenzy	WIN		
February 14	Bomberman (JP) (Note: Released as part of the Classic NES Series)	GBA		
February 14	Donkey Kong (JP)	GBA		
February 14	Excitebike (JP)	GBA		
February 14	Ice Climber (JP)	GBA		
February 14	The Legend of Zelda (JP)	GBA		
February 14	Mappy (JP)	GBA		
February 14	Pac-Man (JP)	GBA		
February 14	Star Soldier (JP)	GBA		
February 14	Super Mario Bros. (JP)	GBA		
February 14	Xevious (JP)	GBA		
February 17	James Bond 007: Everything or Nothing	GCN, PS2, XB		
February 17	Jet Li: Rise to Honor	PS2		
February 17	Pro Evolution Soccer 3	WIN, PS2		
February 24	Romance of the Three Kingdoms IX	PS2		
February 26	Kaido Battle 2: Chain Reaction	PS2		
February 27	Steel Battalion: Line of Contact	XB		
March 1	N	WIN, DS		
March 2	Drakengard	PS2		
March 2	Lifeline	PS2		
March 2	MTX Mototrax	PS2, XB		
March 2	Ninja Gaiden	XB		
March 2	Scooby Doo: Mystery Mayhem	GCN, PS2, XB, GBA		
March 4	Colin McRae Rally 04	WIN		
March 8	The Suffering	WIN, PS2, XB		
March 9	Firefighter F.D.18	PS2		
March 9	Metal Gear Solid: The Twin Snakes	GCN		
March 9	Tom Clancy's Rainbow Six 3: Athena Sword	WIN		
March 10	Tenchu: Wrath of Heaven	XB		
March 12	Seven Samurai 20XX	PS2		
March 14	Battlefield Vietnam	WIN		
March 15	Wade Hixton's Counter Punch	GBA		
March 16	Unreal Tournament 2004	WIN		
March 18	Mobile Suit Z Gundam: Hot Scramble (JP)	GBA		
March 19	Sacred (EU)	WIN		
March 23	All-Star Baseball 2005	XB		
March 23	Counter-Strike: Condition Zero	WIN		
March 23	Far Cry	WIN		
March 23	Final Fantasy XI (US)	PS2		
March 23	Mission: Impossible – Operation Surma	GCN		
March 23	Sonic Heroes	WIN, GCN, PS2, XB		
March 24	Samurai Jack: The Shadow of Aku	GCN, PS2		
March 25	Sacred (NA)	WIN		
March 26	Tom Clancy's Splinter Cell: Pandora Tomorrow	WIN, GCN, PS2, XB		
March 31	Resident Evil Outbreak	PS2		
April	.kkrieger	WIN		
April 1	Destruction Derby Arenas	PS2		
April 5	Alias	WIN, PS2, XB		
April 5	Fight Night 2004	PS2, XB		
April 8	All-Star Baseball 2005	PS2		
April 12	Painkiller	WIN		
April 12	Serious Sam Advance	GBA		
April 13	TOCA Race Driver 2	WIN, XB		
April 20	Hitman: Contracts	WIN, PS2, XB		
April 20	Manhunt	WIN, XB		
April 27	Beyond Divinity	WIN		
April 27	Rise of Nations: Thrones and Patriots	WIN		
April 28	City of Heroes	WIN, OSX		
May 4	Rallisport Challenge 2	XB		
May 4	Red Dead Revolver	PS2, XB		
May 6	Samurai Warriors	PS2		
May 7	Future Tactics: The Uprising	GCN, PS2, XB		
May 21	Adventure Island (JP)	GBA		
May 21	Balloon Fight (JP)	GBA		
May 21	Clu Clu Land (JP)	GBA		
May 21	Dig Dug (JP)	GBA		
May 21	Dr. Mario (JP)	GBA		
May 21	Ganbare Goemon! Karakuri Dōchū (JP)	GBA		
May 21	Ghosts 'n Goblins (JP)	GBA		
May 21	Mario Bros. (JP)	GBA		
May 21	TwinBee (JP)	GBA		
May 21	Way of the Samurai 2	PS2		
May 21	Wrecking Crew (JP)	GBA		
May 24	Mario vs. Donkey Kong	GBA		
May 25	Harry Potter and the Prisoner of Azkaban	WIN, PS2, XB, GCN, GBA		
May 25	Metal Slug 3	XB		
May 25	Thief: Deadly Shadows	WIN, XB		
June 1	The Chronicles of Riddick: Escape from Butcher Bay	XB		
June 1	Half-Life: Source	WIN		
June 7	Bomberman (NA)	GBA		
June 7	Donkey Kong (NA)	GBA		
June 7	Excitebike (NA)	GBA		
June 7	Ice Climber (NA)	GBA		
June 7	The Legend of Zelda (NA)	GBA		
June 7	The Legend of Zelda: Four Swords Adventures	GCN		
June 7	Pac-Man (NA)	GBA		
June 7	Sonic Advance 3	GBA		
June 7	Super Mario Bros. (NA)	GBA		
June 7	Xevious (NA)	GBA		
June 8	Ribbit King	GCN, PS2		
June 14	Psi-Ops: The Mindgate Conspiracy	WIN, PS2, XB		
June 15	Front Mission 4	PS2		
June 15	Joint Operations: Typhoon Rising	WIN		
June 21	Driver 3	PS2, XB		
June 22	Dragon Ball Z: Supersonic Warriors	GBA		
June 23	Mega Man Anniversary Collection	GCN, PS2, GBA		
June 24	The Legend of Heroes: Trails in the Sky (JP)	WIN		
June 27	Mega Man Battle Network 4	GBA		
June 29	CT Special Forces 2: Back in the Trenches	GBA		
June 29	Spider-Man 2 (US)	WIN		
July 2	Yu-Gi-Oh! Power of Chaos: Joey the Passion	WIN		
July 5	Around the World in 80 Days	GBA		
July 9	Bomberman (PAL)	GBA		
July 9	Donkey Kong (PAL)	GBA		
July 9	Excitebike (PAL)	GBA		
July 9	Ice Climber (PAL)	GBA		
July 9	The Legend of Zelda (PAL)	GBA		
July 9	Pac-Man (PAL)	GBA		
July 9	Richard Burns Rally	WIN, PS2, XB		
July 9	Spider-Man 2 (EU)	WIN		
July 9	Super Mario Bros. (PAL)	GBA		
July 9	Xevious (PAL)	GBA		
July 13	Tales of Symphonia	GCN		
July 14	Athens 2004	PS2		
July 15	Shin Megami Tensei: Digital Devil Saga	PS2		
July 20	Catwoman	WIN, GCN, PS2, XB, GBA		
July 20	Puyo Pop Fever	GCN		
July 20	Sudeki	XB		
July 21	Crimson Tears	PS2		
July 22	Bujingai	PS2		
July 29	Final Fantasy I & II: Dawn of Souls	GBA		
July 29	Mega Man X: Command Mission	GCN, PS2		
August 1	NFL GameDay 2005	PS1		
August 3	Doom 3	WIN		
August 5	Cartoon Network: Block Party	GBA		
August 10	Castlevania (JP)	GBA		
August 10	Famicom Detective Club: The Girl Who Stands Behind (JP)	GBA		
August 10	Famicom Detective Club: The Missing Heir (JP)	GBA		
August 10	Kid Icarus (JP)	GBA		
August 10	Metroid (JP)	GBA		
August 10	The Mysterious Murasame Castle (JP)	GBA		
August 10	SD Gundam World: Gachapon Senshi - Scramble Wars (JP)	GBA		
August 10	Shin Onigashima (JP)	GBA		
August 10	Super Mario Bros.: The Lost Levels (JP)	GBA		
August 10	Zelda II: The Adventure of Link (JP)	GBA		
August 18	Astro Boy: Omega Factor	GBA		
August 24	Crazy Bus			
August 24	Starsky & Hutch	GCN		
August 24	Viewtiful Joe	PS2		
August 25	Amazing Island	GCN		
August 27	Headhunter Redemption (EU)	PS2, XB		
August 30	Nancy Drew: The Secret of Shadow Ranch	WIN		
August 30	Pikmin 2	GCN		
August 30	WWE Day of Reckoning	GCN		
August 31	Street Racing Syndicate	GCN, PS2, XB		
September 2	Terminator 3: The Redemption	PS2, XB		
September 3	Digimon Rumble Arena 2	PS2, XB		
September 6	Digimon Rumble Arena 2	GCN		
September 7	Burnout 3: Takedown	PS2, XB		
September 7	Silent Hill 4: The Room	WIN, PS2, XB		
September 8	Carmen Sandiego: The Secret of the Stolen Drums	PS2		
September 8	The Fairly OddParents: Shadow Showdown	WIN, GCN, PS2, GBA		
September 9	King of Colosseum II	PS2		
September 9	Pokémon FireRed and LeafGreen (NA)	GBA		
September 12	Barbie as the Princess and the Pauper	GBA		
September 13	The Adventures of Jimmy Neutron Boy Genius: Attack of the Twonkies	GCN, PS2, GBA		
September 13	Carmen Sandiego: The Secret of the Stolen Drums	GCN, XB		
September 13	Digimon Racing	GBA		
September 13	EverQuest: Omens of War	WIN		
September 14	Advance Guardian Heroes	GBA		
September 14	Bad Boys: Miami Takedown	GCN, PS2, XB		
September 14	Call of Duty: United Offensive	WIN		
September 14	Fable	XB		
September 14	Gradius V	PS2		
September 14	Power Rangers Dino Thunder	GCN, PS2, XB, GBA		
September 14	The Sims 2	WIN		
September 14	Sly 2: Band of Thieves	PS2		
September 16	Pokémon Emerald (JP)	GBA		
September 17	Crisis Zone	PS2		
September 20	Def Jam: Fight for NY	GCN, PS2, XB		
September 20	F-Zero: GP Legend	GBA		
September 20	Warhammer 40,000: Dawn of War	WIN		
September 21	Blood Will Tell	PS2		
September 21	Dance Dance Revolution Extreme	PS2		
September 21	Final Fantasy XI: Chains of Promathia	WIN, PS2		
September 21	Headhunter Redemption (NA)	PS2, XB		
September 21	Second Sight	GCN, PS2, XB		
September 21	Star Wars Trilogy: Apprentice of the Force	GBA		
September 21	Star Wars: Battlefront	WIN, PS2, XB		
September 22	Disney's Kim Possible 2: Drakken's Demise	GBA		
September 22	Katamari Damacy	PS2		
September 22	Rome: Total War	WIN		
September 27	Shadow Hearts: Covenant	PS2		
September 27	Shark Tale	WIN, GCN, PS2, XB, GBA		
September 28	Armored Core: Nexus	PS2		
September 28	Crash Twinsanity	PS2, XB		
September 28	Myst IV: Revelation	WIN		
October 1	Kult: Heretic Kingdoms	WIN, OSX		
October 1	Scaler	GCN, PS2, XB		
October 4	Mortal Kombat: Deception	PS2		
October 4	Tony Hawk's Underground 2	WIN, GCN, PS2, XB, GBA		
October 5	Conflict: Vietnam	WIN, PS2, XB		
October 5	Leisure Suit Larry: Magna Cum Laude	WIN, PS2, XB		
October 5	Mega Man Zero 3	GBA		
October 5	Nancy Drew: Curse of Blackmoor Manor	WIN		
October 5	Syberia II	XB		
October 5	TOCA Race Driver 2	PS2		
October 5	Tribes: Vengeance	WIN		
October 11	Paper Mario: The Thousand-Year Door	GCN		
October 14	BloodRayne 2	PS2		
October 14	FIFA Football 2005	WIN, GCN, PS1, PS2, GBA, PSP		
October 14	Lilo & Stitch 2: Hämsterviel Havoc	GBA		
October 14	Shin Megami Tensei: Nocturne	PS2		
October 14	Tak 2: The Staff of Dreams	GCN, PS2, XB, GBA		
October 14	Under the Skin	PS2		
October 18	Kirby & the Amazing Mirror	GBA		
October 19	All Grown Up!: Express Yourself	PS2, GCN, GBA		
October 19	Boktai 2: Solar Boy Django	GBA		
October 19	Neo Contra	PS2		
October 19	Teenage Mutant Ninja Turtles 2: Battle Nexus	WIN, GCN, PS2, XB, GBA		
October 20	Ape Escape: Pumped & Primed	PS2		
October 20	Tron 2.0	GBA		
October 22	Sacred Plus (EU)	WIN		
October 25	Ace Combat 5: The Unsung War	PS2		
October 25	Castlevania (NA)	GBA		
October 25	Dr. Mario (NA)	GBA		
October 25	Metroid (NA)	GBA		
October 25	OutRun 2	XB		
October 25	Zelda II: The Adventure of Link (NA)	GBA		
October 26	The Bard's Tale	PS2, XB		
October 26	Dead or Alive Ultimate	XB		
October 26	Grand Theft Auto Advance	GBA		
October 26	Grand Theft Auto: San Andreas	PS2		
October 26	Star Wars Galaxies: Jump to Lightspeed	WIN		
October 26	Yu-Gi-Oh! Destiny Board Traveler	GBA		
October 27	The Nightmare of Druaga: Fushigino Dungeon	PS2		
October 27	The SpongeBob SquarePants Movie	WIN, GCN, PS2, XB, GBA		
October 28	Mario Power Tennis (JP)	GCN		
October 29	The Incredibles	WIN		
November 1	Counter-Strike: Source	WIN		
November 2	Codename: Kids Next Door – Operation: S.O.D.A.	GBA		
November 2	Godzilla: Save the Earth	PS2, XB		
November 2	Killzone	PS2		
November 2	The Lord of the Rings: The Third Age	GCN, PS2, XB, GBA		
November 2	Medal of Honor: Pacific Assault	WIN		
November 2	Ratchet & Clank: Up Your Arsenal	PS2		
November 2	RollerCoaster Tycoon 3	WIN		
November 3	The Incredibles: When Danger Calls	WIN		
November 3	Spyro: A Hero's Tail	GCN, PS2, XB		
November 4	Godzilla: Save the Earth	PS2, XB		
November 4	The Legend of Zelda: The Minish Cap (JP)	GBA		
November 5	Bejeweled 2	WIN		
November 5	FlatOut (EU)	WIN, XB		
November 8	EverQuest II	WIN		
November 8	Mario Power Tennis (NA)	GCN		
November 9	EyeToy: AntiGrav	PS2		
November 9	Halo 2	XB		
November 9	Jak 3	PS2		
November 9	Shaman King: Master of Spirits	GBA		
November 9	Shaman King: Power of Spirit	PS2		
November 10	Hot Wheels: Stunt Track Challenge	PS2, XB, GBA		
November 10	Lemony Snicket's A Series of Unfortunate Events	WIN, GCN, PS2, XB, GBA, DS		
November 12	Sabotain: Break the Rules	WIN		
November 15	Donkey Kong Country 2: Diddy's Kong Quest	GBA		
November 15	Metroid Prime 2: Echoes	GCN		
November 15	MTX Mototrax	WIN		
November 15	Need for Speed: Underground 2	WIN, GCN, PS2, XB, GBA, DS		
November 16	Dragon Ball Z: Budokai 3	PS2		
November 16	Feel the Magic: XY/XX	DS		
November 16	Fight Club	PS2, XB		
November 16	Half-Life 2	WIN		
November 16	Joint Operations: Escalation	WIN		
November 16	Vampire: The Masquerade – Bloodlines	WIN		
November 17	Asphalt Urban GT	DS		
November 17	Castle Shikigami 2	PS2		
November 17	Forgotten Realms: Demon Stone	XB		
November 17	King Arthur	PS2		
November 17	Metal Gear Solid 3: Snake Eater	PS2		
November 17	Pac-Man World	GBA		
November 18	Baten Kaitos: Eternal Wings and the Lost Ocean	GCN		
November 18	Blinx 2: Masters of Time and Space	XB		
November 18	Dragon Ball: Advanced Adventure	GBA		
November 18	Yu Yu Hakusho: Tournament Tactics	GBA		
November 19	Mario vs. Donkey Kong	GBA		
November 21	Metroid Prime Hunters: First Hunt	DS		
November 21	Spider-Man 2	DS		
November 21	Super Mario 64 DS	DS		
November 22	GoldenEye: Rogue Agent	GCN, PS2, XB, DS		
November 22	JFK Reloaded	WIN		
November 23	Alien Hominid	GCN		
November 23	World of Warcraft	WIN		
November 30	Armies of Exigo	WIN		
November 30	Half-Life 2: Deathmatch	WIN		
November 30	Mr. Driller Drill Spirits	DS		
December 1	Painkiller: Battle out of Hell	WIN		
December 1	Scrapland	WIN		
December 1	Top Gun: Combat Zones	GBA		
December 2	Metal Slug Advance	GBA		
December 2	Prince of Persia: Warrior Within	WIN, GCN, PS2, XB		
December 6	The Lord of the Rings: The Battle for Middle-earth	WIN		
December 6	Mario Party 6	GCN		
December 6	Star Wars: Knights of the Old Republic II The Sith Lords	WIN, XB		
December 7	Growlanser Generations	PS2		
December 7	It's Mr. Pants	GBA		
December 7	Kingdom Hearts: Chain of Memories	GBA		
December 7	Kuon	PS2		
December 7	Mega Man X8	PS2		
December 7	Ridge Racer DS	DS		
December 8	The Chronicles of Riddick: Escape from Butcher Bay	WIN		
December 8	Sprung	DS		
December 8	Viewtiful Joe 2	PS2		
December 14	Gungriffon Allied Strike	XB		
December 15	Dragon Ball Z: Budokai 2	GCN		
December 16	2nd Super Robot Wars (JP)	GBA		
December 20	Cave Story	WIN		
December 22	NFL Street 2	GCN, PS2, XB		
December 28	Gran Turismo 4	PS2		

== See also ==
- 2004 in games
