= PlayStation models =

List of models of Sony's PlayStation

Japanese launch model PlayStation, SCPH-1000, shown with the original controller and memory card

Sony produced several models of the PlayStation (PS1) video game console from 1994 to 2006. Most revisions of the PlayStation addressed known hardware issues or aimed to lower manufacturing costs and time. External changes were minor, for example, the removal of external I/O ports, until the introduction of the miniaturised "PS one" console revision.

The final digit in the model number represents the region code of the console. Model numbers ending in '0' (e.g. SCPH-xxx0) were released in Japan (NTSC-J). Models ending in '1' denote North America (NTSC-U/C). Models ending in '2' signify PAL regions including Europe and Australia. Finally, '3' indicates Asia outside of Japan. Game discs are region-locked, only working in consoles from the matching region. Although minimal in textual content, the system language is Japanese for Japanese consoles and English for other region units.

== Revisions of standard PlayStation hardware ==
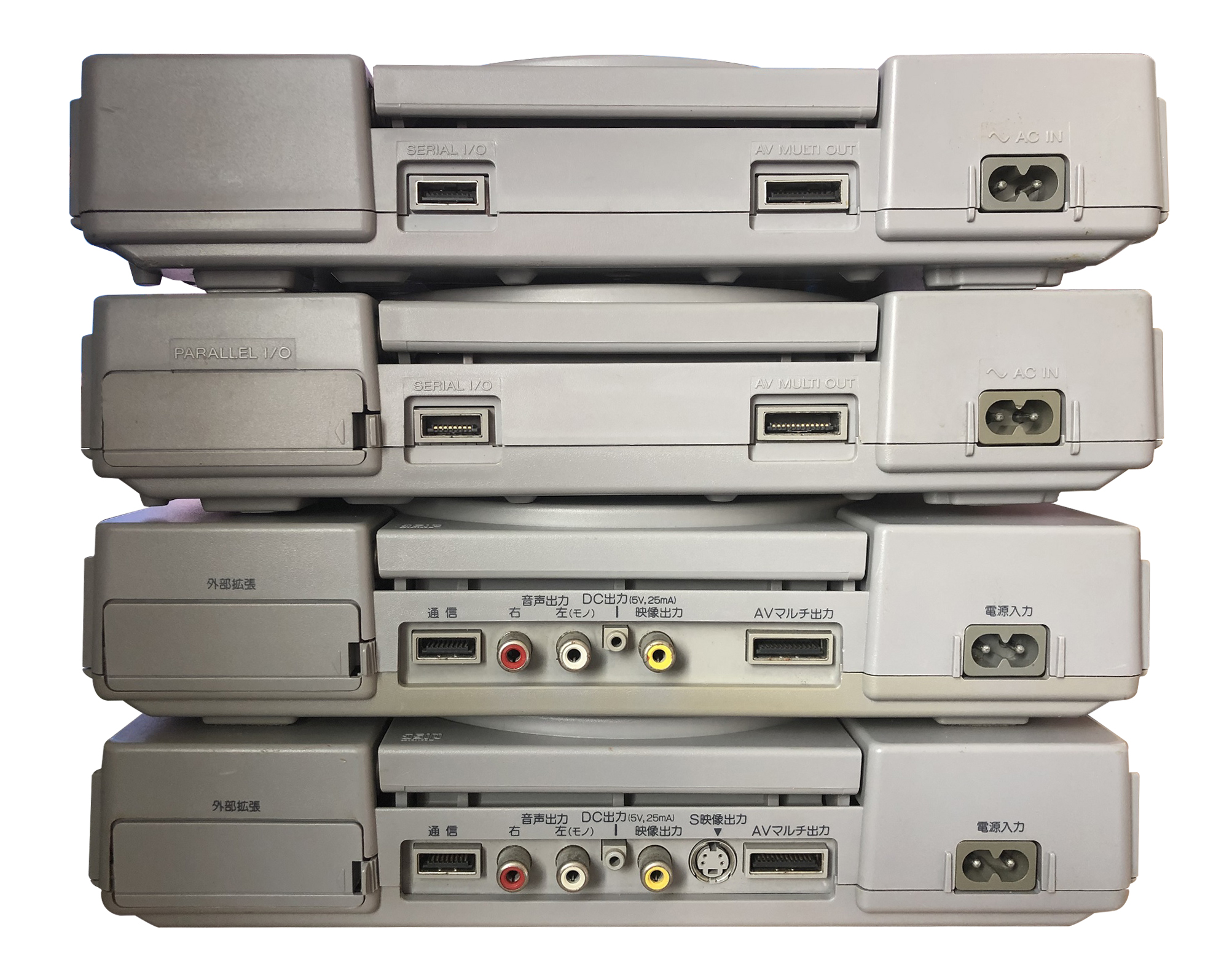
A bottom-up comparison of the SCPH-1000, SCPH-3000, SCPH-5501, and SCPH-9001. The SCPH-900x revision saw the removal of the parallel I/O port while the RCA connectors were removed in the SCPH-550x revision and the S-Video port was removed in the SCPH-1001 revision.

The original Japanese launch model (SCPH-1000), released on 3 December 1994, was the only model to feature an S-Video port. All subsequent models removed the S-Video port and incorporated revised internals. This led to a discrepancy in model numbers between Japanese units and launch units in other regions. The part numbers of launch units released in the US and Europe used the same numbering (SCPH-100x) as the Japanese launch units, but had different hardware (Rev. B silicon and no S-Video port). The hardware was equivalent to the revised Japanese SCPH-3000 model; had their numbering been consistent, they would have been SCPH-3001 and SCPH-3002. Inconsistent numbering was also used for Net Yaroze machines, which were based on SCPH-5000 and later 1001/1002 hardware, but numbered DTL-H3000, DTL-H3001, and DTL-H3002.

Early machines were known for having issues with their CD drives. The original optical pickup sled (KSM-440AAM) was made of thermoplastic and positioned too close to the power supply. This caused uneven wear, which made the laser misalign with the disc surface. Later, the KSM-440ACM drives solved this problem by using a die-cast sled with hard nylon inserts.

The original hardware design used dual-ported VRAM for graphics memory. However, due to a parts shortage, Sony redesigned the GPU to use SGRAM, which could simulate dual-porting by utilizing two banks. At the same time, the GPU was upgraded to support smoother shading, improving image quality compared to earlier models that were more prone to banding. Transparency effects were also enhanced, reducing slowdowns in scenes that heavily used them. This updated Rev. C hardware was introduced in late 1995. Unlike in Japan, the revision didn't receive a model number change in NTSC-U/C and PAL regions. Both SCPH-1001 and SCPH-1002 systems could have either revision, as the change occurred between revisions of the PU-8 mainboard.

The PAL region consoles from SCPH-1002 up to SCPH-5552 were different from the systems released in other regions in that they had a different menu design; a grey blocked background with square icons for the Memory Card (an icon showing a PlayStation with 2 memory cards inserted) and CD player (an icon with musical keyboards) menus. The CD player also included reverberation effects unique to those systems until the release of the PS one in 2000, which featured a slightly modified version of the BIOS.

With the release of the SCPH-5000/5003 series being produced only in Japan and Asia, it followed the same exterior design as the Japanese SCPH-3000/3500 series, its only differences being that it was switched to Rev. C hardware (same as late 1001/1002 units) with some upgrades to flawed components from previous models and a reduced retail price. This was followed by the first major consolidation, SCPH-550x/5001 and PAL-exclusive SCPH-5552 units, released in April 1997. This model further addressed the reliability issues with the disc drive assembly by placing the drive further away from the power supply in order to reduce heat; the chipset was also redesigned to use digital servo for focus/tracking and also to auto-calibrate the drive, as opposed to manual gain/bias calibration on earlier models. Also, shielding and PSU wiring were simplified, and from the SCPH-5001 on the RCA jacks and RFU power connectors were removed from the rear panel and the printed text on the back was changed to reliefs of the same. Starting with the SCPH-550x series, PAL variants had the "power" and "open" buttons changed from text to symbols, something that would later appear on the redesigned PS one. Originally, the PlayStation was supposed to have provision on Video CD support, but this feature was only included on the Asian exclusive SCPH-5903 model.

These were followed by the SCPH-700x and SCPH-750x series, released in April 1998. They are externally identical to the SCPH-500x machines, but have internal changes made to reduce manufacturing costs (for example, the system RAM went from 4 chips to 1, and the CD controller went from 3 chips to 1). In addition, a slight change of the start-up screen was made; the diamond remains unchanged but the font used for Sony Computer and Entertainment is now consistent, making the words appear smaller than the diamond overall, and the trademark symbol ™ is now placed after "Computer Entertainment" instead of after the diamond, as it was on the earlier models. New to the SCPH-700x series was the introduction of the "Sound Scope" – light show music visualizations. These were accessible by pressing the Select button while playing any normal audio CD in the system's CD player. While watching these visualizations, players could also add various effects like color cycling or motion blur and can save/load their memory card. These were seen on the SCPH-700x, 750x, 900x, and PS one models.

The final revision to the original PlayStation was the SCPH-900x series, released in May 1999. These had the same hardware as the SCPH-750x models, except the parallel port was removed and the size of the PCB is further reduced. The removal of the parallel port is partially due to the fact that Sony did not release an official, consumer-facing add-on for it; it was used for cheat cartridges and software development hardware, and for the parallel port to defeat the regional lockouts and copy protection. The PlayStation Link Cable connection was supported by only a handful of games. The SCPH-900x was the last model to support it, as the Serial I/O port was removed on all PS one models.

The PS one, released on 7 July 2000, was originally based on essentially the same hardware as the SCPH-900x; the serial port was removed, the controller/memory card ports moved to the main PCB and the internal power supply replaced with an external 7.5VDC power adapter with the other required power rails being generated internally on the main using a mixture of regulators and DC/DC converters for the various rails. It also incorporated a slightly modified version of the menu design previously used only on PAL consoles. The later revision (still designated as SCPH-10x but with a different PM-41(2) main circuit board) was functionally identical, but reduced manufacturing cost for a last time by moving to more highly integrated chips, namely the replacement of external RAM with on-chip RAM, which both reduced the parts count and allowed the use of smaller and cheaper packages by reducing the number of pins required.

== Debugging units ==
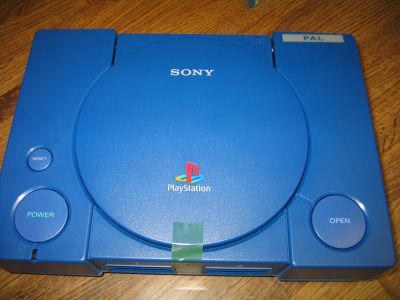
Debugging station PlayStation (PAL)

There were also debugging consoles - these were generally in either blue or green cases, although there were some special production units (mostly intended for use as show demo units) that were grey, the same as the retail consoles. The debug units were designed to be as close as possible to retail consoles, so they only had 2 MB of RAM (the developer boards had 8MB) and had standard retail boot ROMs. The only real difference is that the CD controller was reprogrammed so that it would identify any disc that had a data track as being "licensed", rather than requiring the region code in the lead-in that was present on pressed PlayStation CDs. This was done to allow developers to burn games to CD for testing. A side-effect of this was that most debug consoles would also boot discs from other regions (one notable exception being the later NTSC-J debugs, which only boot Japanese titles), although this was not officially supported. Sony made specific debug consoles for each region, and the TRC (technical requirement checklist) provided by Sony for each region required testing the title on the correct debug stations.

The reason for the two different case colors was a hardware change that Sony had made fairly early in the PlayStation production cycle - the original machines were built using Rev. A (early Japan market units) or Rev. B (later Japan units, US and Europe) hardware, both using the same GPU with VRAM to store the video data. Later models used Rev. C silicon and SGRAM - although the two chipsets had very similar performance, and Rev. C was explicitly designed with compatibility in mind, they were not identical - the Rev. C version was significantly faster at doing alpha blending, and hence the PS "semitransparent" writing mode - it was also rather slow at certain screen memory block moves (basically, ones involving narrow vertical strips of the display) on top of this there were some minor hardware bugs in the older silicon that had been addressed by including workarounds for them in the libraries - the later library versions checked the GPU type at startup time and disabled the patches if they were not needed. Because this made the two machine types quite significantly different from each other, the developer had to test the title on both machines before submitting. The blue debugs (DTL-H100x, DTL-H110x) had the old silicon and the green ones (DTL-H120x) had the new silicon.

== Net Yaroze ==
In 1997, Sony released a version of the PlayStation called the Net Yaroze. It was more expensive than the regular PlayStation ($750 instead of $299 for the original PlayStation) and also harder to obtain as it only came via mail order. It had a matte black finish instead of the usual gray, and most importantly, came with tools and instructions that allowed a user to program PlayStation games and applications without the need for a full development unit, which cost around $5,000 at the time. The Net Yaroze lacked many of the features the full developer suite provided to licensed developers, such as on-demand support and code libraries. Programmers were also limited by the 2 MB of total game space that the Net Yaroze allowed, which was otherwise not an issue for games like Ridge Racer that ran entirely from the system RAM (except for the streamed music tracks). It was unique in that it was the only officially retailed PlayStation with no regional lockout; it would play games from any territory. It would not however play CD-R discs, so it was not possible to create self-booting Yaroze games without a modified PlayStation.

== PS One ==
PS One

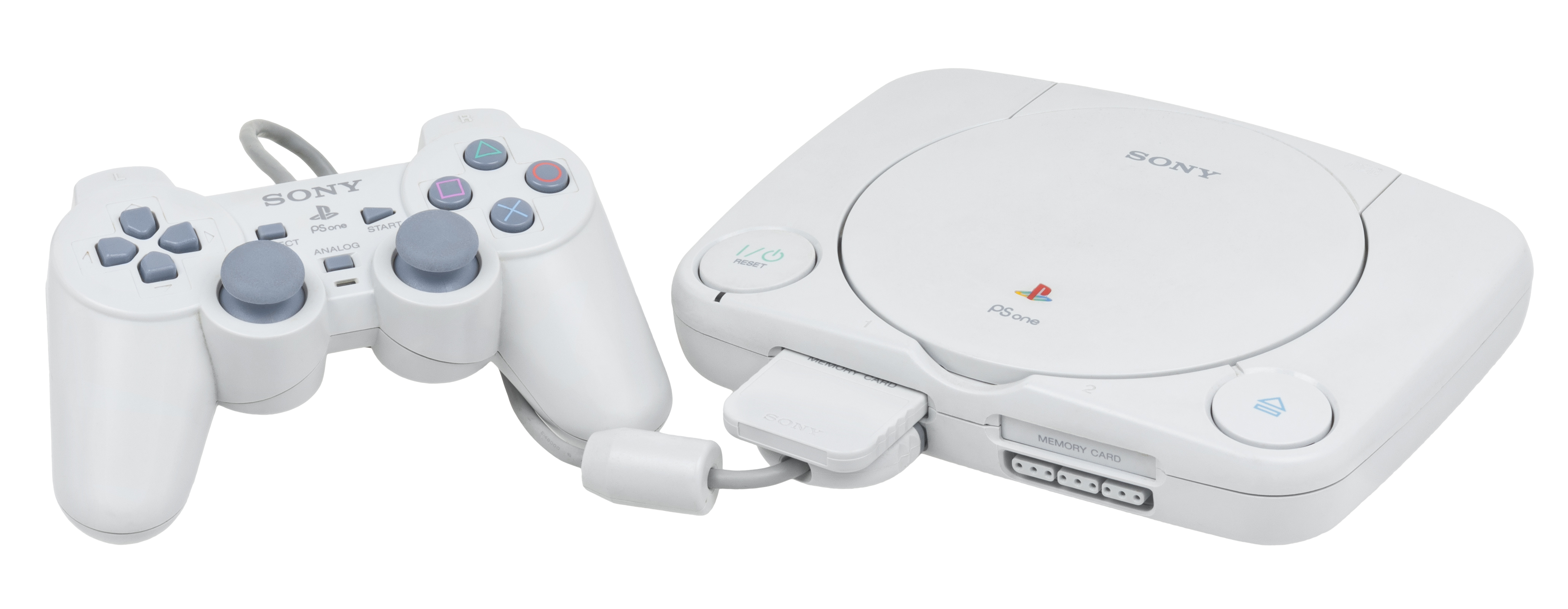
- Developer: Sony Computer Entertainment
- Manufacturer: Sony
- Product family: PlayStation
- Type: Home video game console
- Generation: Fifth generation
- Lifespan: 7 July 2000 – 23 March 2006
- Units sold: 28.15 million
- Controller input: DualShock

The PS One (officially stylized as PS one and alternatively spelled PSOne and PSone) is a smaller, redesigned version of the original PlayStation platform. (Dimensions are 38 mm × 193 mm × 144 mm versus 45 mm × 260 mm × 185 mm.) It was released on 7 July 2000, and went on to outsell all other consoles throughout the remainder of the year—including Sony's own PlayStation 2. The PS One is fully compatible with all PlayStation software; compatibility with certain peripherals may vary, however. The PS One also had additional changes, including the removal of the parallel and serial ports from the rear of the console, and the removal of a separate reset button (the power button is also labeled as a reset button, executed by double-pressing the switch in quick succession).

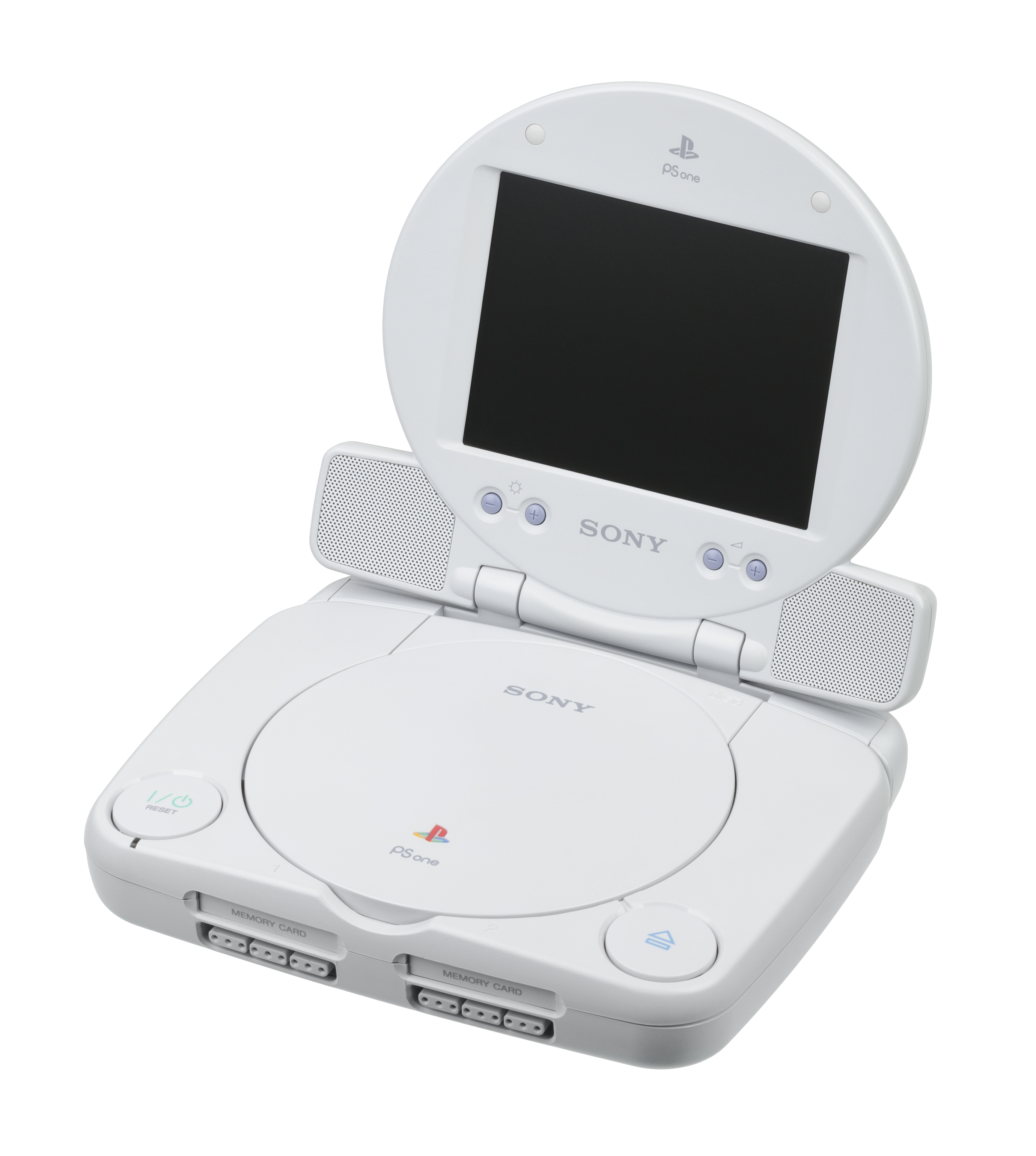
The PS One with LCD screen attachment

On 2 January 2002, Sony released a bundle set called the Combo that included a 5-inch (130 mm) LCD screen attachment (SCPH-131) which was initially offered as a separate attachment for the PS One on 19 September 2000. The screen itself included built-in stereo speakers, volume and brightness controls, passthrough ports for power and AV outputs and had a headphone jack as well as an AV mini jack for connecting camcorders or other devices.

== Comparison of models ==
Model:	BIOS:	Batch production dates:	Case:	Hardware:	Board model number:	A/V Direct Out:	Parallel Port:	Serial Port:	Notes:
SCPH-1000	1.0 (1994-09-22)	September 1994 - May 1997	Original (grey)	Rev. A/B	PU-7	Yes			FMV skipping issues. S-Video direct out. Dynamic lighting and color banding issues. Overheating and CD drive burnout issues.
SCPH-1001	2.2 (1995-12-04)	July 1995 - May 1997	Original (grey)	Rev. B/C	PU-8, PU-7 (early December 1995 and prior)	Yes			FMV skipping issues. S-Video direct out removed. Overheating and CD drive burnout issues. Units manufactured in late December 1995 onward use the PU-8 motherboard, which fixes issues with dynamic lighting and color banding that were present on earlier models with the PU-7 motherboard (early December 1995 unit batches and prior). SCPH-1001 and SCPH-1002 are based on the SCPH-3000 series. SCPH-5000 is based on the SCPH-3000 but offered at a reduced retail price. Two controllers are included with the SCPH-3500, itself based on the SCPH-3000.
SCPH-1002	2.0 (1995-05-10)	July 1995 - May 1997	Original (grey)	Rev. B/C	PU-8, PU-7 (early December 1995 and prior)	Yes			
SCPH-1002	2.1 (1995-07-17)	July 1995 - May 1997	Original (grey)	Rev. B/C	PU-8, PU-7 (early December 1995 and prior)	Yes			
SCPH-1002	2.2 (1995-12-04)	July 1995 - May 1997	Original (grey)	Rev. B/C	PU-8, PU-7 (early December 1995 and prior)	Yes			
SCPH-3000	1.1 (1995-01-22)	Unknown	Original (grey)	Rev. B	PU-8, PU-7 (early December 1995 and prior)	Yes			
SCPH-3500	2.1 (1995-07-17)	Unknown	Original (grey)	Rev. B	PU-8	Yes			
SCPH-5000	2.2 (1995-12-04)	Unknown	Original (grey)	Rev. C	PU-8	Yes			
SCPH-5003	2.2 (1995-12-04)	Unknown	Original (grey)	Rev. C	PU-8	Yes			
SCPH-5500	3.0 (1996-09-09)	May 1997 - April 1998	Original (grey)	Rev. C	PU-18	No	Yes		Minor FMV skipping issues. CD-ROM drive re-located on right side of CD bay to prevent overheating issues with the CD drive. Digital servo for focus/tracking introduced, manual gain/bias calibration removed. Lens carriage reinforced and power simplified, making FMV skipping issues less prominent. Only revision with bottom cover under the drive. A/V direct out and RFU power connector removed. Motherboard PCB reduced in size. Model numbers synchronized worldwide. Two controllers are included with the SCPH-5552, itself based on the SCPH-5502.
SCPH-5501	3.0 (1996-11-18)	May 1997 - April 1998	Original (grey)	Rev. C	PU-18	No	Yes		
SCPH-5502	3.0 (1997-01-06)	May 1997 - April 1998	Original (grey)	Rev. C	PU-18	No	Yes		
SCPH-5503	3.0 (1996-11-18)	May 1997 - April 1998	Original (grey)	Rev. C	PU-18	No	Yes		
SCPH-5552	3.0 (1997-01-06)	Unknown	Original (grey)	Rev. C	PU-18	No	Yes		
SCPH-5903	2.2 (1995-12-04)	Unknown	Original (white)	Rev. C	PU-16	Yes			Designed specifically for the Southeast Asian market, it is based on the SCPH-5003 model except that it is capable of playing Video CD movies and includes an additional security chip to curb piracy rampant in some Southeast Asian countries. It is therefore the only model to have Video CD playback. It is also finished in white color instead of the standard grey color used in all other consoles before the SCPH-100 redesign. Being based on the SCPH-5003, it retains the A/V direct out and RFU power connector ports found in previous models unlike the SCPH-5500 series and later.
SCPH-7000	4.0 (1997-08-18)	April 1998 - August 1998	Original (grey)	Rev. C	PU-20, PU-18 (April 1998)	No	Yes		Minor FMV skipping issues. Same internal and external build as the 550x series. DualShock now standard. Introduction of Sound Scope. Most models in the series used the PU-20 motherboard, which is a cost-reduced and rearranged version of the PU-18 motherboards (found on models made in April 1998).
SCPH-7001	4.1 (1997-12-16)	April 1998 - August 1998	Original (grey)	Rev. C	PU-20, PU-18 (April 1998)	No	Yes		Minor FMV skipping issues. Same internal and external build as the 550x series. DualShock now standard. Introduction of Sound Scope. Most models in the series used the PU-20 motherboard, which is a cost-reduced and rearranged version of the PU-18 motherboards (found on models made in April 1998).
SCPH-7002	4.1 (1997-12-16)	April 1998 - August 1998	Original (grey)	Rev. C	PU-20, PU-18 (April 1998)	No	Yes		Minor FMV skipping issues. Same internal and external build as the 550x series. DualShock now standard. Introduction of Sound Scope. Most models in the series used the PU-20 motherboard, which is a cost-reduced and rearranged version of the PU-18 motherboards (found on models made in April 1998).
SCPH-7003	3.0 (1996-11-18)	April 1998 - August 1998	Original (grey)	Rev. C	PU-20, PU-18 (April 1998)	No	Yes		Minor FMV skipping issues. Same internal and external build as the 550x series. DualShock now standard. Introduction of Sound Scope. Most models in the series used the PU-20 motherboard, which is a cost-reduced and rearranged version of the PU-18 motherboards (found on models made in April 1998).
SCPH-7000W	4.1 (1997-11-14)	April 1998	Original (midnight blue)	Rev. C	PU-18	No	Yes		Known as the "10 million model" to commemorate the 10 millionth PlayStation sold in late 1997, this Japanese-region model is finished in Midnight Blue and allows games from any region to be played. It has a unique BIOS based on the American version to account for it. It was offered exclusively as a promotional item that could be acquired via a contest that ran in December 1997 in Japan and from March 1998 to May 1998 in the USA/Canada. According to an anonymous SCEI employee, the SCPH-7000W is based on the Asian SCPH-7003 model and was ultimately not exported due to EMC certification requirements, with North America and Europe instead receiving standard retail models with midnight blue shells.
SCPH-7500	4.1 (1997-12-16)	August 1998 - May 1999	Original (grey)	Rev. C	PU-22, PU-18 (early August 1998)	No	Yes		Major manufacturing cost reductions took place from this model onwards. The CD drive now used a metal beam type instead of plastic, fixing FMV skipping issues and creating overall longer CD drive longevity. The number of memory chips and CD-ROM controllers were reduced, other components were simplified. Much sharper graphics and improved A/V video output than with previous models. Some early 750x units use the PU-18 motherboard (as found on models made in April 1998), the only batch of the 750x that doesn't benefit from sharper graphics. Most likely, this was a very early 700x batch being mislabeled as 750x units during the transition of models. Units made in April or May 1999 use the same case as with 900x units, with the parallel port being covered by the case. The parallel port was removed in later 900x units.
SCPH-7501	4.1 (1997-12-16)	August 1998 - May 1999	Original (grey)	Rev. C	PU-22, PU-18 (early August 1998)	No	Yes		
SCPH-7502	4.1 (1997-12-16)	August 1998 - May 1999	Original (grey)	Rev. C	PU-22, PU-18 (early August 1998)	No	Yes		
SCPH-7503	4.1 (1997-12-16)	August 1998 - May 1999	Original (grey)	Rev. C	PU-22, PU-18 (early August 1998)	No	Yes		
SCPH-9000	4.0 (1997-08-18)	May 1999 - September 2000	Original (grey)	Rev. C	PU-23, PU-22 (May 1999)	No		Yes	Parallel port removed. Motherboard PCB reduced in size. Some earlier 900x units use the PU-22 motherboard (as found on models made on or before May 1999), which had the parallel port on it but was made hidden on the case of the 900x unit. Most likely, this was a very late 750x batch having their parallel ports hidden, being mislabeled as 900x units during the transition of models.
SCPH-9001	4.1 (1997-12-16)	May 1999 - September 2000	Original (grey)	Rev. C	PU-23, PU-22 (May 1999)	No		Yes	Parallel port removed. Motherboard PCB reduced in size. Some earlier 900x units use the PU-22 motherboard (as found on models made on or before May 1999), which had the parallel port on it but was made hidden on the case of the 900x unit. Most likely, this was a very late 750x batch having their parallel ports hidden, being mislabeled as 900x units during the transition of models.
SCPH-9002	4.1 (1997-12-16)	May 1999 - September 2000	Original (grey)	Rev. C	PU-23, PU-22 (May 1999)	No		Yes	Parallel port removed. Motherboard PCB reduced in size. Some earlier 900x units use the PU-22 motherboard (as found on models made on or before May 1999), which had the parallel port on it but was made hidden on the case of the 900x unit. Most likely, this was a very late 750x batch having their parallel ports hidden, being mislabeled as 900x units during the transition of models.
SCPH-9003	4.1 (1997-12-16)	May 1999 - September 2000	Original (grey)	Rev. C	PU-23, PU-22 (May 1999)	No		Yes	Parallel port removed. Motherboard PCB reduced in size. Some earlier 900x units use the PU-22 motherboard (as found on models made on or before May 1999), which had the parallel port on it but was made hidden on the case of the 900x unit. Most likely, this was a very late 750x batch having their parallel ports hidden, being mislabeled as 900x units during the transition of models.
SCPH-100	4.3 (2000-03-11)	August 2000	PS one (white)	Rev. C	PM-41, PM-41 (2)	No			Redesigned smaller case. Controller and memory card ports integrated onto motherboard. Serial port removed. Has external power supply.
SCPH-101	4.5 (2000-05-25)	August 2000	PS one (white)	Rev. C	PM-41, PM-41 (2)	No			Redesigned smaller case. Controller and memory card ports integrated onto motherboard. Serial port removed. Has external power supply.
SCPH-102	4.4 (2000-03-24)	August 2000	PS one (white)	Rev. C	PM-41, PM-41 (2)	No			Redesigned smaller case. Controller and memory card ports integrated onto motherboard. Serial port removed. Has external power supply.
SCPH-102	4.5 (2000-05-25)	August 2000	PS one (white)	Rev. C	PM-41, PM-41 (2)	No			Redesigned smaller case. Controller and memory card ports integrated onto motherboard. Serial port removed. Has external power supply.
SCPH-103	4.5 (2000-05-25)	August 2000	PS one (white)	Rev. C	PM-41, PM-41 (2)	No			Redesigned smaller case. Controller and memory card ports integrated onto motherboard. Serial port removed. Has external power supply.

=== Region codes ===
The last digit of the PlayStation model number denotes the region in which it was sold:

- 0 is Japan (Japanese boot ROM, NTSC-J region, NTSC video, 100 V PSU)
- 1 is USA/Canada (English boot ROM, NTSC-U/C region, NTSC video, 120 V PSU)
- 2 is PAL regions (English boot ROM, PAL region, PAL video, 220-240 V PSU). Sub-models exist differing in bundled accessories:
  - 2A is Australia. Australian mains cord and composite (RCA) cable.
  - 2B is United Kingdom and Ireland. BS 1363 domestic mains cord and RF modulator instead of composite cable.
  - 2C is for other PAL countries such as the rest of Europe. Europlug mains cord and composite cable plus RCA to SCART adapter.
- 3 is Asia (English boot ROM, NTSC-J region, NTSC video, Wide range 110-240 V PSU)

=== Quality of construction ===
Some units, particularly the early 100x models, would be unable to play FMV or music correctly, resulting in skipping or freezing. In more extreme cases the PlayStation would only work correctly when turned onto its side or upside down.

The first batch of PlayStations used a KSM-440AAM laser unit whose case and all movable parts were completely made out of plastic. Over time, friction caused the plastic tray to wear out—usually unevenly. The placement of the laser unit close to the power supply accelerated wear because of the additional heat, which made the plastic even more vulnerable to friction. Eventually, the tray would become so worn that the laser no longer pointed directly at the CD and games would no longer load. Sony addressed this issue by making the tray out of die-cast metal and additionally placed the laser unit farther away from the power supply on later models of the PlayStation, which also indirectly fixed FMV skipping and freezing issues completely.

== See also ==
- PlayStation 2 models
- PlayStation 3 models
- PlayStation 4
- PlayStation 5 models
