= Crazy Bus =

2004 video game

- Title screen
- Developer: Tom Scripts
- Composer: Live-generated audio
- Engine: BasiEgaXorz
- Platform: Sega Genesis
- Release: 2004
- Genre: Vehicle simulation
- Mode: Single-player

Crazy Bus (styled on the title screen as CRAZYBUS) is a 2004 unlicensed vehicle simulation game where the player drives a bus. Originally created as a tech demo, it was subsequently put on a ROM cartridge and published by an unauthorized 3rd party for the Sega Genesis. The game was developed by Venezuelan Tom Maneiro under the alias "Tom Scripts".

== History ==
Crazy Bus was initially uploaded online as a software test program made for the Genesis. It was developed by Venezuelan Tom Scripts (real name Tom Maneiro). After attracting the attention of video game enthusiasts in the United States and elsewhere, a ROM cartridge was created by a third party, complete with cover art and a user manual. Neither the game's creator nor Sega were involved in the release of the cartridge.

== Gameplay ==
The gameplay both in Version 2.0 and 1.0 simply consists of driving a 2D bus back and forth. Driving the bus forward accumulates points, with a highest possible score of 65,535 points (the maximum value that can be stored in an unsigned 16-bit integer). Driving the bus backwards subtracts points; however, points can roll over to the maximum score of 65,535. The game also allows the player to honk the horn of the bus. Players can choose between the following buses:

- Irizar Century 390 (Spanish)
- Busscar Jum Buss 360 (Brazilian)
- Encava 6000 (Venezuelan)
- A Generic School Bus
- Marcopolo Paradiso GV1150 (Brazilian)

The game's "soundtrack" music is composed of random tones, generated with a pseudorandom algorithm.

== Reception and legacy ==
Crazy Bus has gained notoriety for its bizarre, scrambled music. The soundtrack has been described by Screen Rant as "one of the most over-the-top and intolerably shrill soundtracks of all time" and by CBR as "chaotic". The soundtrack was featured on the 2022 "Level Up: Gaming Soundtracks" episode of BBC Radio 3's Late Junction music programme.

In 2014, the game was reviewed in episode 124 of the popular web series Angry Video Game Nerd, where all aspects of the game were criticized for poor quality. According to a 2021 report published by the University of Carabobo, while Crazy Bus did not achieve commercial success as a pirated game, the subsequent popularity of Crazy Bus drew attention to other games published in Venezuela.

The game has been played by YouTubers and Twitch streamers who treat it as a strange novelty.

== See also ==
- List of video games considered the worst
