= Firefighter F.D.18 =

2004 video game

- Developer: Konami Computer Entertainment
- Publisher: Konami
- Composer: Norikazu Miura
- Platform: PlayStation 2
- Release: JP: February 26, 2004; NA: March 9, 2004; EU: April 23, 2004
- Genre: Third-person action
- Mode: Single player

Firefighter F.D.18 is an action game created and developed by Konami Computer Entertainment Tokyo and published by Konami. The game was released on March 9, 2004 in North America for the PlayStation 2.

== Story ==
The game revolves around Dean McGregor, a highly skilled firefighter as he gets involved in a series of blazes that may have been committed by an arsonist with assistance from a news reporter.

== Gameplay ==
In this game, players become firefighters. Their goal is to clear areas where fire has broken out and rescue civilians and fight fire "bosses" at the end. Players have an axe, a fire hose, and a fire extinguisher to break down doors and put out fires as they rescue survivors. Stages are timed. Obstacles, such as falling beams, and chemicals, hinder progress and must be cleared before the player can progress further.

== Reception ==
Reception

Aggregate score
Aggregator	Score
Metacritic	63/100

Review scores
Publication	Score
Computer Games Magazine	B−
Electronic Gaming Monthly	5.5/10 (Note: Three critics of Electronic Gaming Monthly gave the game each a score of 6.5/10, 6/10, and 4/10.)
Eurogamer	5/10
Famitsu	31/40
Game Informer	5/10
GameRevolution	D
GameSpot	7.1/10
GameZone	8.5/10
IGN	6.8/10
Official U.S. PlayStation Magazine	2.5/5
X-Play	2/5

The game received "mixed" reviews according to the review aggregation website Metacritic. In Japan, however, Famitsu gave it a score of three eights and one seven for a total of 31 out of 40. Pong Sifu of GamePro said, "Despite a contrived love story, limited camera control, and levels that tend to drag, Konami has provided a refreshing change of pace in this punishing man-versus-nature offering that it requires you to stem the tide of destruction and actually save lives for once." (Note: GamePro gave the game three 4/5 scores for graphics, sound, and fun factor, and 3/5 for control.)
