= PlayStation 2 models =

Overview of models for Sony's PlayStation 2

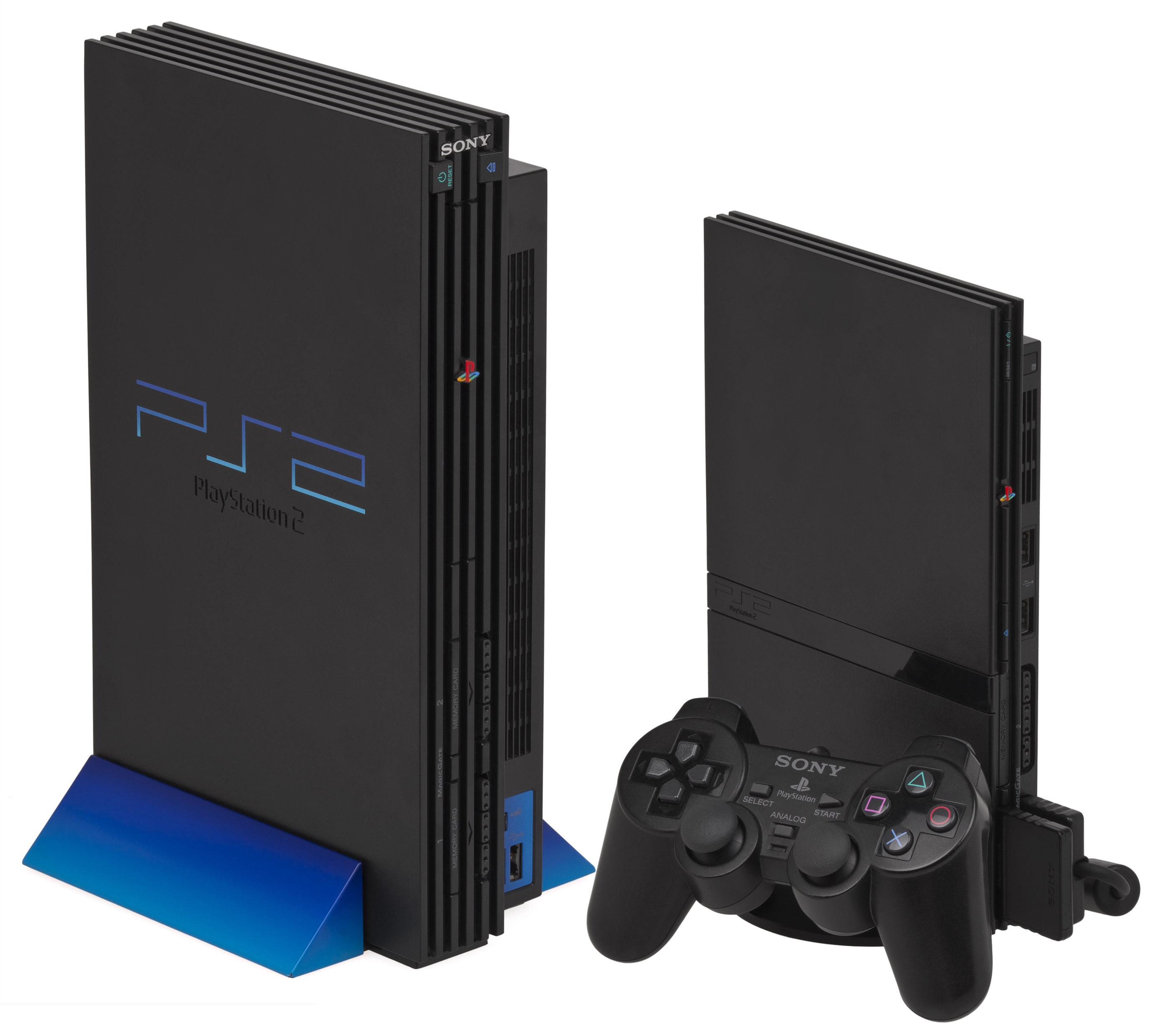
The original and revised models of the PlayStation 2. Left: Original PlayStation 2 (2000) Right: Slim PlayStation 2 (2004)

Several models of the PlayStation 2 (PS2) video game console were produced from 2000 to 2013. Some PS2 revisions only change in their internal construction or implement cost-saving measures while others feature substantial external changes.

Each region receives a different model number; for example, slimline models produced from 2008 to 2013 were released in North America as SCPH-90001, in Australia as SCPH-90002, and in Hong Kong as SCPH-90006. The final digit is a region code with no bearing on the hardware; many games and DVDs are restricted to certain regions, and the system software displays in different languages.

A total of 5 different models of the PS2 were produced during its lifespan. The PS2 is primarily differentiated between models with the original "fat" case design introduced in mid-to-late 2000 and the later "slimline" models introduced at the end of 2004. In 2010, a television incorporating a PS2 was introduced.

== Original case design ==
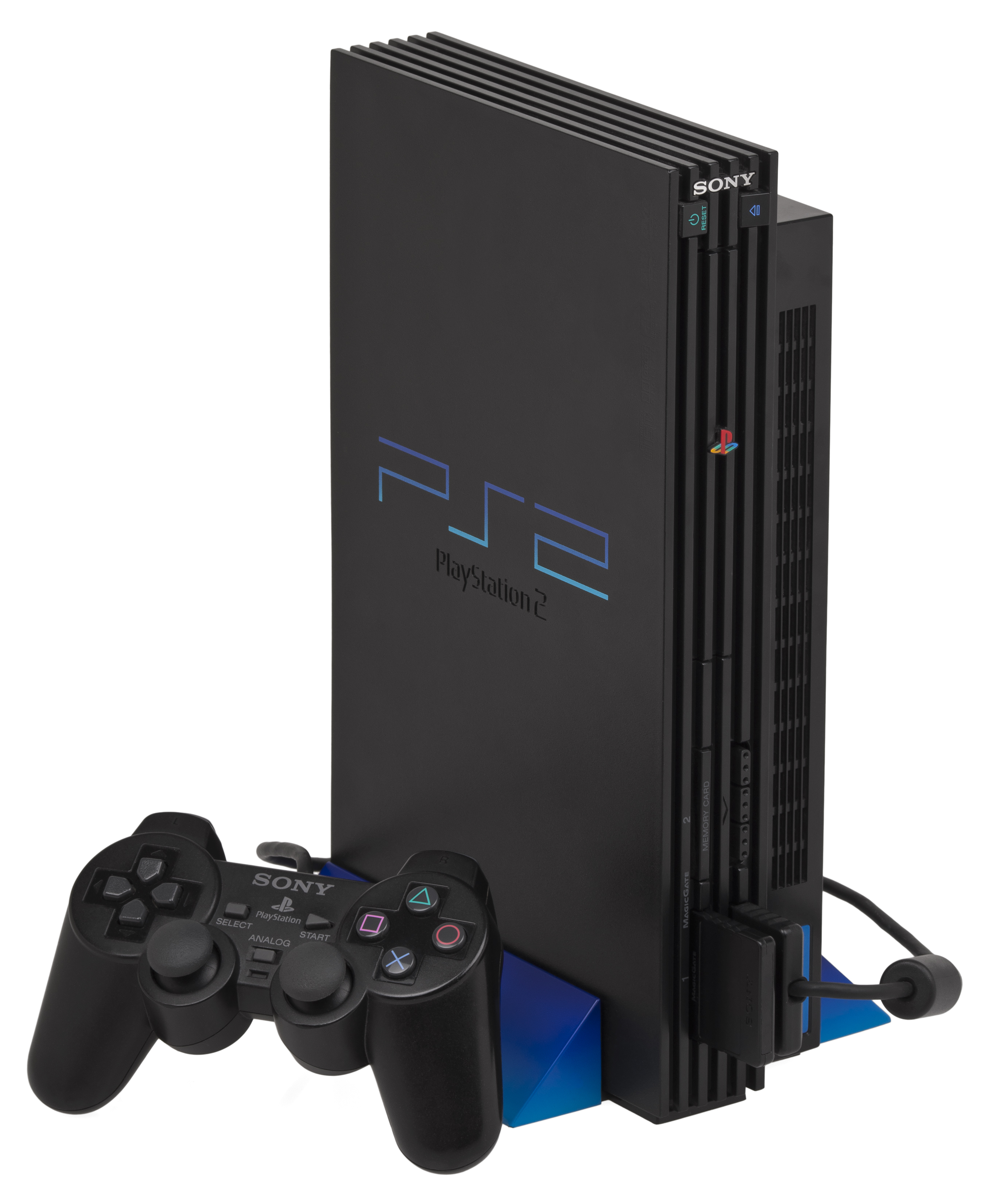
Original (fat) model PS2 with DualShock 2

Three of the original PS2 models (SCPH-10000, SCPH-15000 and SCPH-18000) were only sold in Japan and had a PCMCIA slot unlike all other models sold worldwide. The two PS2 launch models in Japan (SCPH-10000 and SCPH-15000) had no built-in DVD movie playback and instead relied on encrypted playback software that was copied to a memory card from an included CD-ROM (normally, the PS2 will only execute encrypted software from its memory card; see PS2 Independence Exploit); the later Japan-only PS2 models (SCPH-18000 and later) did eventually come with built-in DVD movie playback.

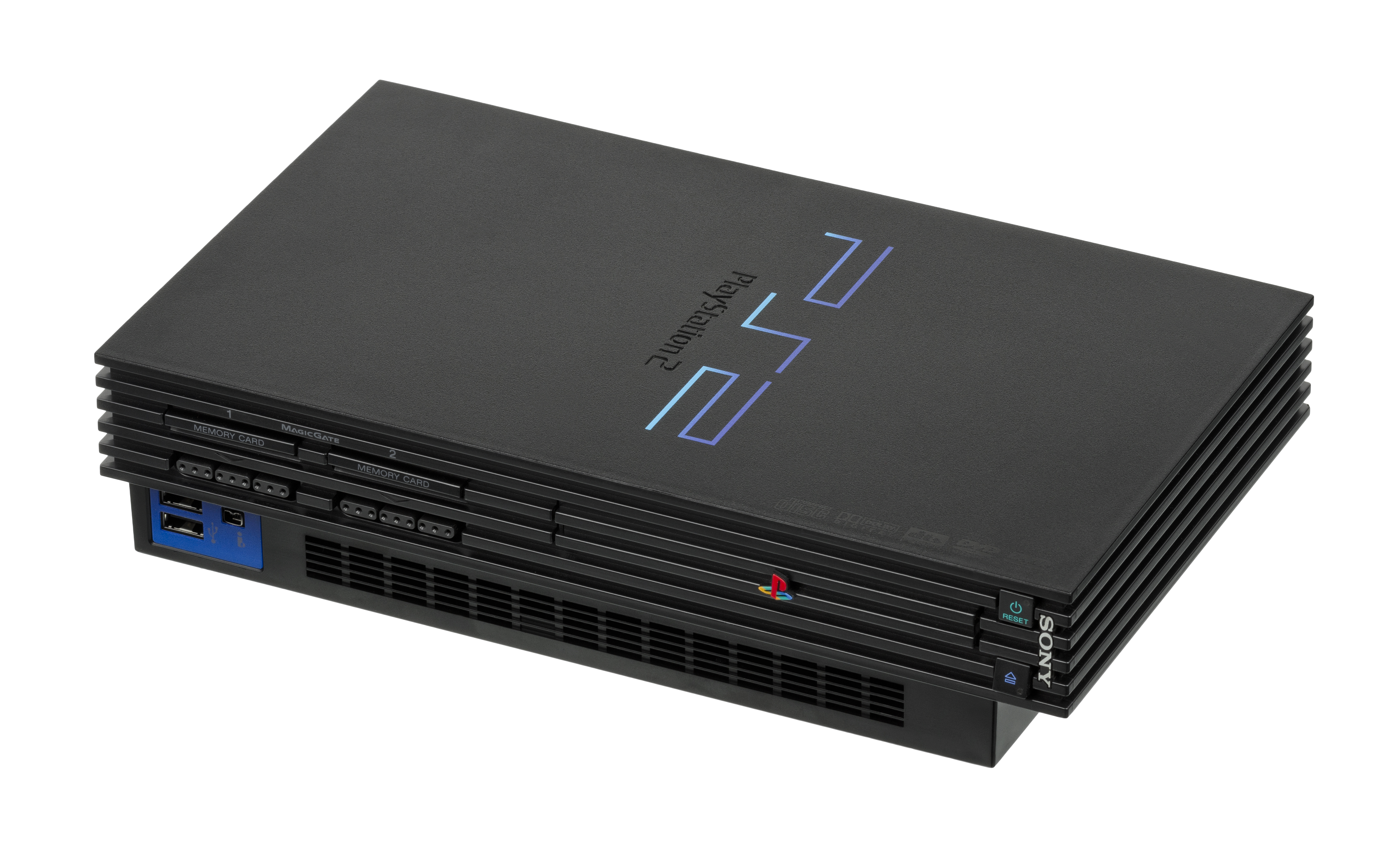
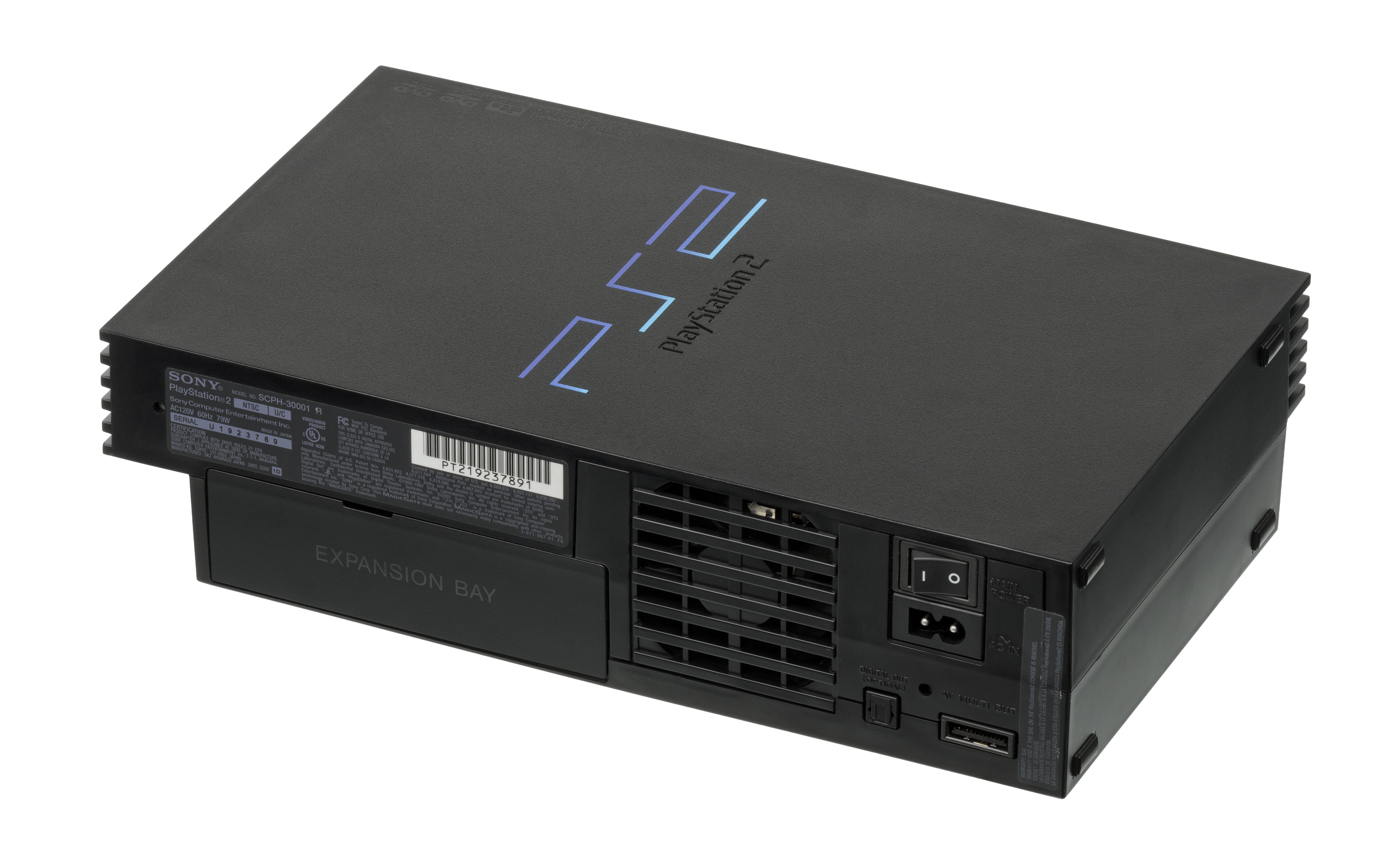
SCPH-3000x model (front and rear)

There was also the SCPH-3000x, 3500x, 37000, 3900x, and 500xx models, which were sold between 2000 and 2004 for all regions including North America and Europe. These models replaced the PCMCIA slot of previous Japan-only models with the expansion bay, which contained space for a 3.5" hard disk drive and a connector for the Network Adaptor. They also came with built-in DVD movie playback, unlike the initial two PS2 models in Japan.

Early SCPH-3000x models produced from late 2000 to early 2001 had a substantially different internal structure than with earlier Japan-only revisions as well as subsequent revisions, featuring several interconnected printed circuit boards. In later SCPH-3000x models produced from 2001 to 2002 as well as the SCPH-3500x, everything except the power supply was unified onto one board. Some minor internal changes were made in SCPH-3000x(R) (Note: The "R" designation was only used on models outside of Japan to indicate remote control support for the console's built-in DVD player. The Japan-only SCPH-30000 models do not use this designation.) models produced from late 2001 to 2002, and the only difference between early and later SCPH-3000x(R) models is the orientation of the Power/Reset switch board connector, which was reversed in later revisions to prevent the use of no-solder modchips. These models also had a more reliable laser than with previous models. SCPH-3000x models sold between 2000 and 2002 also used either the initial version of the Graphics Synthesizer (GS) as found on the three Japan-only models or the revised, smaller version of the Graphics Synthesizer as found in the majority of PS2 consoles up until the SCPH-500xx models and some SCPH-700xx and SCPH-7500x models, depending on the time of manufacture. SCPH-37000 and SCPH-3900x included only minor revisions to the 2001–2002 SCPH-3000x(R) models.

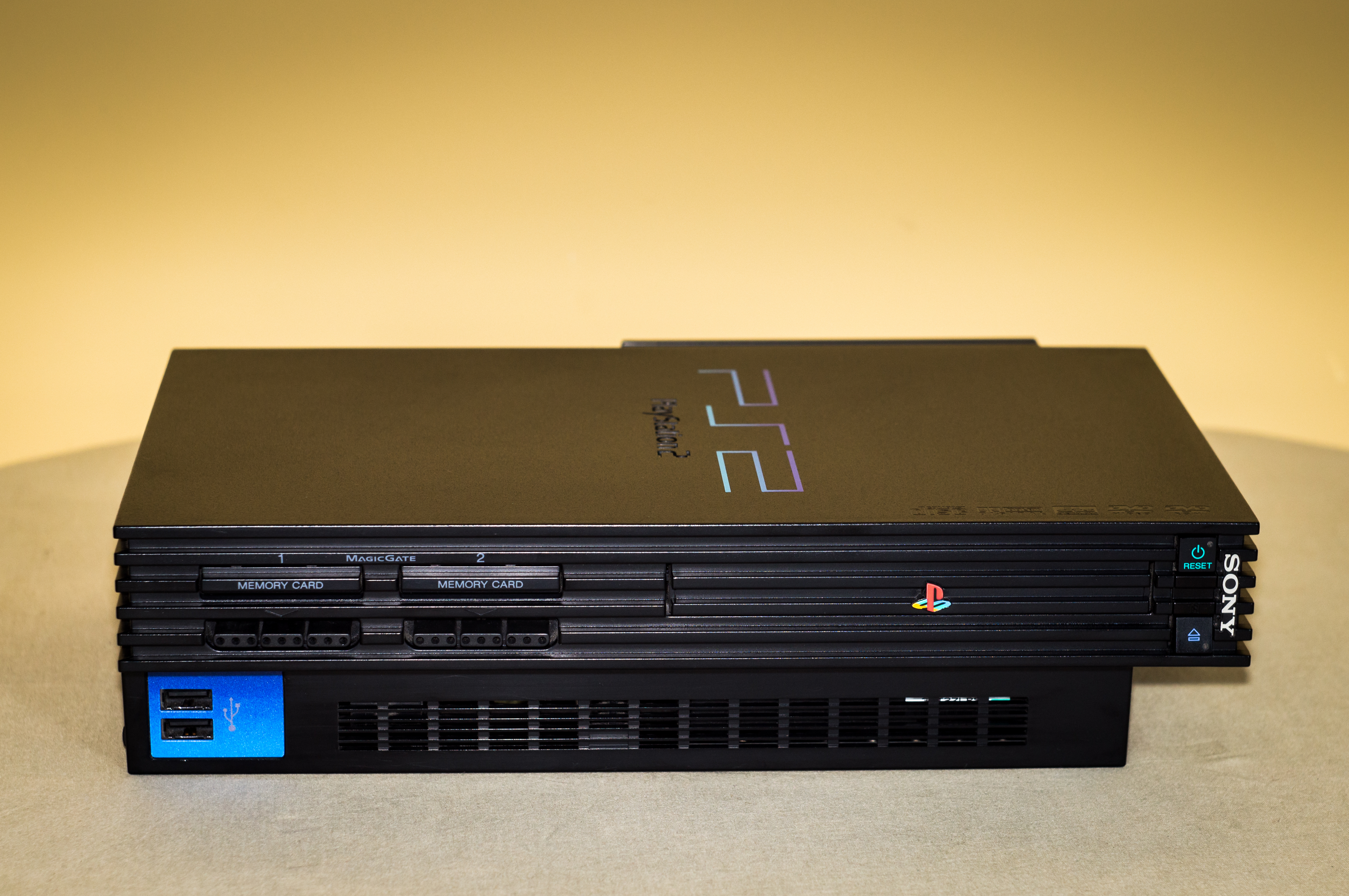
SCPH-500xx model

Beginning with the SCPH-500xx models, the i.LINK port was removed, and a built-in infrared receiver was added in-between the Power/Reset and Eject buttons to allow for the use of a remote to control DVD playback without the need of a dedicated infrared receiver dongle as used on previous models, leaving both controller ports free from the external receiver. The console's mechanics controller (also known as the MechaCon) was also upgraded to use an ARM-based core (based on the ARM7TDMI) instead of a Sony-provided one that was used in earlier models.

The standard color of the PS2 is matte black. Several different variations in color were produced in different quantities and regions, including ceramic white, light yellow, metallic blue (aqua), metallic silver, navy (star blue), opaque blue (astral blue), opaque black (midnight black), pearl white, Sakura purple, satin gold, satin silver, snow white, super red, transparent blue (ocean blue), and also Limited Edition color Pink, which was distributed in regions including Oceania and parts of Asia.

== Slimline case designs ==
PlayStation 2 slimline
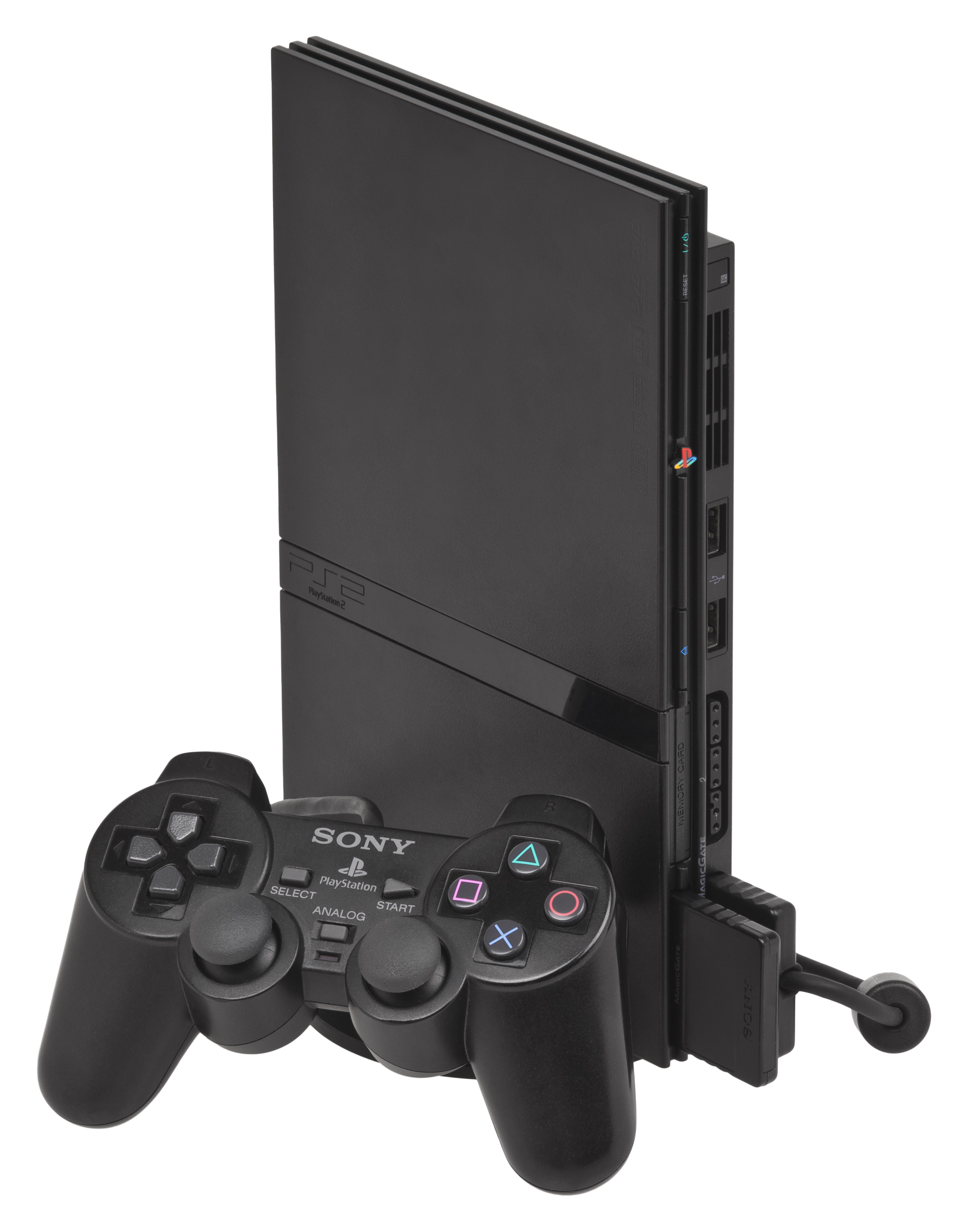
- Original style Slimline PS2 with a DualShock 2 controller
- Developer: Sony Computer Entertainment
- Manufacturer: Sony Electronics
- Product family: PlayStation
- Type: Home video game console
- Generation: Sixth generation
- Lifespan: October 29, 2004 – January 4, 2013
- CPU: 300 MHz
- Controller input: DualShock 2
- Connectivity: 2 × USB 1.1, Ethernet, IrDA, 2 × controller ports.

In September 2004, Sony unveiled its third major hardware revision of the PS2 (model number SCPH-700xx), also known as the slimline model. Available in late October 2004, it is smaller, thinner, and quieter than the original (fat) models and includes a built-in Ethernet port (in some markets it also has an integrated modem). The hardware was also given some minor changes, such as the Emotion Engine (EE) being clocked at a slightly higher CPU speed. Due to its thinner profile, the 3.5" expansion bay was completely removed and therefore does not support an internal hard disk drive. This results in incompatibility with games that require the HDD expansion, most notably Final Fantasy XI. An add-on to add HDD support to SCPH-7500x up to SCPH-9000x models called the HDPro was created but had limited success. It also has an external power supply as opposed to an internal one used in previous revisions, similar to the GameCube. A differently-shaped Multitap accessory was also released at the same time as the new revision due to design differences between the old and new PS2 models.

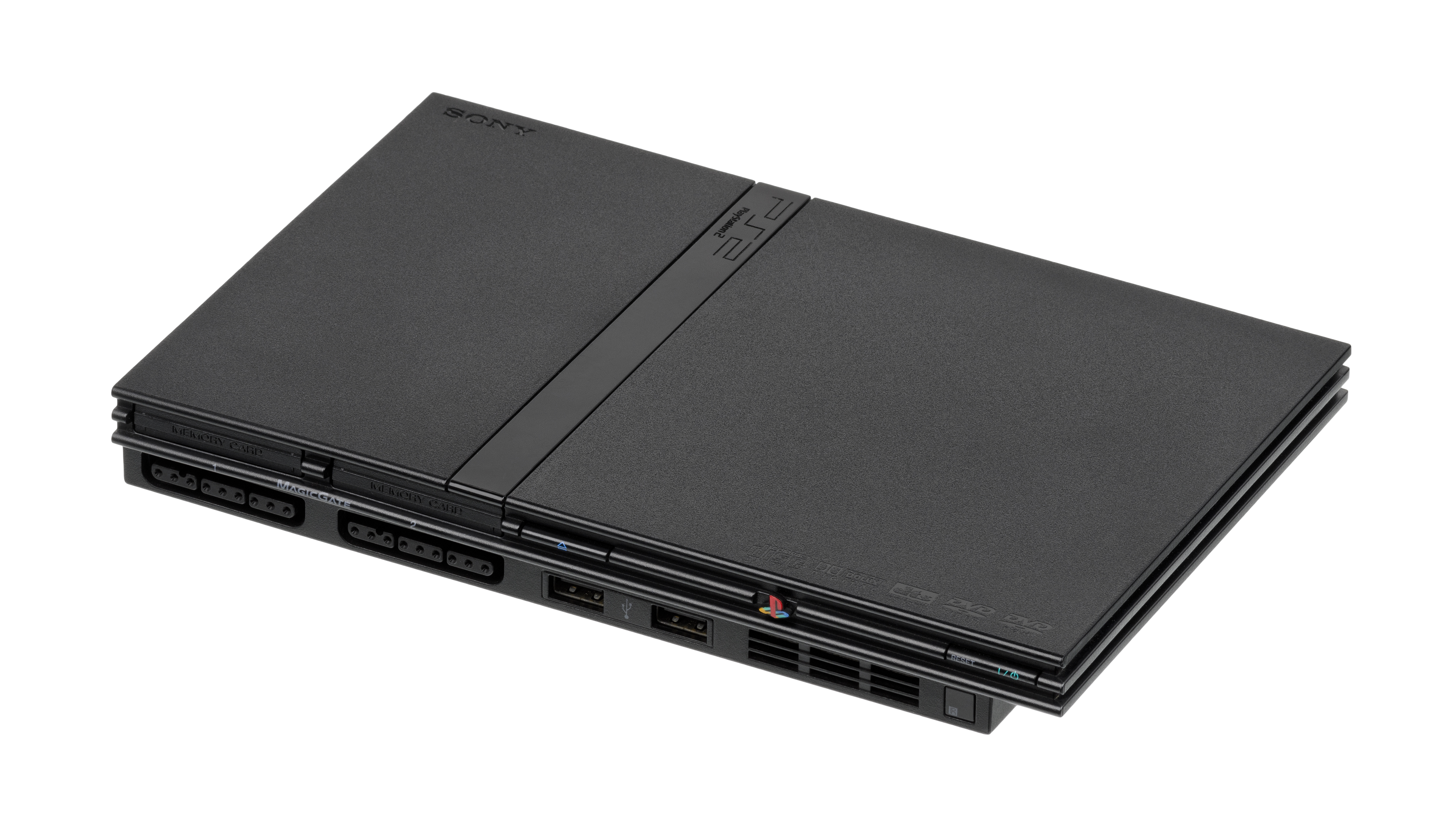
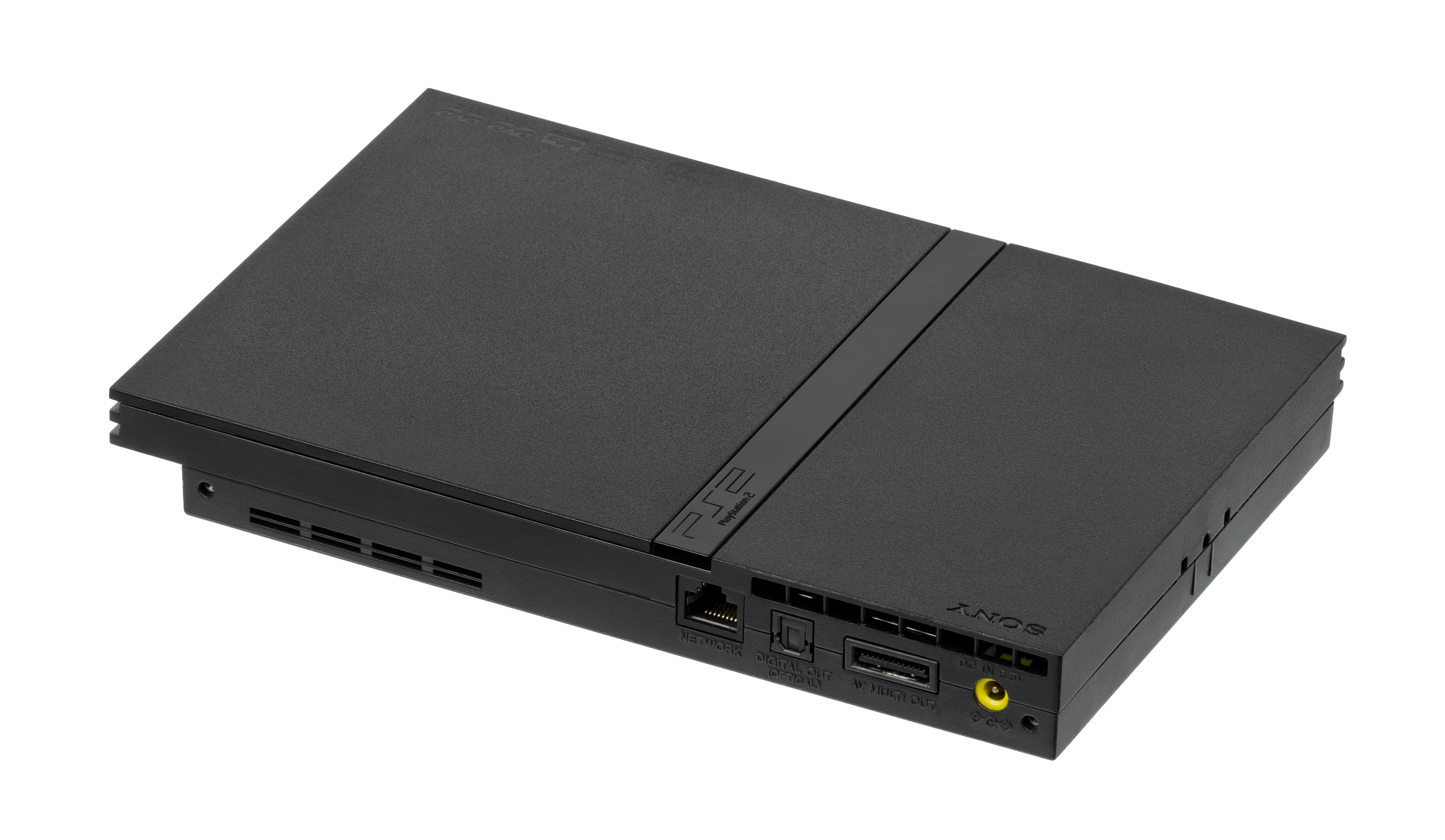
SCPH-700xx model (front and rear)

There were two sub-versions of the SCPH-700xx, one with the old separate Emotion Engine (EE) and Graphics Synthesizer (GS) chips and the other with the newer, integrated and unified EE+GS chip, but are otherwise identical. In early 2005, it was found that some slimline power transformers manufactured between August and December 2004 were defective and could overheat. These units were recalled by Sony and were subsequently replaced with a 2005 model unit.

The SCPH-700xx was succeeded by the SCPH-7500x in late 2005, which contained different ASICs than previous revisions. Like the SCPH-700xx, it also contained two sub-versions that had either separate EE and GS chips or the unified EE+GS chip. Some chips contained a copyright date of 2005 as opposed to 2000 or 2001 for earlier models. It also uses a different laser lens and a different IOP core based on the PowerPC architecture with 4 MB of RAM instead of a MIPS-based core of the PS1 with 2 MB of RAM, leading to some compatibility issues with a number of PS1 games and some PS2 games. Later hardware revisions had better compatibility with PS1 games (Metal Gear Solid: VR Missions operates on most silver models), however the later Japanese slim models had more issues with playing PS1 games than the first PS2 revisions.

On September 15, 2006, Sony released new hardware revisions of the PS2 (model number SCPH-7700x, with sub-versions as SCPH-7700x_{a} and SCPH-7700x_{b}). Initially released in Japan in both Black and Silver editions, it later saw release in North America, Europe and other parts of the world. This new revision exclusively uses the integrated, unified EE+GS chip as found in some SCPH-700xx and SCPH-7500x models, and has a redesigned ASIC, a different laser lens, and an updated BIOS and drivers.

On July 19, 2007, Sony started shipping another revision of the PS2 (SCPH-7900x) featuring a reduced weight of 600 grams compared to 900 g of the SCPH-7700x, achieved through a reduction in parts. This revision uses a smaller motherboard where the EE, RDRAM, SPU2 sound processor and IOP I/O processor were merged into a single ASIC while the GS was once again made as a separate chip, albeit in a much smaller form factor than previous PS2 revisions. The AC adaptor's weight was also reduced from 350 grams (12 oz) to 250 grams (8.8 oz).

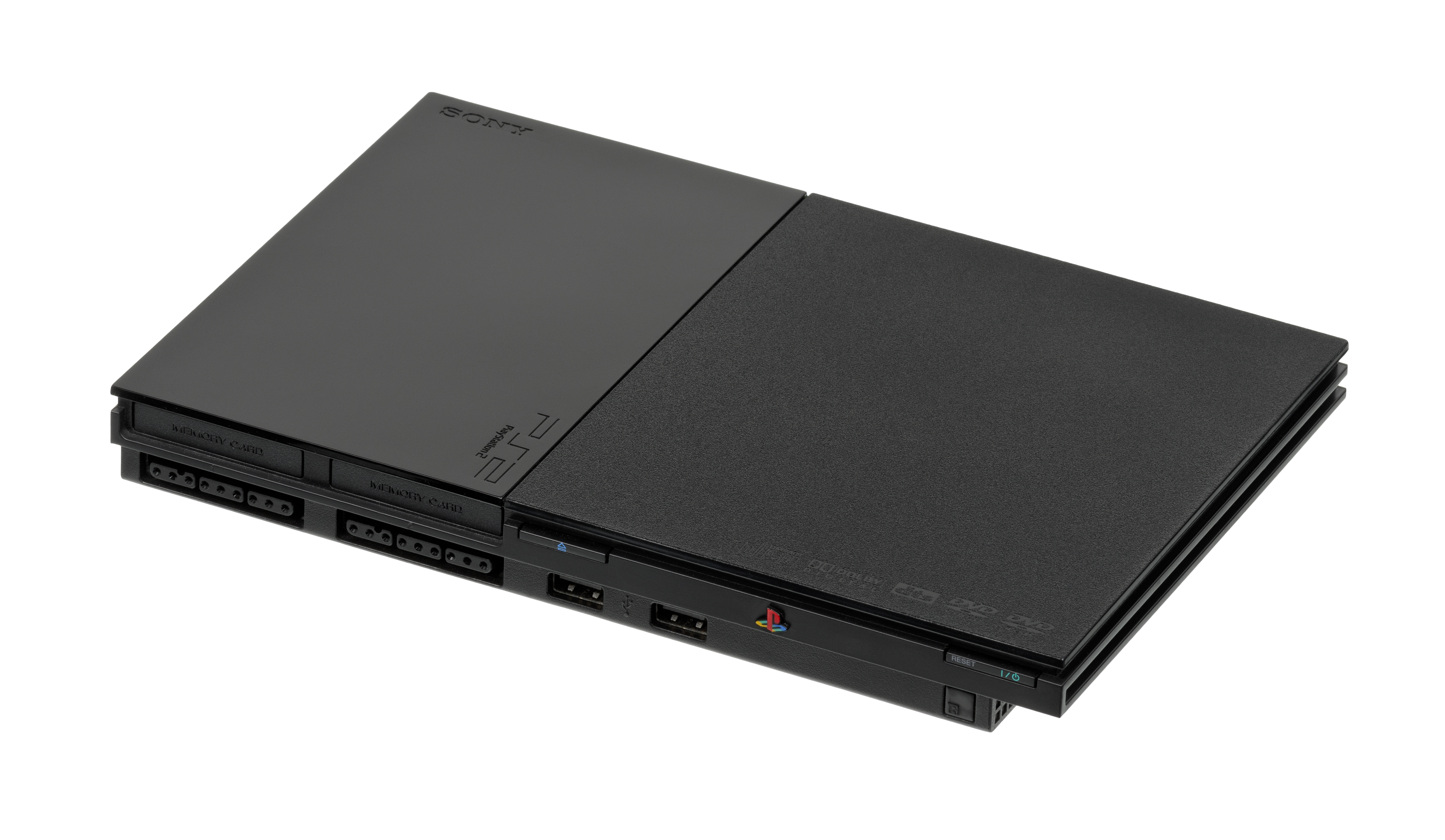
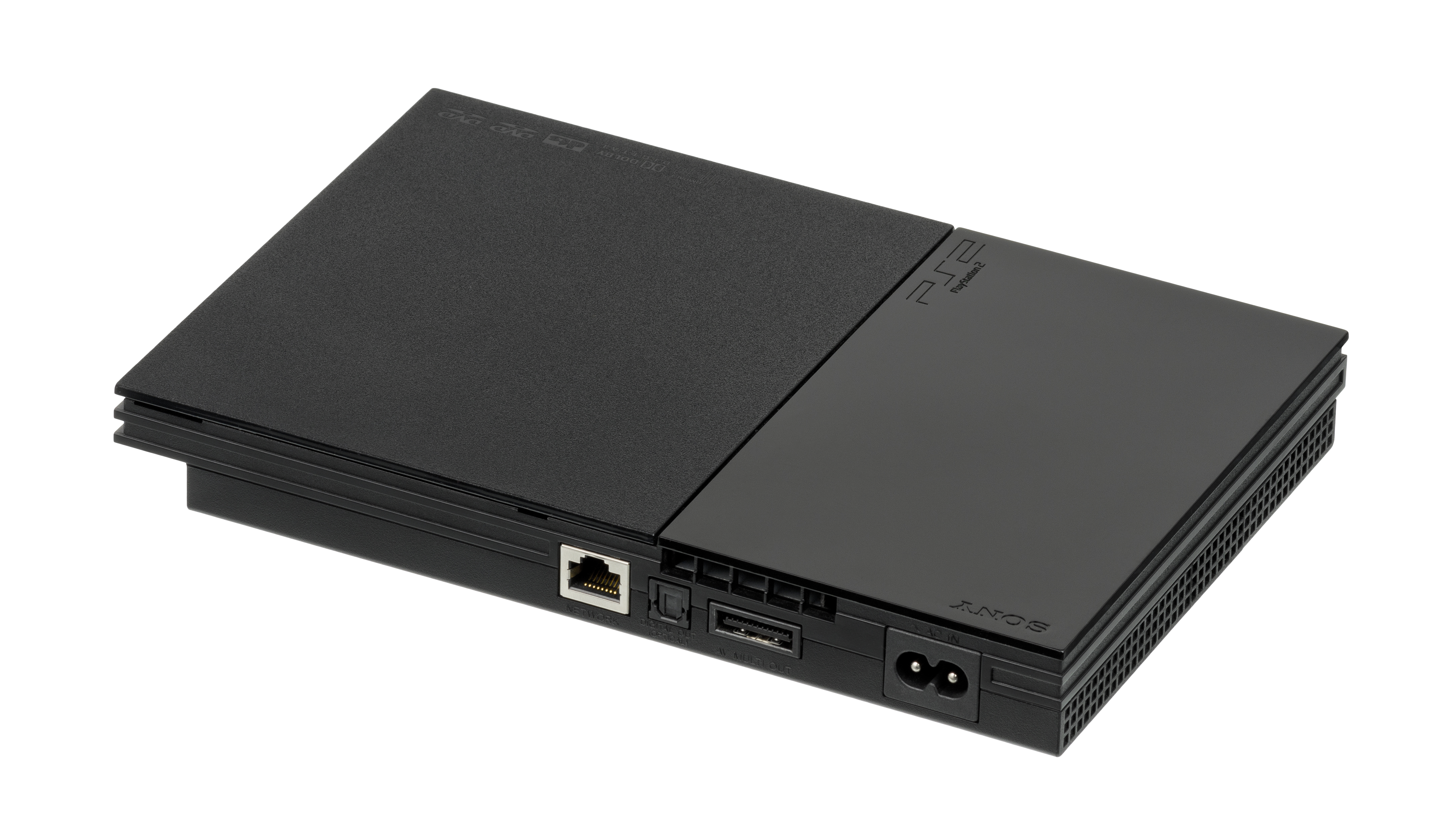
SCPH-9000x model (front and rear)

Another refinement of the PS2 (SCPH-9000x) was released in Japan on November 22, 2007. As well as featuring some cosmetic changes, the design of the hardware was overhauled, incorporating the power supply into the console itself like the original (fat) PS2 models; this increased the overall weight of the console to 720 grams (25 oz). On SCPH-9000x series consoles manufactured after the third quarter of 2008 as the last revision of the PS2 (indicated by date code 8C), some changes were made to incorporate a revised BIOS that patches an exploit found in all other models that allowed homebrew applications and software to be launched from a memory card. The SCPH-9000x series was never officially launched in the United Kingdom, although it was made available in select continental European markets.

The slimline model of the PS2 was initially released in black; however, a silver edition was made available in Japan, United Kingdom, Germany, Australia, United Arab Emirates and other GCC countries, France, Italy, South Africa, and North America. A limited edition pink console was also made available after March 2007.

== PSX ==
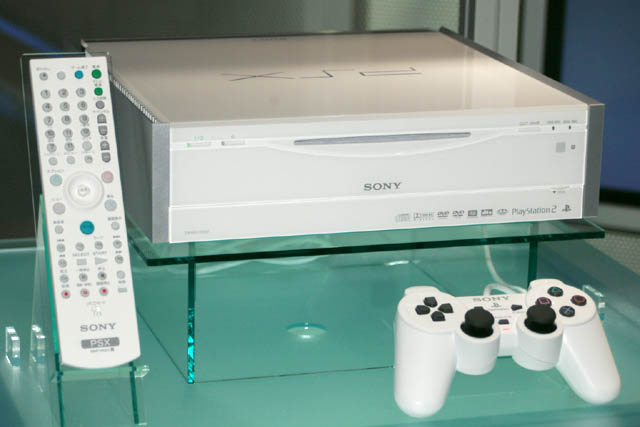
PSX digital video recorder

Sony also manufactured a consumer device called the PSX that can be used as a digital video recorder and DVD burner in addition to playing PS2 games. The device was released in Japan on December 13, 2003, and was the first Sony product to include the XrossMediaBar interface. It featured one USB port, a Memory Stick card reader, and two PlayStation 2 Memory Card slots, with the two controller ports moved to the back of the unit. It did not sell well in Japan and was not released anywhere else, making it a commercial failure.

== Audiovox VOD10PS2 ==
Released in the United States in 2009, the Audiovox VOD10PS2 is an officially-licensed aftermarket overhead DVD player for automobiles manufactured by Audiovox (now Voxx International) that includes a built-in PlayStation 2. It consists of an SCPH-9000x model PlayStation 2 integrated into the unit with a 10.2-inch (25.9 cm) display capable of displaying resolutions of up to 800x480. It also featured auxiliary A/V inputs into the unit along with a built-in 16-channel FM modulator with transmitter functions. It came with two third-party wireless DualShock 2 controllers in silver color, two foldable wireless headphones, a remote control, and two games, Hot Shots Golf 3 and Ratchet & Clank: Going Commando.

== Sony BRAVIA KDL22PX300 ==
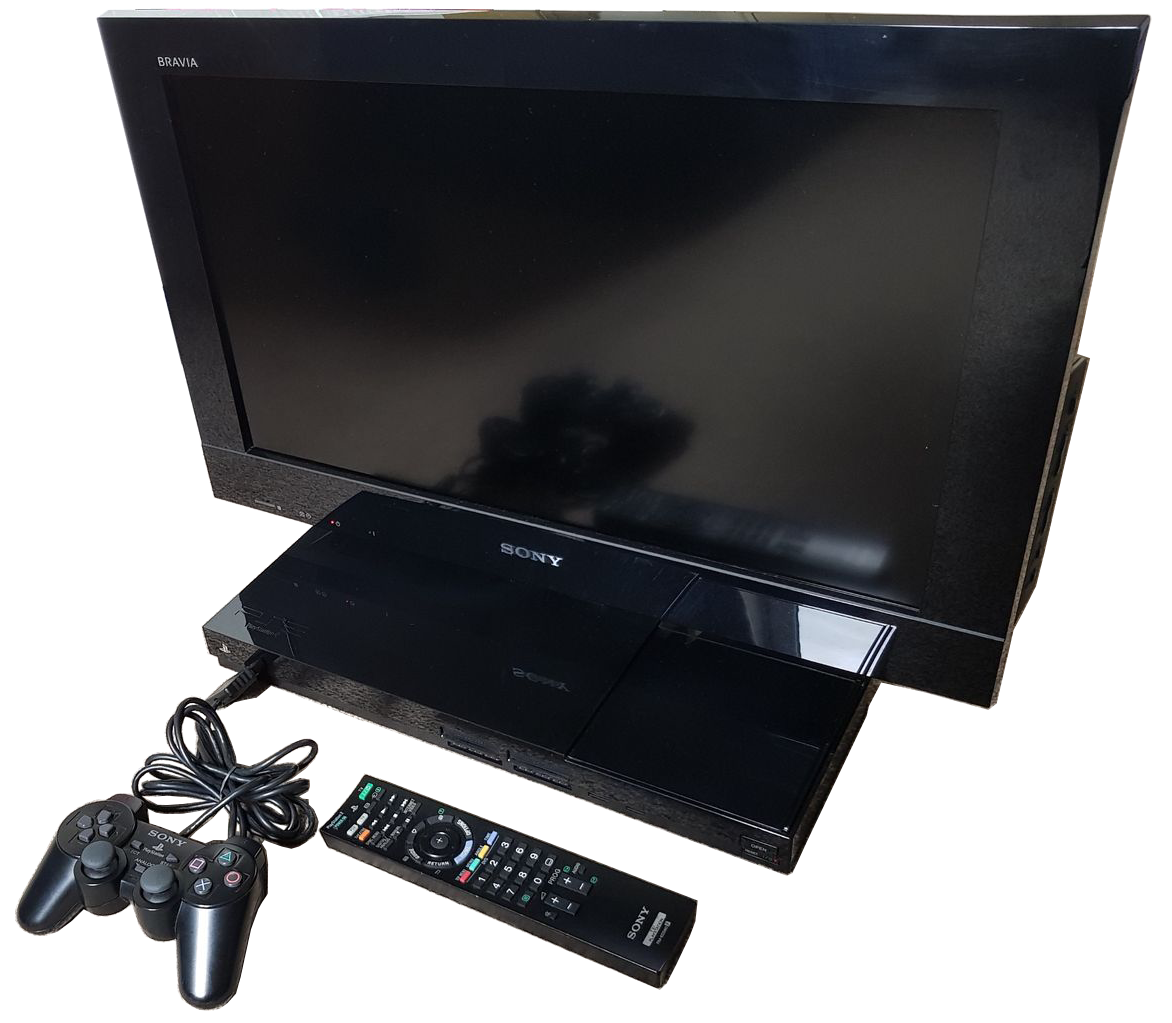
Sony BRAVIA KDL22PX300

Released in Europe in 2010, the Sony BRAVIA KDL22PX300 is a 22-inch (56 cm) 720p television that incorporates a PlayStation 2 console. It has a sliding disc cover and includes four HDMI ports. It also includes BRAVIA Internet Video Access, allowing users to access streaming services such as YouTube and on-demand television. Although the maximum resolution of the screen is 720p, 1080p input sources can be used and displayed.

== See also ==
- PlayStation models
- PlayStation 3 models
- PlayStation 4
- PlayStation 5
